= Valentine–French House =

Historic house in Massachusetts, United States

- U.S. National Register of Historic Places
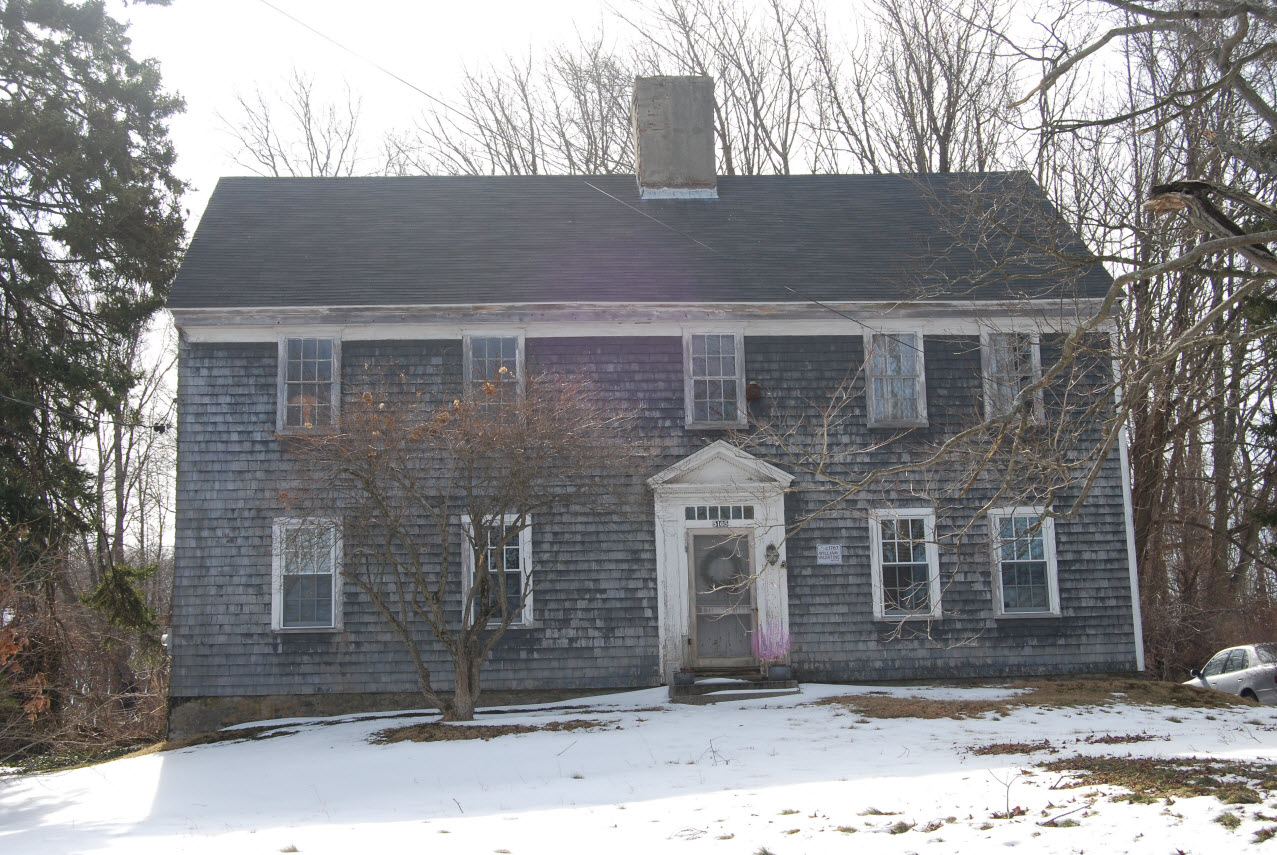

- Location within Massachusetts
- Location: 5105 N. Main St., Fall River, Massachusetts
- Coordinates: 41°45′4″N 71°6′40″W
- Built: 1769
- Architectural style: Georgian
- MPS: Fall River MRA
- NRHP reference No.: 83000727
- Added to NRHP: February 16, 1983

The Valentine–French House is a historic house located at 5105 North Main Street in Fall River, Massachusetts.

== Description and history ==
It built in 1769 on the 13th lot of Freemen's Purchase by William Valentine for his bride, Sybil Winslow. The massive center chimney had six outlets & the fireplace used for cooking is quite large. The house still has Georgian wood paneling & sliding window shutters. The property was later owned by the Horace French family from roughly 1850 to 1928.

The house is one of six in the Steep Brook area considered to be the best representatives of the pre-industrial period of the city's history.

It was added to the National Register of Historic Places on February 16, 1983.

== See also ==
- National Register of Historic Places listings in Fall River, Massachusetts
- Borden-Winslow House
- Squire William B. Canedy House
- Luther Winslow, Jr., House
