= Belmont Club (Fall River, Massachusetts) =

Historic house in Massachusetts, United States

- Belmont Club/John Young House
- U.S. National Register of Historic Places
- U.S. Historic district – Contributing property
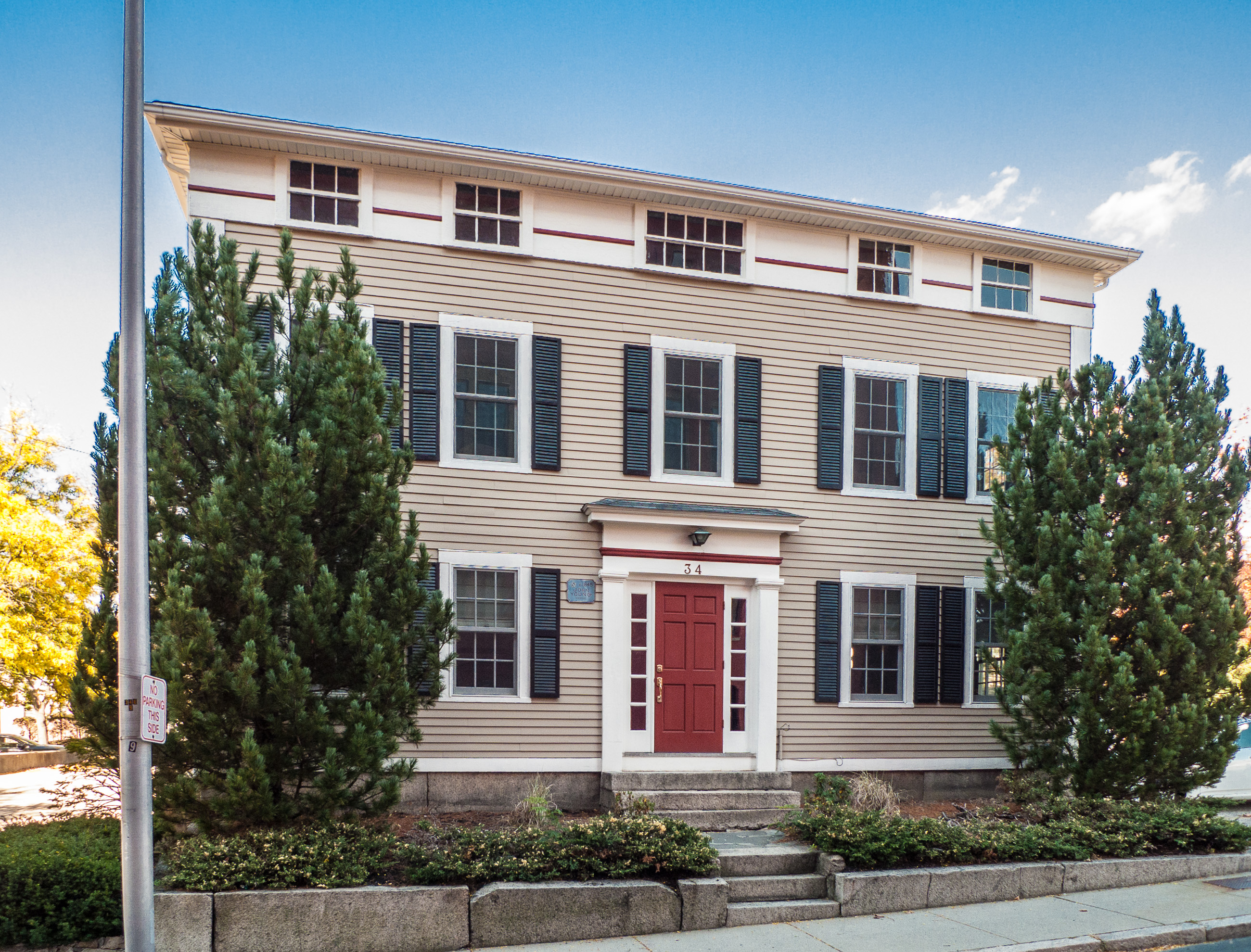
- The house in 2013

- Location within Massachusetts Location within the United States
- Location: 34 Franklin St., Fall River, Massachusetts
- Coordinates: 41.7035°N 71.1544°W
- Built: 1845
- Architect: John Young
- Architectural style: Greek Revival
- Part of: Downtown Fall River Historic District (ID83000662)
- MPS: Fall River MRA
- NRHP reference No.: 83000624

Significant dates
- Added to NRHP: February 16, 1983
- Designated CP: February 16, 1983

The Belmont Club, also known as the John Young House, is a historic house on Franklin Street in Fall River, Massachusetts. The house was built in 1845, and is one of the few surviving homes built close to the city's business district soon after the devastating 1843 fire. It was purchased by the Belmont Club in 1934. The club reopened under new ownership in December 2012.

The house was listed on the National Register of Historic Places in 1983, and included in the Downtown Fall River Historic District in 1985.

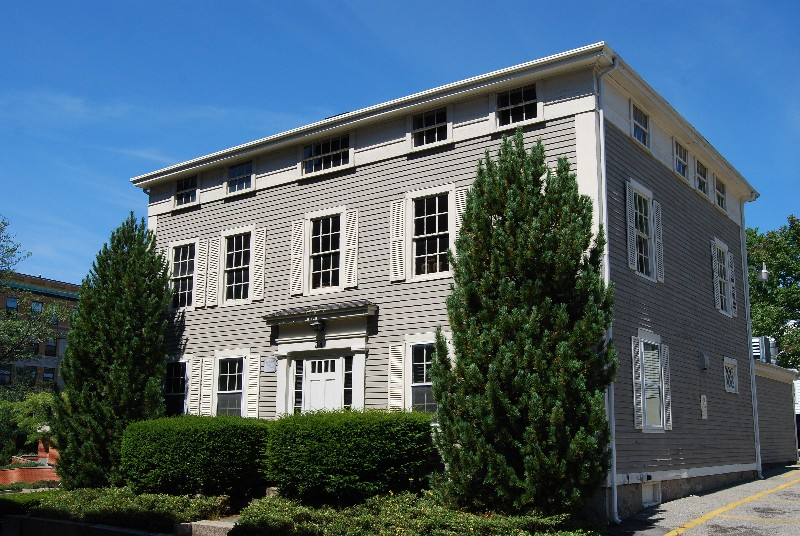
The house in 2007

== See also ==
- National Register of Historic Places listings in Fall River, Massachusetts
