= North Christian Congregational Church =

Historic church in Massachusetts, United States

- U.S. National Register of Historic Places
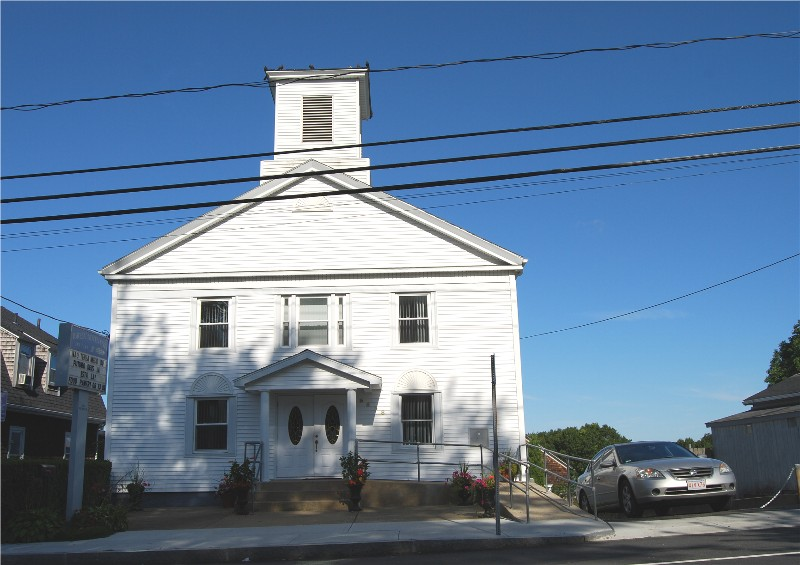

- Location within Massachusetts Location within the United States
- Location: Fall River, Massachusetts
- Coordinates: 41°44′39″N 71°7′40″W
- Built: 1842
- Architectural style: Gothic
- MPS: Fall River MRA
- NRHP reference No.: 83000696
- Added to NRHP: February 16, 1983

North Christian Congregational Church is a historic church located at 3538 North Main Street in Fall River, Massachusetts. The church was built circa 1842 and was added to the National Register of Historic Places in 1983. The church is a rare survivor, as most of the other first period churches in the city were located downtown and have not survived. It is one of the few remaining public buildings left in the Steep Brook area of Fall River.

== History ==
In 1835 Capt. John Read and C. C. Dillingham of the First Congregational Church organized a Sunday School and meetings were held in the school house until Caroline Boomer donated the land and the church was built in 1842. North Christian Church was founded as the First Protestant Church in the rural Steep Brook section of Fall River. In 1933 it merged with the Congregational Churches, and in 1960 it merged with the United Church of Christ. The church was completely renovated in 1974.

More recently, the building exterior has been covered with vinyl siding, and many of the historic Greek Revival details have been removed, including the original windows The church is now used by the Fall River Portuguese Seventh-day Adventist Church.

== See also ==
- National Register of Historic Places listings in Fall River, Massachusetts
