= A. B. Chace Rowhouses =

- U.S. National Register of Historic Places
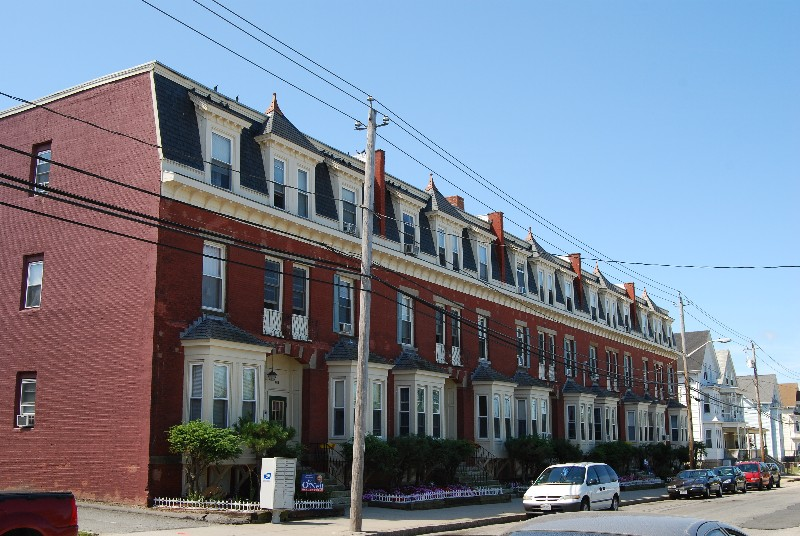

- Location within Massachusetts Location within the United States
- Location: Fall River, Massachusetts
- Coordinates: 41°42′9″N 71°10′0″W
- Built: 1877
- Architectural style: Queen Anne
- MPS: Fall River MRA
- NRHP reference No.: 83000647
- Added to NRHP: February 16, 1983

The A.B. Chace Rowhouses is a historic apartment building located at 655-685 Middle Street in Fall River, Massachusetts. It was constructed circa 1877 for Arnold B. Chace, son of Elizabeth Buffum Chace, a prominent Rhode Island abolitionist and reformer.

The red brick rowhouse is unusual for Fall River, which is more typically dominated by triple-decker houses. (A smaller rowhouse complex is on lower Broadway, at the foot of Columbia St.) The Chace Rowhouse is located along the perimeter of Kennedy Park, not far from the historic St. Anne's Church complex.

== See also ==
- National Register of Historic Places listings in Fall River, Massachusetts
