= Sagamore Mills No. 1 and No. 3 =

- U.S. National Register of Historic Places
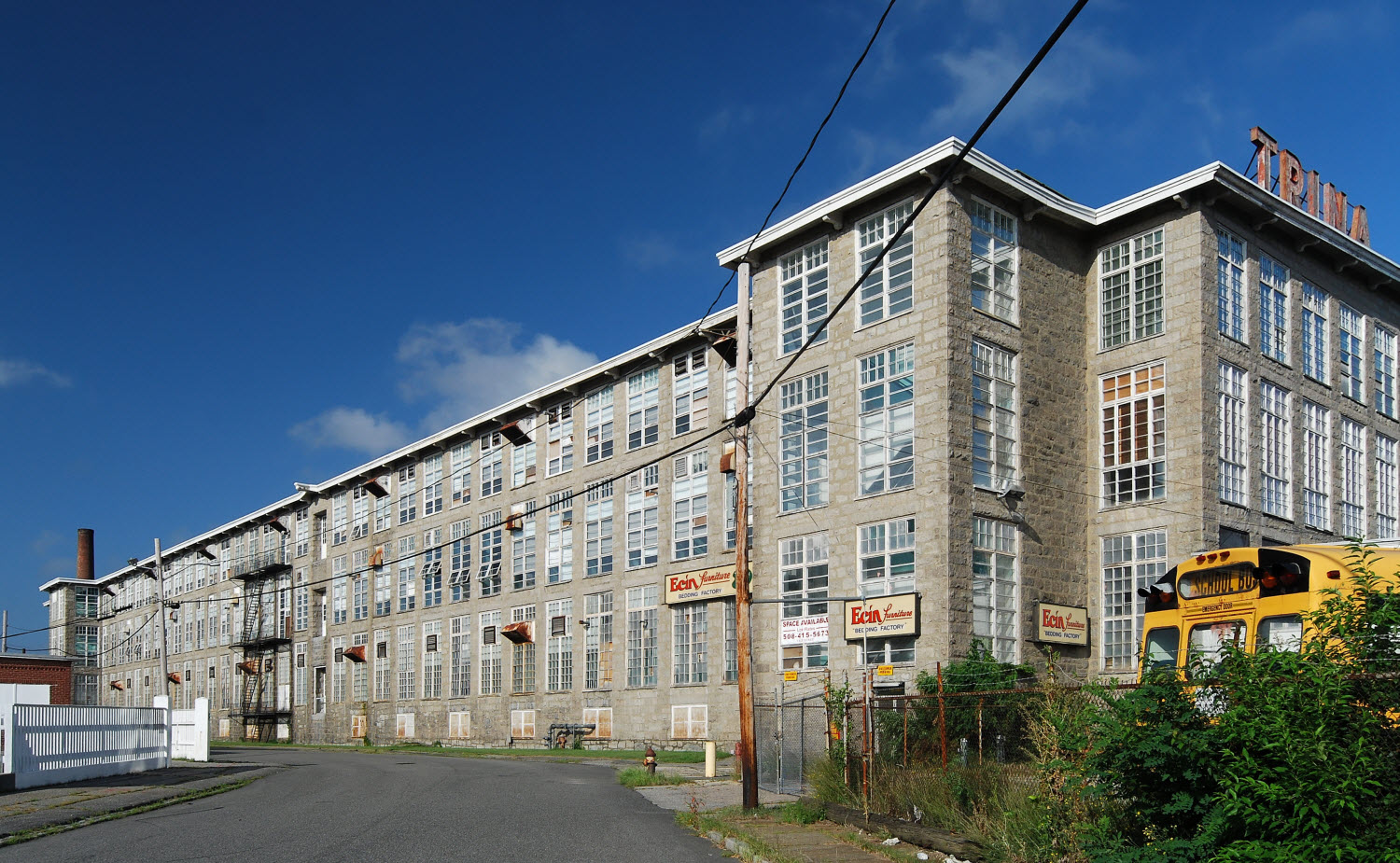
- Sagamore Mill No. 3

- Location within Massachusetts Location within the United States
- Location: Ace St., Fall River, Massachusetts
- Coordinates: 41°43′33″N 71°8′43″W
- Area: 35 acres (14 ha)
- Built: 1888 & 1908
- Architect: D. H. Dyer
- Architectural style: Romanesque
- MPS: Fall River MRA
- NRHP reference No.: 83000713
- Added to NRHP: February 16, 1983

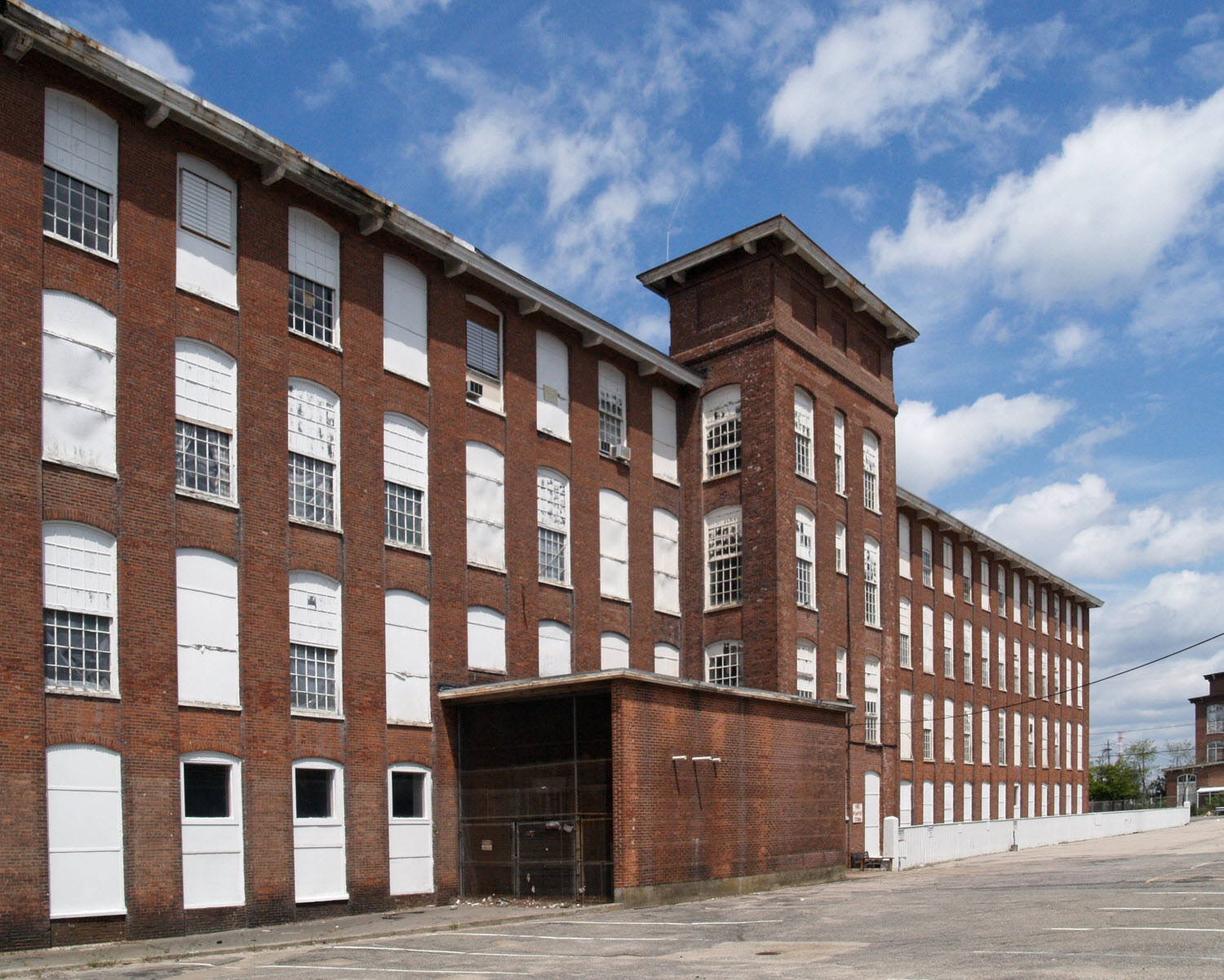
Sagamore Mill No. 1

Sagamore Mills No. 1 and No. 3 are two historic textile mills on Ace Street in Fall River, Massachusetts. Built in 1888 and 1908, they form part of one of the city's single largest textile operations of the late 19th century. Mills No. 1 and 3 were added to the National Register of Historic Places in 1983, with a separate listing for Mill No. 2, located nearby on North Main Street.

== Description ==
The Sagamore Mills No. 1 and No. 3 are located in northern Fall River, on a property now separated from the Taunton River by Massachusetts Route 79. The two mills are located on either side of Ace Street in an industrial setting west of North Main Street. Mill No. 1 is a four-story brick structure with Romanesque styling, including segmented-arch windows and a distinctive central tower. Mill No. 3 is built out of rusticated granite quarried in Assonet and transported here by rail., and is five stories in height. Each building has attached smaller buildings, and there are a number of small detached buildings on the 35-acre (14 ha) parcel. There are more than a dozen additional buildings in all.

== History ==
The Sagamore Mills company was established in 1872 with Louis L. Barnard as the first president. The original Mill No. 1 was constructed in 1872 from red brick.

The company failed in 1879, and was soon reorganized as the Sagamore Manufacturing Company. Mill No. 2 was added on nearby North Main Street in 1882. On April 24, 1884 Mill No. 1, was destroyed by fire, and was not rebuilt until 1888. Mill No. 3 was built in 1908. It is (along with Mill No. 2), one of the few mills located "below the hill" in Fall River that were constructed of granite rather than red brick, which was typically less expensive due to transport costs of the granite from the quarries located in the eastern part of the city.

The Sagamore Mills continued in operation until the 1960s, when the company closed down and sold off the buildings. Mill No. 3 is one of the largest single mill buildings constructed in the city. It was later occupied by Trina Manufacturing, Inc.

== See also ==
- National Register of Historic Places listings in Fall River, Massachusetts
- List of mills in Fall River, Massachusetts
- Sagamore Mill No. 2
