= S. Gourse & Sons Block =

- U.S. National Register of Historic Places
- Location within Massachusetts Location within the United States
- Location: 162-170 Pleasant St., Fall River, Massachusetts
- Coordinates: 41°42′0″N 71°9′9″W
- Built: 1899; 1926
- Architect: Joseph M. Darling; Edward M. Corbett
- Architectural style: Classical Revival
- NRHP reference No.: 100008429
- Added to NRHP: December 5, 2022

The S. Gourse & Sons Block is a historic commercial building located at 162-170 Pleasant Street in Fall River, Massachusetts. Built in two stages between 1896 and 1926, it is an architecturally distinctive surviving building in the city from that period, its two sections designed by prominent local architects. The building was listed on the National Register of Historic Places in 2022; The building has been converted to residential use.

== Description and history ==
The S. Gourse & Sons Block is located a short way east of Fall River's City Hall, on the north side of Pleasant Street between Troy and 6th Streets. It is a four-story masonry structure, built of brick with stone and metal trim. It consists of two separate buildings, which have been conjoined since the construction of the second building in 1926. The older building, constructed 1896–99, has three storefronts on the ground floor and eight window bays on the upper floors. It is stylistically a simple version of the Classical Revival, with stone sills and headers; the headers of the third-floor windows form a continuous band. The 1926 building is three bays wide, and has more elaborate styling. Its upper window bays are separated by pilasters, and there is a dentillated cornice beneath a tiered parapet at the roof line. The interior has been extensively renovated to provide residential housing.

The 1899 building was designed by Joseph M. Darling, and the 1926 building was designed by Edward M. Corbett; both were prominent local architects. The ground-floor storefront of the 1899 building was initially occupied by Simon Gourse's retail clothing business. Gourse eventually purchased the entire building, and oversaw its expansion in 1926. The building is a rare surviving structure from the period in Fall River's downtown area, which suffered from a major fire in 1928, and then the construction of Interstate 195 in the 1970s.

== See also ==
- National Register of Historic Places listings in Fall River, Massachusetts
- Corky Row Historic District
