= Ashley House (Fall River, Massachusetts) =

Historic house in Massachusetts, United States

- U.S. National Register of Historic Places
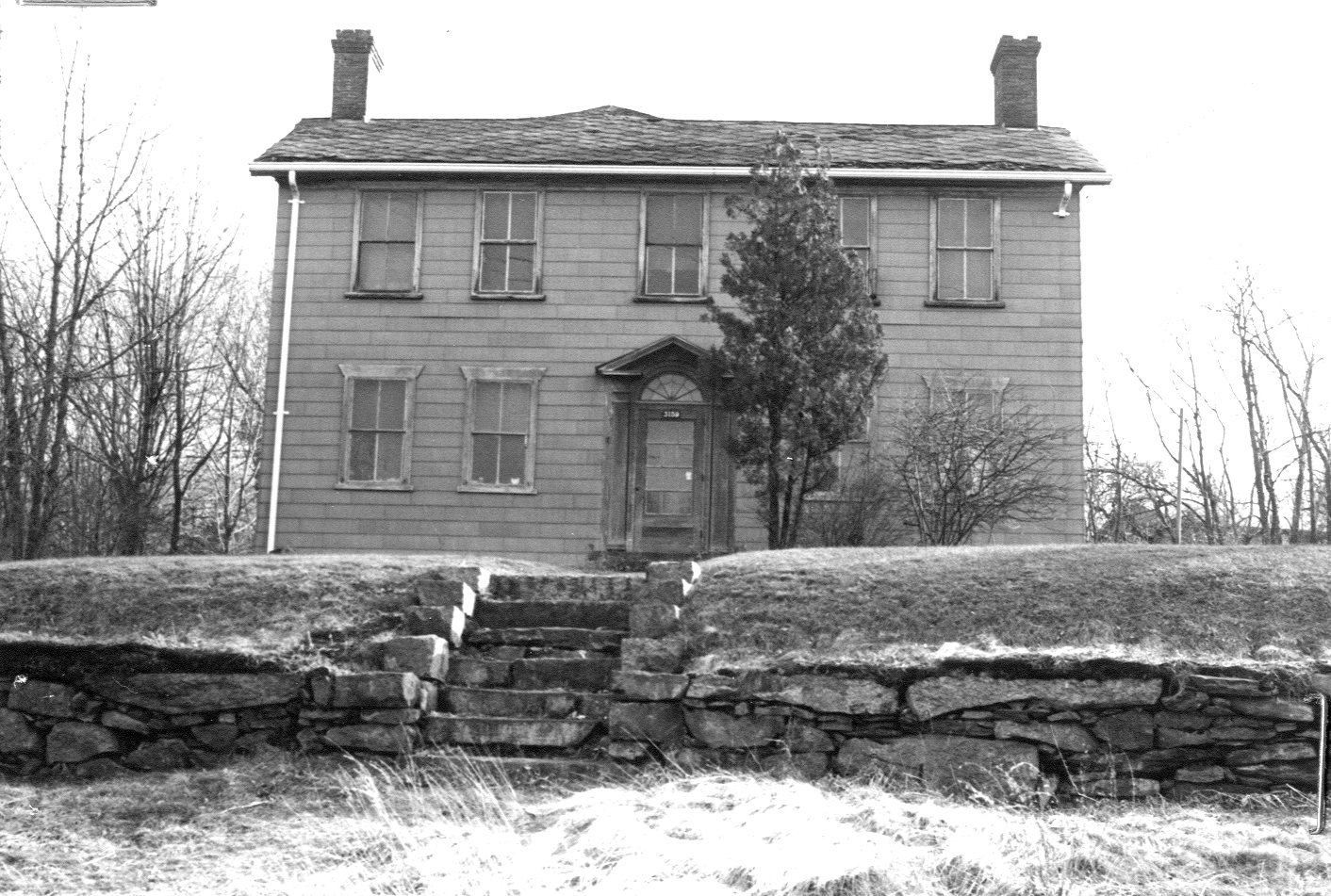

- Location within Massachusetts
- Location: 3159 Main St., Fall River, Massachusetts
- Coordinates: 41°44′21″N 71°7′49″W
- Built: c. 1750
- Architectural style: Federal
- MPS: Fall River MRA
- NRHP reference No.: 83000621
- Added to NRHP: February 16, 1983

The Ashley House (also known as Aunt Polly's House) was a historic house located at 3159 North Main Street in Fall River, Massachusetts.

== Description and history ==
The house was built in about 1750 in the Steep Brook section of the town, which was then still part of Freetown. It was a 2 1/2-story, wood-framed structure, five bays wide, with a side-gable roof and clapboard siding. It was one of the only Federal-period with a pedimented doorway that included a half-round fanlight.

It was added to the National Register of Historic Places on February 16, 1983.

The house was dismantled in July 1983, only 5 months after its designation as a landmark. The site is now owned by the New England Power Company.

== See also ==
- National Register of Historic Places listings in Fall River, Massachusetts
