= Unitarian Society (Fall River) =

Historic church in Massachusetts, United States

- The Unitarian Society
- U.S. National Register of Historic Places
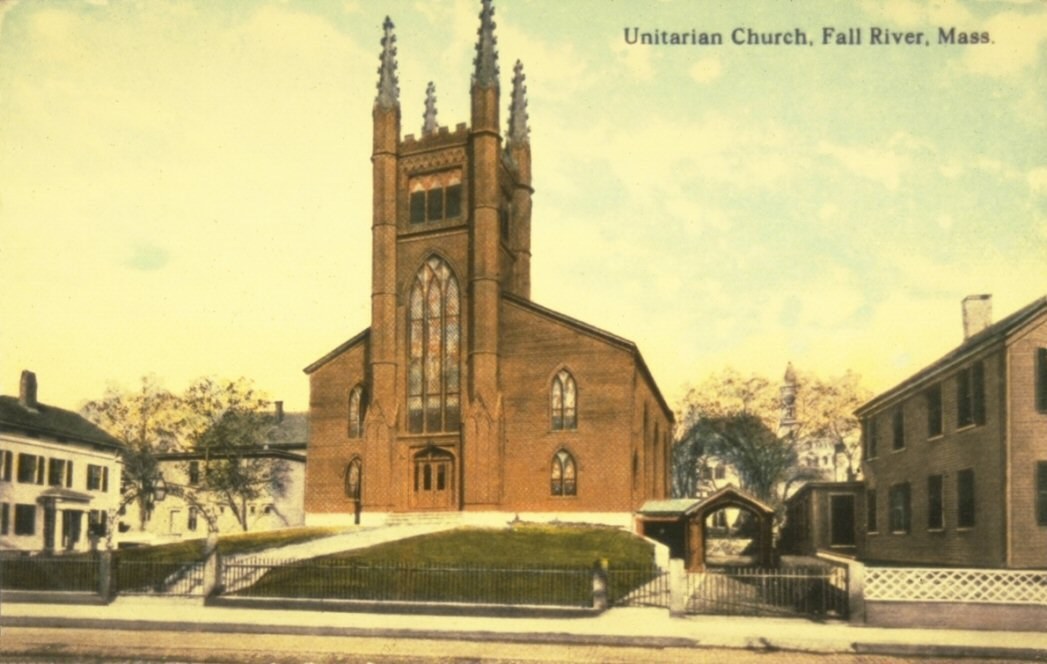
- The former Unitarian Society Church, destroyed by fire, 1983

- Location within Massachusetts Location within the United States
- Location: 309 North Main Street, Fall River, Massachusetts
- Coordinates: 41°42′22″N 71°9′17″W
- Built: 1835
- Architectural style: Gothic Revival
- NRHP reference No.: 82004958
- Added to NRHP: May 13, 1982

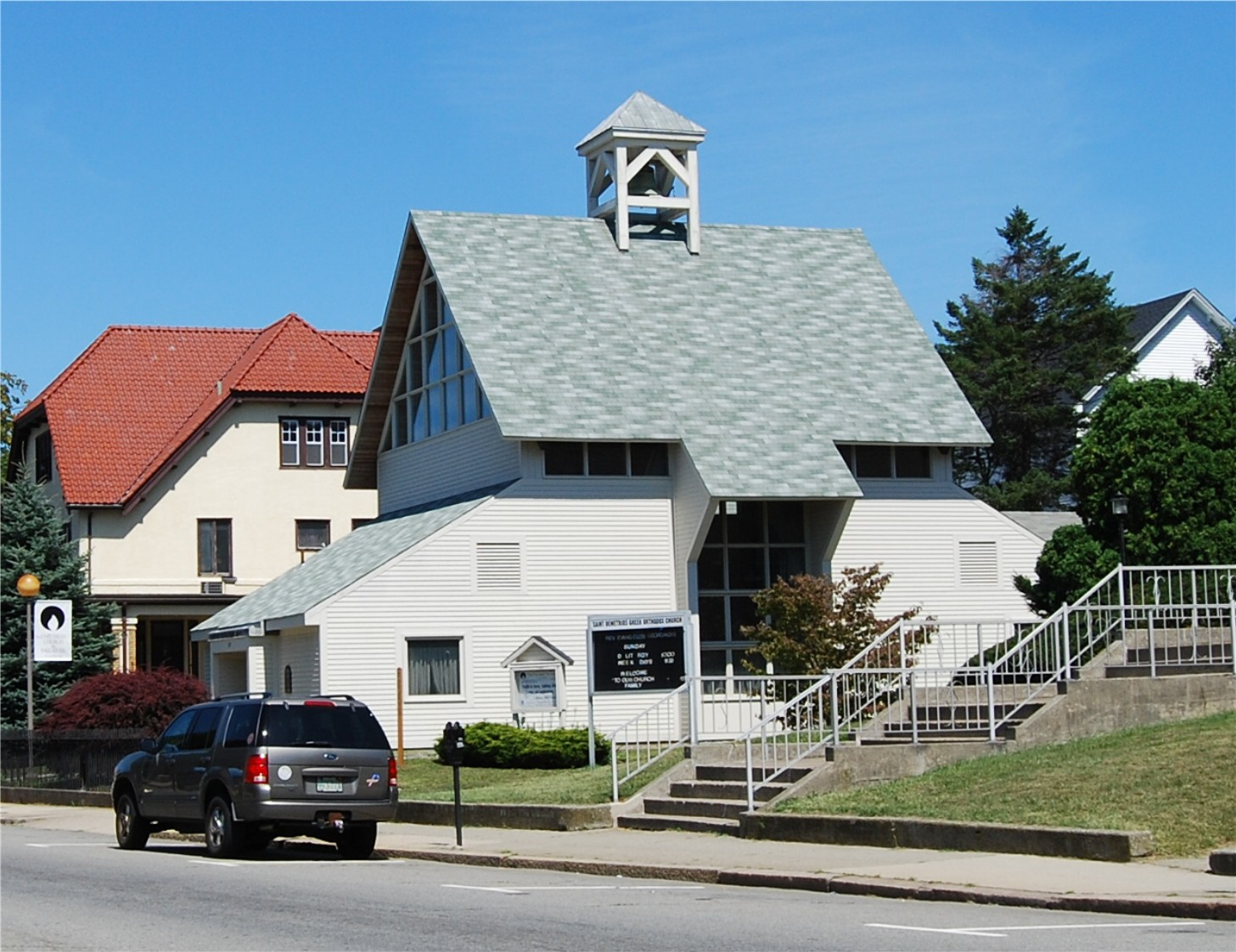
The new church

The Unitarian Society was a historic church building located in Fall River, Massachusetts.

== History ==
The church was built in 1835 and added to the National Register of Historic Places in 1982. The church was originally built at the corner of Second and Borden streets. In 1861, it was dismantled and rebuilt on North Main Street.

Samuel Longfellow was ordained and installed as minister of the church in February, 1848. His brother Henry Wadsworth Longfellow furnished the hymn for the ceremony. Samuel Longfellow's ministry in Fall River lasted 3 years.

The church was destroyed by fire on September 2, 1983. It was the oldest church in the city at the time. However, surviving the fire was a Paul Revere bell, one ornate stained glass window, two plaques, a pulpit, and the baptismal font. A new church was later built at the same location, in a new style (see image below).

== See also ==
- National Register of Historic Places listings in Fall River, Massachusetts
