= Bristol County Superior Court (Fall River, Massachusetts) =

- U.S. National Register of Historic Places
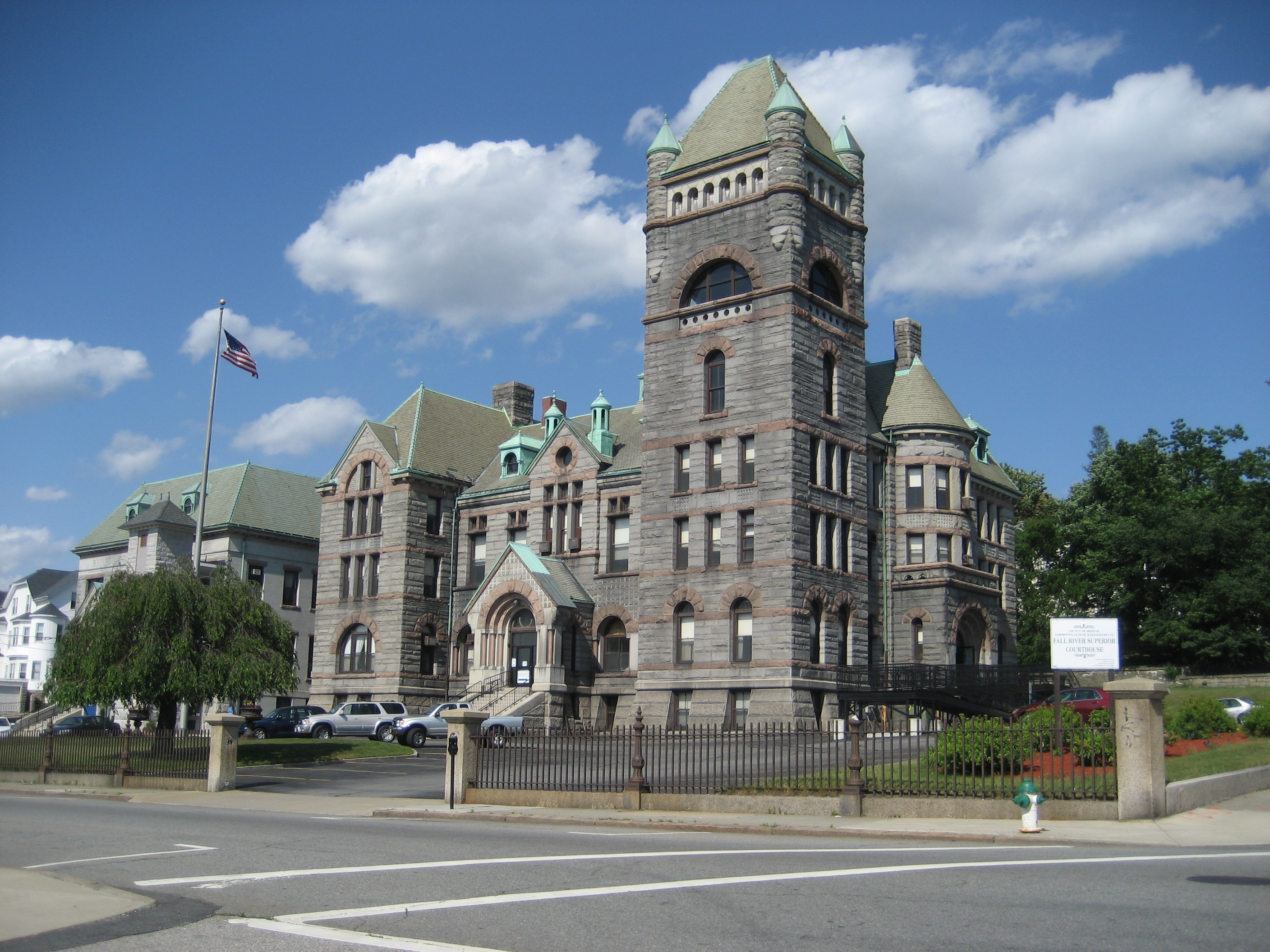

- Location within Massachusetts Location within the United States
- Location: Fall River, Massachusetts
- Coordinates: 41°42′29″N 71°9′16″W
- Built: 1889
- Architect: Robert H. Slack; Edward M. Corbett
- Architectural style: Romanesque
- MPS: Fall River MRA
- NRHP reference No.: 83000638
- Added to NRHP: February 16, 1983

The Bristol County Superior Court is a historic courthouse at 441 N. Main Street in Fall River, Massachusetts. It is a monumental three story granite structure, with a five-story square tower at one corner. The oldest portion of the building, the main courthouse was designed by New Bedford architect Robert H. Slack, and was completed in 1889. Connected to the courthouse is the deed registry, a similar structure built in 1930 to a design by Fall River architect Edward M. Corbett. The building is Fall River's finest and most imposing example of Richardsonian Romanesque architecture.

The building was listed on the National Register of Historic Places in 1983.

== See also ==
- National Register of Historic Places listings in Fall River, Massachusetts
