= Ariadne J. and Mary A. Borden House =

Historic house in Massachusetts, United States

- U.S. National Register of Historic Places
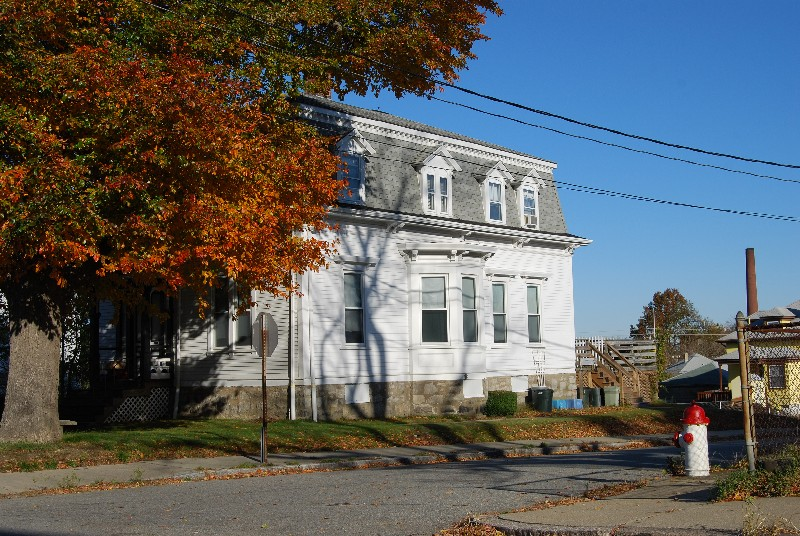

- Location within Massachusetts Location within the United States
- Location: 92 Globe St., Fall River, Massachusetts
- Coordinates: 41°41′55″N 71°10′47″W
- Built: 1882
- Architectural style: Second Empire
- MPS: Fall River MRA
- NRHP reference No.: 83000630
- Added to NRHP: February 16, 1983

The Ariadne J. and Mary A. Borden House is a historic house located at 92 Globe Street in Fall River, Massachusetts.

== Description and history ==
It is a two-story, wood-framed structure designed in the Second Empire style, complete with a mansard roof pierced by dormers, paired sawn brackets at the eaves, and a single-story bracketed porch. It was built in 1882 for Ariadne and Mary Borden, sisters who were both principals of grammar schools (and distant relations to Lizzie Borden's father). The structure is considered one of the best examples of a small two-story mansard cottage in the city.

It was added to the National Register of Historic Places on February 16, 1983.

== See also ==
- National Register of Historic Places listings in Fall River, Massachusetts
