= Pine Street School =

- U.S. National Register of Historic Places
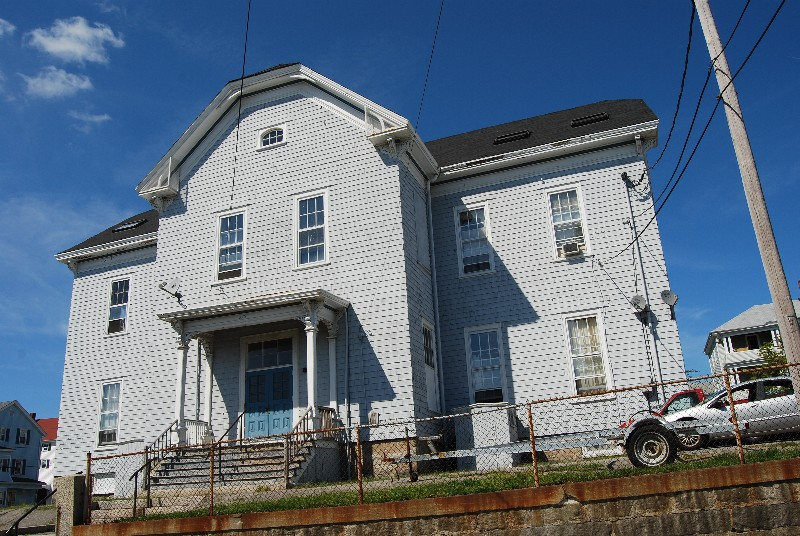

- Location within Massachusetts Location within the United States
- Location: Fall River, Massachusetts
- Coordinates: 41°42′9″N 71°8′39″W
- Built: 1876
- Architectural style: Italianate
- MPS: Fall River MRA
- NRHP reference No.: 83000705
- Added to NRHP: February 16, 1983

The Pine Street School is a historic former school building located at 880 Pine Street in Fall River, Massachusetts. The wood-framed school was built in 1876 in the Italianate style. It was built in a particularly restrained style after complaints were made about the cost associated with the elaborate decorations of the Border City School (now demolished). It was added to the National Register of Historic Places in 1983. At that time, it was the oldest school building in the city still in use. It was converted into apartments in the late 1980s.

== See also ==
- National Register of Historic Places listings in Fall River, Massachusetts
