= Woman's Club of Fall River =

- U.S. National Register of Historic Places
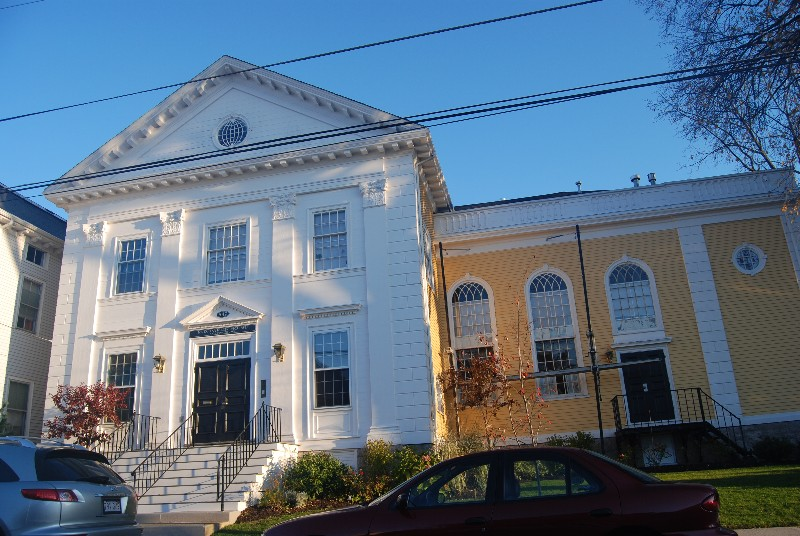

- Location within Massachusetts Location within the United States
- Location: Fall River, Massachusetts
- Coordinates: 41°42′56″N 71°8′59″W
- Built: 1897
- Architect: Maude Darling Parlin
- Architectural style: Colonial Revival
- MPS: Fall River MRA
- NRHP reference No.: 83000733
- Added to NRHP: February 16, 1983

The Woman's Club of Fall River is a historic building at 1542 Walnut Street in Fall River, Massachusetts. It was originally constructed in 1897 and remodeled in 1925 in the Colonial Revival style, by local architect Maude Darling Parlin, a graduate of the Massachusetts Institute of Technology. Notable Colonial Revival features include the projecting entrance pavilion, which has a fully pedimented gable with oriel window, Corinthian pilasters separating the baysm and a pedimented entry with transom window.

The building was originally a private school. During the 1910s it served as St. Paul's Evangelical Lutheran Church before its adaptation for use by the Woman's Club.

It was added to the National Register of Historic Places in 1983.

== See also ==
- National Register of Historic Places listings in Fall River, Massachusetts
