= House at 108–112 Quarry Street =

Historic house in Massachusetts, United States

- U.S. National Register of Historic Places
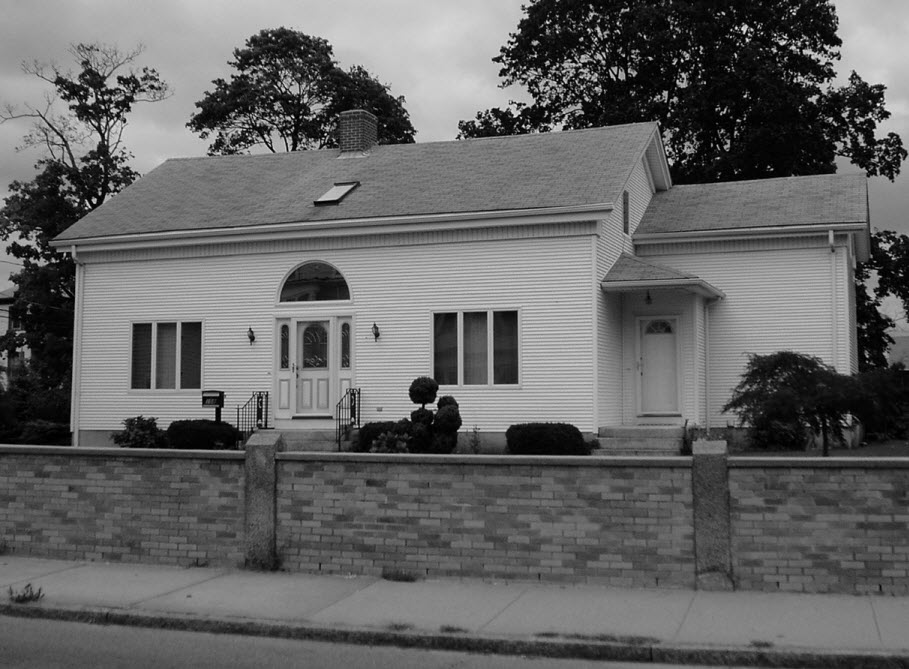

- Location within Massachusetts
- Location: 108–112 Quarry St., Fall River, Massachusetts
- Coordinates: 41°42′23″N 71°8′26″W
- Built: 1850
- Architectural style: Greek Revival
- MPS: Fall River MRA
- NRHP reference No.: 83000683
- Added to NRHP: February 16, 1983

108–112 Quarry Street is a historic house located in Fall River, Massachusetts. The 1 1/2-story house was built in 1850.

== Description and history ==
At that time, it was considered to be a Greek Revival cottage in "pristine condition, representative of the best mid-19th century vernacular architecture in Fall River", with its original clapboard siding, windows, doors and detailing. However, since then, it has been significantly altered, with vinyl siding added and original doors, windows and detailing removed.

It was added to the National Register of Historic Places on February 16, 1983.

== See also ==
- National Register of Historic Places listings in Fall River, Massachusetts
