= Davol School =

- U.S. National Register of Historic Places
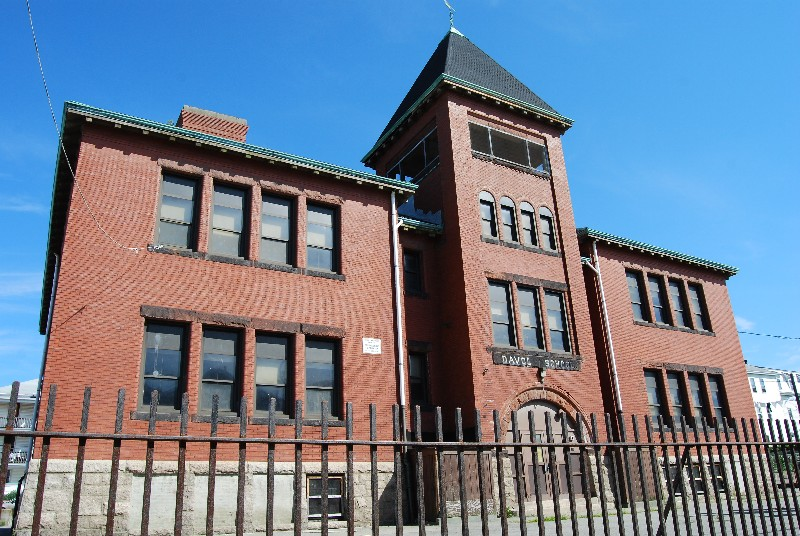

- Location within Massachusetts Location within the United States
- Location: Fall River, Massachusetts
- Coordinates: 41°41′35″N 71°08′07″W
- Built: 1892
- Architect: Joseph M. Darling
- Architectural style: Romanesque
- MPS: Fall River MRA
- NRHP reference No.: 83000661
- Added to NRHP: February 16, 1983

Davol School is a historic school at 112 Flint Street in Fall River, Massachusetts. It was built in 1892 and added to the National Register of Historic Places in 1983. The eight room elementary schoolhouse was designed by notable city architect Joseph M. Darling, on the same plan as Connell School located on Plymouth Avenue. The brick Romanesque Revival structure is two stories in height, with a projecting entry section that is topped by a square tower with an open belfry and pyramidal roof. The school was built during a major expansion of the school system, increasing the number of classrooms by 20%.

The school was closed by the city in 2007.

== See also ==
- National Register of Historic Places listings in Fall River, Massachusetts
