= Hathaway Brightman House =

Historic house in Massachusetts, United States

- U.S. National Register of Historic Places
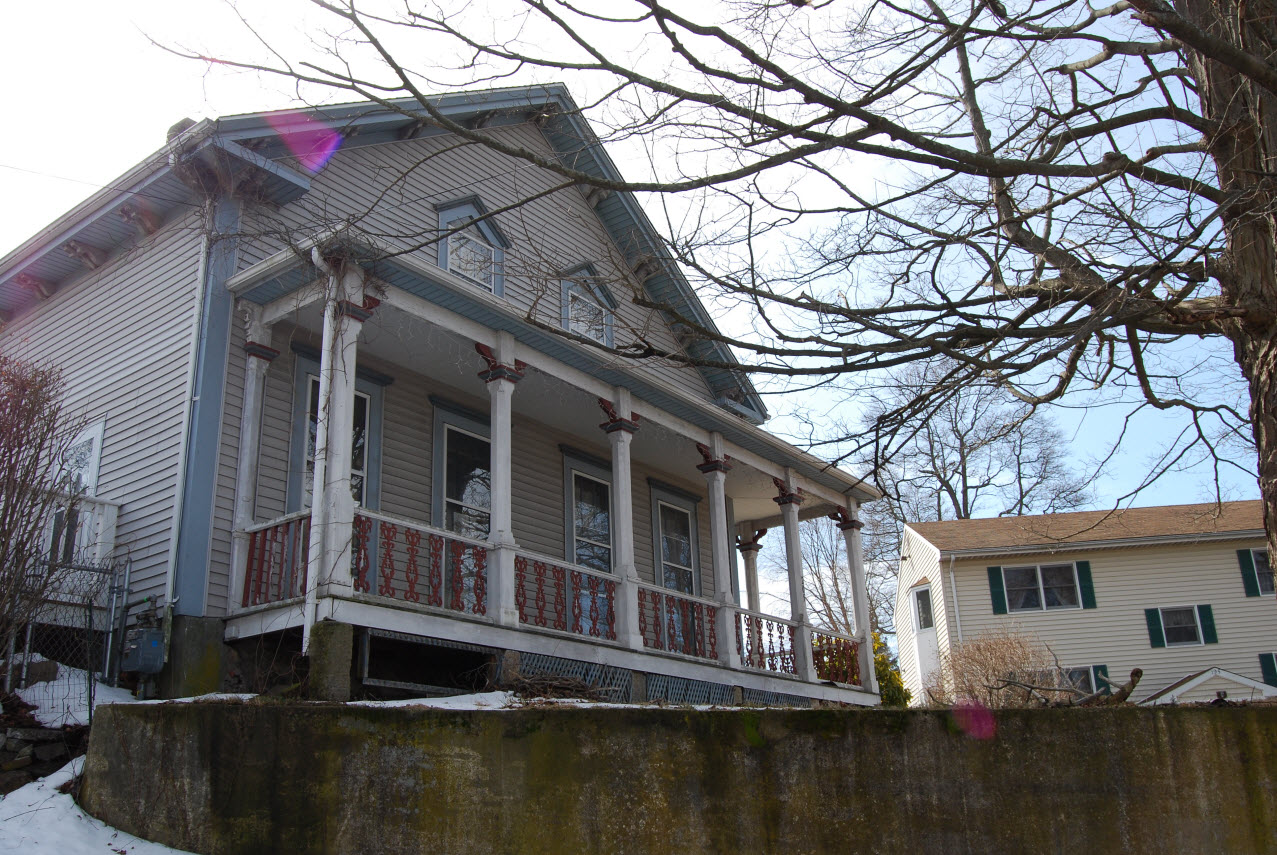
- 205 Crescent Street

- Location within Massachusetts Location within the United States
- Location: 205 Crescent St., Fall River, Massachusetts
- Coordinates: 41°43′32.05″N 71°8′25.58″W
- Built: c. 1858
- Architectural style: Gothic
- MPS: Fall River MRA
- NRHP reference No.: 83000637
- Added to NRHP: February 16, 1983

The Hathaway Brightman House is a historic house located at 205 Crescent Street in Fall River, Massachusetts, in the Border City neighborhood.

== Description and history ==
It is a 1 1/2-story, wood-framed structure, four bays wide, with a side gable roof that has a front-facing gable with bracketed eave. The house was built in about 1858 and added to the National Register of Historic Places in 1983. It is considered a particularly fine example of a mid-19th century Victorian Gothic cottage. It features a "pine tree" Palladian window above the entrance.

== See also ==
- National Register of Historic Places listings in Fall River, Massachusetts
