= Boguslavsky Triple-Deckers =

- U.S. National Register of Historic Places
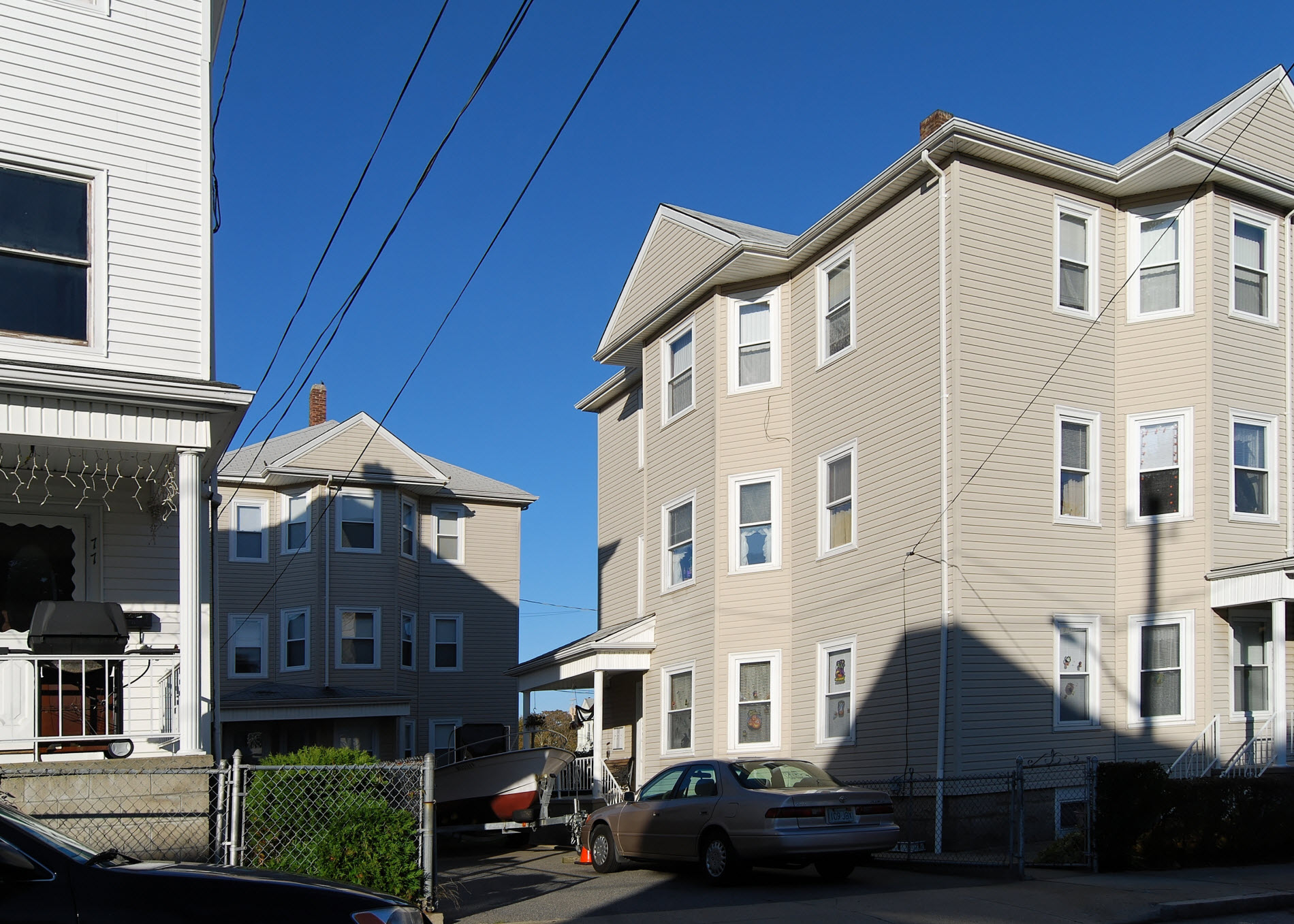

- Location within Massachusetts Location within the United States
- Location: 53–87 Albion St., Fall River, Massachusetts
- Coordinates: 41°41′49″N 71°7′59″W
- Built: 1916
- MPS: Fall River MRA
- NRHP reference No.: 83000628
- Added to NRHP: February 16, 1983

The Boguslavsky Triple-Deckers is a group of six historic triple-decker tenement houses at 53-87 Albion Street in Fall River, Massachusetts. They were built in 1916 and added to the National Register of Historic Places in 1983.

The houses were constructed for David Boguslavsky, a pedlar, by Athanase Dussault, a local carpenter. They are representative of one of the dominant housing type built in the city during the late 19th and early 20th centuries.

Since the 1983 listing, the buildings' wood shingles have been covered with vinyl siding and the front porches and decorative wood details have been removed.

== See also ==
- National Register of Historic Places listings in Fall River, Massachusetts
