= William M. Connell School =

- U.S. National Register of Historic Places
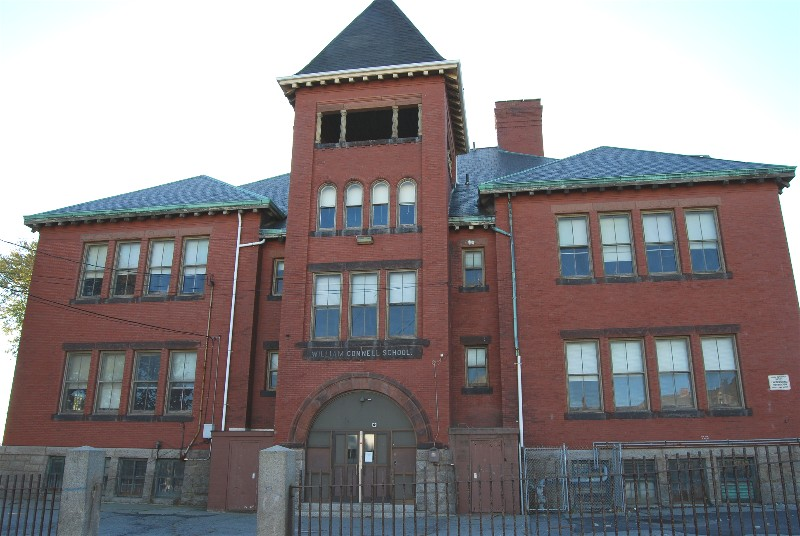

- Location within Massachusetts Location within the United States
- Location: Fall River, Massachusetts
- Coordinates: 41°42′8″N 71°9′23″W
- Built: 1893
- Architect: Joseph M. Darling
- Architectural style: Romanesque
- MPS: Fall River MRA
- NRHP reference No.: 83000655
- Added to NRHP: February 16, 1983

William M. Connell School is a historic school located at 650 Plymouth Avenue in Fall River, Massachusetts. It was built in 1893 and added to the National Register of Historic Places in 1983. It was designed by notable city architect Joseph M. Darling on the same plan as the Davol School. The school is named after William Connell, who served as the city's Superintendent of Schools from 1872 to 1894.

The Connell School was one of about a dozen elementary schools closed in June 2008 by the city, with the opening of several new, larger buildings.

== See also ==
- National Register of Historic Places listings in Fall River, Massachusetts
