= John M. Earle House =

Historic house in Massachusetts, United States

- U.S. National Register of Historic Places
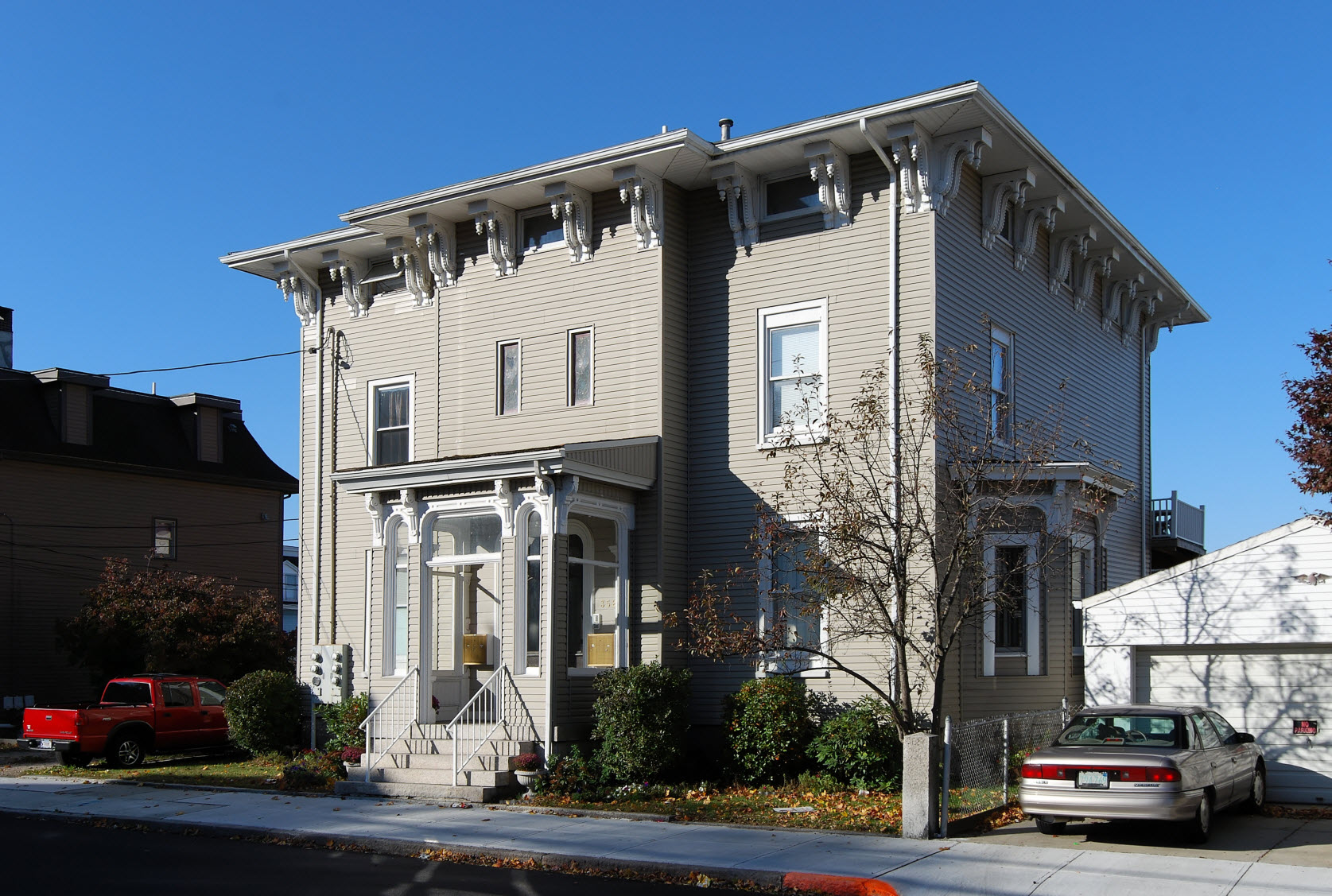

- Location within Massachusetts Location within the United States
- Location: 352 Durfee Street, Fall River, Massachusetts
- Coordinates: 41°42′26.3″N 71°9′22.1″W
- Built: 1870
- Architectural style: Italianate
- MPS: Fall River MRA
- NRHP reference No.: 83000665
- Added to NRHP: February 16, 1983

The John M. Earle House is a historic house located in Fall River, Massachusetts, United States. It was built in 1870 by John M. Earle, a carpenter, in the Italianate Villa style. The Earle House is located on Durfee Street in a gentrifying neighborhood which has experienced commercial encroachment from downtown.

It was added to the National Register of Historic Places in 1983. Since that time, the house has been significantly altered with much of the original wood details removed, including quoins, and covered with vinyl siding. The original windows have also been replaced.

== See also ==
- National Register of Historic Places listings in Fall River, Massachusetts
