= Brayton Methodist Episcopal Church =

Historic church in Massachusetts, United States

- U.S. National Register of Historic Places
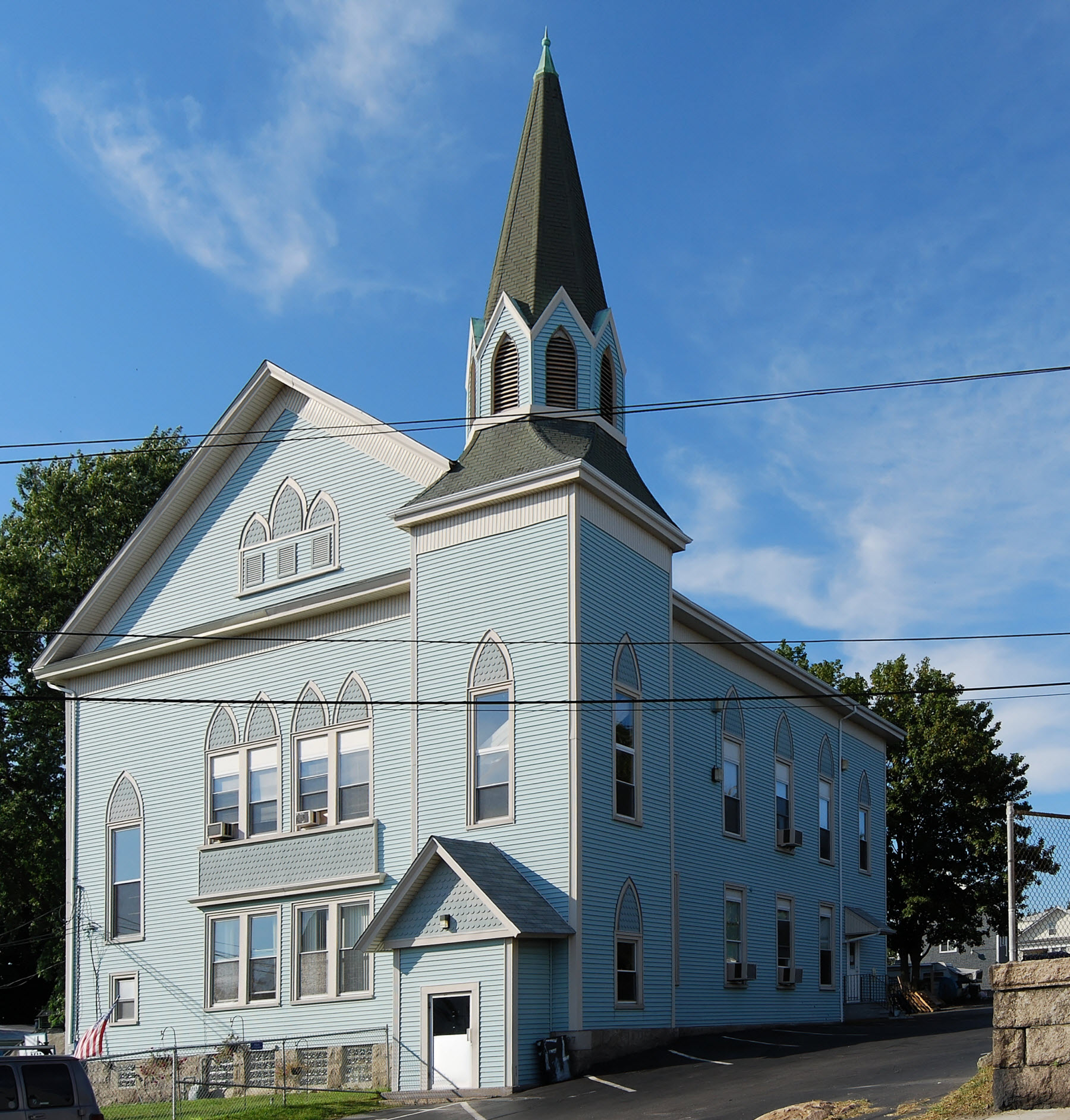

- Location within Massachusetts Location within the United States
- Location: Fall River, Massachusetts
- Coordinates: 41°41′20″N 71°10′12″W
- Built: 1897
- Architect: Charles H. Farnham
- Architectural style: Late Victorian Gothic
- MPS: Fall River MRA
- NRHP reference No.: 83000635
- Added to NRHP: February 16, 1983

Brayton Methodist Episcopal Church is an historic former Methodist church building located at 264 Griffin Street in Fall River, Massachusetts. The wooden Gothic Revival church building was constructed in 1897 through the generosity of John Summerfield Brayton and his sister Mary Brayton Young. It was designed by local architect Charles H. Farnham.

The church was unique in that it was built by and named for the Braytons, a prominent local family, yet it was a "mill-workers'" church, located in the southern section of the city near several mills. The church, a handsome vernacular example of Late Victorian Gothic style.

The building was added to the National Register of Historic Places in 1983. The building is now owned by Citizens for Citizens, a non-profit social agency.

== See also ==
- National Register of Historic Places listings in Fall River, Massachusetts
