= Chase–Hyde Farm =

- U.S. National Register of Historic Places
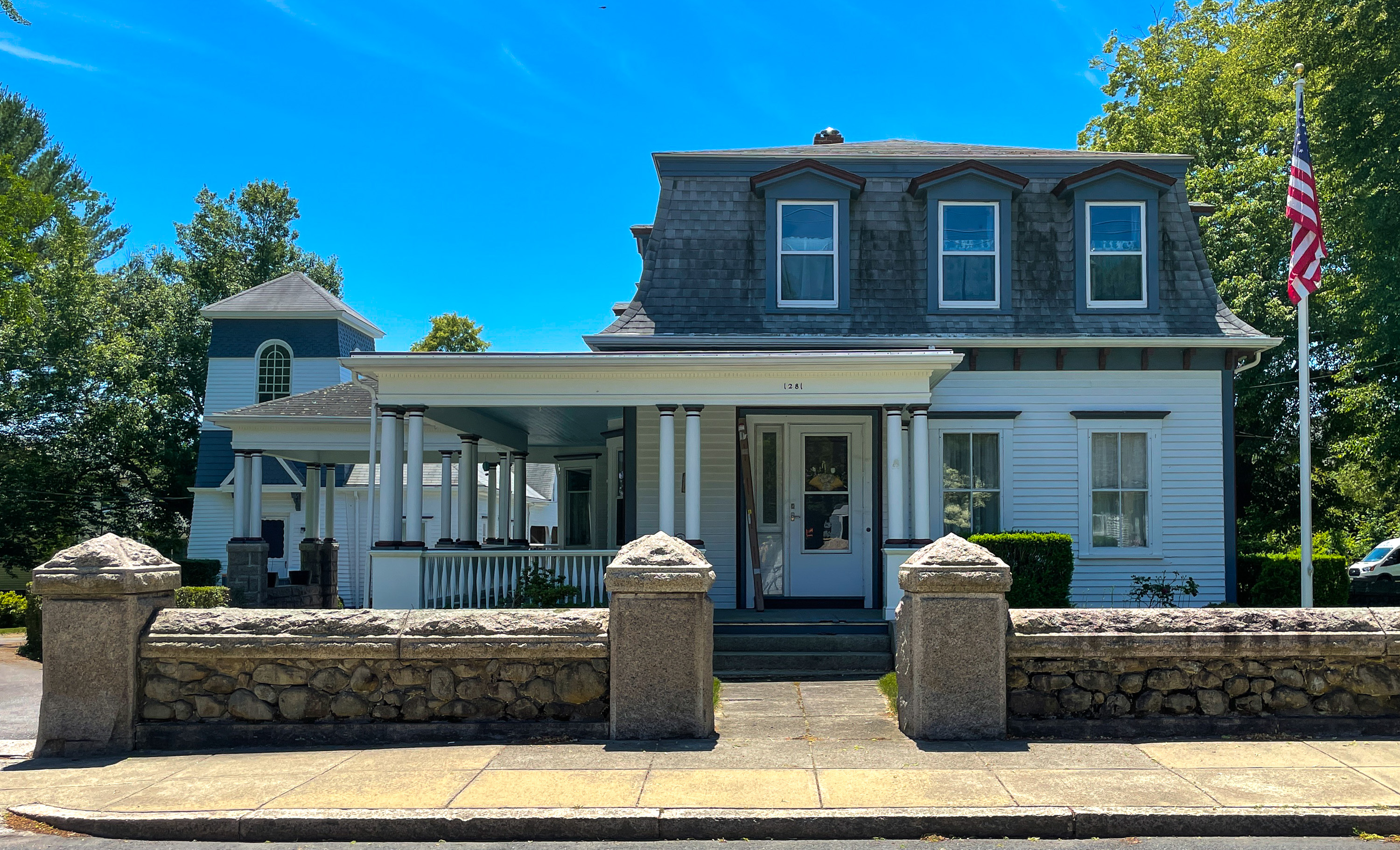

- Location within Massachusetts Location within the United States
- Location: Fall River, Massachusetts
- Coordinates: 41°43′3″N 71°7′32″W
- Built: 1879
- Architectural style: Second Empire
- MPS: Fall River MRA
- NRHP reference No.: 83000651
- Added to NRHP: February 16, 1983

Chase–Hyde Farm is a historic property located at 1281-1291 New Boston Road in Fall River, Massachusetts. The two-story main house with a mansard roof was built in 1879 for Abraham & Abby Chase. By 1893 the property was owned by Samuel Hyde, who operated a stock farm here. Hyde added the two outbuildings in the 1890s and may also be responsible for the c.1900 porch and porte-cochere. The property is surrounded by a rugged fieldstone wall capped with local Fall River granite. It was added to the National Register of Historic Places in 1983.

== See also ==
- National Register of Historic Places listings in Fall River, Massachusetts
