= Algonquin Printing Co. =

- U.S. National Register of Historic Places
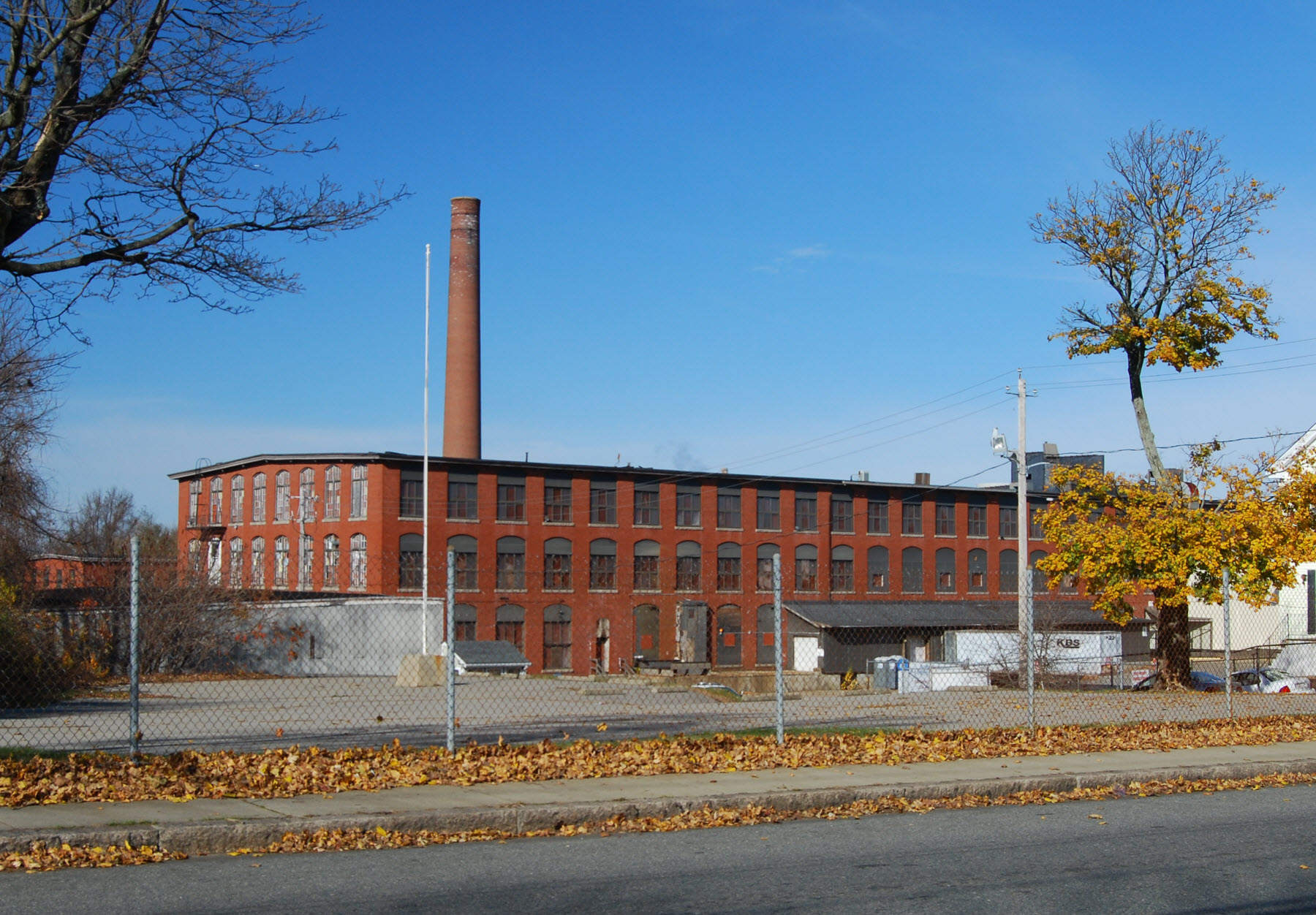

- Location within Massachusetts Location within the United States
- Location: 1 Middle St., Fall River, Massachusetts
- Coordinates: 41°41′42″N 71°10′40″W
- Built: 1891
- Architectural style: Colonial Revival
- MPS: Fall River MRA
- NRHP reference No.: 83000615
- Added to NRHP: February 16, 1983

The Algonquin Printing Co. is a historic industrial complex at 1 Middle Street, off Bay Street in Fall River, Massachusetts, United States. Developed beginning in 1891, it was the last 19th-century printing operation to be established in the city. The surviving main building was built in 1902, and the company operated on this site until 1941. It was listed on the National Register of Historic Places in 1983.

== Description and history ==
The former Algonquin Company plant is located on Fall River's west side, between Bay Street and the former Old Colony Railroad line, which runs along the southern bank of the Taunton River. The property was also historically served by a wharf located nearby on the riverbank. The plant's main building is a three-story brick structure, 250 feet (76 m) long, with segmented-arch windows and a low-pitch gabled roof with bracketed cornice. In front of this building, facing directly onto Bay Street, is the former office building, a Classical Revival single-story tan brick building.

The Algonquin Printing Company was founded in 1891, and specialized in calico printing. The oldest buildings, no longer extant, date from that time period, and the main mill was built in 1902. Production was 3,600 pieces per week in 1892 and 10,000 in 1911. The company moved its operations to Dighton in 1941.

The site was later occupied by Pioneer Finishing Corporation, and later Duro Textiles. On October 26, 2010, a fire, which was later deemed to be arson broke out in the boiler room portion of the mill complex, destroying several buildings. However, the main mill and other buildings were saved. The complex was vacant at the time of the fire.

== See also ==
- National Register of Historic Places listings in Fall River, Massachusetts
