= National Register of Historic Places listings in Fall River, Massachusetts =

The following properties in Fall River, Massachusetts are listed on the National Register of Historic Places. This is a subset of the National Register of Historic Places listings in Bristol County, Massachusetts.

Contents: Counties in Massachusetts

Barnstable | Berkshire | Bristol | Dukes | Essex | Franklin | Hampden | Hampshire | Middlesex | Nantucket | Norfolk | Plymouth | Suffolk | Worcester

This National Park Service list is complete through NPS recent listings posted May 22, 2026.

	Name on the Register	Image	Date listed	Location	City or town	Description
1	Academy Building	Academy Building	July 2, 1973 (#73000277)	S. Main St. 41°42′03″N 71°09′20″W	Fall River	
2	Al Mac's Diner-Restaurant	Al Mac's Diner-Restaurant	December 20, 1999 (#99001119)	135 President Ave. 41°42′58″N 71°09′17″W	Fall River	
3	Algonquin Printing Co.	Algonquin Printing Co.	February 16, 1983 (#83000615)	Bay St. 41°41′42″N 71°10′40″W	Fall River	
4	American Printing Co. and Metacomet Mill	American Printing Co. and Metacomet Mill	February 16, 1983 (#83000617)	Anawan St. 41°42′10″N 71°09′42″W	Fall River	
5	David M. Anthony House	David M. Anthony House	February 16, 1983 (#83000620)	368 N. Main St. 41°42′25″N 71°09′18″W	Fall River	
6	Ashley House	Ashley House	February 16, 1983 (#83000621)	3159 Main St. 41°44′21″N 71°07′49″W	Fall River	Dismantled July, 1983.
7	Ashworth Brothers Mill	Ashworth Brothers Mill	August 21, 2023 (#100009284)	89 Globe Mills Ave. 41°41′31″N 71°10′51″W	Fall River	
8	Barnard Mills	Barnard Mills	February 16, 1983 (#83000623)	641–657 Quarry St. 41°41′26″N 71°08′26″W	Fall River	Includes attached weave shed
9	Belmont Club/John Young House	Belmont Club/John Young House	February 16, 1983 (#83000624)	34 Franklin St. 41°42′13″N 71°09′17″W	Fall River	
10	Barnabus Blossom House	Barnabus Blossom House	February 16, 1983 (#83000627)	244 Grove St. 41°42′23″N 71°08′55″W	Fall River	
11	Boguslavsky Triple-Deckers	Boguslavsky Triple-Deckers	February 16, 1983 (#83000628)	53–87 Albion St. 41°41′49″N 71°07′59″W	Fall River	
12	A.J. Borden Building	A.J. Borden Building	February 16, 1983 (#83000629)	91–111 S. Main St. 41°42′05″N 71°09′30″W	Fall River	
13	Borden Flats Light Station	Borden Flats Light Station	June 15, 1987 (#87001528)	Taunton River; 41°42′18″N 71°10′40″W	Fall River	
14	Ariadne J. and Mary A. Borden House	Ariadne J. and Mary A. Borden House	February 16, 1983 (#83000630)	92 Globe St. 41°41′22″N 71°10′44″W	Fall River	
15	N. B. Borden School	N. B. Borden School	February 16, 1983 (#83000631)	43 Morgan St. 41°41′49″N 71°08′53″W	Fall River	
16	Borden-Winslow House	Borden-Winslow House	February 16, 1983 (#83000632)	3063 N. Main St. 41°43′34″N 71°08′02″W	Fall River	
17	Border City Mill No. 2	Border City Mill No. 2	June 28, 1990 (#90000999)	One Weaver St. 41°43′40″N 71°08′29″W	Fall River	Converted into apartments
18	Brayton Methodist Episcopal Church	Brayton Methodist Episcopal Church	February 16, 1983 (#83000635)	264 Griffin St. 41°41′20″N 71°10′12″W	Fall River	
19	Hathaway Brightman House	Hathaway Brightman House	February 16, 1983 (#83000637)	205 Crescent St. 41°44′04″N 71°08′28″W	Fall River	
20	Bristol County Superior Court	Bristol County Superior Court	February 16, 1983 (#83000638)	441 N. Main St. 41°42′29″N 71°09′16″W	Fall River	
21	Squire William B. Canedy House	Squire William B. Canedy House	February 16, 1983 (#83000640)	2634 N. Main St. 41°42′52″N 71°08′10″W	Fall River	
22	Cataract Engine Company No. 3	Cataract Engine Company No. 3	February 16, 1983 (#83000645)	116 Rock St. 41°42′12″N 71°09′14″W	Fall River	
23	Central Congregational Church	Central Congregational Church	February 16, 1983 (#83000646)	100 Rock St. 41°42′10″N 71°09′14″W	Fall River	Most recently occupied by International Institute of Culinary Arts
24	Chace Mills	Chace Mills	February 16, 1983 (#83000648)	Lewiston and Salem Sts. 41°41′30″N 71°08′47″W	Fall River	Weave shed burned in 1999, main mill saved
25	A. B. Chace Rowhouses	A. B. Chace Rowhouses	February 16, 1983 (#83000647)	655–685 Middle St. 41°42′09″N 71°10′00″W	Fall River	
26	Oliver Chace's Thread Mill	Oliver Chace's Thread Mill	February 16, 1983 (#83000649)	505 Bay St. 41°41′38″N 71°10′39″W	Fall River	oldest remaining mill in Fall River; later part of Connanicut Mills
27	Charlton Mill	Charlton Mill	February 16, 1983 (#83000650)	109 Howe St. 41°40′43″N 71°10′38″W	Fall River	weave shed demolished
28	Chase-Hyde Farm	Chase-Hyde Farm	February 16, 1983 (#83000651)	1281–1291 New Boston Rd. 41°43′03″N 71°07′32″W	Fall River	
29	Children's Home	Children's Home	February 16, 1983 (#83000652)	427 Robeson St. 41°42′53″N 71°08′39″W	Fall River	
30	Church of the Ascension	Church of the Ascension	February 16, 1983 (#83000653)	160 Rock St. 41°42′04″N 71°09′12″W	Fall River	
31	William Collins House	William Collins House	February 16, 1983 (#83000654)	3775 N. Main St. 41°43′15″N 71°07′29″W	Fall River	
32	William M. Connell School	William M. Connell School	February 16, 1983 (#83000655)	650 Plymouth Ave. 41°42′08″N 71°09′23″W	Fall River	
33	Corky Row Historic District	Corky Row Historic District	June 23, 1983 (#83000656)	Roughly bounded by Plymouth Ave. I195 and 2nd St. 41°41′43″N 71°09′23″W	Fall River	Include Davol Mills & Tecumseh Mills
34	Cornell Mills	Cornell Mills	February 16, 1983 (#83000657)	Alden St. 41°41′03″N 71°08′01″W	Fall River	
35	Coughlin School	Coughlin School	February 16, 1983 (#83000658)	1975 Pleasant St. 41°41′04″N 71°07′42″W	Fall River	
36	Crescent Mill	Crescent Mill	February 16, 1983 (#83000659)	30 Front St. 41°41′51″N 71°08′49″W	Fall River	
37	Davol School	Davol School	February 16, 1983 (#83000661)	112 Flint St. 41°41′34″N 71°08′09″W	Fall River	school closed in June 2008, Now owned by the Flint Neighborhood Association
38	William C. Davol Jr. House	William C. Davol Jr. House	February 16, 1983 (#83004286)	252 High St. 41°42′50″N 71°09′10″W	Fall River	
39	Downtown Fall River Historic District	Downtown Fall River Historic District	February 16, 1983 (#83000662)	N. and S. Main, Bedford, Granite, Bank, Franklin, and Elm Sts. 41°42′11″N 71°09′21″W	Fall River	
40	Durfee Mills	Durfee Mills	February 16, 1983 (#83000664)	359–479 Pleasant St. 41°41′54″N 71°08′59″W	Fall River	largest mill complex in city
41	B.M.C. Durfee High School	B.M.C. Durfee High School	June 11, 1981 (#81000109)	289 Rock St. 41°42′20″N 71°09′08″W	Fall River	now occupied by Massachusetts Probate Court
42	Bradford Durfee Textile School	Bradford Durfee Textile School	February 20, 2024 (#100009976)	64 Durfee Street; 41°42′12″N 71°09′24″W	Fall River	
43	John M. Earle House	John M. Earle House	February 16, 1983 (#83000665)	352 Durfee St. 41°42′58″N 71°09′26″W	Fall River	
44	Fall River Bleachery	Fall River Bleachery	February 16, 1983 (#83000667)	Jefferson St. 41°40′19″N 71°08′44″W	Fall River	
45	Fall River Waterworks	Fall River Waterworks	December 7, 1981 (#81000714)	Bedford St. 41°42′07″N 71°07′09″W	Fall River	
46	First Baptist Church	First Baptist Church	February 16, 1983 (#83000668)	200–228 N. Main St. 41°42′18″N 71°09′20″W	Fall River	
47	Flint Mills	Flint Mills	February 16, 1983 (#83000669)	Alden St. 41°41′20″N 71°08′13″W	Fall River	
48	Foster Spinning Co.	Foster Spinning Co.	February 16, 1983 (#83000670)	Cove St. 41°43′27″N 71°08′49″W	Fall River	
49	Globe Yarn Mills	Globe Yarn Mills	February 16, 1983 (#83000671)	Globe St. 41°41′20″N 71°10′24″W	Fall River	
50	S. Gourse & Sons Block		December 5, 2022 (#100008429)	162-170 Pleasant St. 41°42′00″N 71°09′09″W	Fall River	
51	Greany Building	Greany Building	February 16, 1983 (#83000674)	1270–1288 Pleasant St. 41°41′31″N 71°08′10″W	Fall River	
52	Hargraves Mill No. 1	Hargraves Mill No. 1	February 16, 1983 (#83000675)	Quarry St. 41°41′33″N 71°08′25″W	Fall River	
53	James D. Hathaway House	James D. Hathaway House	February 16, 1983 (#83000676)	311 Pine St. 41°42′47″N 71°09′15″W	Fall River	
54	Highlands Historic District	Highlands Historic District	February 16, 1983 (#83000677)	Roughly bounded by June, Cherry, and Weetamae Sts., Lincoln, Highland, President, N. Main, and Hood Aves. 41°42′37″N 71°09′00″W	Fall River	
55	Home for Aged People		May 7, 2024 (#100010281)	1168 Highland Avenue; 41°43′15″N 71°08′24″W	Fall River	
56	House at 108–112 Quarry Street	House at 108–112 Quarry Street	February 16, 1983 (#83000683)	108–112 Quarry St. 41°42′23″N 71°08′26″W	Fall River	
57	Jesus Marie Convent	Jesus Marie Convent	February 16, 1983 (#83000685)	138 St. Joseph's St. 41°41′27″N 71°07′56″W	Fall River	
58	Kennedy Park	Kennedy Park	February 16, 1983 (#83000686)	Bounded by S. Main St., Bradford Ave., Middle, and Bay Sts. 41°41′44″N 71°10′12″W	Fall River	
59	King Philip Mills	King Philip Mills	February 16, 1983 (#83000687)	Kilburn St. 41°40′55″N 71°10′21″W	Fall River	Office building destroyed by fire, January 3, 2012
60	Lafayette-Durfee House	Lafayette-Durfee House	April 15, 1982 (#82004959)	94 Cherry St. 41°42′21″N 71°09′26″W	Fall River	
61	William Lindsey House	William Lindsey House	February 16, 1983 (#83000690)	373 N. Main St. 41°42′59″N 71°09′18″W	Fall River	
62	Lower Highlands Historic District	Lower Highlands Historic District	January 10, 1984 (#84002171)	Roughly bounded by Cherry, Main, Winter, and Bank Sts. 41°42′15″N 71°08′58″W	Fall River	
63	William M. Manley House	William M. Manley House	June 26, 1986 (#86001401)	610 Cherry St. 41°42′17″N 71°08′54″W	Fall River	
64	Massasoit Fire House No. 5	Massasoit Fire House No. 5	February 16, 1983 (#83000692)	83 Freedom St. 41°41′22″N 71°10′09″W	Fall River	
65	Mechanics Mill	Mechanics Mill	February 16, 1983 (#83000693)	1082 Davol St. 41°43′07″N 71°09′21″W	Fall River	
66	Narragansett Mills	Narragansett Mills	February 16, 1983 (#83000694)	1567 N. Main St. 41°43′18″N 71°08′39″W	Fall River	
67	North Burial Ground	North Burial Ground	February 16, 1983 (#83000695)	N. Main St. between Brightman and Cory Sts. 41°43′11″N 71°09′00″W	Fall River	
68	North Christian Congregational Church	North Christian Congregational Church	February 16, 1983 (#83000696)	3538 N. Main St. 41°44′39″N 71°07′40″W	Fall River	
69	Notre Dame School	Notre Dame School	February 16, 1983 (#83000697)	34 St. Joseph's St. 41°41′28″N 71°08′02″W	Fall River	school closed in June 2008
70	Oak Grove Cemetery	Oak Grove Cemetery	February 16, 1983 (#83000698)	765 Prospect St. 41°42′19″N 71°08′14″W	Fall River	
71	Osborn House	Osborn House	April 4, 1980 (#80000431)	456 Rock St. 41°42′27″N 71°09′09″W	Fall River	aka Carr-Osborn Mansion
72	Osborn Street School	Osborn Street School	February 16, 1983 (#83000699)	160 Osborn St. 41°41′33″N 71°10′03″W	Fall River	
73	Israel Picard House	Israel Picard House	February 16, 1983 (#83000702)	690 County St. 41°42′06″N 71°07′46″W	Fall River	
74	Pilgrim Mills	Pilgrim Mills	February 16, 1983 (#83000704)	847 Pleasant St. 41°41′56″N 71°09′05″W	Fall River	
75	Pine Street School	Pine Street School	February 16, 1983 (#83000705)	880 Pine St. 41°42′09″N 71°08′39″W	Fall River	
76	Pocasset Firehouse No. 7	Pocasset Firehouse No. 7	February 16, 1983 (#83000706)	1058 Pleasant St. 41°41′40″N 71°08′19″W	Fall River	
77	PT Boat 796 (torpedo boat)	PT Boat 796 (torpedo boat)	January 14, 1986 (#86000092)	Battleship Cove; 41°42′14″N 71°09′40″W	Fall River	
78	Quequechan Club	Quequechan Club	February 16, 1983 (#83000708)	306 N. Main St. 41°42′57″N 71°09′21″W	Fall River	
79	Quequechan Valley Mills Historic District	Quequechan Valley Mills Historic District	February 16, 1983 (#83000709)	Quequechan, Jefferson, and Stevens Sts. between I-195 and Denver St. 41°40′59″N 71°08′33″W	Fall River	
80	Nathan Read House	Nathan Read House	February 16, 1983 (#83000710)	506 N. Main St. 41°43′05″N 71°09′20″W	Fall River	
81	Ruggles Park	Ruggles Park	February 16, 1983 (#83000711)	Bounded by Seabury, Robeson, Pine, and Locust Sts. 41°42′14″N 71°08′46″W	Fall River	
82	Sacred Heart School	Sacred Heart School	March 9, 1987 (#87000371)	90 Linden St. 41°42′11″N 71°08′57″W	Fall River	
83	Sagamore Mill No. 2	Sagamore Mill No. 2	February 16, 1983 (#83000712)	1822 N. Main St. 41°43′26″N 71°08′39″W	Fall River	
84	Sagamore Mills No. 1 and No. 3	Sagamore Mills No. 1 and No. 3	February 16, 1983 (#83000713)	Ace St. 41°43′33″N 71°08′43″W	Fall River	
85	Sanford Spinning Co.	Sanford Spinning Co.	February 16, 1983 (#83000714)	Globe Mills Ave. 41°41′33″N 71°10′45″W	Fall River	NRHP listing includes Globe Yarn Mills No. 3
86	Santo Christo Church	Santo Christo Church	February 16, 1983 (#83000715)	240 Columbia St. 41°42′01″N 71°09′48″W	Fall River	
87	Seaconnett Mills	Seaconnett Mills	February 16, 1983 (#83000716)	E. Warren St. 41°41′00″N 71°08′10″W	Fall River	
88	John Mace Smith House	John Mace Smith House	February 16, 1983 (#83000717)	399 N. Main St. 41°42′57″N 71°09′18″W	Fall River	
89	St. Anne's Church and Parish Complex	St. Anne's Church and Parish Complex	February 16, 1983 (#83000719)	780 S. Main St. 41°41′38″N 71°09′50″W	Fall River	
90	St. Joseph's Church	St. Joseph's Church	February 16, 1983 (#83000720)	1355 N. Main St. 41°43′07″N 71°08′52″W	Fall River	
91	St. Joseph's Orphanage	St. Joseph's Orphanage	February 16, 1983 (#83000721)	56 St. Joseph's St. 41°41′30″N 71°08′00″W	Fall River	
92	St. Louis Church	St. Louis Church	February 16, 1983 (#83000722)	440 Bradford Ave. 41°41′47″N 71°10′02″W	Fall River	Demolished in April 2010
93	St. Mary's Cathedral and Rectory	St. Mary's Cathedral and Rectory	February 16, 1983 (#83000723)	327 Second St. 41°41′55″N 71°09′28″W	Fall River	
94	St. Patrick's Church	St. Patrick's Church	February 16, 1983 (#83000724)	1588 S. Main St. 41°41′08″N 71°10′25″W	Fall River	now known as Good Shepherd Parish
95	Stafford Mills	Stafford Mills	February 16, 1983 (#83000718)	County St. 41°41′46″N 71°08′21″W	Fall River	
96	Third Street Commercial Corridor Historic District		February 17, 2023 (#100008624)	18-48 3rd St. 41°42′05″N 71°09′13″W	Fall River	
97	Torpedo Boat PT-617	Torpedo Boat PT-617	December 20, 1989 (#89002465)	Battleship Cove; 41°42′14″N 71°09′40″W	Fall River	
98	Truesdale Hospital	Truesdale Hospital	April 15, 1986 (#86000801)	1820 Highland Ave. 41°43′41″N 71°08′07″W	Fall River	
99	U.S.S. Joseph P. Kennedy Jr. (DD-850)	U.S.S. Joseph P. Kennedy Jr. (DD-850)	September 30, 1976 (#76000231)	Battleship Cove; 41°42′21″N 71°09′47″W	Fall River	
100	U.S.S. Lionfish	U.S.S. Lionfish	September 30, 1976 (#76000232)	Battleship Cove; 41°42′20″N 71°09′48″W	Fall River	
101	U.S.S. Massachusetts	U.S.S. Massachusetts	September 30, 1976 (#76002269)	Battleship Cove; 41°42′24″N 71°09′48″W	Fall River	
102	Union Belt Company Factory		February 6, 2026 (#100012700)	66 Troy Street; 41°42′02″N 71°09′10″W	Fall River	
103	Union Mills	Union Mills	February 16, 1983 (#83000726)	Pleasant St. 41°41′44″N 71°08′32″W	Fall River	
104	The Unitarian Society	The Unitarian Society	May 13, 1982 (#82004958)	309 N. Main St. 41°42′22″N 71°09′17″W	Fall River	Destroyed by fire in 1983; rebuilt.
105	Valentine-French House	Valentine-French House	February 16, 1983 (#83000727)	5105 N. Main St. 41°45′36″N 71°06′45″W	Fall River	
106	Wampanoag Mills	Wampanoag Mills	February 16, 1983 (#83000729)	Quequechan St. 41°41′20″N 71°08′19″W	Fall River	
107	Woman's Club of Fall River	Woman's Club of Fall River	February 16, 1983 (#83000733)	1542 Walnut St. 41°42′56″N 71°08′59″W	Fall River	
108	Luther Winslow Jr. House	Luther Winslow Jr. House	February 16, 1983 (#83000732)	5225 N. Main St. 41°45′37″N 71°06′42″W	Fall River	
109	Wyoming Mills	Wyoming Mills	April 30, 2024 (#83004613)	110 Chace St. 41°41′20″N 71°10′24″W	Fall River	

== See also ==
- National Register of Historic Places listings in Bristol County, Massachusetts
- List of National Historic Landmarks in Massachusetts
