= Third Street Commercial Corridor Historic District =

Historic district in Massachusetts, United States

- U.S. National Register of Historic Places
- U.S. Historic district
- Location within Massachusetts Location within the United States
- Location: 18-48 Third St. (even numbers), Fall River, Massachusetts
- Coordinates: 41°42′5″N 71°9′13″W
- Area: less than one acre
- Built: 1910
- Architectural style: Classical Revival
- NRHP reference No.: 100008624
- Added to NRHP: February 17, 2023

The Third Street Commercial Corridor Historic District is a historic district on Third Street in Fall River, Massachusetts. It encompasses a pair of early 20th-century commercial buildings that have survived subsequent urban renewal projects in the city's downtown area. The district was added to the National Register of Historic Places in 2023. Both buildings have been converted to residential use.

== Description and history ==
The Third Street Commercial Corridor Historic District consists of a pair of early 20th-century buildings located on the east side of Third Street south of Bedford Street, just east of Fall River's city hall and across the street from the central post office. The southern building, known alternatively as the List Building or ILGWU Headquarters Building, is a two-story masonry structure, its main facade faced in buff-colored brick with neo-Classical architectural details. The northern building, known as the Allen, Slade Headquarters Building, is a four-story red brick structure, set on a rusticated stone foundation. It has more restrained neo-Classical features.

The Allen, Slade Building was built in 1910 for Allen, Slade & Company, a major wholesale dry goods and grocery retailer in the city for more than fifty years. The company occupied the building until 1939, using the building for its headquarters, and as a successful specialty clothing storage facility on its lower levels. Following the company's departure, the building housed a variety of commercial, retail, and professional tenants. It was converted to residential use in 2019–21. The ILGWU Headquarters building was built in 1930 for the List brothers, who operated an auto parts store on the premises and leased some of the space out to other commercial tenants. The local chapter of the International Ladies Garment Workers Union (ILGWU) purchased the building in 1951, converting it to house its headquarters and a women's health center. The health center closed in 1978, and the union moved out in 1995, and sold the property to a real estate developer in 2003. It was converted to residential use in 2022–23.

== See also ==
- National Register of Historic Places listings in Fall River, Massachusetts
