= William M. Manley House =

Historic house in Massachusetts, United States

- U.S. National Register of Historic Places
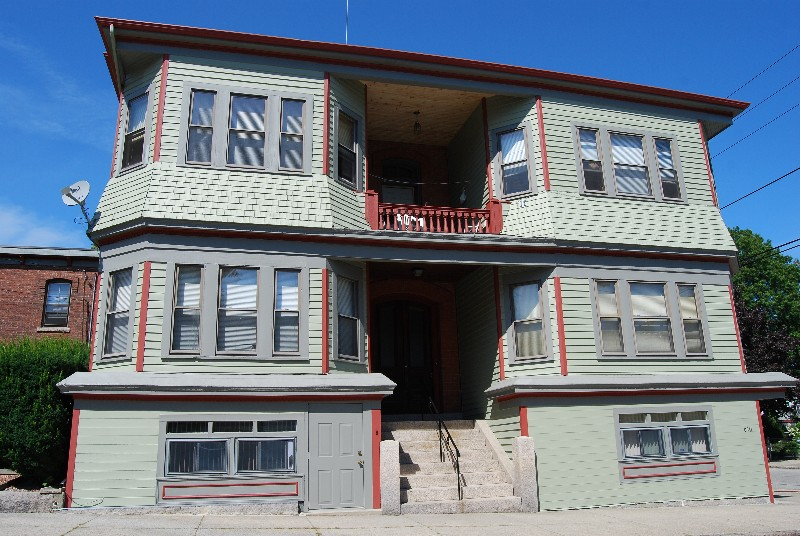

- Location within Massachusetts
- Location: 610 Cherry Street, Fall River, Massachusetts
- Coordinates: 41°42′17″N 71°8′54″W
- Built: 1876
- Architectural style: Italianate
- MPS: Fall River MRA
- NRHP reference No.: 86001401
- Added to NRHP: June 26, 1986

The William M. Manley House is a historic house located in Fall River, Massachusetts. The brick house was built in 1876. The double-bay wooden storefronts / porches were added around 1894 and expanded in 1916.

The house is an unusual Italianate brick villa with a matching carriage house. William Manley, a mason and builder had his office and house located here in 1876. He sold the property to the Taunton Brick Co. who held the property until 1887 when they sold it to the Second Baptist Society of Fall River. They used it as a parsonage until 1909. The house was added to the National Register of Historic Places in 1986.

== See also ==
- National Register of Historic Places listings in Fall River, Massachusetts
