= Nathan Read House =

Historic house in Massachusetts, United States

- U.S. National Register of Historic Places
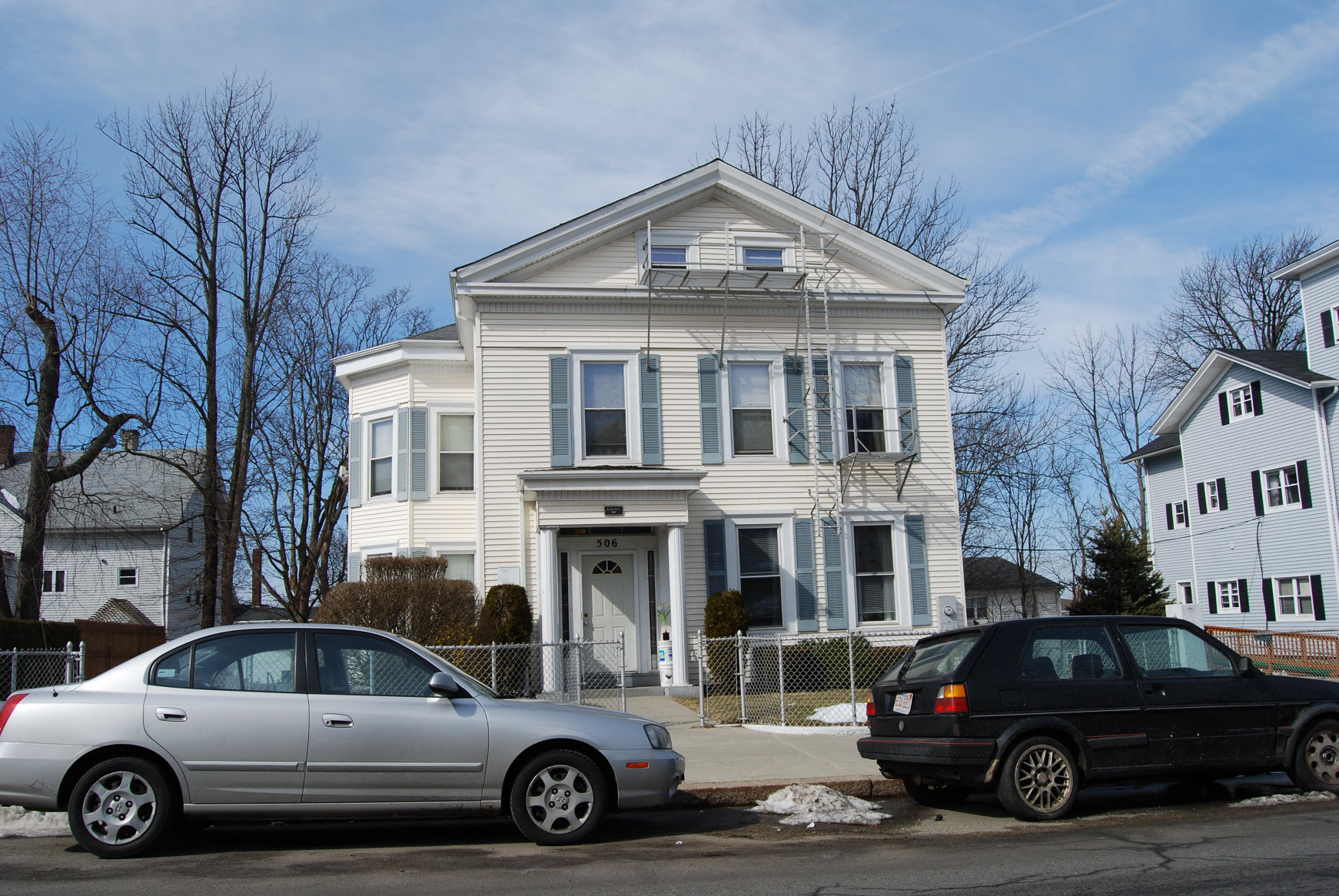
- 506 North Main Street

- Location within Massachusetts Location within the United States
- Location: 506 N. Main St., Fall River, Massachusetts
- Coordinates: 41°42′32″N 71°9′17″W
- Built: 1845
- Architectural style: Greek Revival
- MPS: Fall River MRA
- NRHP reference No.: 83000710
- Added to NRHP: February 16, 1983

The Nathan Read House is a historic house located at 506 North Main Street in Fall River, Massachusetts.

== Description and history ==
The house was built in 1845 by Nathan Read, owner of Nathan Read & Co., a retailer selling outerwear. It is part of a cluster Greek Revival houses built on North Main Street after the Great 1843 fire that destroyed much of downtown Fall River. Although it does not have the Greek temple front of some, it has a three-bay wide facade with fully pedimented gable, paneled corner pilasters, and an entrance portico supported by Ionic columns.

The house was added to the National Register of Historic Places on February 16, 1983.

== See also ==
- National Register of Historic Places listings in Fall River, Massachusetts
