= Sagamore Mill No. 2 =

- U.S. National Register of Historic Places
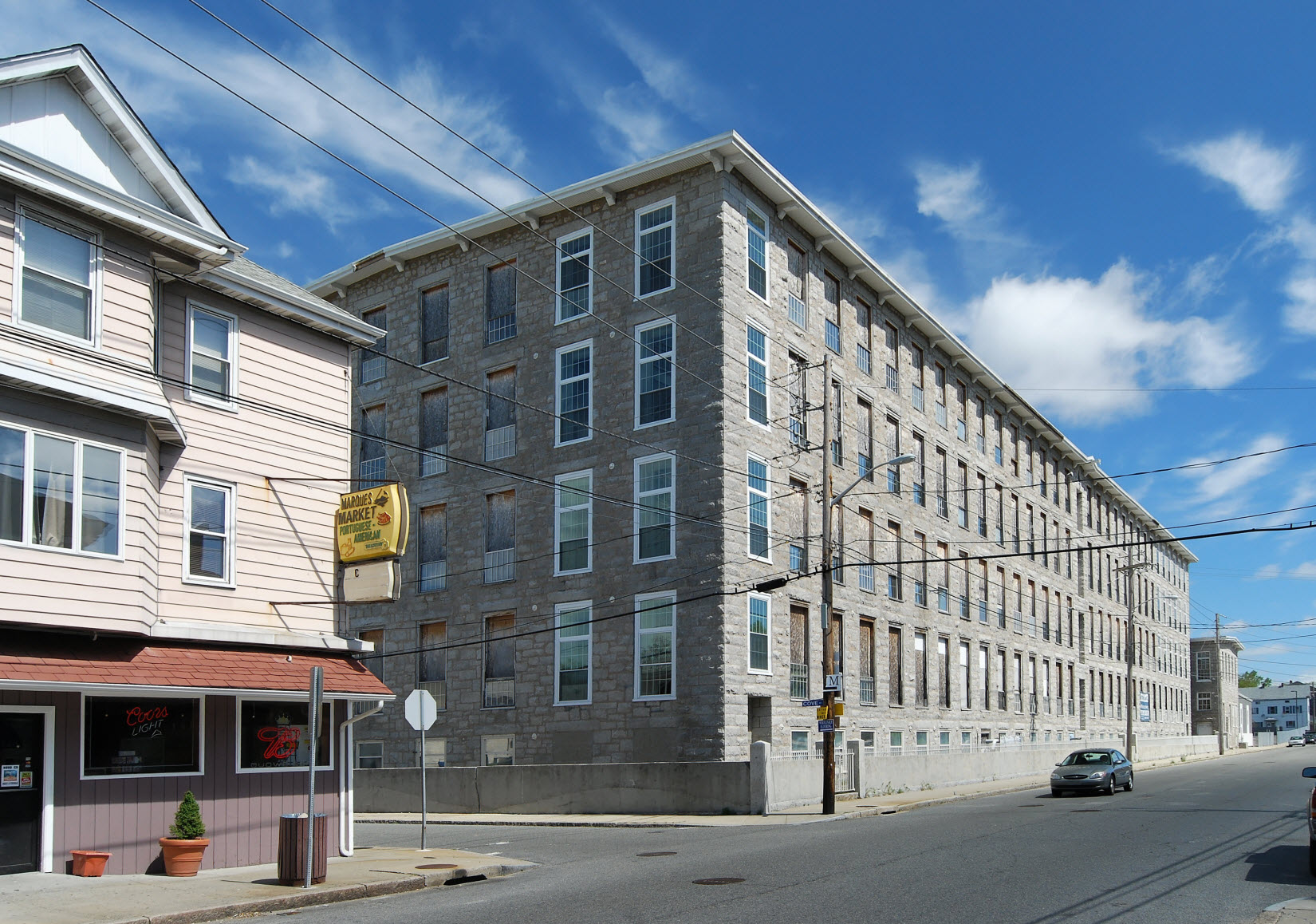

- Location within Massachusetts Location within the United States
- Location: 1822 N. Main St., Fall River, Massachusetts
- Coordinates: 41°43′26″N 71°8′39″W
- Area: 4.1 acres (1.7 ha)
- Built: 1881
- Architect: D. H. Dyer
- MPS: Fall River MRA
- NRHP reference No.: 83000712
- Added to NRHP: February 16, 1983

Sagamore Mill No. 2 is an historic textile mill located at 1822 N. Main Street in Fall River, Massachusetts. Built in 1881, it is the oldest surviving mill of three built by the Sagamore Mill Company, one of Fall River's largest textile operations. The mill complex was added to the National Register of Historic Places in 1983.

== Description ==
Sagamore Mill No. 2 is located in northern Fall River, on the west side of North Main Street at its junction with Cove Street. The complex consists of a large main mill building and a number of smaller, all built out of granite quarried in nearby Assonet. The main mill is 300 feet (91 m) long and 90 feet (27 m) wide, and is covered by a shallow-pitch gable roof with bracketed cornice. Its exterior, and that of the ancillary buildings, is rusticated granite without significant further style. Attached to the west side of the mill near the center of the long facade are a series of secondary buildings, including boiler and engine houses, a picker house, and a waste house. Near its southern end is a single-story card house. Detached from the mill and just to its north is the two-story office building.

== History ==
The Sagamore Mills company was established in 1872 with Louis L. Barnard as the first president. The company failed in 1879, and was reorganized as Sagamore Manufacturing Company. Its first mill was built in 1872, and was replaced by the present brick Mill No. 1 building in 1888 after the first burned down in 1884. Mill No. 2 was constructed in 1881. It is one of the few mills located "below the hill" in Fall River that were constructed of granite rather than red brick, owing to the use of granite from Assonet rather than the more southerly Fall River quarries. The Sagamore Mills continued in operation into the 1960s, when the buildings were sold to other interests.

The Number 2 mill was later occupied by Joan Fabrics (later known as Main Street Textiles) until 2001, when it opened a huge new plant in the city's industrial park. (This plant closed a few years later).

== See also ==
- National Register of Historic Places listings in Fall River, Massachusetts
- List of mills in Fall River, Massachusetts
- Sagamore Mills No. 1 and No. 3
