= Barnabus Blossom House =

Historic house in Massachusetts, United States

- U.S. National Register of Historic Places
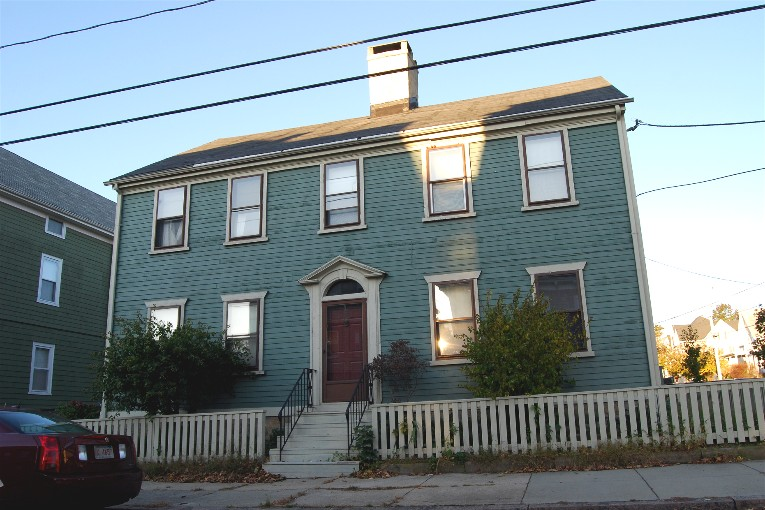

- Location within Massachusetts
- Location: 244 Grove St., Fall River, Massachusetts
- Coordinates: 41°42′23″N 71°8′55″W
- Built: c. 1800
- Architectural style: Federal
- MPS: Fall River MRA
- NRHP reference No.: 83000627
- Added to NRHP: February 16, 1983

The Barnabus Blossom House is a historic house located at 244 Grove Street in Fall River, Massachusetts. Built in about 1800, it is one of the city's oldest surviving buildings, and significant local example of Federal architecture.

== Description and history ==
The Barnabus Blossom House stands in a densely built residential area north of downtown Fall River, at the southwest corner of Grove and Walnut Streets. It is a 2 1/2-story, wood-framed structure, five bays wide, with a side gable roof, clapboard siding, and a central chimney. Its central entrance is set in a round-topped opening, with fanlight above the door. It is framed by pilasters rising to a pediment broken by the rounded opening. The upper-level windows butt against the eave in a typical Federal style. The interior retains original finishes, including beaded door mouldings, simple fireplace mantels, a beehive oven in the chimney, and a corner dining room cupboard.

The house's exact construction date is not known. During restoration, a penny dated 1800 was found inside one of its walls. It was originally located on North Main Street, an area that was historically lined with houses of this period, but gradually cleared of them by demolition or movement as the downtown expanded. It was moved to its current location in the 1880s to make way for the Hotel Mellen. It is considered one of the city's best preserved homes from the early Federal period.

It was listed on the National Register of Historic Places on February 16, 1983.

== See also ==
- National Register of Historic Places listings in Fall River, Massachusetts
