= Children's Home =

- U.S. National Register of Historic Places
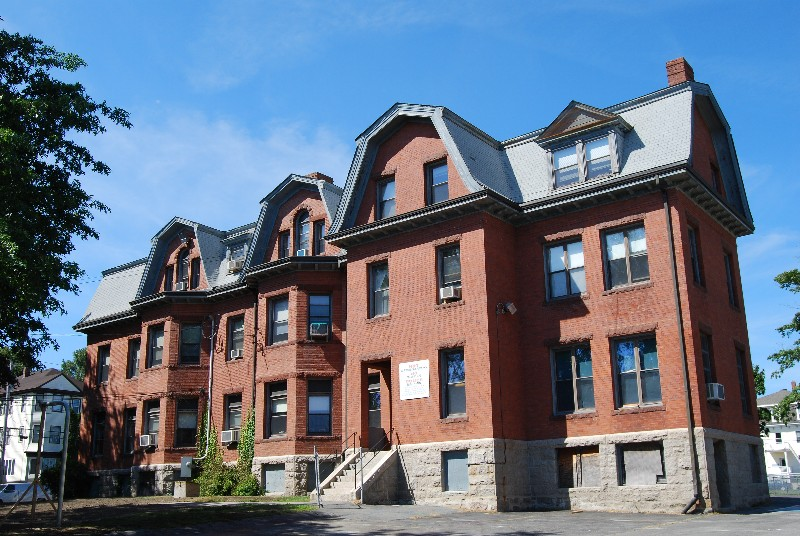

- Location within Massachusetts Location within the United States
- Location: Fall River, Massachusetts
- Coordinates: 41°42′53″N 71°8′39″W
- Built: 1894
- Architectural style: Colonial Revival
- MPS: Fall River MRA
- NRHP reference No.: 83000652
- Added to NRHP: February 16, 1983

Children's Home is a historic building at 427 Robeson Street in Fall River, Massachusetts. It was built in 1895 to replace an earlier wooden building. The Children's Home was founded in 1873 as a merger of the Fall River Orphan's Asylum and Children's Friend Society. It is an architecturally eclectic brick building, with asymmetrical massing and a complicated roof line typical of the Queen Anne Revival, but also with Colonial Revival features including its columned porch and bracketed cornice. The building was added to the National Register of Historic Places in 1983. The listing included a small stick-style picnic shelter also located on the property.

It is now owned by Citizens for Citizens, Inc.

== See also ==
- National Register of Historic Places listings in Fall River, Massachusetts
