= Borden–Winslow House =

Historic house in Massachusetts, United States

- U.S. National Register of Historic Places
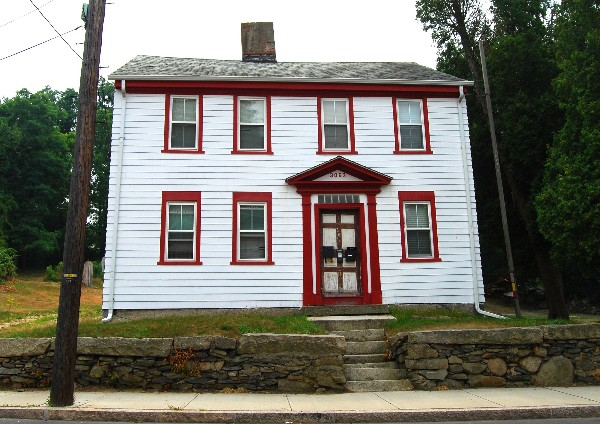

- Location within Massachusetts Location within the United States
- Location: Fall River, Massachusetts
- Coordinates: 41°43′34″N 71°8′2″W
- Built: 1740
- Architectural style: Georgian
- MPS: Fall River MRA
- NRHP reference No.: 83000632
- Added to NRHP: February 16, 1983

The Borden–Winslow House is a historic house located at 3063 North Main Street in Fall River, Massachusetts. It was built c. 1740 in the Steep Brook area, then still part of Freetown, making it possibly the oldest extant house in Fall River. Of particular interest is the fine Georgian pediment doorway, which includes a six-light transom within its entablature. The survival of this doorway makes the house unusually important.

It is one of six houses in the Steep Brook area considered to be the best representatives of the pre-industrial period of the city's history, and was added to the National Register of Historic Places in 1983.

== See also ==
- National Register of Historic Places listings in Fall River, Massachusetts
- List of historic houses in Massachusetts
