= Luther Winslow Jr. House =

Historic house in Massachusetts, United States

- U.S. National Register of Historic Places
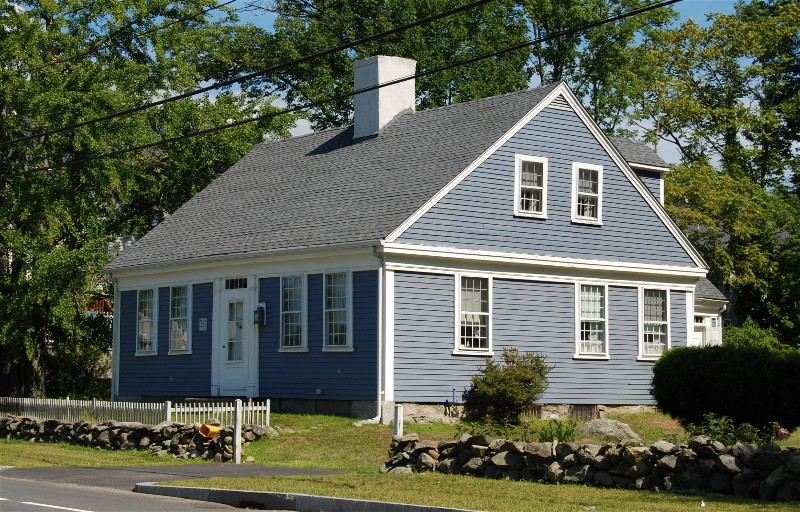
- 5225 North Main Street

- Location within Massachusetts Location within the United States
- Location: 5225 N. Main St., Fall River, Massachusetts
- Coordinates: 41°45′7″N 71°6′31″W
- Built: 1795
- Architectural style: Federal
- MPS: Fall River MRA
- NRHP reference No.: 83000732
- Added to NRHP: February 16, 1983

The Luther Winslow Jr. House is a historic house located at 5225 North Main Street in Fall River, Massachusetts.

== Description and history ==
Built in 1795, the 1 1/2-story farmhouse is a fine example of 18th century vernacular architecture which has remained remarkably intact. Typical features include the 5-bay wide plan, large central chimney, clapboard sheathing, pilasters framing the center door, transom lights, 12/12 sash, corner boards and wide entablature. It is one of six houses in the Steep Brook area considered to be the best representatives of the pre-industrial period of the city's history.

It was added to the National Register of Historic Places on February 16, 1983.

== See also ==
- National Register of Historic Places listings in Fall River, Massachusetts
