= Downtown Fall River Historic District =

Historic district in Massachusetts, United States

- U.S. National Register of Historic Places
- U.S. Historic district
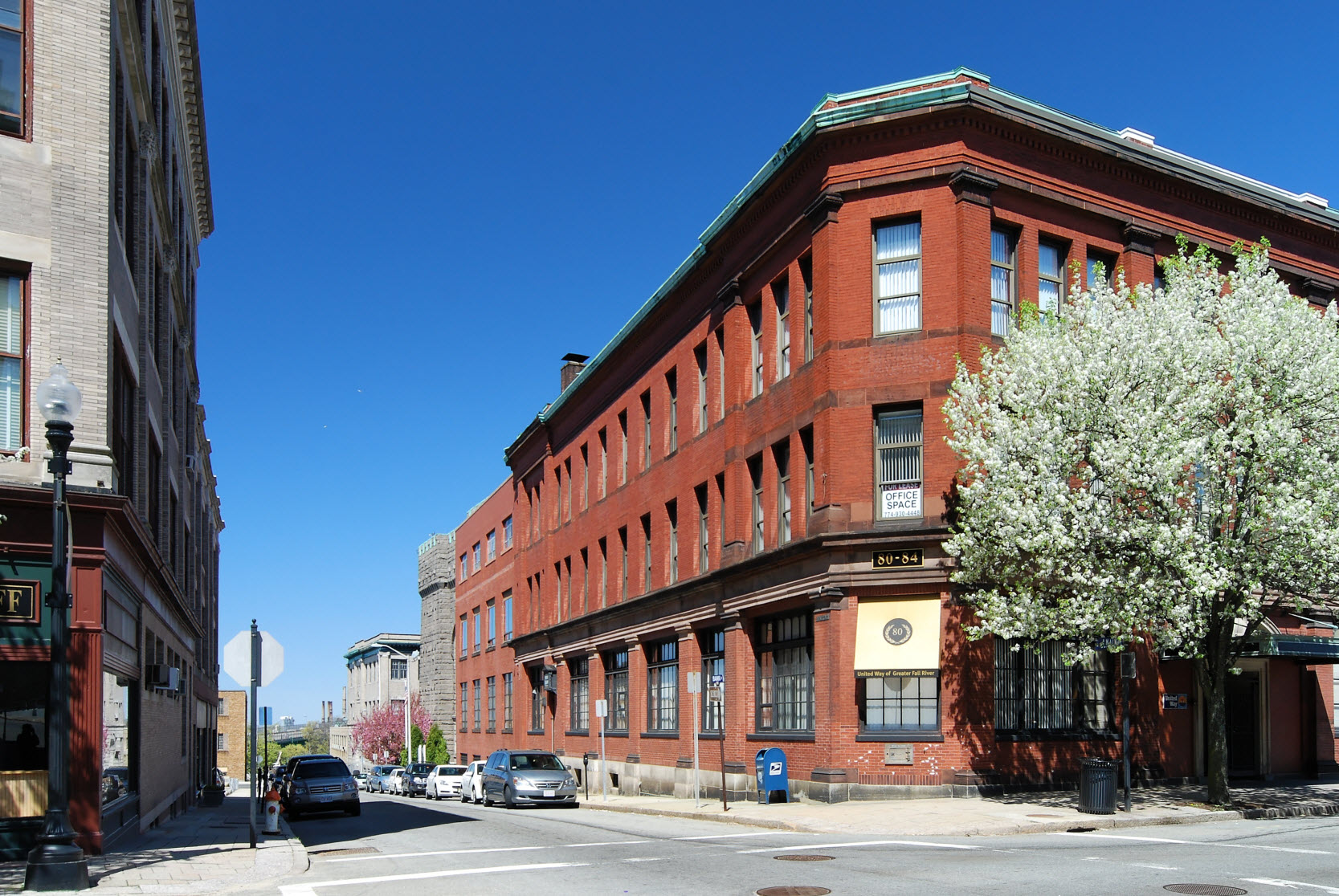
- Bank Street, Downtown Fall River

- Location within Massachusetts Location within the United States
- Location: Fall River, Massachusetts
- Coordinates: 41°42′11″N 71°9′21″W
- Built: 1845; 181 years ago
- Architectural style: Late 19th And 20th Century Revivals, Late Victorian
- MPS: Fall River MRA
- NRHP reference No.: 83000662
- Added to NRHP: February 16, 1983

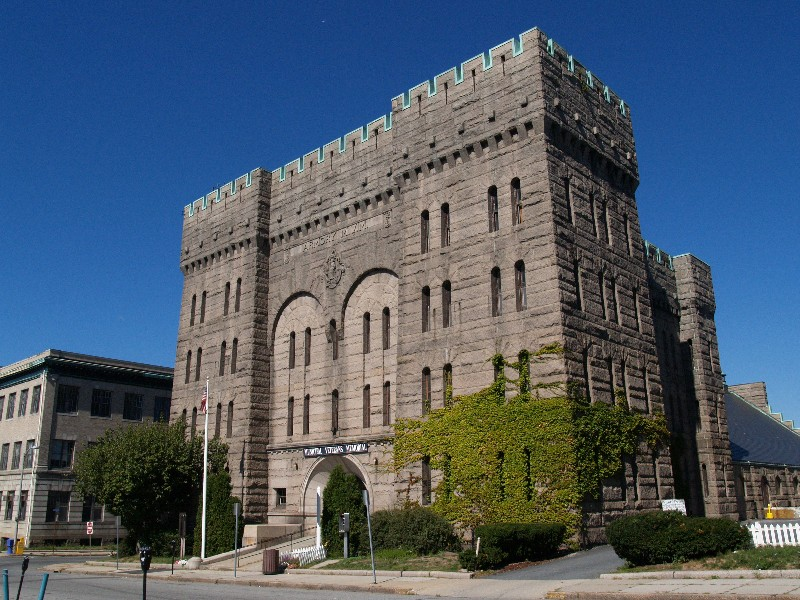
Bank Street Armory

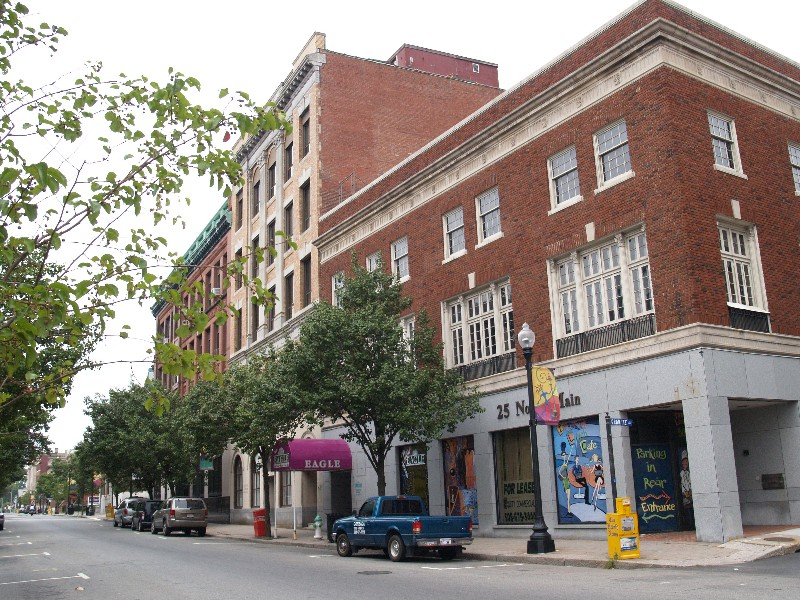
North Main Street

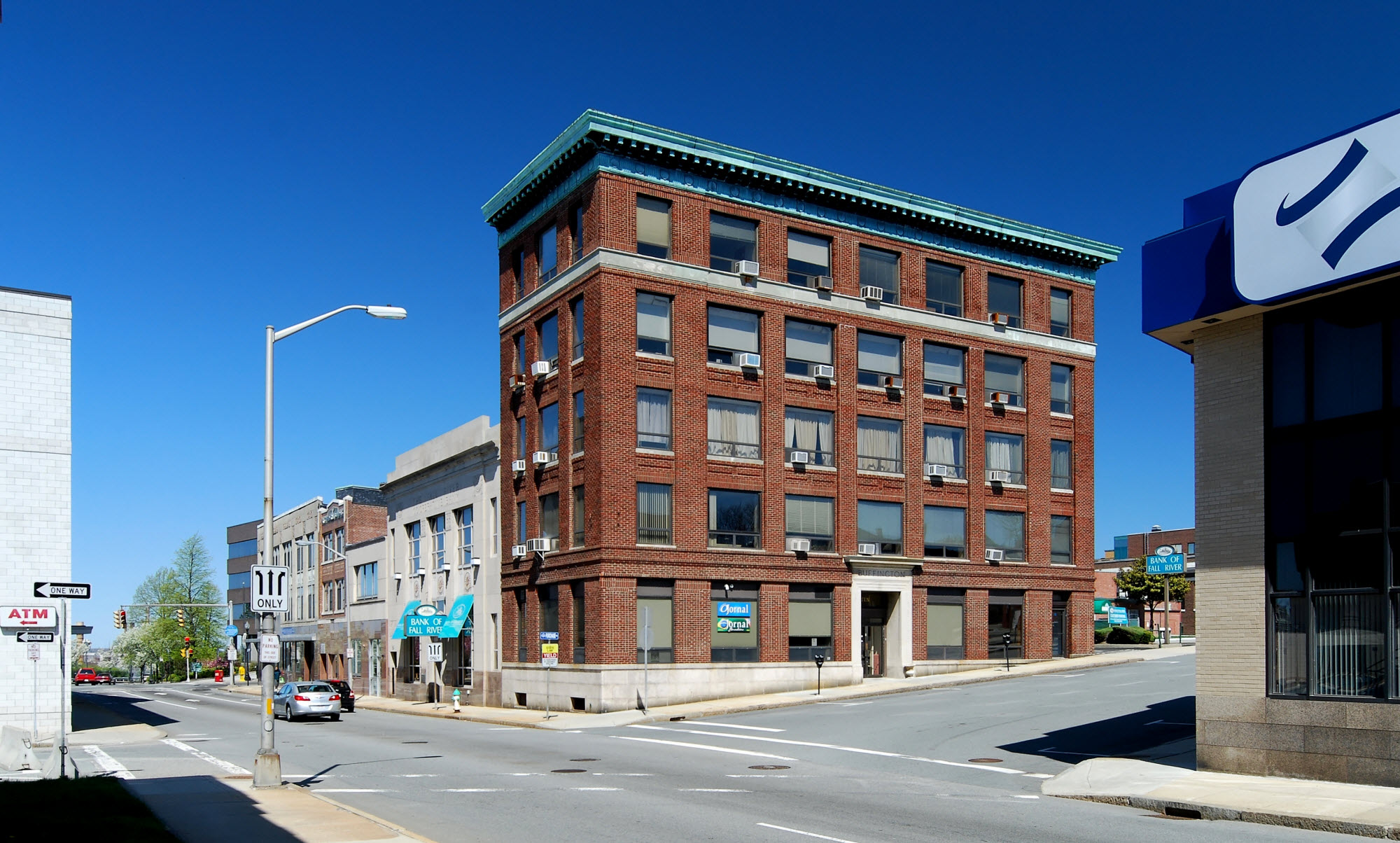
Bedford Street

Downtown Fall River Historic District is a historic district on North and South Main, Bedford, Granite, Bank, Franklin, and Elm Streets in Fall River, Massachusetts.

The district was added to the National Register of Historic Places in 1983.

== History ==
The Downtown Fall River Historic District contains many historic banks and other commercial properties primarily along North Main Street. This area was greatly impacted by the Great Fire of 1928, which destroyed many buildings located in what is now the historic district. As a result, many of the buildings date from about 1928 or 1929, having been rebuilt shortly after the fire. The area was also greatly impacted in the 1960s with the construction of Interstate-195 through the center of downtown, which resulted in the demolition of the Old City Hall, the Second Granite Block and several other 19th century commercial blocks.

== Contributing properties ==
(partial listing)

- United States Post Office, Bedford Street
- State Armory, Bank Street
- Public Library, North Main Street
- Bank Five (formerly Fall River Five Cents Savings Bank), North Main Street
- Masonic Temple, North Main Street
- Police Athletic League Hall, Franklin Street

== See also ==
- National Register of Historic Places listings in Fall River, Massachusetts
