= Squire William B. Canedy House =

Historic house in Massachusetts, United States

- U.S. National Register of Historic Places
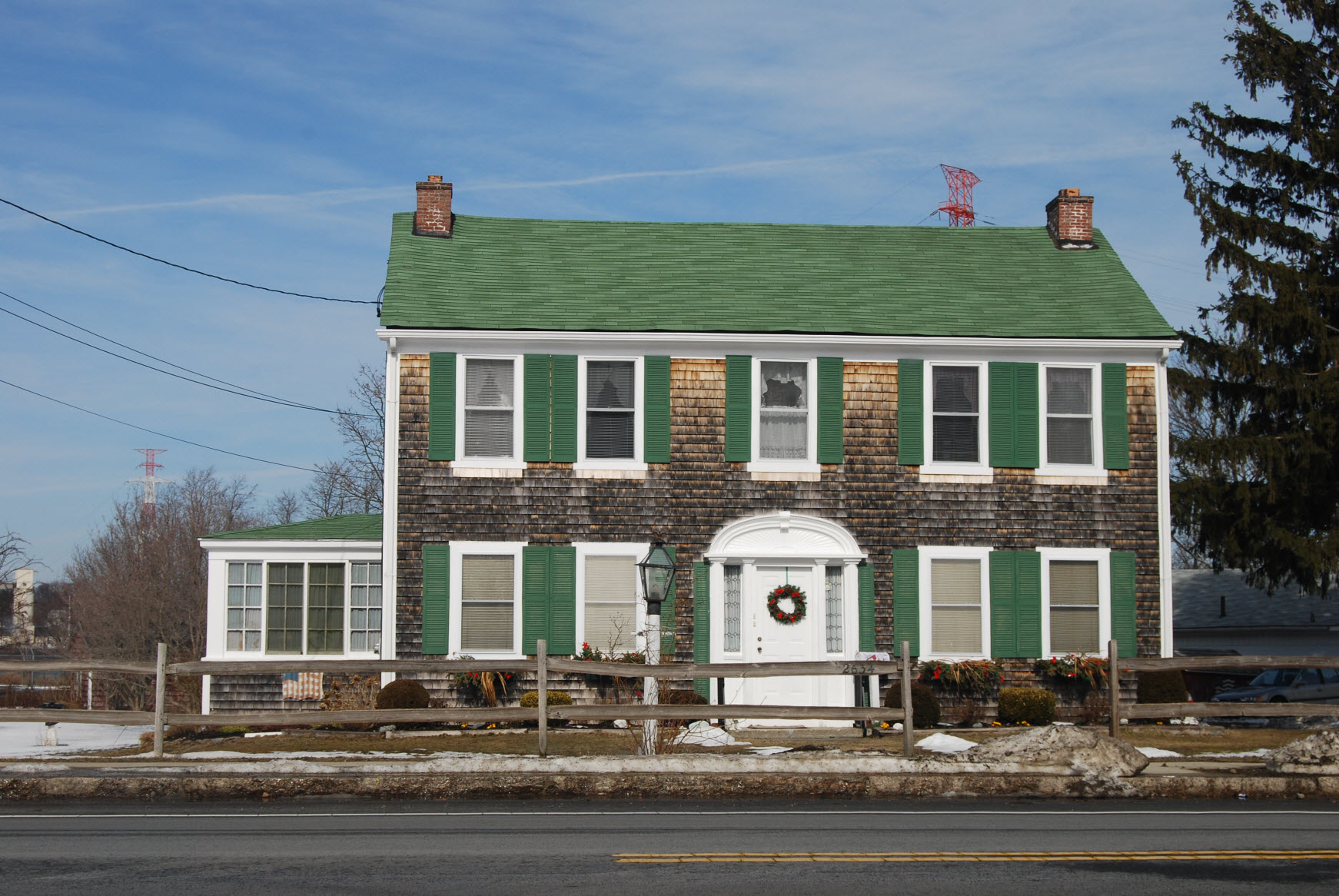

- Location within Massachusetts Location within the United States
- Location: Fall River, Massachusetts
- Coordinates: 41°42′52″N 71°8′10″W
- Built: 1806
- Architectural style: Federal
- MPS: Fall River MRA
- NRHP reference No.: 83000640
- Added to NRHP: February 16, 1983

The Squire William B. Canedy House is a historic house at 2634 N. Main Street in Fall River, Massachusetts. It is a 2 1/2-story wood-frame structure, five bays wide, with a side-gable roof, twin end chimneys, and wooden shingle siding. The center entrance is flanked by sidelight windows and pilasters, and is topped by a semi-elliptical solid fan. The house was built in 1806 and added to the National Register of Historic Places in 1983. The house is one of six in the Steep Brook section of Fall River considered to best represent the pre-industrial period of the city's history.

== See also ==
- National Register of Historic Places listings in Fall River, Massachusetts
