= Barnard Mills =

- U.S. National Register of Historic Places
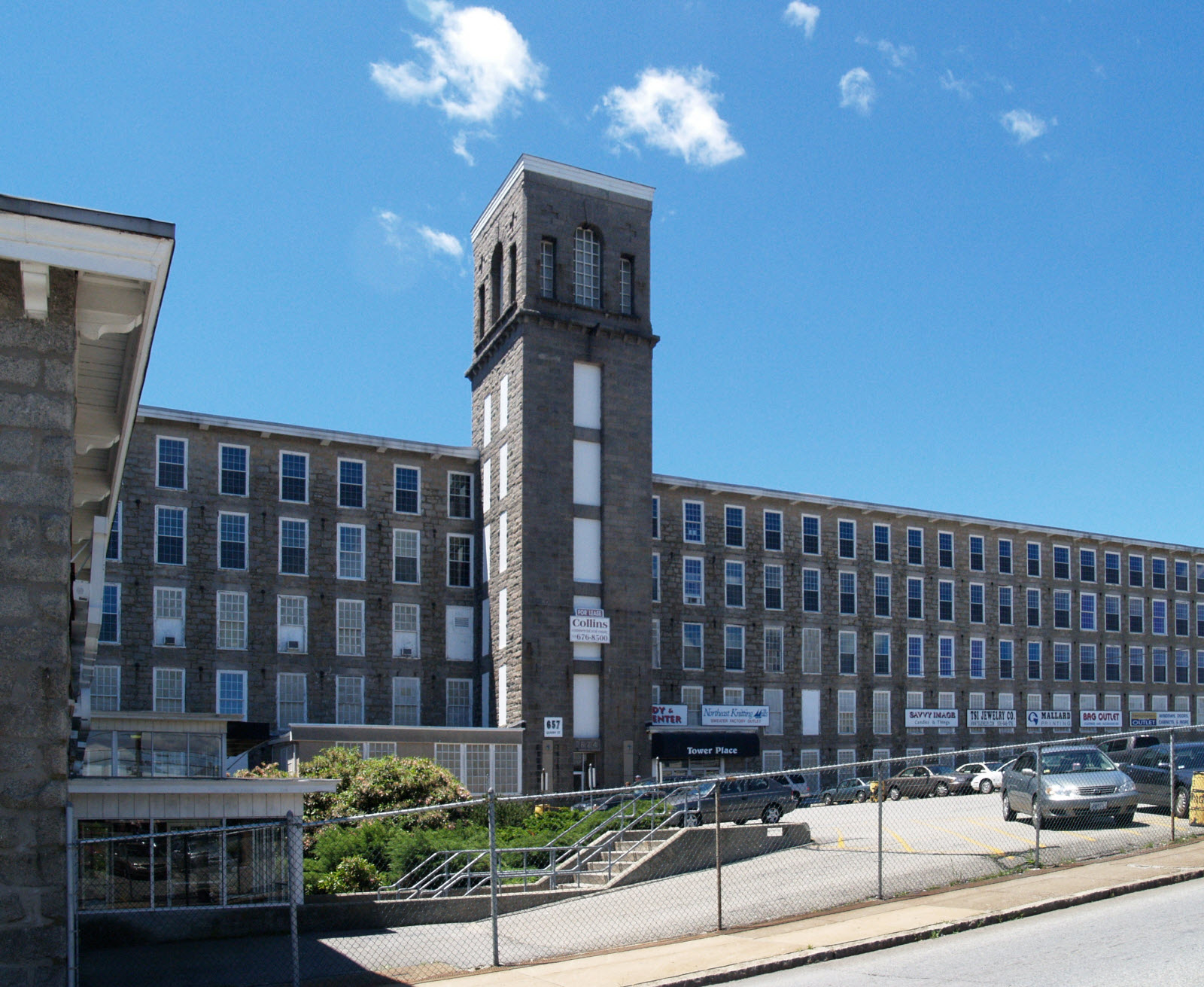

- Location within Massachusetts Location within the United States
- Location: 641–657 Quarry St., Fall River, Massachusetts
- Coordinates: 41°41′26″N 71°8′26″W
- Built: 1874
- Architect: Walter C. Huston
- MPS: Fall River MRA
- NRHP reference No.: 83000623
- Added to NRHP: February 16, 1983

Barnard Mills is an historic textile mill at 641-657 Quarry Street in Fall River, Massachusetts. Developed beginning in 1874, it was the first mill to use ring spinners instead of mule spinners, and was a major local employer until its closure in 1939. The complex has been redeveloped as a commercial retail space called Tower Mill. The mill was added to the National Register of Historic Places in 1983.

== Description and history ==
The Barnard Mills complex occupies a highly visible location, set between Quarry Street and the Quequechan River, just northwest of Interstate 195 at its western junction with Massachusetts Route 24. The main building is a five-story granite structure, 280 feet (85 m) long and 74 feet (23 m) wide, with a tall centrally positioned Italianate tower. Attached to the southern corner of the main building is a two-story granite weave shed.

The mill corporation was organized in 1872, but the mill was not built until 1874. It was constructed in native Fall River granite for the manufacture of cotton cloth during the city's post-Civil War textile building boom. It had an initial capacity of 28,000 spindles, which was later increased to 66,000 spindles with the construction of the attached weave shed in 1896. L.I. Barnard served as the first president of the company, and N.B. Borden was treasurer. It was the city's first mill to print cloth wider than 28 inches (71 cm). In its later years, it diversified into the production of tweeds and twills. The company was liquidated in 1939.

During the 1980s the mill was converted into a retail outlet center, known as Tower Place. It is now known as Tower Mill, housing a variety of commercial and retail enterprises.

== See also ==
- National Register of Historic Places listings in Fall River, Massachusetts
- List of mills in Fall River, Massachusetts
