= Flint Mills =

- U.S. National Register of Historic Places
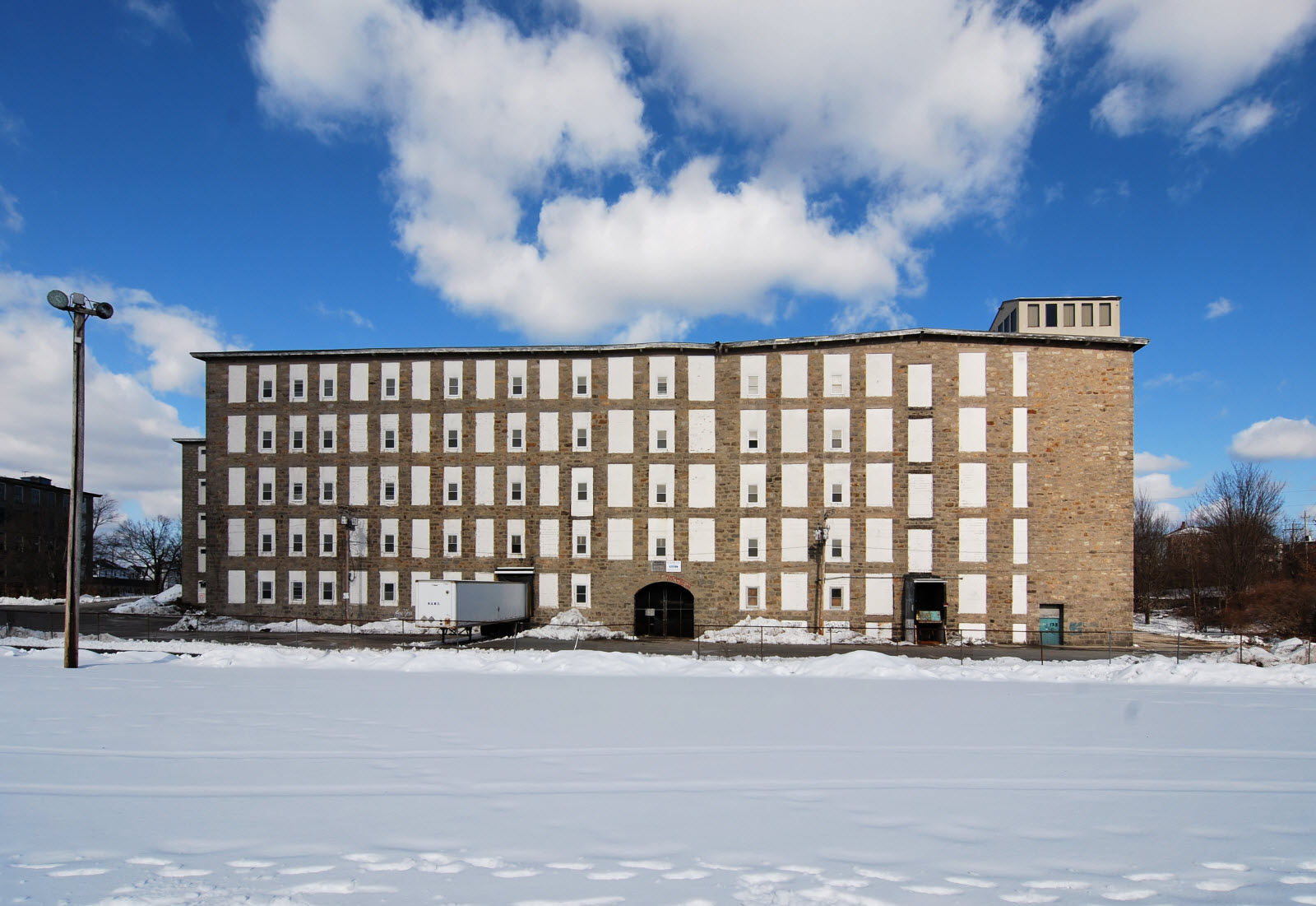
- Flint Mill #2 on right, with connector mill on left.

- Location within Massachusetts Location within the United States
- Location: Fall River, Massachusetts
- Coordinates: 41°41′20″N 71°8′13″W
- Built: 1883
- MPS: Fall River MRA
- NRHP reference No.: 83000669
- Added to NRHP: February 16, 1983

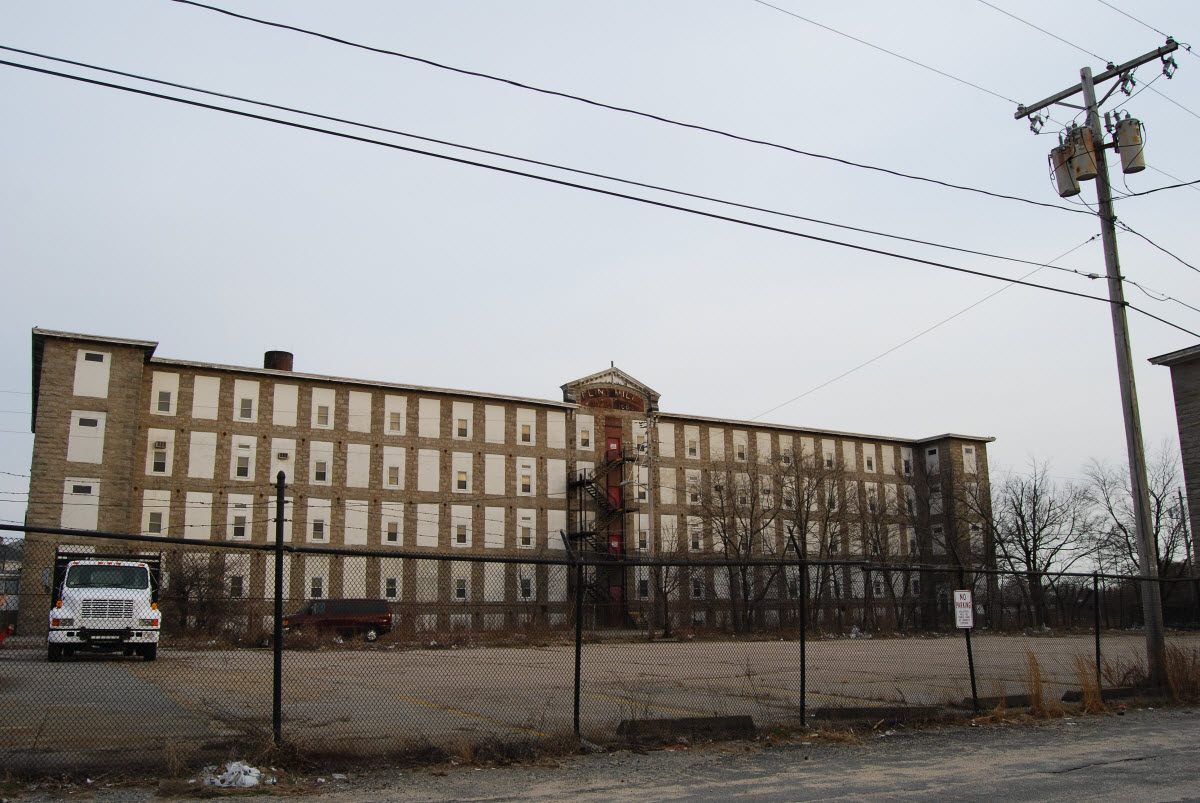
Flint Mill #1

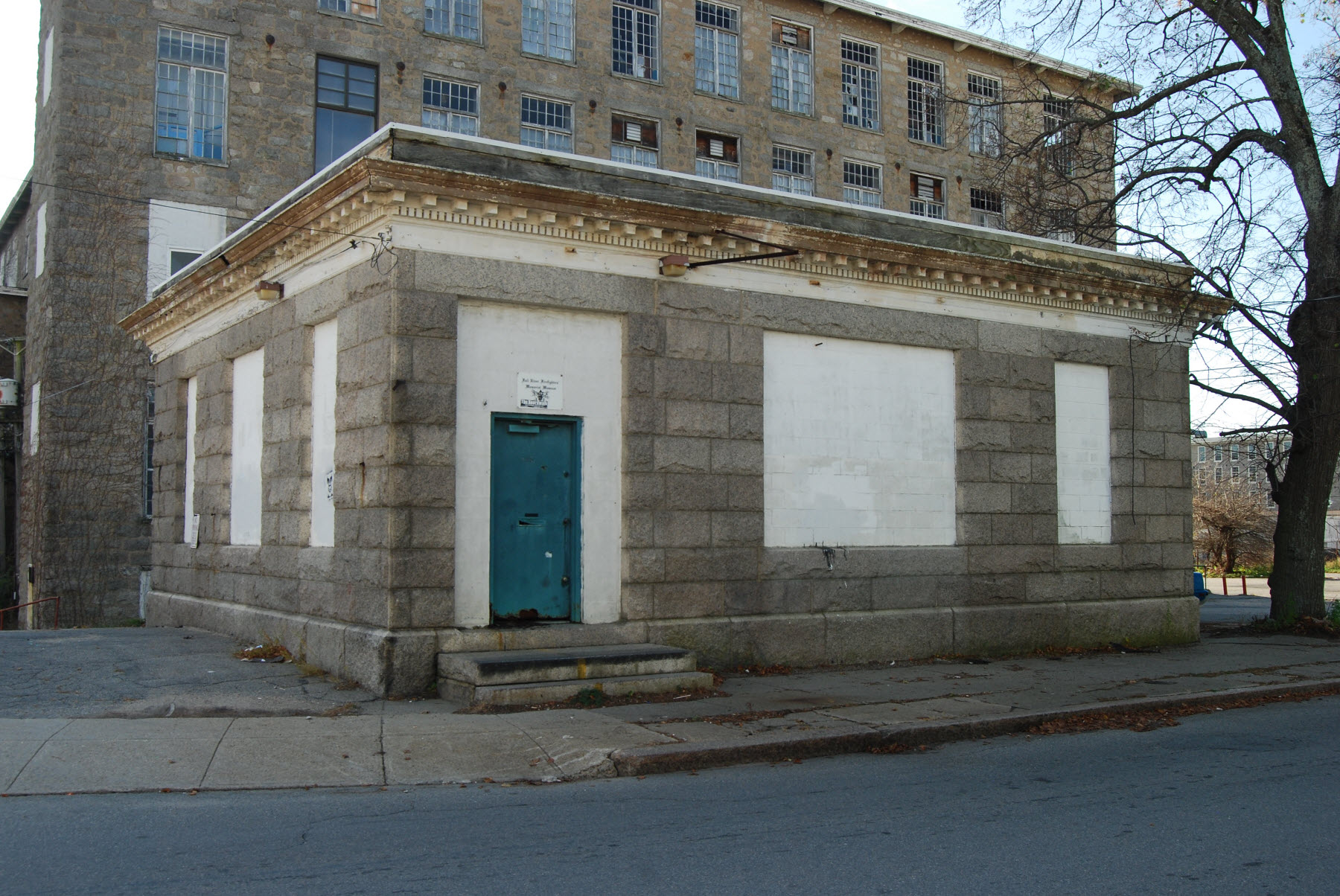
Flint Mills office

Flint Mills is a historic textile mill complex located on Alden Street in Fall River, Massachusetts, near the banks of the Quequechan River. The company was founded in 1872 and named in honor of John D. Flint, who served as its first president. The original 1872 mill burned in 1882, and was rebuilt in 1883. The complex was later expanded with a second mill and large addition in 1909. The site also contains a detached granite mill office building. The section of Fall River surrounding the mill became known as "Flint Village". The site was added to the National Register of Historic Places in 1983.

== History ==
The mills were incorporated on February 28, 1872 during a time of remarkable growth within the City of Fall River. Initial working capital was set at $500,000, put in by about 200 shareholders. John D. Flint served as the first president of the company. Some of the other founders include Samuel C. Wrightington, Simeon Borden and William H. Jennings. The original 1872 mill, designed by D.H. Dyer, was built from native Fall River granite. It measured 300 feet long by 94 feet wide, with five stories and an ornate mansard tower. It was an unusually wide mill for its time, as most other mills in the city were about 72 or 74 feet in width. The new mill was fitted with 45,360 spindles and 1,008 looms for the production of print cloths, and employed about 500 people. Power was supplied by a 650-horsepower double Corliss engine fed by 5 upright boilers of 170 horsepower each. Water for the steam system was drawn from a canal dug to the nearby Quequechan River.

The company also purchased about 62 acres of land surrounding the mill, which at that time, was still largely farmland. The section of Fall River surrounding the mill became known as "Flint Village".

On October 28, 1882 it was destroyed by a massive fire that began in the engine room. Mill #1 was rebuilt in 1883, although without the original ornate tower. A second mill was later added to the east in 1909, and a large addition was made connecting the two mills. By 1911, the capital of the Flint Mills had increased to $1,160,000 with a capacity of 107,000 spindles.

The company operated until 1930. Since then, it has been occupied by various small businesses, including garment manufacturers for many years. Mill #1 is currently occupied by Klear-Vu Shipping Corporation and New England Shirt Company, a garment manufacturer.

In 2010, a fire started by an arsonist did little damage to the mill.

== See also ==
- List of mills in Fall River, Massachusetts
- National Register of Historic Places listings in Fall River, Massachusetts
