= Sanford Spinning Co. =

- Sanford Spinning Co. and Globe Yarn Mills No. 3
- U.S. National Register of Historic Places
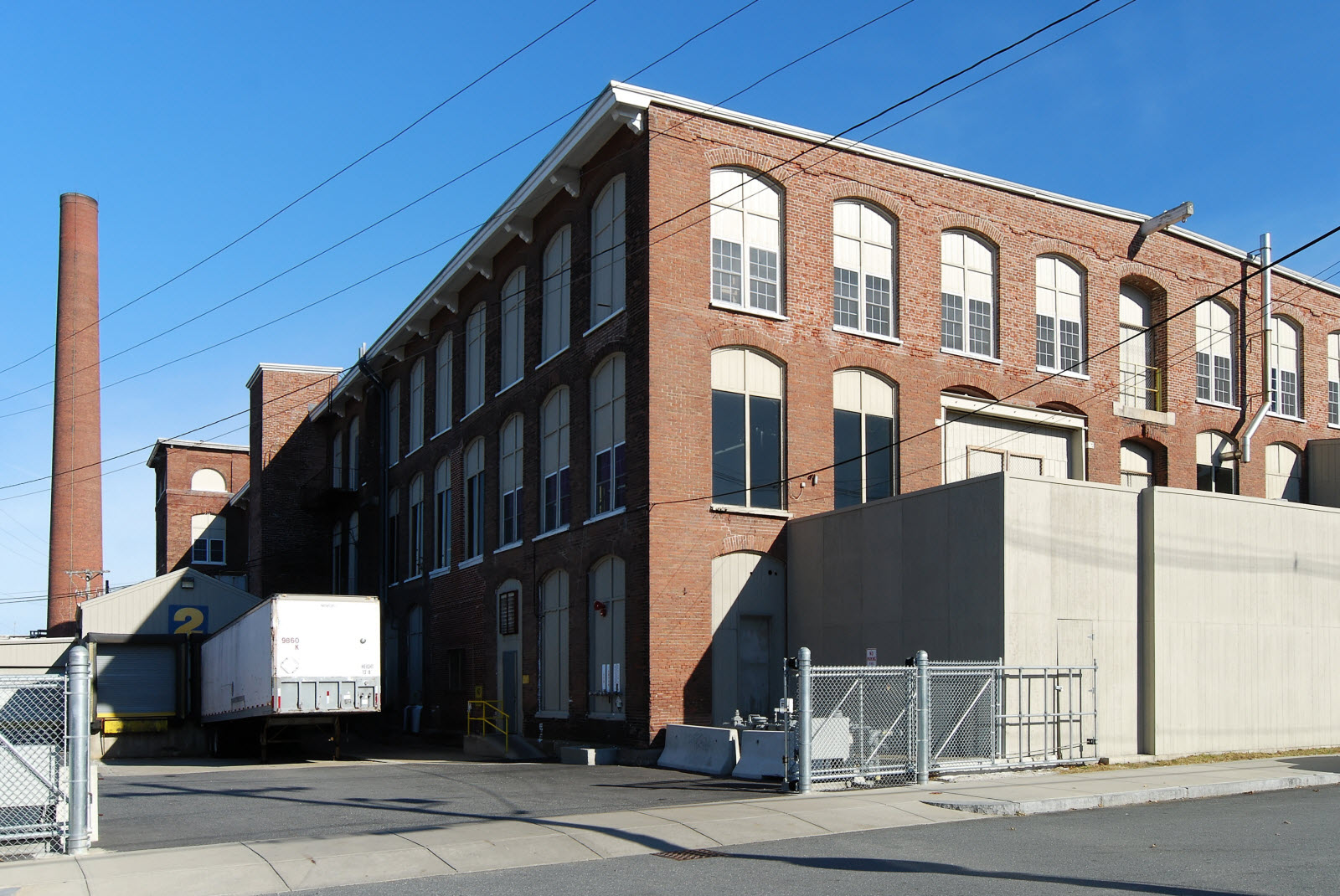
- Sanford Spinning Mill No. 1

- Location within Massachusetts Location within the United States
- Location: Fall River, Massachusetts
- Coordinates: 41°41′33″N 71°10′45″W
- Built: 1887 (Globe No. 3); 1891 (Sanford No. 1)
- MPS: Fall River MRA
- NRHP reference No.: 83000714
- Added to NRHP: February 16, 1983

Sanford Spinning Company is an historic mill complex located on Globe Mills Avenue in Fall River, Massachusetts. It was added to the National Register of Historic Places in 1983, along with the adjacent Globe Yarn Mills #3.

== History ==
The Globe Yarn Company was founded in 1881 by William H. Jennings and Arnold B. Sanford. Mill No. 1 was built soon after on Globe Street. Mill No. 2 was added in 1885, just downhill of the first mill. In 1887, Mill No. 3 was built on Globe Mills Avenue. It is 354 feet long by 100 feet wide. The two Globe Street mills were added to the National Register of Historic Places under a separate listing, as Globe Yarn Mills.

In 1891, the Sanford Spinning Company was established on Globe Mills Avenue by Arnold B. Sanford and Arthur H. Mason for the production of fine cotton yarns. Mill No. 1 is built of brick, and is three stories, measuring 374 feet long by 100 feet with. It initially contained about 37,300 mule spindles. The company also built a dye house to the north of the main mill, measuring 150 feet by 68 feet with 2 1/2 stories.

In 1899, the mill, along with the nearby Globe Yarn Mills became part of the New England Cotton Yarns Company, a conglomerate of spinning mills based in New Bedford, with plants in Taunton and North Dighton as well. In 1917, the Sanford Mill was sold to the Passaic Cotton Mills, of New Jersey. It was subsequently sold to American Cotton Fabric Corporation in 1923. The following year, the mill was acquired by Firestone Tire & Rubber Company and operated as Firestone Cotton Mills, for the production of tire yarns.

In 1920, Firestone also built a second, new two story mill to the west of the former Globe Yarn Mill No. 3, which it had also acquired. The property is now part of Duro Industries. Former Firestone Mill No. 3, along with the original Sanford dye house have since demolished for the construction of the new Kuss Middle School.

== See also ==
- National Register of Historic Places listings in Fall River, Massachusetts
- List of mills in Fall River, Massachusetts
