= Durfee Mills =

- U.S. National Register of Historic Places
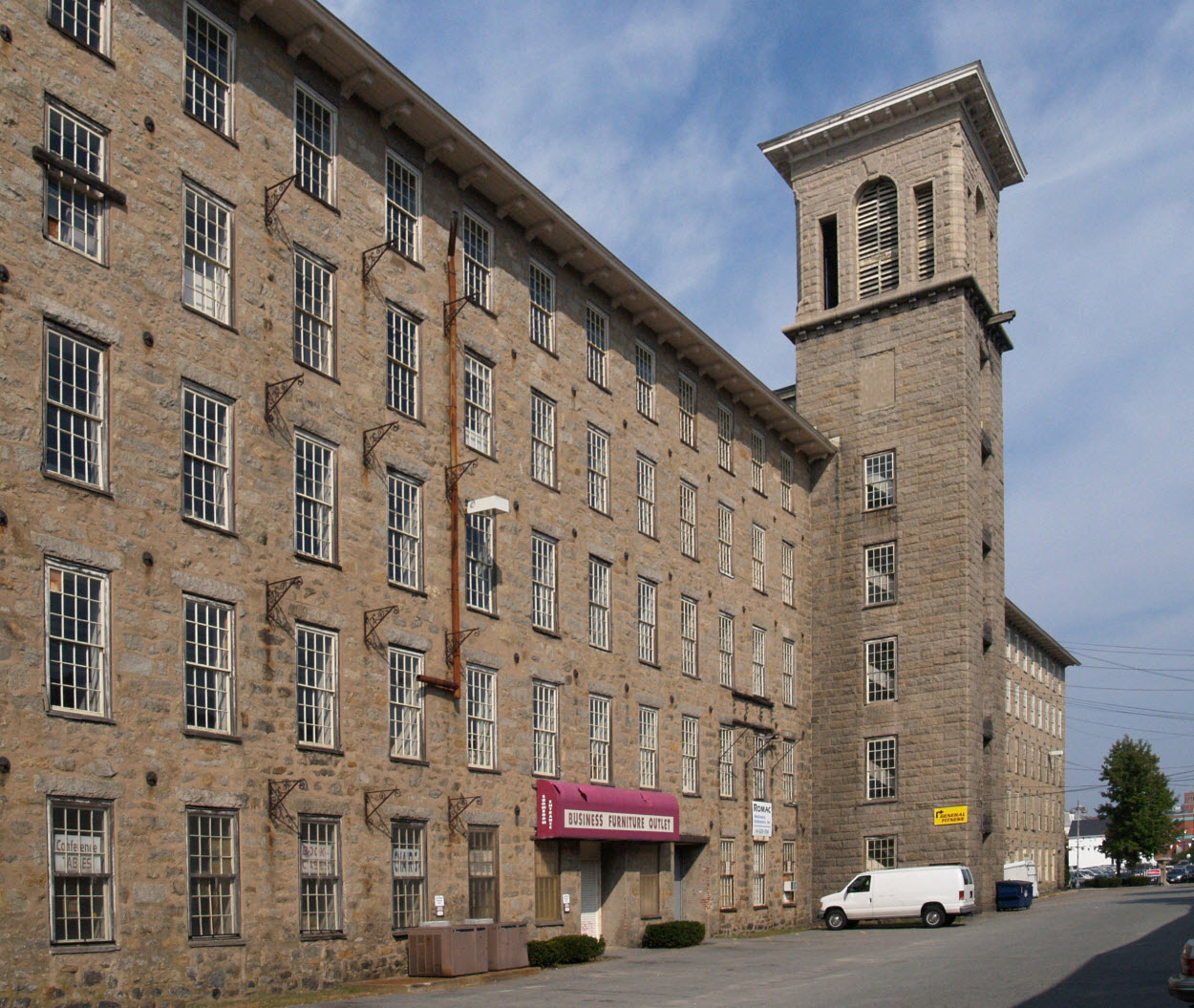
- Mill No. 2

- Location within Massachusetts Location within the United States
- Location: Fall River, Massachusetts
- Coordinates: 41°41′54″N 71°8′59″W
- Built: 1866
- Architectural style: Italianate
- MPS: Fall River MRA
- NRHP reference No.: 83000664
- Added to NRHP: February 16, 1983

Durfee Mills is an historic textile mill complex located at 359-479 Pleasant Street in Fall River, Massachusetts, USA. Developed between 1866 and 1904, it was during its period of development the city's largest and architecturally finest mill complex. Along with the adjacent Union Mills, it is occupied by numerous retail businesses and a restaurant, and is known as the Durfee-Union Mills. The complex was listed on the National Register of Historic Places in 1983.

== Description and history ==
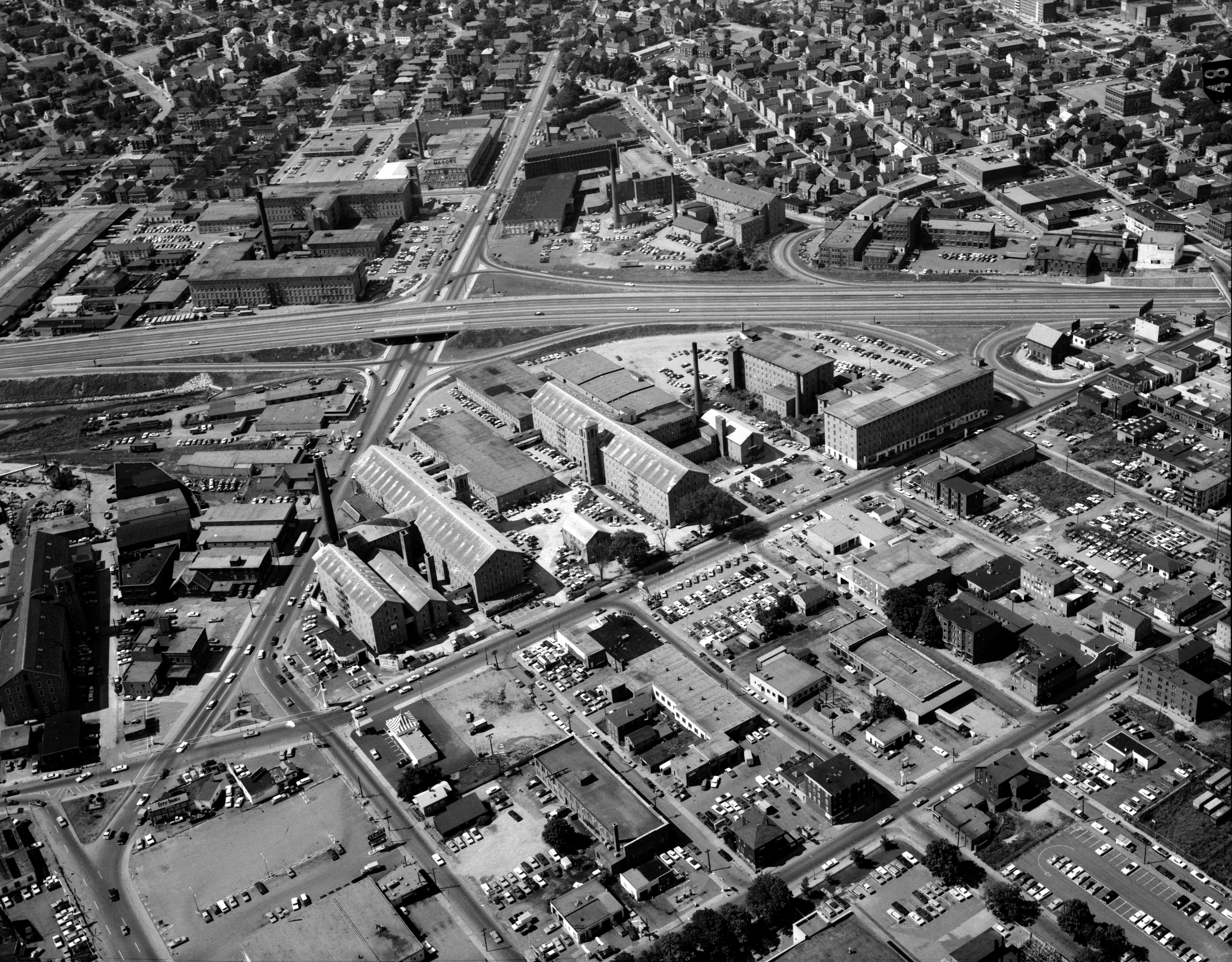
Durfee Mills in 1968

The Durfee Mills are located in geographically central Fall River, overlooking the northern bank of the Quequechan River, on a roughly triangular parcel bounded on the north by Pleasant Street and the southeast by Plymouth Avenue. The complex includes two main mill buildings and a large number of secondary buildings, all built out of native Fall River granite. The main mills are similar 5-1/2 story structures, oriented north-south, with their main facades facing each other. Their prominent features are seven-story Italianate towers located at the center of the main facades. Most of the outbuildings are either one or two stories in height; the notable exception is the Number 3 Mill, a smaller 5-1/2 story building located at the corner of Pleasant and Plymouth. The building are noted for their high quality architecture, in particular the main office building.

Durfee Mills was organized in 1866 with $500,000 of capital, with B.M.C. Durfee as its principal stockholder and first president. Mill No. 1 was built in 1866 for the manufacture of cotton cloth. The company was named in honor of Durfee's father Bradford, who is credited with starting Fall River's industrial complex and for building many of its early mills. The Durfee mill complex is the largest, and most complete to survive of the city's 19th-century mills. Mill No. 2 was added in 1871, and Mill No. 3 in 1881, raising the capacity to 109,360 spindles. It produced 23 million yards of cotton cloth annually. The company was liquidated in 1935. In 1968, the site was photographed by Jack E. Boucher as part of the Historic American Buildings Survey.

== See also ==
- National Register of Historic Places listings in Fall River, Massachusetts
- List of mills in Fall River, Massachusetts
