= King Philip Mills =

- U.S. National Register of Historic Places
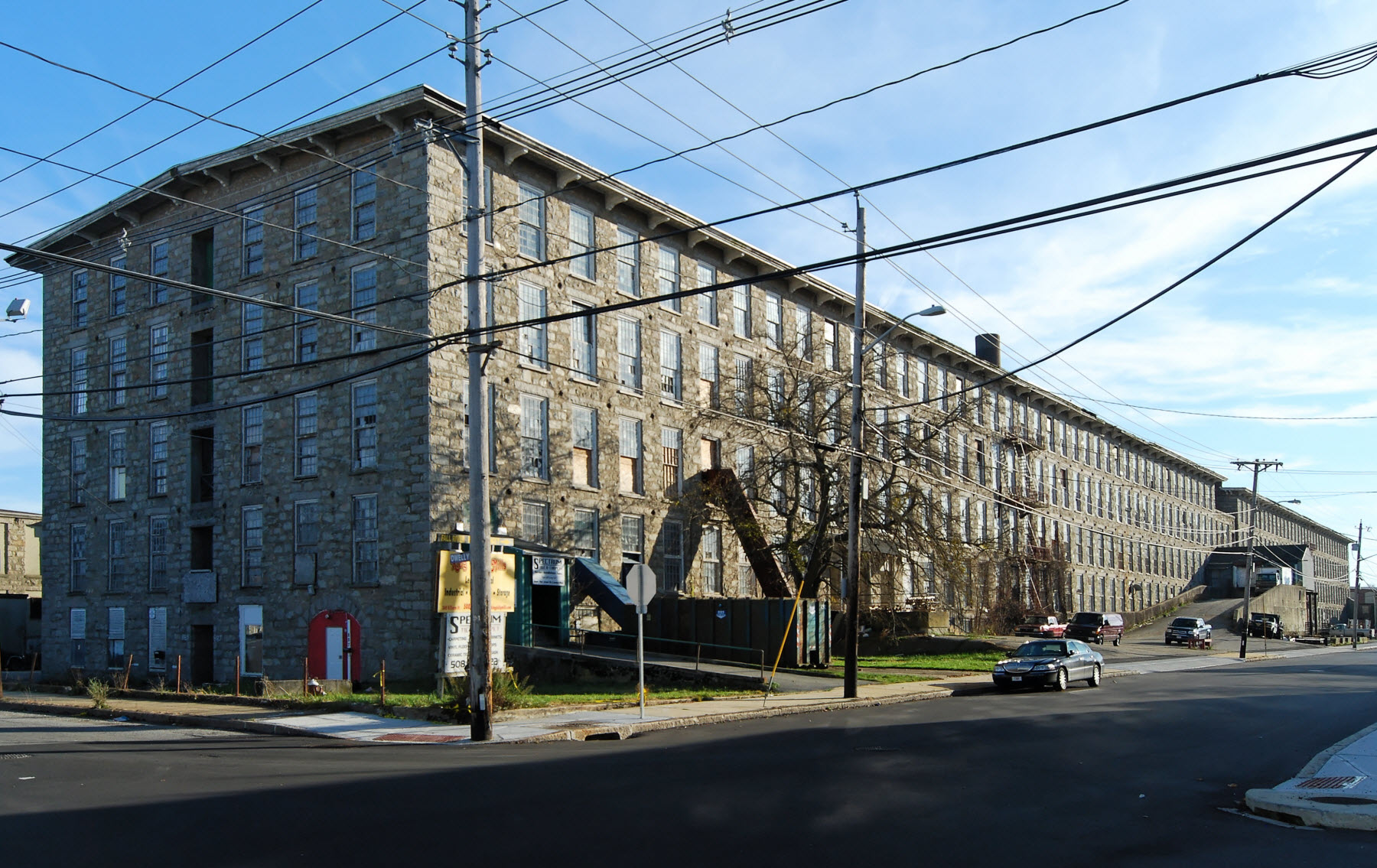

- Location within Massachusetts Location within the United States
- Location: 372 Kilburn St., Fall River, Massachusetts
- Coordinates: 41°40′55″N 71°10′21″W
- Built: 1871
- Architect: William F. Sherman; Frank P. Sheldon
- MPS: Fall River MRA
- NRHP reference No.: 83000687
- Added to NRHP: February 16, 1983

King Philip Mills is an historic cotton mill complex located at 372 Kilburn Street in Fall River, Massachusetts. Developed between 1871 and 1892, it was historically one of the city's largest mills, and its building inventory is still largely complete. The complex was added to the National Register of Historic Places in 1983.

== Description and history ==
The King Philip Mill complex is located in southern Fall River, on the northwest shore of Cook Pond. The complex is bounded on the north by Dwelly Street and the west by Kilburn Street. It consists of more than twelve interconnected buildings. Three of the large main mill buildings are built of locally quarried granite, with the 4-5 story Mills 1 and 2 joined by a picker house to form a structure with a unified facade 740 feet (230 m) in length; this is the longest such building in the city.

The King Philip Mill was organized with $500,000 in capital in 1871 and Mill No. 1 was built the same year. In 1881, capital was increased to $1,000,000 and Mill No. 2 was built. Mill No. 3 was added in 1888 for weaving. Mill No. 4 was built in 1892. The architectural design for the buildings was by William F. Sherman and Frank P. Sheldon; the latter was a prominent mill designer from Providence, Rhode Island. By 1917 the company had a capacity of 134,000 spindles and 3,000 looms. In 1930 the company was acquired by Berkshire Fine Spinning Associates which later became Berkshire Hathaway. Textile production ended on May 8, 1964, and the complex was used by a variety of light industrial concerns.

On the morning of January 3, 2012, the former office building of the mills was destroyed by arson.

== Demolition ==
The 750,000 square foot mill property was bought by developer Robert Kfoury in 2018, with plans to builds single-family homes there. Demolition of the mill complex began on May 29, 2018. All but one building will be demolished.

== See also ==
- National Register of Historic Places listings in Fall River, Massachusetts
- List of mills in Fall River, Massachusetts
