= Crescent Mill =

- U.S. National Register of Historic Places
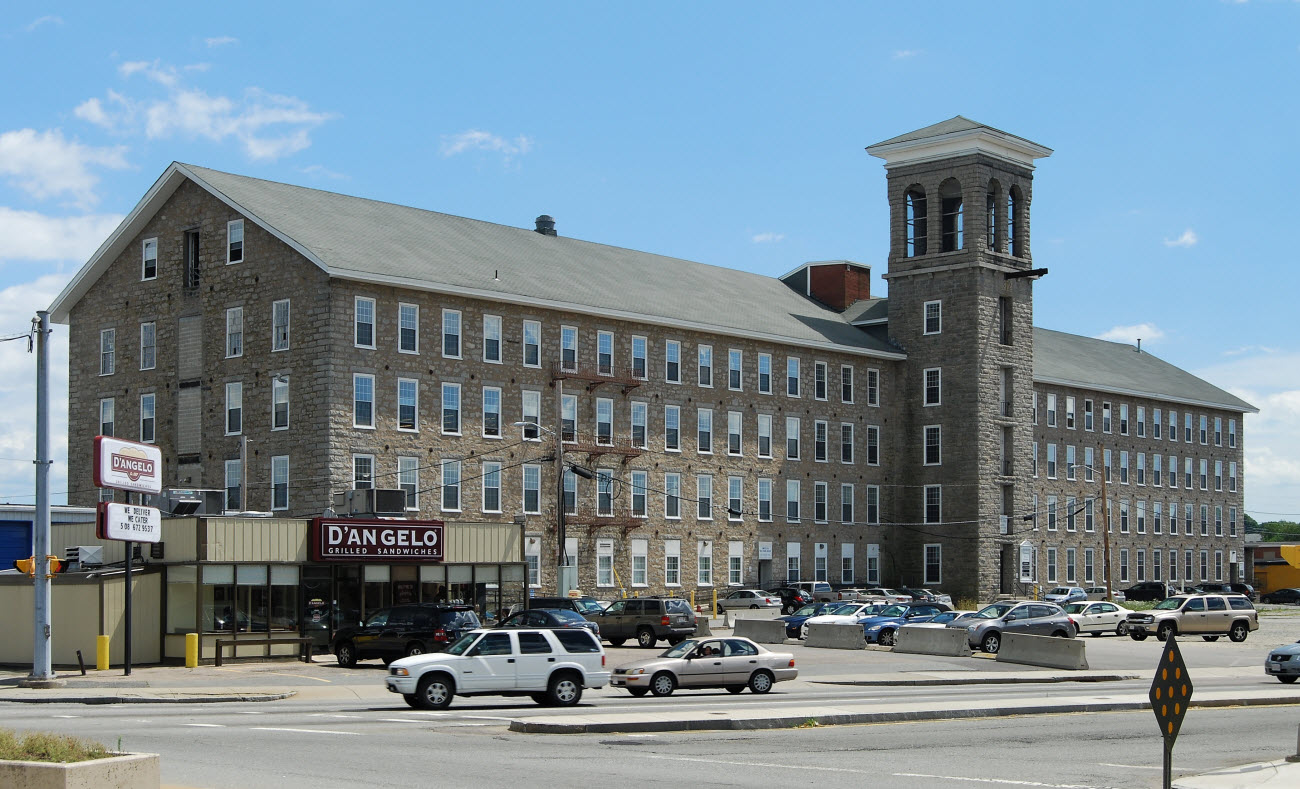

- Location within Massachusetts Location within the United States
- Location: 54 Front St., Fall River, Massachusetts
- Coordinates: 41°41′51″N 71°8′49″W
- Built: 1872
- Architectural style: Italianate
- MPS: Fall River MRA
- NRHP reference No.: 83000659
- Added to NRHP: February 16, 1983

Crescent Mill, later Merchant Mill No. 3, is a historic cotton textile mill located at 54 Front Street in Fall River, Massachusetts. Built in 1872 during an industrial construction boom, it is one of the city's finest examples of Italianate mill architecture. The building was added to the National Register of Historic Places in 1983. It is now used for other light industrial purposes.

== Description and history ==
Crescent Mill stands in geographically central Fall River, at the southeast corner of Pleasant and Front Streets. The mill is a long rectangular four-story structure, measuring 339 by 74 feet (103 m × 23 m). It is built out of rough-cut native Fall River granite in the Italianate style, except for its six-story tower, which is fashioned out of dressed ashlar granite. The top floor of the mill has an unusual column-free space, made possible by suspending its ceiling from the roof trusses.

The mill was built by the Crescent Mill Corporation in 1872; its design is credited to the company treasurer, Lafayette Nichols. Benjamin Covel served as the company's first president. The mill, powered by steam, had a capacity of 33,280 spindles at the outset, producing brown sheetings and fine fabrics. The mill was sold to Merchants Manufacturing Company in 1893, and became known as Merchant's Mill No. 3. Merchants had built its first two mills across Pleasant Street; they were destroyed by fire in 1934. This mill was closed as a textile operation in 1931.

== See also ==
- National Register of Historic Places listings in Fall River, Massachusetts
- List of mills in Fall River, Massachusetts
