= Wyoming Mills =

- U.S. National Register of Historic Places
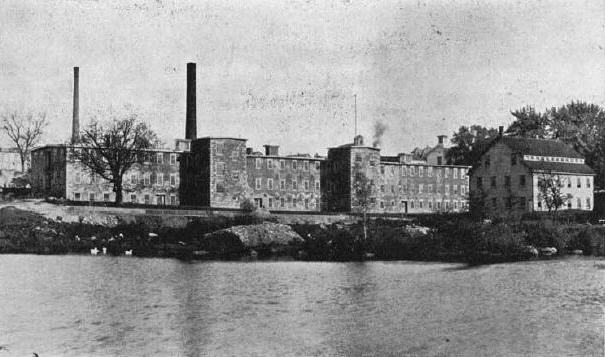
- Marshall Hat Company / Wyoming Mills, ca. 1903

- Location within Massachusetts Location within the United States
- Location: 110 Chace St., Fall River, Massachusetts
- Coordinates: 41°41′20″N 71°10′24″W
- MPS: Fall River MRA
- NRHP reference No.: 83004613
- Added to NRHP: April 24, 2024

Wyoming Mills is an historic textile mill site located at 110 Chace Avenue in Fall River, Massachusetts. It is also known as the former Marshall Hat Factory site.

The Wyoming Mills company was established in 1845 by Augustus Chace and William B. Trafford for the manufacture of cotton twine.

In 1896, the site was acquired by the James Marshall & Brothers hat company, which added a large red brick mill on the site. By 1911, the company employed 1,500 people and made more than 7,200 derby hats per day.

The site was determined eligible for the National Historic Register in 1983, but was not listed due to the owner's objection. It was eventually listed on the National Register in 2024.

The site is currently owned by Duro Industries, a textile dyeing and finishing company.

== See also ==
- National Register of Historic Places listings in Fall River, Massachusetts
- List of mills in Fall River, Massachusetts
