= Laurel Lake Mills =

Historic textile mill in Massachusetts, United States

Coordinates: 41°41′20″N 71°10′24″W

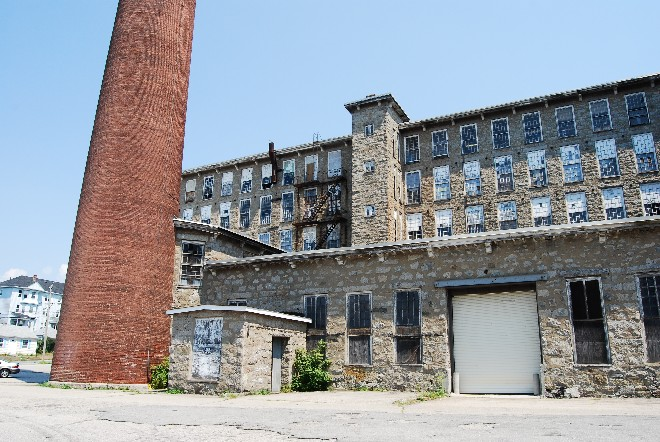
Laurel Lake Mills, Mill No. 1

Laurel Lake Mills is an historic textile mill site located at 951 Broadway in Fall River, Massachusetts.

The company was organized in 1881 for the manufacture of cotton yarns, with John P. Slade its first president. Mill No. 1 was built soon after. The attached Mill No. 2 was later added. The mills were steam powered and are constructed of native Fall River granite.

Production of textiles ceased in 1931.

The site was determined eligible for the National Register of Historic Places (NRHP number 83004612) in 1983, but omitted due to owner's objection.

== See also ==
- List of mills in Fall River, Massachusetts
