= Stafford Mills =

- U.S. National Register of Historic Places
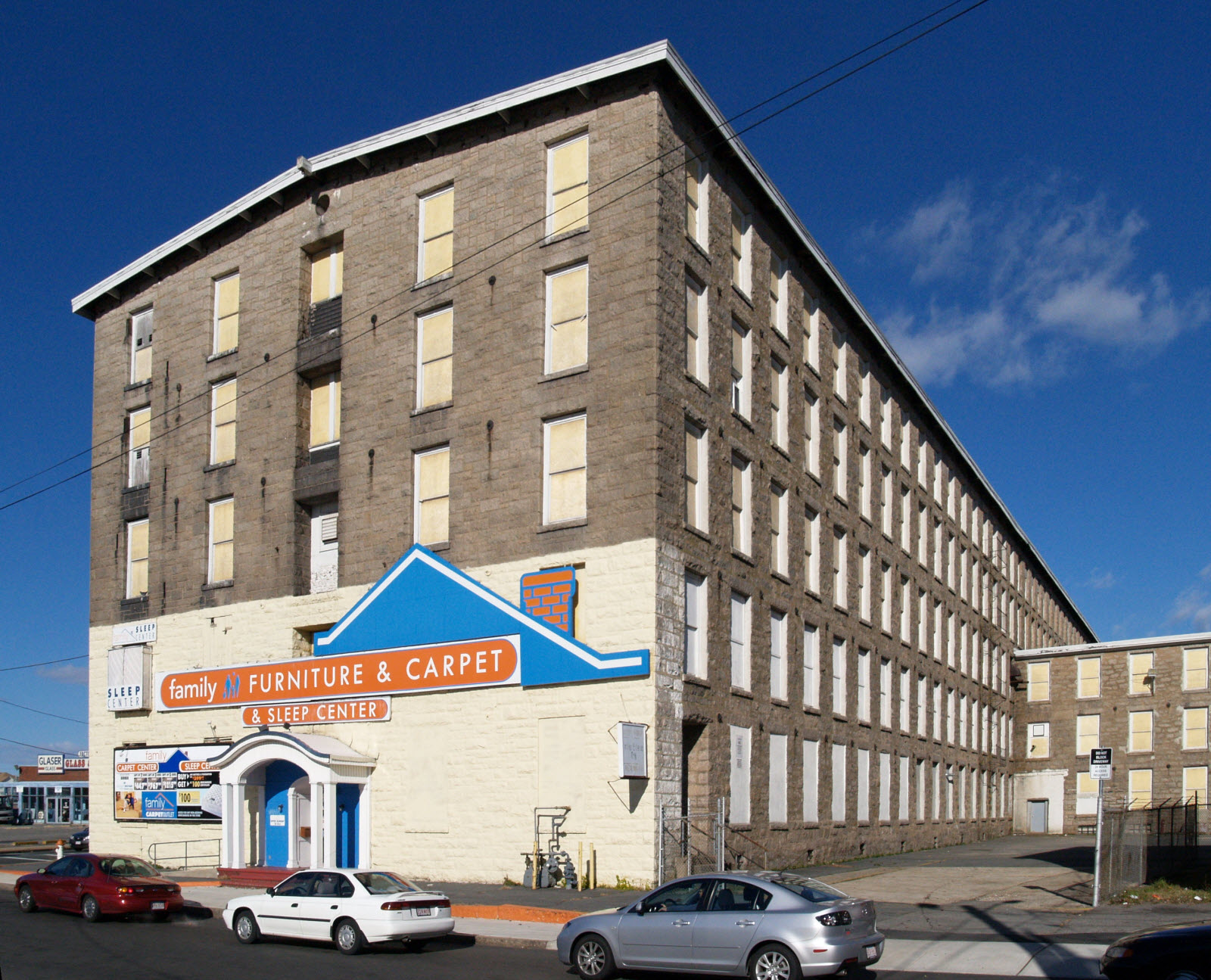

- Location within Massachusetts Location within the United States
- Location: County and Quarry Sts., Fall River, Massachusetts
- Coordinates: 41°41′46″N 71°8′21″W
- Area: 7 acres (2.8 ha)
- Built: 1872
- Architectural style: Romanesque
- MPS: Fall River MRA
- NRHP reference No.: 83000718
- Added to NRHP: February 16, 1983

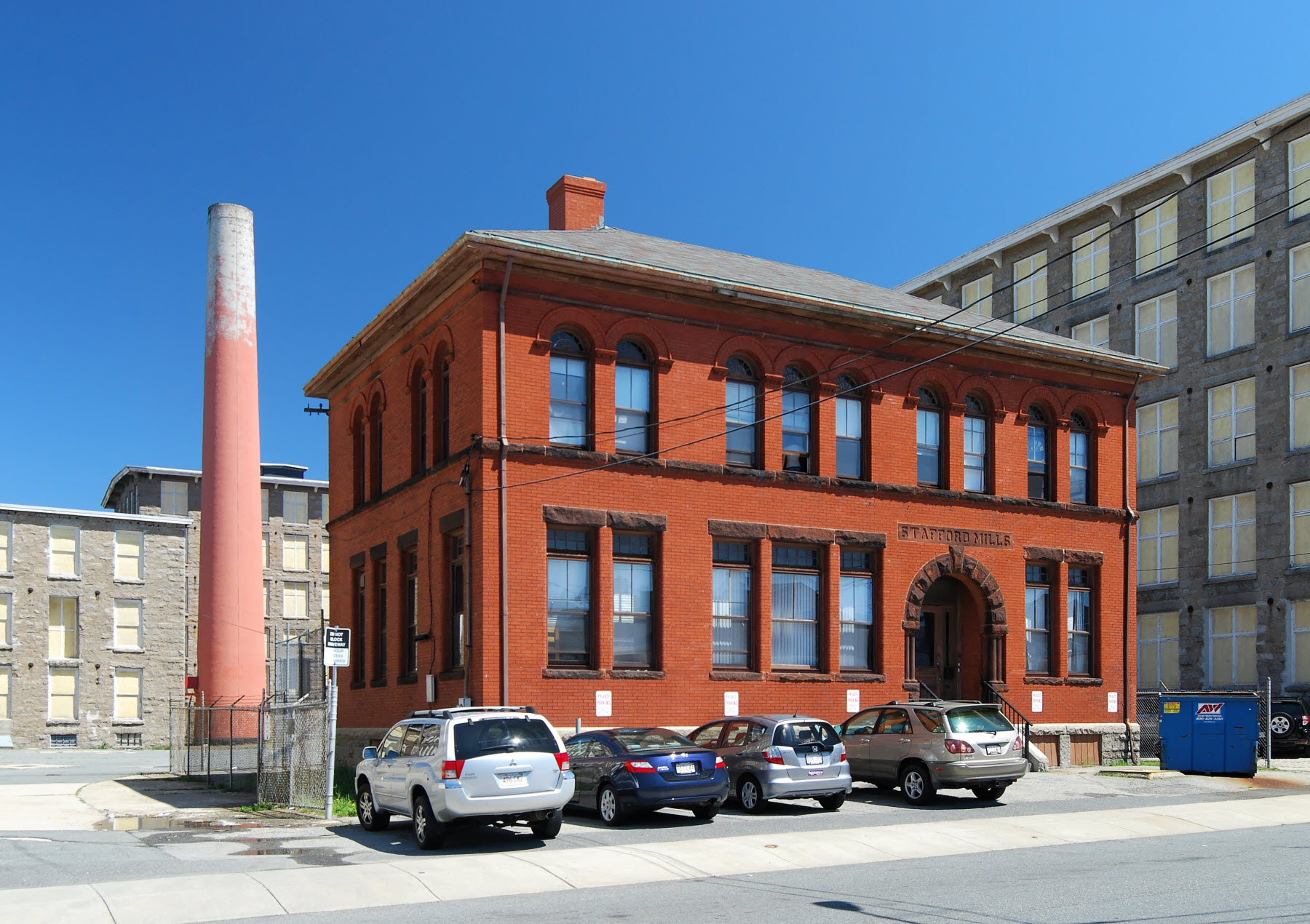
Stafford Mills office

Stafford Mills is an historic textile mill complex located on County Street in Fall River, Massachusetts, USA. Founded in 1872, it is a well-preserved late-19th century textile complex, typical of the mills built in Fall River during its period of most rapid growth. It is noted in particular for its exceptionally fine Romanesque brick office building. The complex was added to the National Register of Historic Places in 1983.

== Description and history ==
The Stafford Mills complex is located east of downtown Fall River, on 7 acres (2.8 ha) at the northeast corner of Quarry and County Streets. It consists of a series of interconnected buildings, most built at different times. The two principal mill buildings are both five stories tall, built of Fall River granite; Mill Number 2 is slightly larger, but Mill Number 1 has a large two-story weave shed attached to its northern end. The buildings are somewhat unusual in not having towers, a common mill feature. Set in the mill yard between these two structures are attached picker and boiler houses, also built of granite. The office building stands at the center of the southern end of the millyard, facing County Street; it is a two-story Romanesque brick building.

== History ==
The Stafford Mills company was incorporated in 1870 with Foster H. Stafford as its first president. The two mills were built in 1872 and 1888, and the office building was added in 1892. The company produced print cloths, and operated until 1929 when it was closed.

Today, the complex is occupied by a variety of small businesses and a discount furniture store. The intersection of County Street, Pleasant Street and Quarry Street in front of the mill is known as Stafford Square.

Stafford Mills had a major fire on January 13, 2020 displacing many of the tenant companies and damaging the structure.

== See also ==
- National Register of Historic Places listings in Fall River, Massachusetts
- List of mills in Fall River, Massachusetts
