= Narragansett Mills =

- U.S. National Register of Historic Places
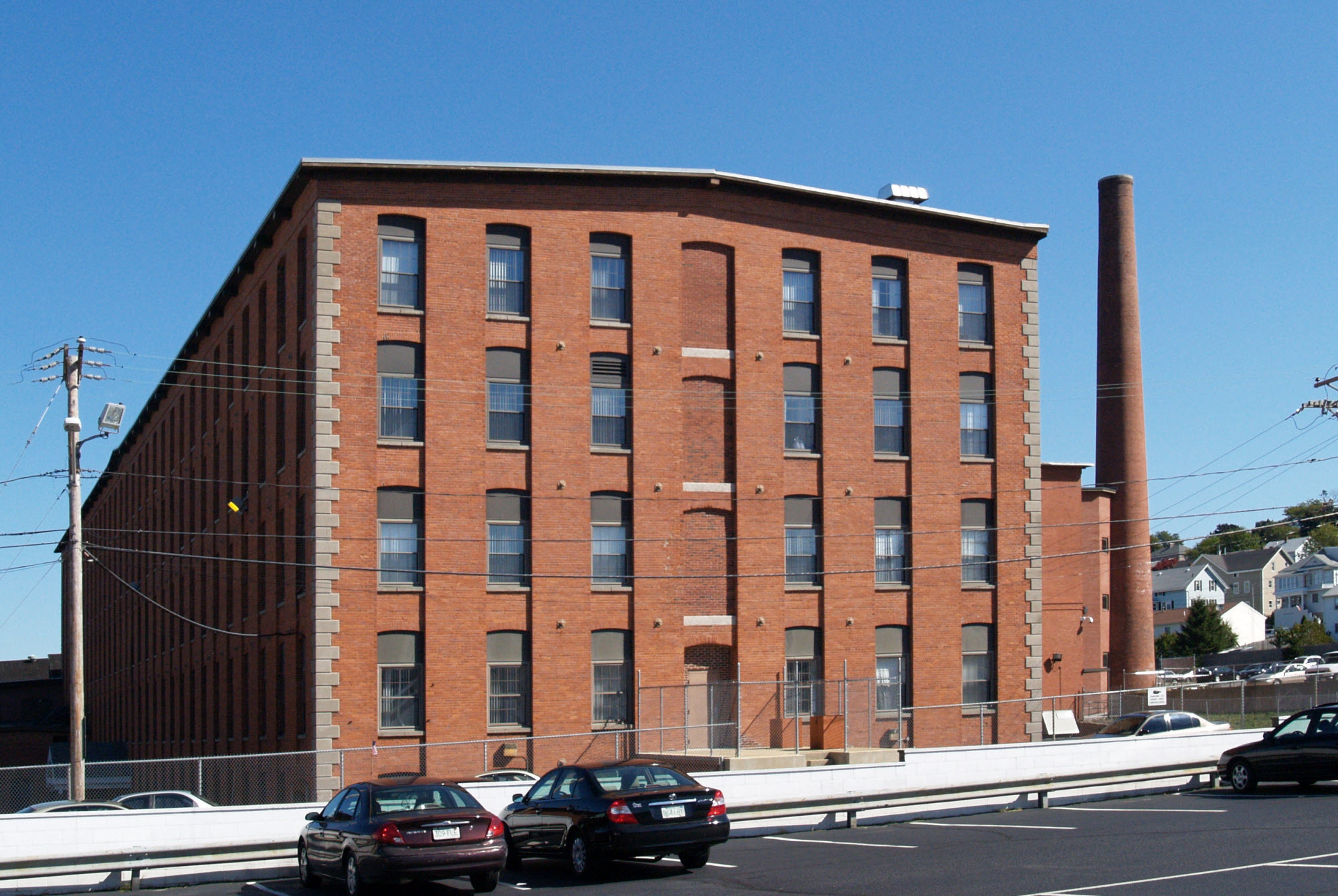
- Mill No. 1

- Location within Massachusetts Location within the United States
- Location: 1567 N. Main St., Fall River, Massachusetts
- Coordinates: 41°43′18″N 71°8′39″W
- Area: 7.3 acres (3.0 ha)
- Built: 1872
- Architectural style: Italianate
- MPS: Fall River MRA
- NRHP reference No.: 83000694
- Added to NRHP: February 16, 1983

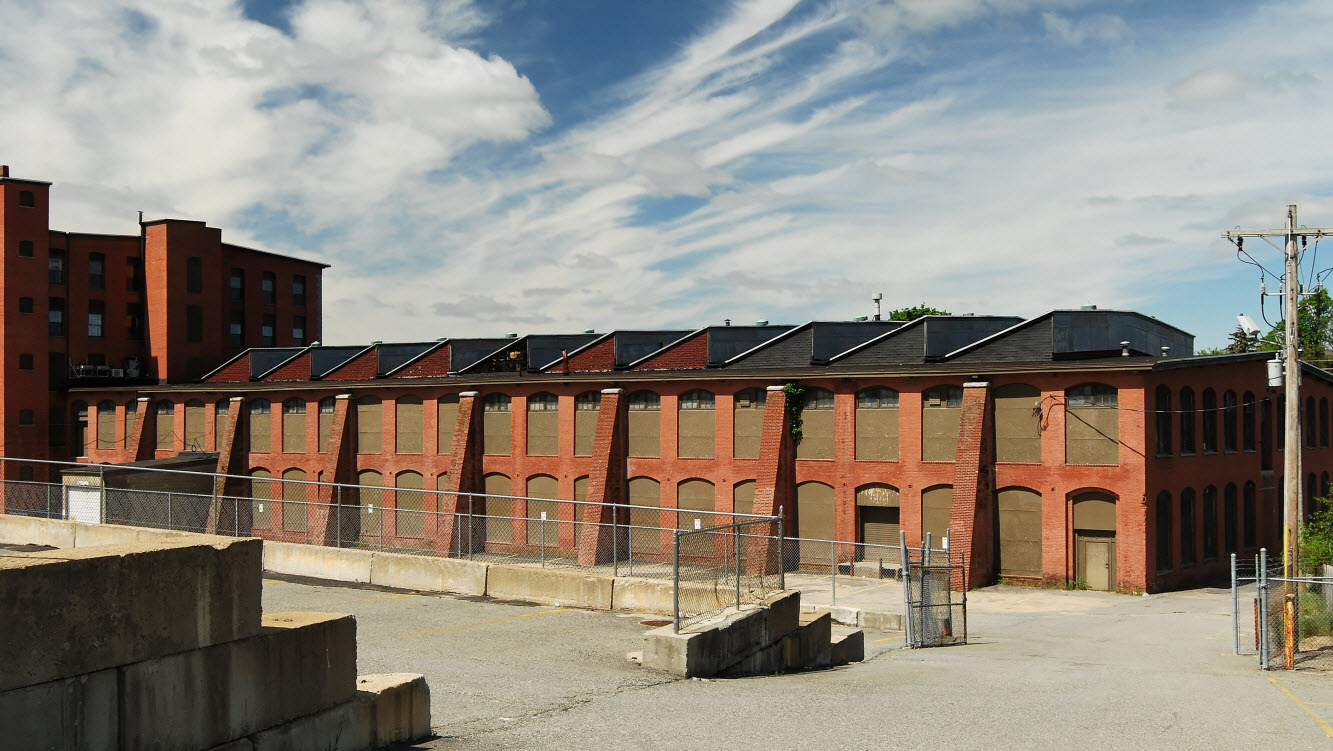
Mill No. 2

Narragansett Mills is a historic textile mill site located at 1567 North Main Street in Fall River, Massachusetts, United States. Built in 1872, it is a well-preserved example of a brick mill complex, somewhat unusual in a city where most of the mills are stone. It was listed on the National Register of Historic Places in 1983.

== Description and history ==
The Narragansett Mills complex is located north of downtown Fall River, on the east side of North Main Street at its junction with Narragansett Street. The complex consists of a series of attached buildings, most built out of brick. The main mill is five stories in height, with a shallow-pitch gabled roof. Decorative features include granite corner quoining and window sills, and a bracketed cornice. Attached to the north end is a large weave shed, originally two stories in height with a sawtooth roof. Projecting from the sides of the main mill are smaller engine, boiler, and picker houses, and a machine shop. The only detached building is the single-story main office, set directly at the street corner.

The mills were organized in 1871, and the first mill was built in 1872 from red brick in the Italianate style. The area where it was built had been opened for industrial development in 1870 by the introduction of steam power for operation of textile equipment. Because it was not near the city's granite quarries, it was less expensive to build in brick, resulting in the locally unusual choice of building material.

A Dorrance Easton served as the company's first president. The company operated on the premises until 1929, producing undyed print cloth and corset jeans. Today, Mill No. 1 has been remodeled and is occupied by medical offices. In December 2011, the second floor and roof of the weave shed was removed.

== See also ==
- National Register of Historic Places listings in Fall River, Massachusetts
- List of mills in Fall River, Massachusetts
