= Globe Yarn Mills =

- U.S. National Register of Historic Places
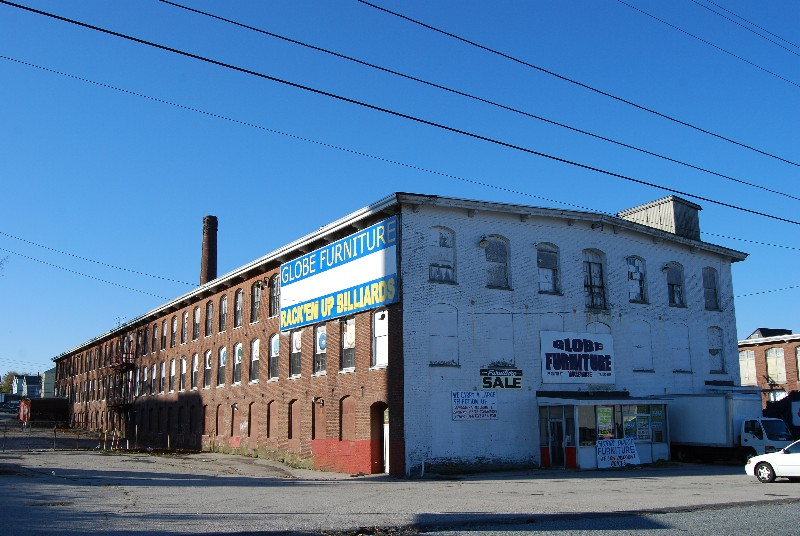
- Mill No. 2

- Location within Massachusetts Location within the United States
- Location: Fall River, Massachusetts
- Coordinates: 41°41′20″N 71°10′24″W
- Built: 1881
- MPS: Fall River MRA
- NRHP reference No.: 83000671
- Added to NRHP: February 16, 1983

Globe Yarn Mills are two historic textile mills located at 460 Globe Street in Fall River, Massachusetts.

The company was incorporated in 1881 for the manufacture of cotton yarns. Mill No. 1 was completed in 1881. William J. Jennings was the first president. Mill No. 2 was built in 1885 also from red brick. The company would later be acquired by the New Bedford Cotton Yarn Company, then American Cotton Fabric Company, and later the Connecticut Company in 1920.

The site was added to the National Register of Historic Places in 1983. Globe Yarn Mills No. 3, built in 1887 on nearby Globe Mills Avenue was added under a separate listing with the Sanford Spinning Co.

For many years the mills were the site of Globe Mill Discount Center and also a flea market.

== See also ==
- National Register of Historic Places listings in Fall River, Massachusetts
- List of mills in Fall River, Massachusetts
