= Border City Mills =

Coordinates: 41°43′33″N 71°8′43″W

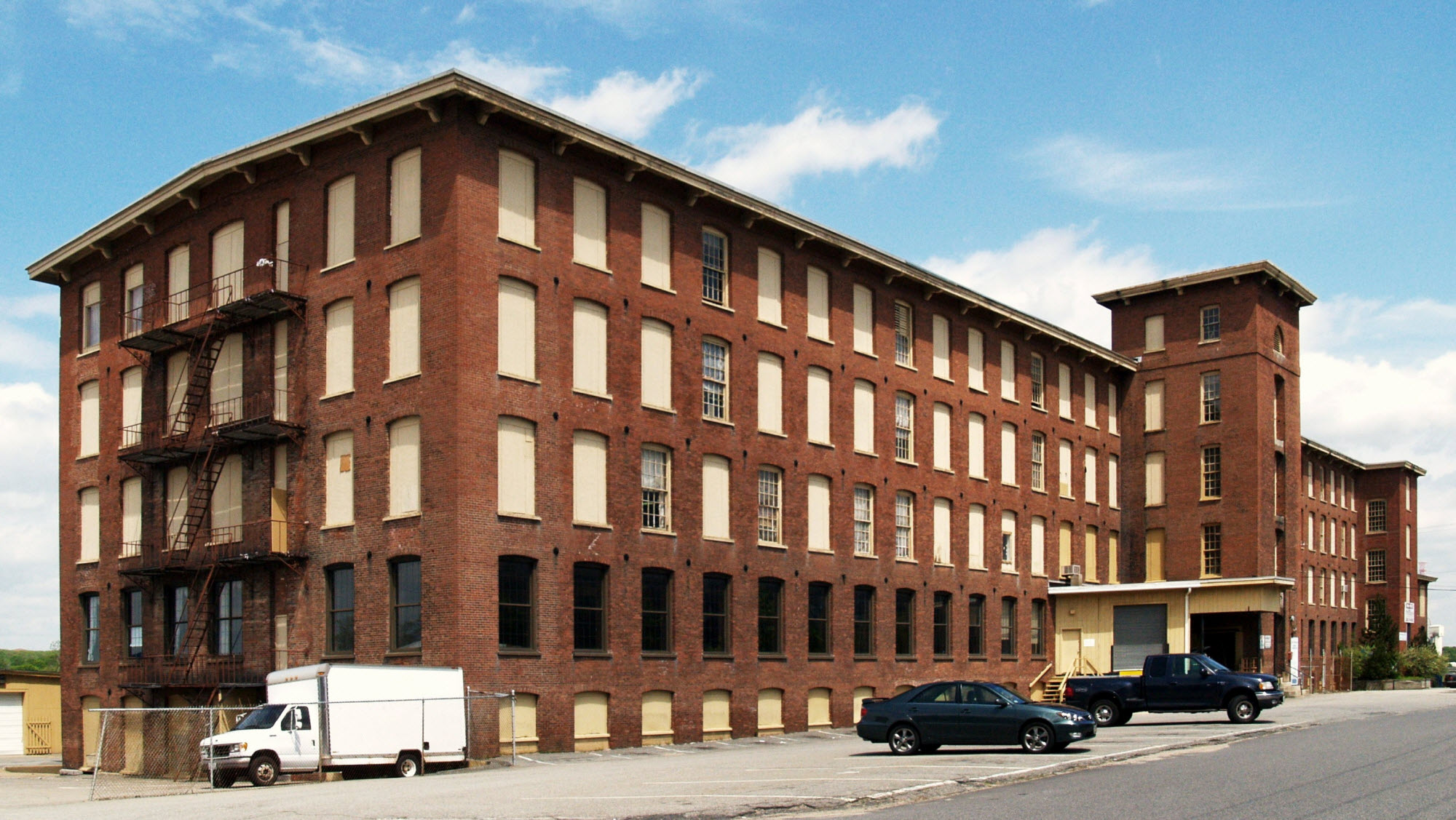

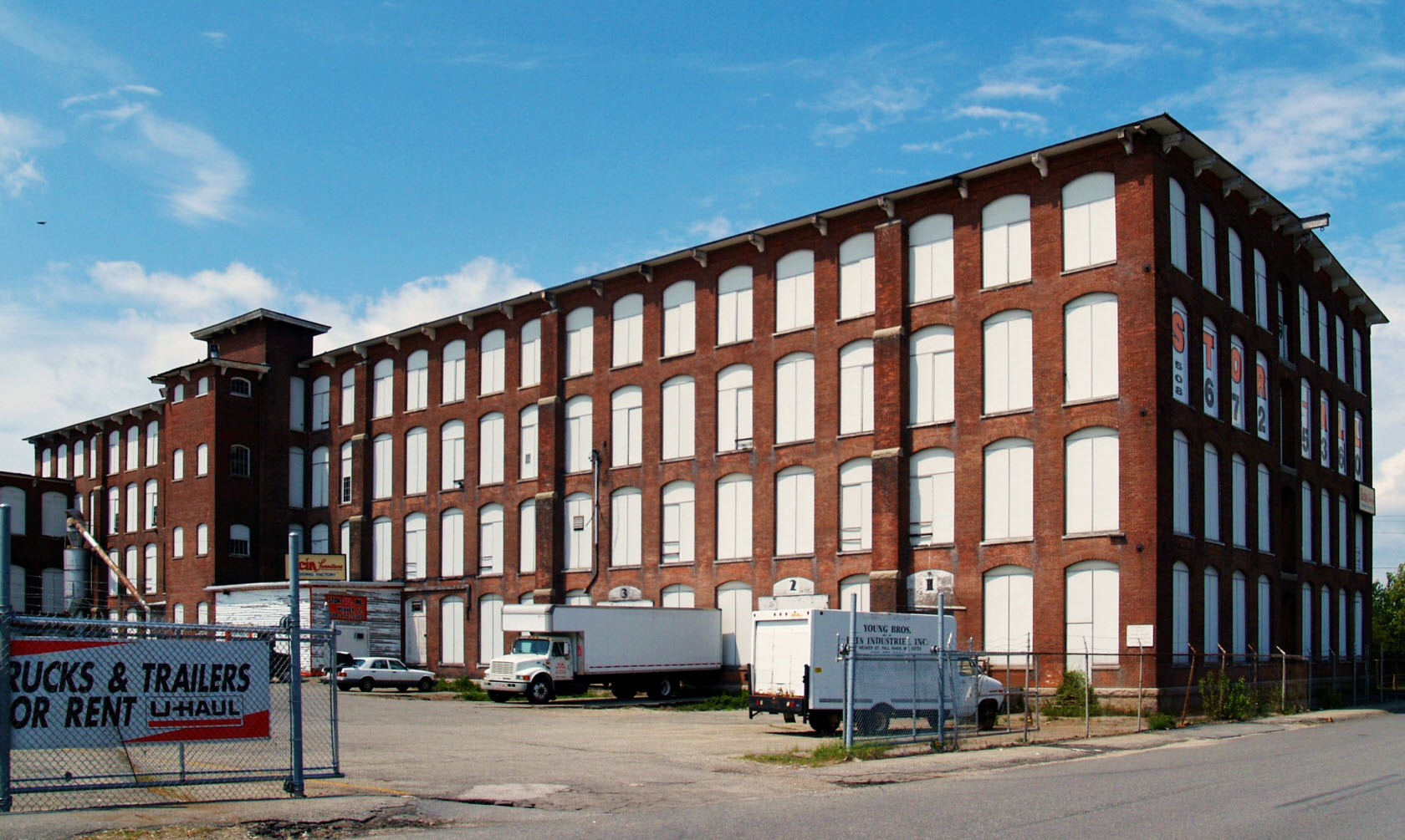
Border City Mill No. 3

Border City Mills is an historic textile mill site located at the corner of West Street and Weaver Street in Fall River, Massachusetts.

The company was established in 1873 for the manufacture of cotton textiles. The company's first president was S. Angier Chace and George T. Hathaway was treasurer.

The first Mill No.1 was erected in 1873 but was destroyed by fire in 1877. The current Mill No.1, located on West Street was constructed in 1880, from red brick, but of less ornate construction than the original 1873 mill.

During the financial crisis of 1879, the company was re-organized with John S. Brayton as president.

Mill No. 3 was later built 1888, on Weaver Street. The company was still operating in 1940.

The site was determined eligible for the National Register of Historic Places in 1983 (NRHP number 83004614), but omitted due to owner's objection.

However, Border City Mill No. 2, nearby was later added in 1990, under a separate NRHP listing.

On February 20, 2016, an early morning fire destroyed Mill No. 3.

== See also ==
- List of Registered Historic Places in Fall River, Massachusetts
- List of mills in Fall River, Massachusetts
