= Hargraves Mill No. 1 =

Textile mill in Fall River, Massachusetts, US

- U.S. National Register of Historic Places
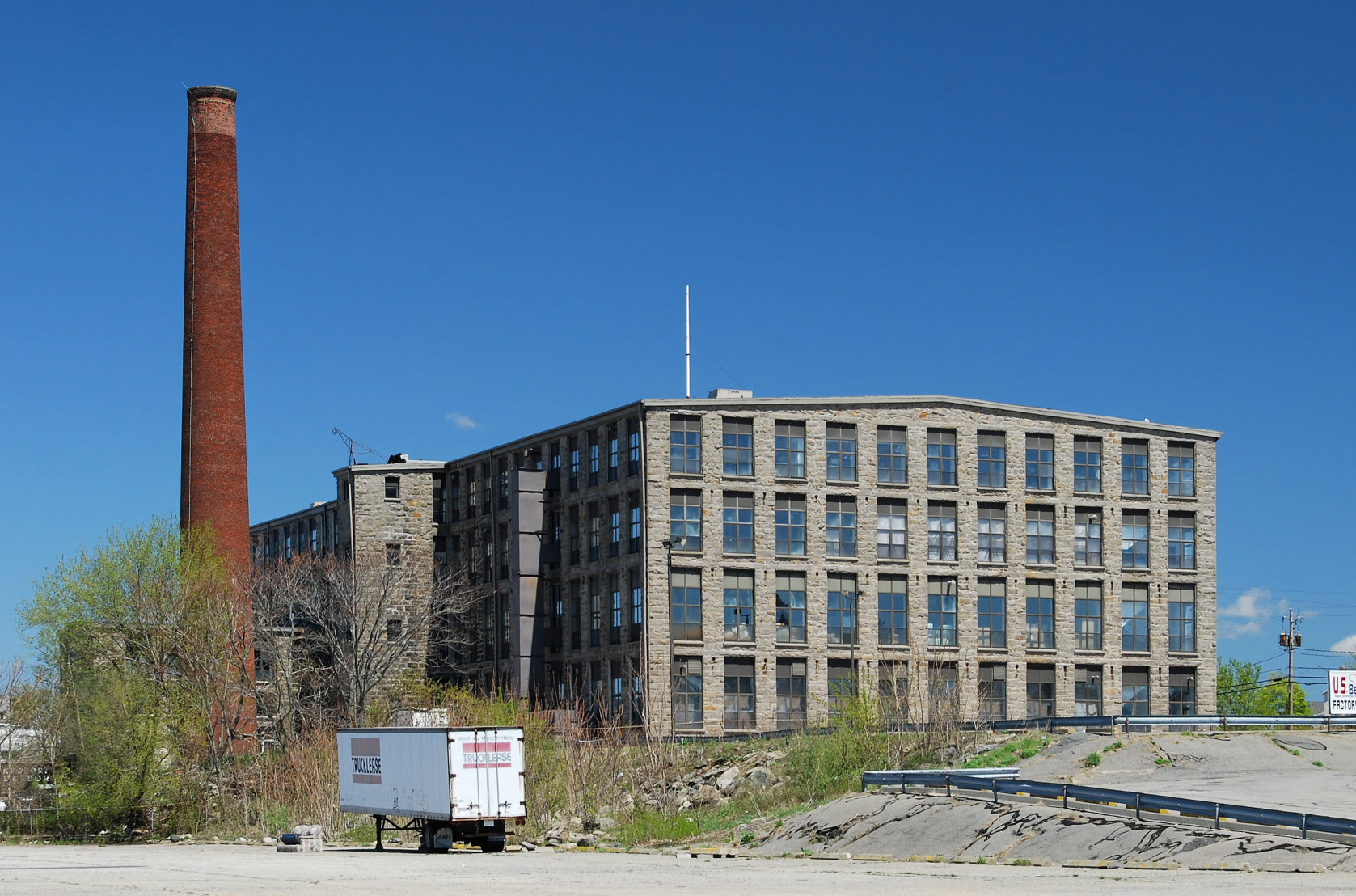

- Location within Massachusetts Location within the United States
- Location: Fall River, Massachusetts
- Coordinates: 41°41′33″N 71°8′25″W
- Built: 1888
- MPS: Fall River MRA
- NRHP reference No.: 83000675
- Added to NRHP: February 16, 1983

Hargraves Mill No. 1 is an historic textile mill on Quarry Street in Fall River, Massachusetts.

The mill was built in 1888 from native Fall River granite. Reuben Hargraves was the company's first president. The mill was taken over by Parker Mills in 1922.

The site was added to the National Register of Historic Places in 1983.

The mill went through an extensive remodeling and upgrading period in the early 21st century thanks to the work of Jose L. Cardozo.

The property was more recently part of the Quaker Fabric Corporation which closed in 2007.

== See also ==
- National Register of Historic Places listings in Fall River, Massachusetts
- List of mills in Fall River, Massachusetts
