= Wampanoag Mills =

- U.S. National Register of Historic Places
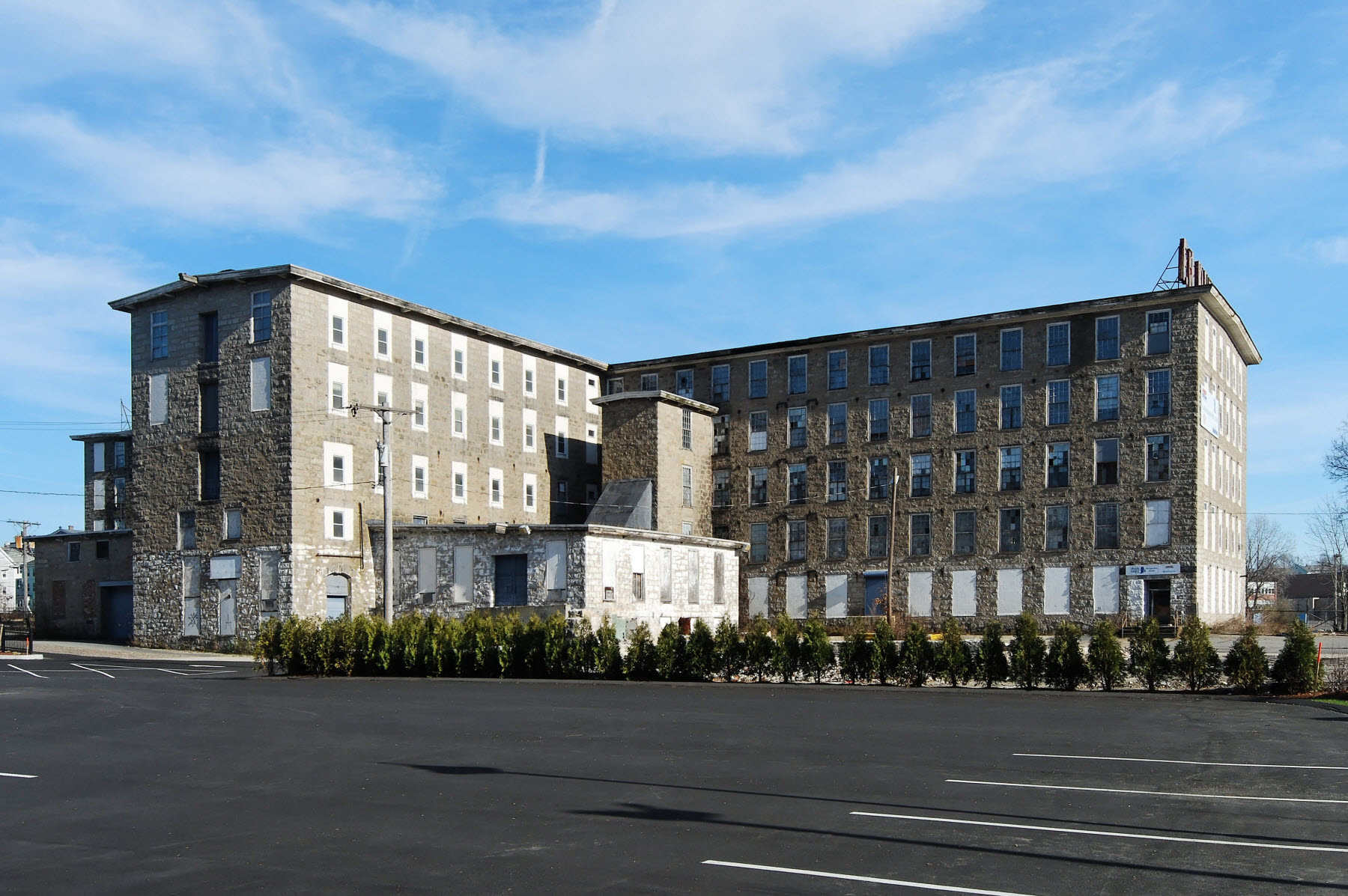
- Wampanoag Mill No. 2

- Location within Massachusetts Location within the United States
- Location: 420 Quequechan St., Fall River, Massachusetts
- Coordinates: 41°41′20″N 71°8′19″W
- Area: 8.6 acres (3.5 ha)
- Built: 1872
- MPS: Fall River MRA
- NRHP reference No.: 83000729
- Added to NRHP: February 16, 1983

Wampanoag Mills is a historic textile mill complex located at 420 Quequechan Street in Fall River, Massachusetts. Built beginning in 1871, it is a large and well-preserved example of granite textile mill construction. The site was added to the National Register of Historic Places in 1983.

== Description ==
The Wampanoag Mills are prominently situated at the corner of Quequechan and Alden Streets in central Fall River. Its buildings are located just northwest of the western junction of Interstate 195 and Massachusetts Route 24, with the two five-story main mill buildings highly visible from those roads. The complex has a large number of buildings, many attached to or part of the main buildings. The western building includes Mill Number 1 and the weave shed, while the eastern building consists of Mill Number 2 with a number of smaller attachments. Between the two there are two small storage buildings, one granite and the other wood-frame.

== History ==
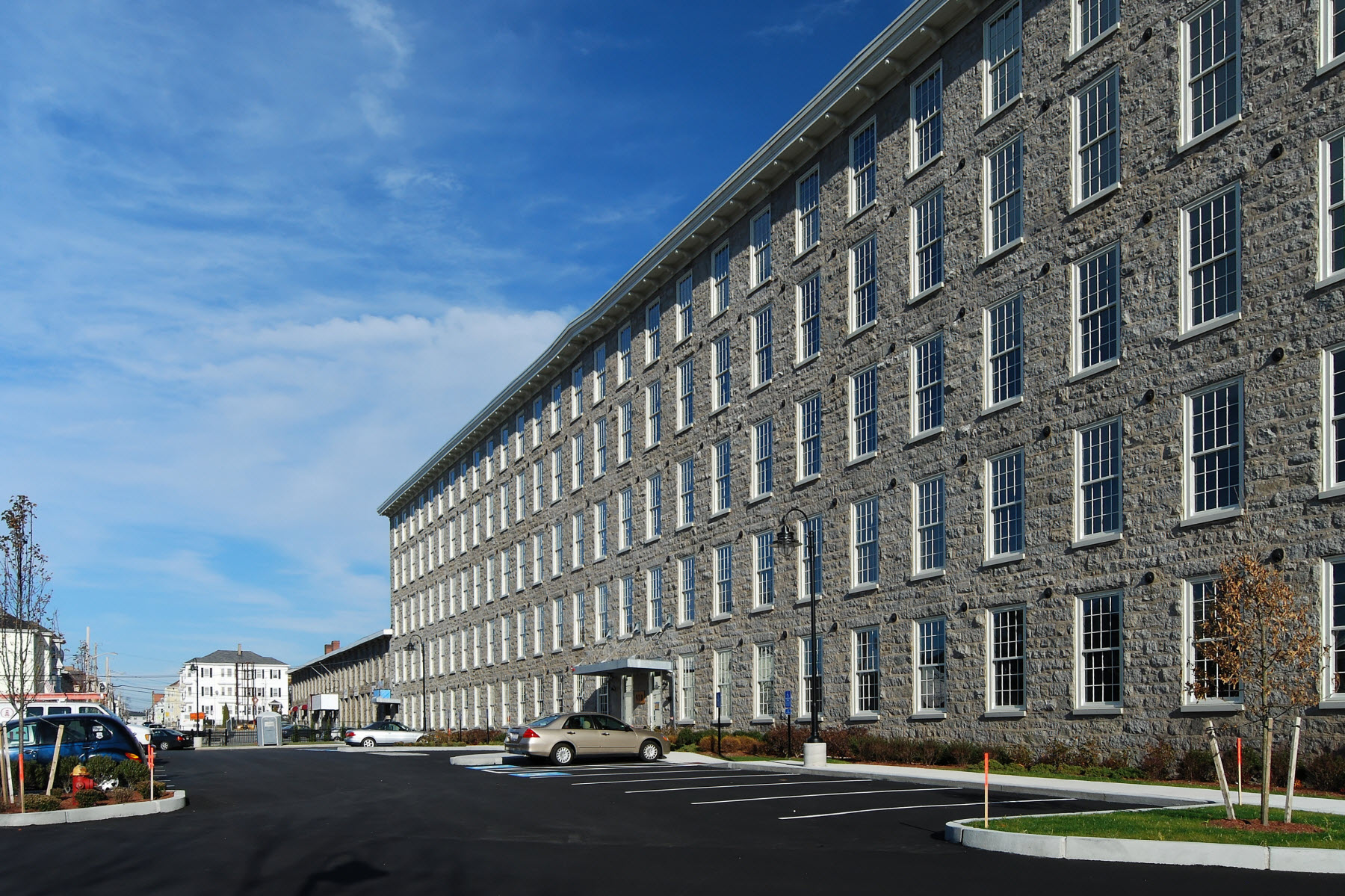
Wampanoag Mill No. 1

The Wampanoag Mills company was formed in 1871 for the manufacture of cotton textiles. Mill No. 1 was built on Quequechan Street in 1872 from native Fall River granite. Mill No. 2 was constructed in 1877, with access from Alden Street, increasing total capacity to 45,500 spindles. The mills were steam-powered. An attached two-story weave shed was also added to Mill No. 1. The mills closed in 1929.

In the 1980s, Mill No. 1 became part of the Fall River factory outlet district, and contained numerous small retail shops. This mill has since been renovated into senior apartments. A cultural center remains within the former weave shed attached to the north end of Mill No. 1.

Mill No. 2 formerly contained Fall River Knitting Mills (later known as Northeast Knitting Mills).

On the evening of April 16, 2010, a fire of suspicious origin broke out in a storage building next to the mills, formerly occupied by Parker's Candies.

== See also ==
- National Register of Historic Places listings in Fall River, Massachusetts
- List of mills in Fall River, Massachusetts
