= Foster Spinning Co. =

- U.S. National Register of Historic Places
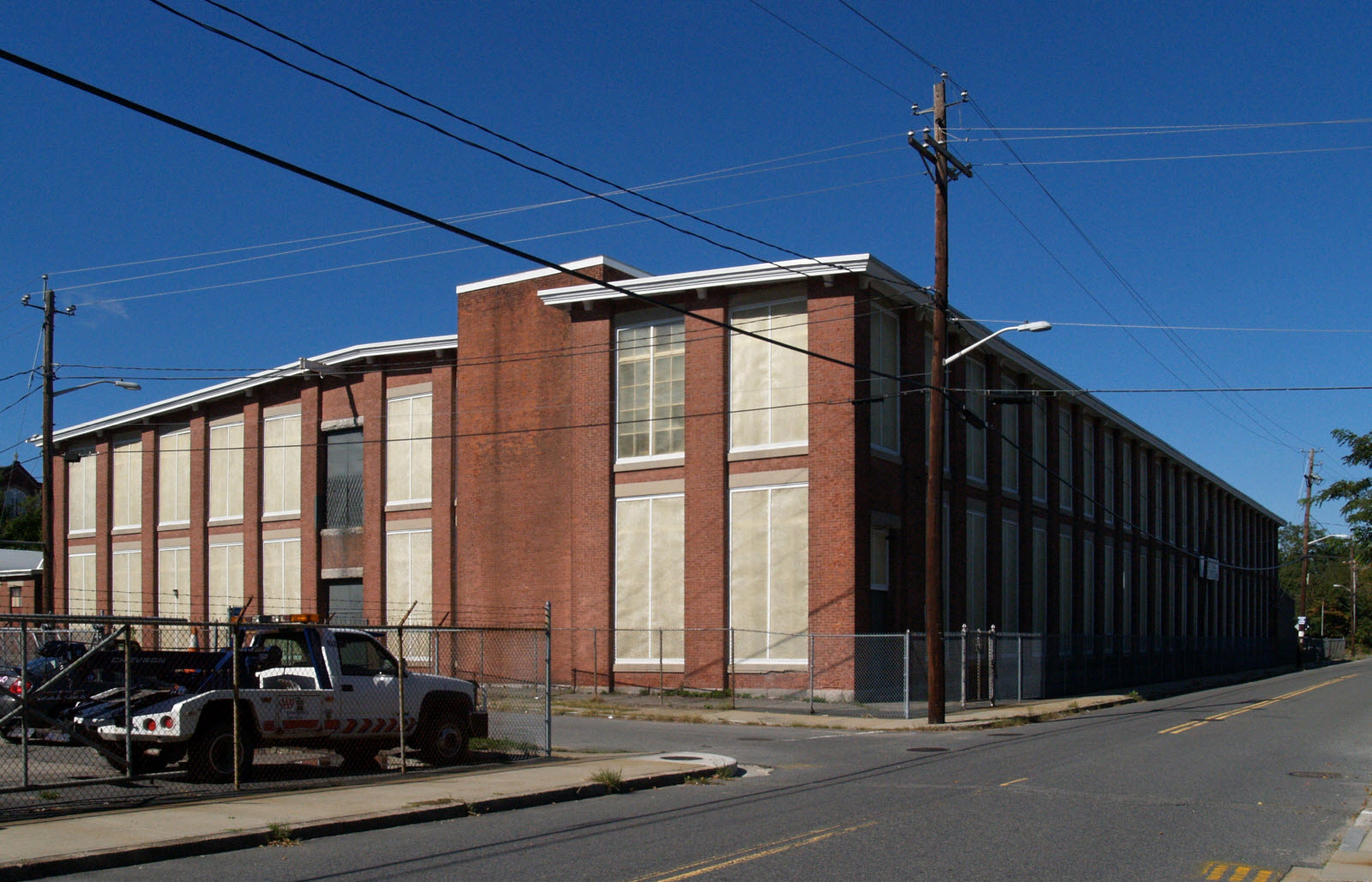

- Location within Massachusetts Location within the United States
- Location: Fall River, Massachusetts
- Coordinates: 41°43′27″N 71°8′49″W
- Built: 1916
- MPS: Fall River MRA
- NRHP reference No.: 83000670
- Added to NRHP: February 16, 1983

Foster Spinning Co. is an historic textile mill on Cove Street in Fall River, Massachusetts. The mill was built in 1916 from red brick and had a capacity of 13,312 spindles when built. It was the last new textile mill built in Fall River. Its buildings are not particularly architecturally distinctive, representing typical early-20th century mill construction, but the complex is relatively complete, including the original main mill, boiler house, smokestack, and wooden storage building. In 1920 the plant was enlarged, increasing its capacity to 25,000 spindles. The Foster Spinning Company operated on the premises until 1962.

The property was added to the National Register of Historic Places in 1983.

== See also ==
- National Register of Historic Places listings in Fall River, Massachusetts
- List of mills in Fall River, Massachusetts
