= Quequechan Valley Mills Historic District =

Historic district in Massachusetts, United States

- U.S. National Register of Historic Places
- U.S. Historic district
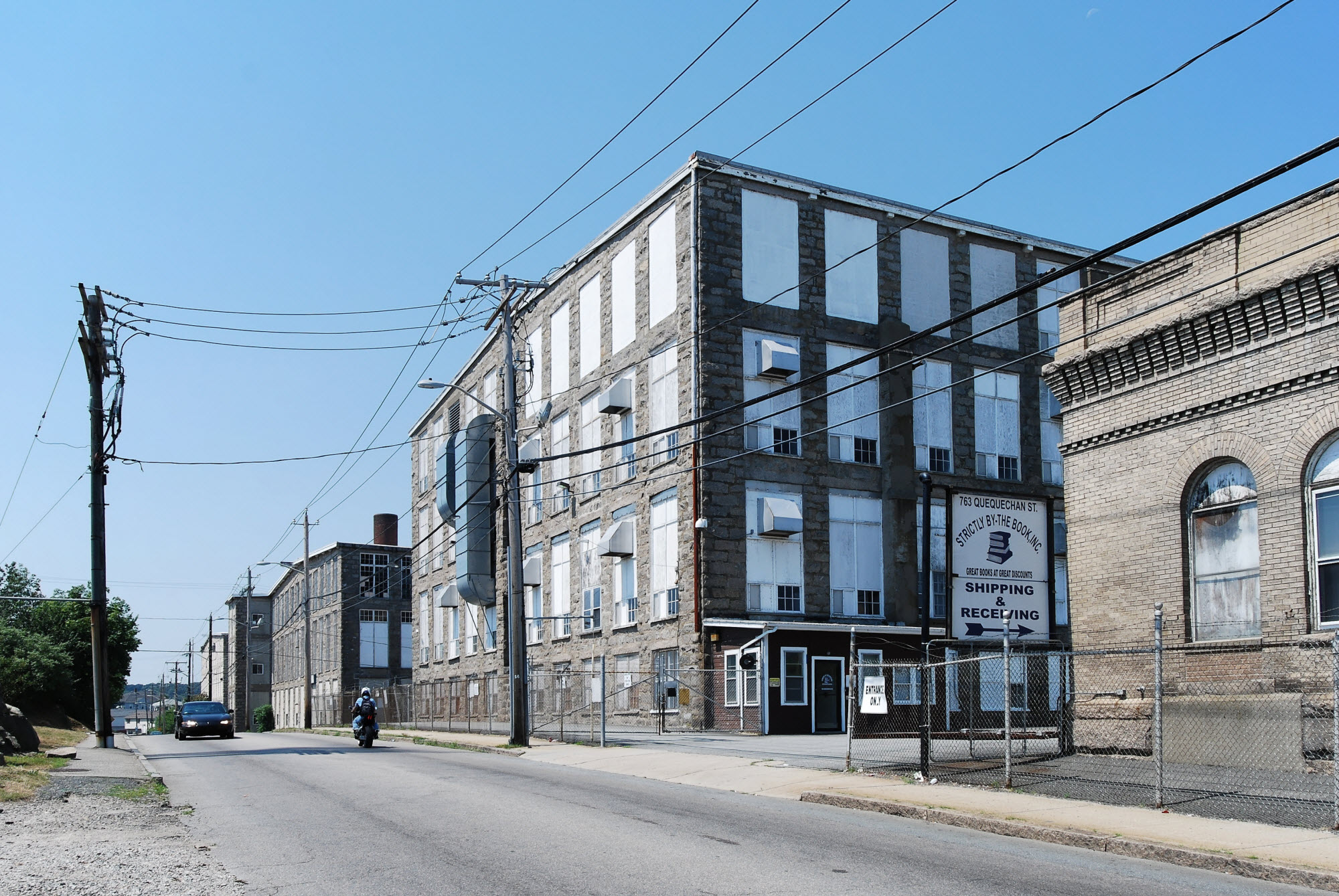
- Quequechan Street, with view of Arkwright and Davis Mills

- Location within Massachusetts Location within the United States
- Location: Fall River, Massachusetts
- Coordinates: 41°40′59″N 71°8′33″W
- Built: 1882
- Architect: Chauncey H. Sears
- MPS: Fall River MRA
- NRHP reference No.: 83000709
- Added to NRHP: February 16, 1983

Quequechan Valley Mills Historic District is a historic district located on Quequechan, Jefferson, and Stevens Streets between Interstate-195 and Denver Street in Fall River, Massachusetts. The district was added to the National Register of Historic Places in 1983.

== History ==
The Quequechan Valley Mills Historic District represents the last major area of textile mills developed in Fall River from the late 1890s into the early 1900s. The mills here are typically much wider than those built in other parts of the city during the 1870s.

In 2009 and 2010, three of the mills in the district were demolished to make way for commercial development, including Hargraves Mill No. 2 (formerly Quaker Fabric), Parker Mills and Barnaby Mills (formerly Frito-Lay and Quality Outlets).

== Mills ==
The contributing properties include:

- Arkwright Mill No. 1 (1897); with detached mill office
- Barnaby Mills (1893); (demolished 2010)
- Davis Mills No. 1 & 2 (1902 & 1908); with detached mill office
- Hargraves Mill No. 2 (demolished 2009)
- Parker Mills (demolished 2009)
- Stevens Mills; two mills remain (two mills demolished in 2000s, one destroyed by fire in 1990s)

== See also ==
- Quequechan River
- National Register of Historic Places listings in Fall River, Massachusetts
- List of mills in Fall River, Massachusetts
