= Ashworth Brothers Mill =

- U.S. National Register of Historic Places
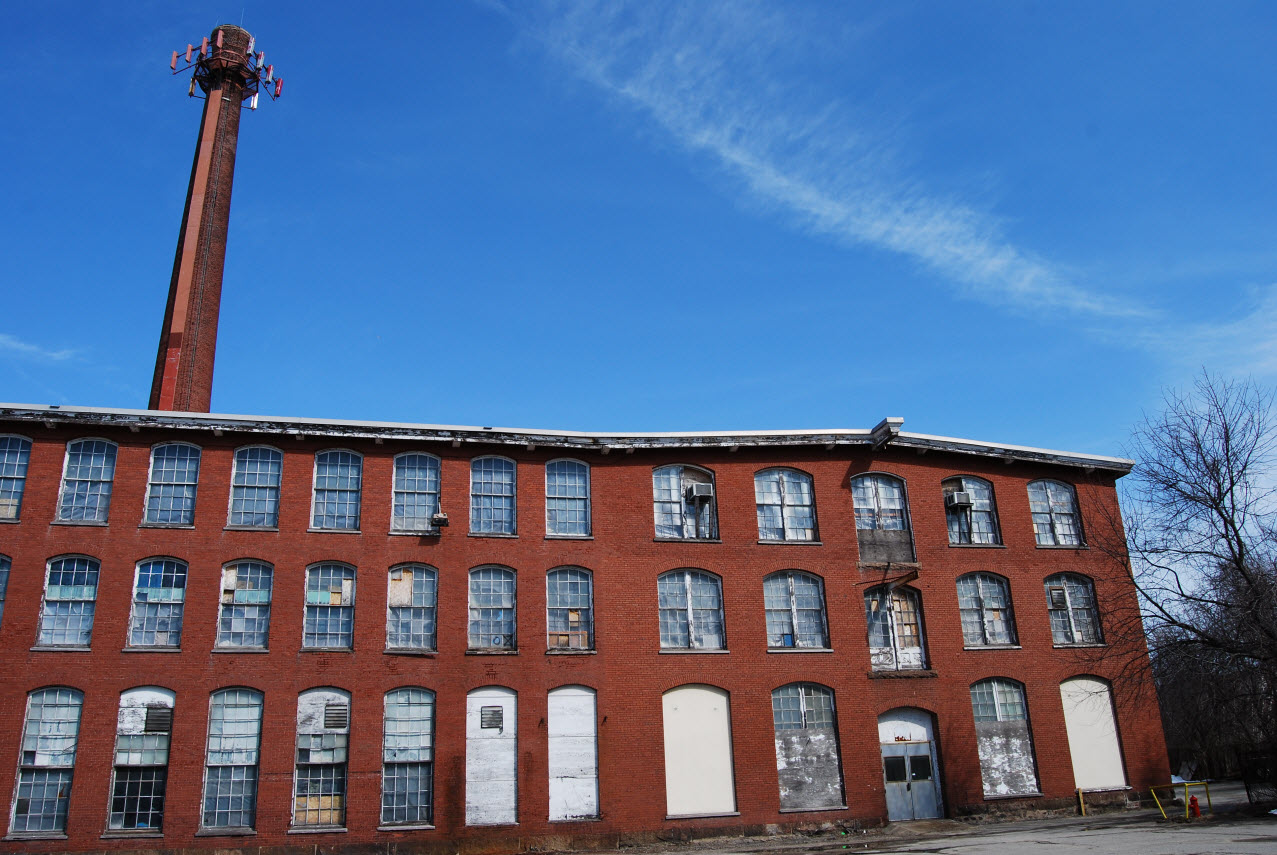

- Location within Massachusetts Location within the United States
- Location: 89 Globe Mills Ave., Fall River, Massachusetts
- Coordinates: 41°41′33″N 71°10′45″W
- MPS: Fall River MRA
- NRHP reference No.: 100009284
- Added to NRHP: August 21, 2023

Ashworth Brothers Mill is an historic mill complex located on Globe Mills Avenue in Fall River, Massachusetts. The mill was constructed for the manufacture of textile carding machinery. The site was determined eligible for the National Historic Register in 1983, but omitted due to owner's objection. It was listed in 2023 following a subsequent owner rescinding the objection and seeking listing to qualify for Federal Rehabilitation Investment Tax Credits.

== See also ==
- National Register of Historic Places listings in Fall River, Massachusetts
- List of mills in Fall River, Massachusetts
