= Charlton Mill =

Historic textile mill in Massachusetts, US

- U.S. National Register of Historic Places
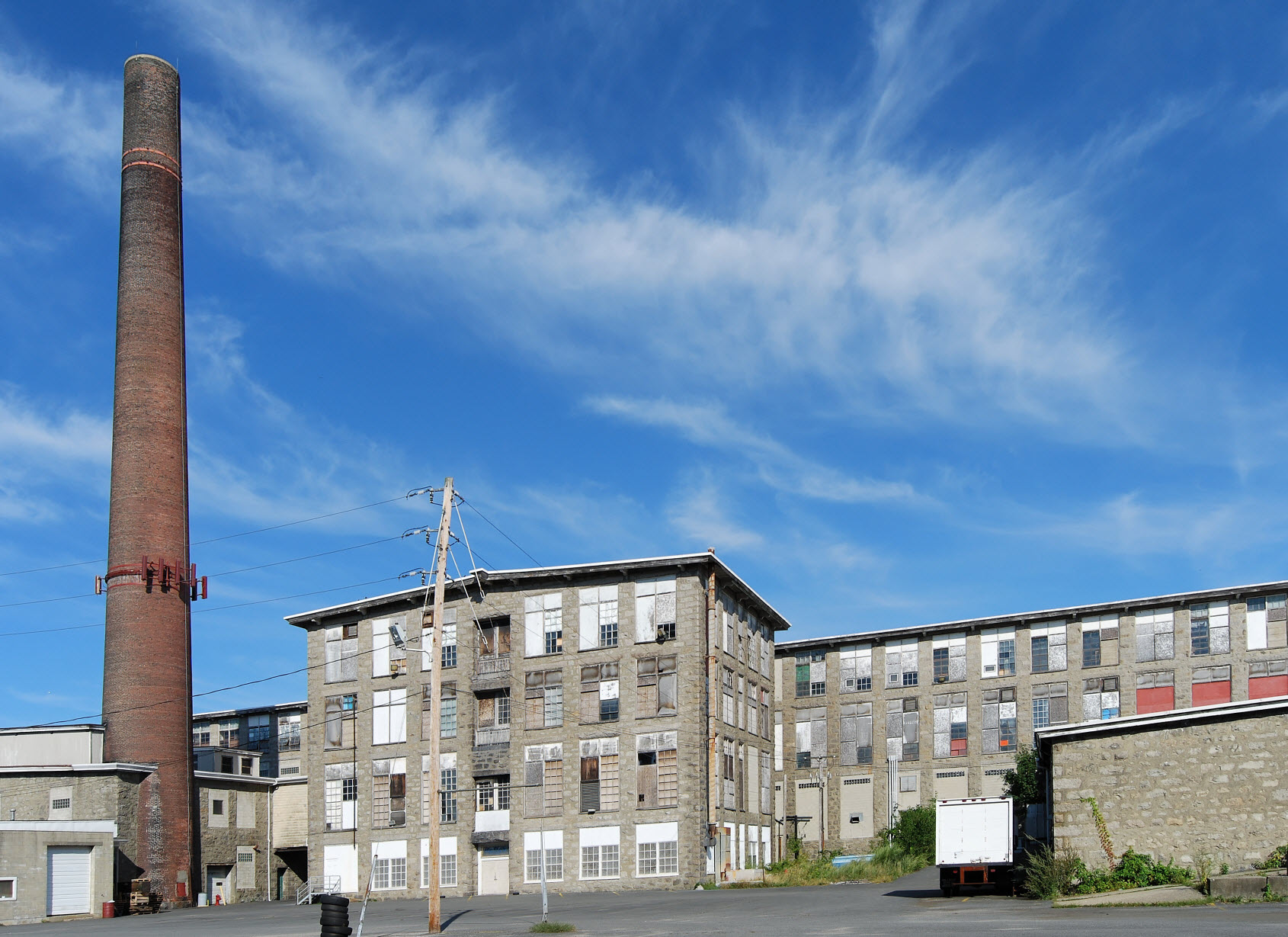

- Location within Massachusetts Location within the United States
- Location: 109 Howe St., Fall River, Massachusetts
- Coordinates: 41°40′43″N 71°10′38″W
- Built: 1911
- MPS: Fall River MRA
- NRHP reference No.: 83000650
- Added to NRHP: February 16, 1983

Charlton Mill is a historic textile mill at 109 Howe Street in Fall River, Massachusetts. Built in 1911, it is the last of the city's stone mill buildings to be built, and the first to feature the dual sources of steam and electrical power. The mill was added to the National Register of Historic Places in 1983.

== Description and history ==
The Charlton Mill stands in southern Fall River, on the west side of Cook Pond, south of the junction of Howe and Crawford Streets. The three-story mill measures 374 feet (114 m) long and 154 feet (47 m) wide. Smaller surviving buildings on the site include a boiler house, engine house and storage building. The building was originally powered by a 1,500 horsepower reciprocating steam engine and an 850-horsepower low steam turbine. The company also built a large one story weave shed to the north of the main mill (since demolished). Early plans included a second spinning mill to be located to the west of Mill No. 1, that was never built.

The Charlton Mill was the last granite mill constructed in the city. It was built in 1911, with Earl P. Charlton, its principal investor, as president. Charlton was a successful businessman who had established a chain of 53 five and dime stores, and in 1912 became a co-founder of the F.W. Woolworth Company. Its main building provides a marked architectural contrast to earlier mills built in Fall River by its extreme width and large windows. By 1917, it contained 55,992 spindles and 1,300 looms, for the manufacture of fine and fancy cotton goods. The company was sold in 1938, and the facility remained in textile production at least into the 1980s.

== See also ==
- National Register of Historic Places listings in Fall River, Massachusetts
- List of mills in Fall River, Massachusetts
