= List of mills in Fall River, Massachusetts =

The city of Fall River, Massachusetts once had over 120 cotton textile mills and was the leading cotton textile center in the United States during the late 19th century and early 20th century. There are currently about 65 historic textile mills remaining in the city, as well as other related structures. Many have been added to the National Register of Historic Places.

== Existing historic textile mills ==
Ref#	Name	Image	Built	Location	Construction	NRHP Listing	Notes/current use/references
1	Algonquin Printing Company		1891	Middle Street	red brick	83000615	October 2010 fire. Main mill saved.
2	American Printing Company Mill No.7		1906	Anawan Street	red brick	83000617	Built over falls of Quequechan River; site of Anawan Mill (also known as Iron Works Cotton Mill #7)
3	Arkwright Mill No. 1		1897	537 Quequechan	Fall River Granite	83000709	part of Quequechan Valley Mills Historic District
4	Barnard Mills		1874	Quarry Street	Fall River Granite	83000623	now "Tower Mill Outlet"
5	Barnard Mills Weave Shed		1896	Quarry Street	Fall River Granite	83000623	attached to main mill
6	Border City Mill No. 1		1880	1 West Street	red brick		Replaced original 1872 mill that burned in 1877. Eligible for the NRHP (listing 83004614) but not listed.
7	Border City Mill No. 2		1873	Weaver Street	red brick	90000999	Converted into apartments in 1980s
8	Bourne Mill		1881	State Avenue	Fall River Granite	06001189	located in Tiverton, RI; converted into residences
9	Chace Mills		1872	Lewiston Street	Fall River Granite	83000648	formerly Arkwright; weave shed burned 1999, main mill saved
10	Charlton Mill		1910	Howe Street	Fall River Granite	83000650	Weave shed demolished. Last granite mill to be built in the city
11	Conanicut Weave Mill		1904	Shaw Street	Red Brick		
12	Cornell Mill		1889	Alden Street	Fall River Granite	83000659	
13	Crescent Mill		1871	54 Front St	Fall River Granite	83000659	a.k.a. Merchants Mill No. 2 (1893)
14	Davis Mill No. 1		1902	749 Quequechan	Fall River Granite	83000709	part of Quequechan Valley Mills Historic District; current tenant: EC Pigments LLC
15	Davis Mill No. 2		1908	661 Quequechan	Fall River Granite	83000709	part of Quequechan Valley Mills Historic District
16	Davol Mill No. 1		1871	427 Plymouth Ave	Red Brick		Built in the Second Empire Style
17	Davol Mill No. 2		1867	427 Plymouth Ave	Red Brick		Built in the Second Empire Style
18	Durfee Mill No. 1		1866	Pleasant Street	Fall River Granite	83000664	largest remaining complex in city
19	Durfee Mill No. 2		1871	Pleasant Street	Fall River Granite	83000664	largest remaining complex in city
20	Durfee Mill No. 3		1881	Pleasant Street	Fall River Granite	83000664	largest remaining complex in city
21	Durfee Weave Mill		1893	Pleasant Street	Fall River Granite	83000664	largest remaining complex in city
22	Fall River Bleachery		1872	Jefferson Street	Fall River Granite	83000667	(portion burned October 30, 1967)
23	Fall River Merino Mills		1875	Alden Street	red brick		later occupied by Cote Piano Company
24	Flint Mills No. 1		1882	Alden Street	Fall River Granite	83000669	1872 tower mill burned on October 28, 1882, rebuilt without tower.
25	Flint Mills No. 2		1909	Alden Street	Fall River Granite	83000669	
26	Foster Spinning Co.		1916	Cove Street	Red Brick	83000670	acquired by Fall River Florist Supply in 1962
27	Globe Yarn Mills No. 1		1881	206 Globe Mills Ave	Red Brick		later part of New England Cotton Yarns; Passaic Coton Mills; now part of Duro Industries
28	Globe Yarn Mills No. 2		1885	460 Globe St	Red Brick	83000671	
29	Globe Yarn Mills No. 3		1893	Griffin St	Red Brick	83000671	
30	Granite Mill No. 2		1871	Bedford Street	Fall River Granite	83004610	formerly Anderson Little, Pepperell Mills
31	Granite Mill No. 3		1893	Bedford Street	Fall River Granite	83004610	formerly Globe Mfg. (modified)
32	Hargraves Mill No. 1		1888	Quarry Street	Fall River Granite	83000675	formerly Quaker Fabric; a.k.a. Parker "C" mills
33	Heywood Narrow Fabric Co.		1890	275 Martine St	Red Brick		Has been renovated and is occupied by various businesses
34	King Philip Mill No. 1		1871	Kilburn Street	Fall River Granite	83000687	later part of Berkshire Fine Spinning Associates; Mill office/proofing building destroyed by fire January 3, 2012. Mill No. 1 condemned by city for fire safety violations.
35	King Philip Mill No. 2		1881	Kilburn Street	Fall River Granite	83000687	later part of Berkshire Fine Spinning Associates; Mill office/proofing building destroyed by fire January 3, 2012. Mill No. 2 condemned by city for fire safety violations.
36	King Philip Mill No. 3		1888	Kilburn Street	Red Brick	83000687	later part of Berkshire Fine Spinning Associates; Korber Hats
37	Laurel Lake Mill No. 1		1881	Broadway	Fall River Granite	83004612	
38	Laurel Lake Mill No. 2		1896	Broadway	Fall River Granite	83004612	
39	Mechanics Mill		1868	Davol Street	red brick	83000693	first mill constructed north of the city center. One of the former Quaker plants. Currently being converted to Commonwealth Landing.
40	Metacomet Mill		1847	Anawan Street	Fall River Granite	83000617	a.k.a. Iron Works Mill #6; Oldest Remaining cloth-producing mill in City
41	Narragansett Mill No.1		1872	North Main St.	Red Brick	83000694	now medical offices
42	Narragansett Mill No.2		1882	North Main St.	Red Brick	83000694	Second floor of mill is currently being removed
43	Pilgrim Mills		1910	Pleasant Street	Red Brick	83000704	first fully electric-powered mill in city; formerly Louis Hand Mfg
44	Richard Borden Mill No. 2		1889	Plymouth Ave	Fall River Granite		Currently Carter's, Billiards, Lazergate and others.
45	Sagamore Mill No. 1		1888	140 Ace St.	Red Brick	83000713	Replaced original 1872 mill destroyed by fire in 1884
46	Sagamore Mill No. 2		1881	1822 North Main Street	Fall River Granite	83000712	formerly Joan Fabrics
47	Sagamore Mill No. 3		1882	1 Ace St.	Fall River Granite	83000713	formerly Trina
48	Sanford Spinning Co. Mill No. 1		1891	Globe Mills Ave	Red Brick	83000714	later part of New England Cotton Yarns; Passaic Coton Mills; American Cotton Fabric Corporation; Firestone Cotton Mills; now part of Duro Industries
49	Seaconnet Mills No. 1		1884	21 Fr. Devalles Blvd	Fall River Granite	83000716	now known as Clover Leaf Office Park and Erin Rae's School of Dance
50	Seaconnet Mills No. 2		1895	1 Fr. Devalles Blvd	Fall River Granite	83000716	formerly Bristol Probate and Family Court; office park
51	Shove Mills No. 1		1874	126 Shove St	Fall River Granite		Formerly Nira. Top three floors of mill and tower burnt in the October 16, 1946 fire and were removed.
52	Shove Mills Weave Shed		1897	Shove St	Fall River Granite		
53	Stafford Mill No. 1		1872	County Street	Fall River Granite	83000718	attached weave shed
54	Stafford Mill No. 2		1886	County Street	Fall River Granite	83000718	
55	Stafford Weave Mill		1900	County Street	Fall River Granite	83000718	Attached to Mill No. 1
56	Stevens Manufacturing Spinning Mill No. 2		1901	Stevens Street	Red Brick	83000709	remaining portion; part of Quequechan Valley Mills Historic District
57	Stevens Manufacturing Weave Mill No. 2		1901	Stevens Street	Red Brick	83000709	building closest to highway; part of Quequechan Valley Mills Historic District
58	Tecumseh Mill No. 1		1866	Hartwell Street	Fall River Granite		converted into apartments in 1980s
59	Union Mill No. 1		1859	Pleasant Street	Fall River Granite	83000726	now PrimaCare Medical Center
60	Union Mill No. 2		1865	Pleasant Street	Fall River Granite	83000726	formerly Nate Lyons, now PrimaCare Medical Center
61	Wampanoag Mill No. 1		1872	420 Quequechan Street	Fall River Granite	83000729	converted into residences known as The Curtain Lofts.
62	Wampanoag Mill No. 2		1877	69 Alden Street	Fall River Granite	83000729	formerly Fall River Knitting Mills. Parkers Candy building attached was destroyed in 2010 fire.
63	Wampanoag Weave Mill		1887	Quequechan Street	Fall River Granite	83000729	attached to Mill No. 1
64	Wyoming Mills		1845	110 Chace St	Fieldstone	83004613	part of Marshall Hat complex; now Duro

== Other existing historic manufacturing mills ==
Ref#	Name	Image	Built	Location	Construction	NRHP Listing	Notes/current use/references
1	Ashworth Brothers Mill Complex		1910	Globe Mills Ave	Red Brick		manufactured card clothing
2	Borden & Remmington (original plant)			Anawan Street	Red Brick		
3	Cote Piano Manufacturing Company		abt. 1910	Alden Street	Red Brick		L-shaped expansion of former Merino Company site
4	Fall River Bobbin & Shuttle Company			Cambridge Street	Red Brick		acquired by United States Bobbin & Shuttle Company in 1899
5	Marshall Hat Company		1890s	Chace St	Red Brick	83004613	part of Marshall Hat complex; now Duro
6	Textile Paper Tube Company		1901	Globe St	Red Brick		Now known as Tuscan Building. Painted yellow.
7	Union Belt Company		1871	Troy Street	Red Brick		built by the Troy Mills and leased to Union Belt Company for the manufacture of leather belts for textile machinery. Roof was damaged in Hurricane Sandy
8	Webster Loom Harness Company		1923	Eleventh Street	Red Brick		Company founded in 1890s, originally located at 209 Bedford Street. Building more recently occupied by Norbut Manufacturing.
9	Westport Manufacturing Company Storehouse		1919	7 Oregon Street	Red Brick		Later occupied by Smith Textile Waste Company

== Other existing notable mill related structures ==
Ref#	Name	Image	Built	Location	Construction	NRHP Listing	Notes/current use/references
1	Algonquin Mills Office			Bay Street			
2	American Linen Co. Cotton Store House		1860s	Ferry Street	Field Stone		
3	American Printing Co. Electric Plant		1922	Water Street	Red Brick		
4	American Printing Co. Storehouse (lower)		1880s	Anawan Street	Red Brick		Currently Narrows Center for the Arts and others.
5	American Printing Co. Storehouse (middle)		1880s	Anawan Street	Red Brick		
6	American Printing Co. Storehouse (upper)		1903	Anawan Street	Red Brick		
7	American Printing Co. Machine & Carpentry Shop		1890s	Water Street	Red Brick		Occupied by the Marine Museum at Fall River
8	Arkwright Mills Office		1897	Quequechan Street	Yellow Brick & Granite		Part of Quequechan Valley Mills Historic District
9	Bradford Durfee Textile School		1899	Durfee St	Gray Stone		former textile school opened in 1904, later merged with Umass Dartmouth
10	Davis Mills Office		1902	Quequechan Street	Yellow Brick & Granite		Part of Quequechan Valley Mills Historic District
11	Durfee Mills Cloth Hall and Repair Shop		1895	Pleasant Street	Fall River Granite	83000664	largest remaining complex in city
12	Durfee Mills Cotton Store House		1887	Pleasant Street	Fall River Granite	83000664	largest remaining complex in city; now occupied by 99 Restaurant
13	Fall River Bleachery Storage Building		1919	Jefferson Street	Red Brick		
14	Flint Mills Office		1880s	Alden Street	Fall River Granite		
15	Laurel Lake Mills Office			482 Globe Street	yellow brick		formerly the Ukrainian National Home and then "The Uke" restaurant
16	Narragansett Mills Office			North Main Street	Red Brick		
17	Oliver Chace's Thread Mill		1838	505 Bay Street	Field Stone	83000649	Part of a larger mill building that has since been demolished, later part of Conanicut Mills (NRHP listed)
18	Osborn Mill Store House		1872	Montaup Street	Fall River Granite		
19	Stafford Mills Office		1890s	County Street	Red Brick	83000718	
20	Stevens Mfg. Co. Boiler Room		1901	168 Stevens Street	Red Brick		smokestack is located next to this building

== Non-extant mills ==
Ref#	Name	Image	Built	Destroyed	Location	Construction	Notes/references
1	American Linen Company Mill No.1		1852	1940s	Ferry Street	Fall River granite	Switched to print cloth production in 1858. Closed in 1929. demolished in 1940s for J&J Corrugated Box Company (later part of Quaker Fabric)
2	American Linen Company Mill No.2		1866	1940s	Ferry Street	Fall River granite	Fire June 29, 1876 damaged upper stories, pitched roof converted to flat roof in rebuild; demolished in 1940s for J&J Corrugated Box Company (later part of Quaker Fabric)
3	American Print Works original complex		1835	1867	Water Street		original complex begun in 1835 and expanded until 1867, when it was destroyed by fire which began in the old wooden portion, just prior to the opening of a new granite print works;
4	American Print Works rebuilt complex		1869	1941	Water Street	Fall River granite	mill destroyed by fire on October 11–12, 1941; as part of Firestone Rubber Complex
5	Anawan Mill (first mill)		1825	1888	Anawan Street	Red brick	built by the Fall River Iron Works; mill struck by lightning and destroyed by fire in 1888
6	Anawan Mill (replacement)		1888	1905	Anawan Street	Red brick	mill destroyed by fire, rebuilt, demolished in 1905 for APC Mill #7
7	Barnaby Manufacturing Co. main mill		1882	2010	Quequechan St	Fall River granite	sold to Shawmut Mills (1917); later Frito-Lay; Quality Outlets; demolished for new retail development
8	Barnaby Manufacturing Co. weave mill		1882	2010	Quequechan St	Fall River granite	sold to Shawmut Mills (1917); later Frito-Lay; Quality Outlets; demolished for new retail development
9	Bay State Print Works			1867	Globe Street		(a.k.a. Tiverton Print Works) site of Globe Yarn Mills; destroyed by fire, 1867
10	Border City Mill No. 1 (original)		1872	1877	Ace Street	red brick	destroyed by fire, rebuilt in 1880
11	Border City Mill No. 3		1888	2016	Weaver Street	red brick	mixed industrial, Burned on February 20, 2016
12	Bourne Mills Weave Shed		1900	2009	State Avenue	Fall River granite	abandoned for many years; ruins demolished as part of rehab project
13	Chace Mill No. 2		1895	1999	Lewiston Street	Fall River granite	310' x 120' x 2 stories; burned in 1999
14	Charlton Mill Weave Shed				Howe Street	Fall River granite	demolished
15	Conanicut Mills		1840		Shaw Street	Field stone	Mill closed in 1926, weave mill remains. Previously known as Mount Hope Mill and Oliver Chase Thread Mill.
16	Estes Mill		1852	1940	Sucker Brook	Fall River granite	destroyed by fire on June 7, 1940. Located near Fall River Bleachery.
17	Fall River Manufactory (first mill)		1813	1839	Anawan Street	Fall River granite	Also known as the "Yellow Mill"; The first successful mill in Fall River, begun operation in October 1813, expanded in 1827, demolished in 1839
18	Fall River Manufactory (second mill)		1839	1868	Anawan Street	Fall River granite	Also known as the "White Mill"; destroyed by fire in 1868;
19	Fall River Manufactory (third mill)		1869	1961	Anawan Street	Fall River granite	later part of Pocasset Manufacturing Company as Mill #5; destroyed by fire in August 1961 - was scheduled to be demolished for I-195
20	Flint Mill No. 1 (original)		1872	1882	Alden Street	Fall River Granite	destroyed by fire on October 28, 1882, rebuilt without tower.
21	Globe Manufactory		1838	1927	Kelley Park (former Slade pond)	Field stone	first textile mill in city organized by Colonel Joseph Durfee, never very successful. Original 1811 wooden mill destroyed by fire in 1838. The replacement stone structure pictured at left was often called the "first mill in Fall River". It was demolished in 1927.
22	Granite Mill No. 1 (original)		1866	1874	13th Street	Fall River granite	destroyed by fire on September 19, 1874, killing 23 workers and injuring 33; mill was soon rebuilt
23	Granite Mill No. 1 (replacement)		1875	1961	13th Street	Fall River granite	replacement mill constructed with a flat roof; demolished for a supermarket which later became China Royal restaurant. Currently the site of Boston Market and CVS.
24	Hargraves Mill No. 2 (Building #1)		1891	2009	Brayton Ave	Fall River granite	formerly Quaker Fabric Main Plant; demolished, March 2009
25	Hargraves Mill No. 2 (Building #2)		1891	2009	Brayton Ave	Fall River granite with red brick addition	formerly Quaker Fabric Main Plant; demolished, March 2009
26	Iron Works Cotton Mill No.1		1889	2011	Water Street	Red brick	demolished, May 2011
27	Iron Works Cotton Mill No. 2		1892	1973	Water Street	Red brick	destroyed by fire on March 9, 1973
28	Iron Works Cotton Mill No. 3		1893	2008	Water Street	Red brick	demolished, October 2008
29	Iron Works Cotton Mill No. 4		1894	1941	Water Street	Red brick	destroyed by fire on October 11–12, 1941; as part of Firestone Rubber Complex
30	Iron Works Cotton Mill No. 5		1902	1941	Water Street	Red brick	destroyed by fire on October 11–12, 1941; as part of Firestone Rubber Complex
31	Kerr Thread Mill No.1		1890	1987	Martine Street	Red brick	enlarged in 1893; became American Thread Co. in 1897; destroyed by fire January 12, 1987 (was home to the Kerr Mill Outlet store)
32	Kerr Thread Mill No.2		1907	1987	Martine Street	Red brick	built by the American Thread Co.; destroyed by fire January 12, 1987 (the fire began in this building)
33	Kerr Thread Mill No.3		after 1916	1987	Martine Street	Reinforced concrete	built by the American Thread Co.; destroyed by fire January 12, 1987
34	King Philip Mill No. 4		1892	2018	Dwelly Street	Fall River Granite	Demolished as part of a project to make 26 single family houses July 2018.
35	Lincoln Manufacturing Co. Mill No.1		1907	1950s	Jefferson Street	Fall River granite	taken over by the General Cotton Supply Corporation in 1938; demolished; Swan Finishing later built on this site.
36	Lincoln Manufacturing Co. Mill No.2		1912	1950s	Jefferson Street	Fall River granite	taken over by the General Cotton Supply Corporation in 1938; demolished; Swan Finishing later built on this site.
37	Lincoln Manufacturing Co. Weave Shed		1907	1950s	Jefferson Street	Fall River granite	taken over by the General Cotton Supply Corporation in 1938; demolished; Swan Finishing later built on this site.
38	Massasoit Steam Mill		1846	1960s	Davol Street	Fall River granite	First steam mill in city, sold to Massasoit Manufacturing Co. Converted to cotton waste plant.
39	Merchants Mill		1866	1934	Pleasant Street	Fall River granite	Destroyed by fire on January 29, 1934. Was one of the largest mill buildings in the city.
40	Montaup Mill		1871	1940	Cook Pond	red brick	became Osborn Mill #2 in 1886; destroyed by fire March 25, 1940
41	Osborn Mill No. 1		1872	1950s	Montaup Street	Fall River granite	mill did not burn in the 1940 fire. Demolished by the mid-1950s.
42	Parker Mill		1895	2009	Jefferson Street	Fall River granite	later part of Berkshire Fine Spinning Associates, demolished, March 2009
43	Pocasset MFG Co. "Bridge Mill"		1822	1843	Pocasset Street		original L-shaped mill, destroyed in Great Fire of 1843; Granite Block built in this location
44	Pocasset MFG Co. "Satinet Mill"		1825	1846	Pocasset Street		demolished for 1846 mill
45	Pocasset MFG Co. "Quequechan Mill"		1826	abt. 1880	Pocasset Street		also known as "New Pocasset"; demolished for Mills No. 2 and 3.
46	Pocasset MFG Co. Mill No. 1		1846	1928	Pocasset Street	Fall River granite	original mill built 1821, burned, rebuilt in 1842; destroyed by fire in 1928 (origin of Great Fall River Fire of 1928)
47	Pocasset MFG Co. Mill No. 2		about 1880	1928	Pocasset Street	Fall River granite	original mill built 1821, burned, rebuilt in 1842; destroyed by fire in 1928 (origin of Great Fall River Fire of 1928)
48	Pocasset MFG Co. Mill No. 3		about 1880	1928	Pocasset Street	Fall River granite	original mill built 1821, burned, rebuilt in 1842; destroyed by fire in 1928 (origin of Great Fall River Fire of 1928)
49	Richard Borden Mill No. 1		1871	1981	Rodman Street	Fall River granite	double tower mill destroyed by fire November 5, 1981. Formerly Arlan's. (currently McDonald's, Sullivan Tire Co.)
50	Robeson Mill No. 1		1866	2001	Hartwell Street	Red brick	tower mill demolished in 2001; a.k.a. Luther Manufacturing Co. (1903) Currently Gas Station, Car Wash and Chinese restaurant.
51	Robeson Mill No. 2		1903	ca. 1994	Hartwell Street	Fall River granite	constructed by Luther Manufacturing in 1903; demolished in 1990s; site of Walgreens & Applebee's
52	Robeson Print Works Mill No. 1		1827	1960s	Anawan Street		later known as Fall River Print Works; later known as Quequechan Manufacturing Company; also later part of Fall River Manufacturing Company; demolished for I-195
53	Robeson Print Works Mill No. 2		abt. 1830	1960s	Anawan Street		later known as Fall River Print Works; later known as Quequechan Manufacturing Company; also later part of Fall River Manufacturing Company; demolished for I-195
54	Robeson Print Works Mill No. 3		1836	1960s	Anawan Street		later known as Fall River Print Works; later known as Quequechan Manufacturing Company; also later part of Fall River Manufacturing Company; demolished for I-195
55	Sagamore Mill No. 1 (original)		1872	1884	North End	red brick	destroyed by fire in 1884, rebuilt in 1888
56	Sanford Spinning Co. Mill No. 2		1890	2005	Globe Mills Ave	red brick	Later part of Firestone Cotton Mills; demolished for new Kuss Middle School
57	Shove Mill No. 2		1881	1940	Cook Pond	Fall River granite	located just over the state line in Tiverton, Rhode Island. Originally three stories, only a portion of the first floor remains, and has been added on to.
58	Slade Mill		1871		Globe Street	Red brick	became Ancona, 1903; closed in 1927. Currently the Globe Fire Station is located on the site.
59	Small Brothers Manufacturing Company				Prospect Street	red Brick	Demolished by Charlton Memorial Hospital for parking
60	Standard Fabric Company				Portland Street		manufactured narrow goods; located along South Watuppa Pond, east of Heywood.
61	Stevens Manufacturing Spinning Mill No. 1		1892	2000s	Stevens Street	red brick	also known as packing and shipping building; demolished for new housing; (Bristol Finishing).
62	Stevens Manufacturing Weaving Mill No. 1		1892	2000s	Stevens Street	red brick	was closest building to Stevens Street; demolished for new housing
63	Stevens Manufacturing Bleach House		1892	1990s	Stevens Street	red brick	destroyed by fire in the mid 1990s (once part of Bristol Finishing)
64	Tecumseh Mill No. 2		1872	1990s	Rodman Street	Fall River granite	demolished in 1990s for Stop & Shop; formerly Mason's Furniture
65	Tecumseh Mill No. 3		1896	1990s	Rodman Street	Fall River granite	demolished in 1990s for Stop & Shop; formerly Mason's Furniture
66	Troy Cotton & Woolen Manufactory (First Mill)		1813	1821	Troy Street	field stone	second successful mill in Fall River; began operation in March 1814; burned in 1821
67	Troy Cotton & Woolen Manufactory (Replacement)		1823	1860	Troy Street	Fall River granite	demolished in 1860 for new mill
68	Troy Cotton & Woolen Manufactory "New" Mill No. 1		1843	1960s	Troy Street	Fall River granite	built 47'x75' in 1843, expanded 80' in 1853 and made 2 stories higher; tower later added and monitor roof extended/flattened to a full story
69	Troy Cotton & Woolen Manufactory; Mill No. 2		1860	1960s	Troy Street	Fall River granite	located north of Mill #1; demolished in 1960s for Interstate 195
70	Union Cotton Factory		1813	1838	Cook Pond	field stone	4th cotton mill in city; burned in 1838, site of Laurel Lake Mills
71	Union Mill No.3		1877	abt. 1965	Pleasant Street	red brick	demolished in 1960s for Interstate 195.
72	Union Mill No.4		1895	after 1966	Pleasant Street	red brick	built as an addition to Mill No. 2; demolished in 1960s for Interstate 195.
73	Wamsutta Steam Woolen Mill		1849	1961	Blossoms Lane	Fall River granite	first mill to be built "above the dam"; originally known as Jesse Eddy & Son; renamed Wamsutta in 1873; later owned by Massasoit Manufacturing Co.; Demolished for Interstate 195
74	Watuppa Mill		1826	1928	Anawan Street	Fall River granite	one of the eight original mills along the Quequechan Falls (a.k.a. Massasoit Mill); later part of Pocasset Mills as Mill #4 (burned in 1928)
75	Weetamoe Mill		1870	1940	Davol Street	red brick	destroyed by fire on February 6, 1940

== See also ==
- History of Fall River, Massachusetts
- List of mills in New Bedford, Massachusetts
- List of Registered Historic Places in Fall River, Massachusetts
- List of mills in Holyoke, Massachusetts
- List of mills in Oldham
