= Mechanics Mill =

- U.S. National Register of Historic Places
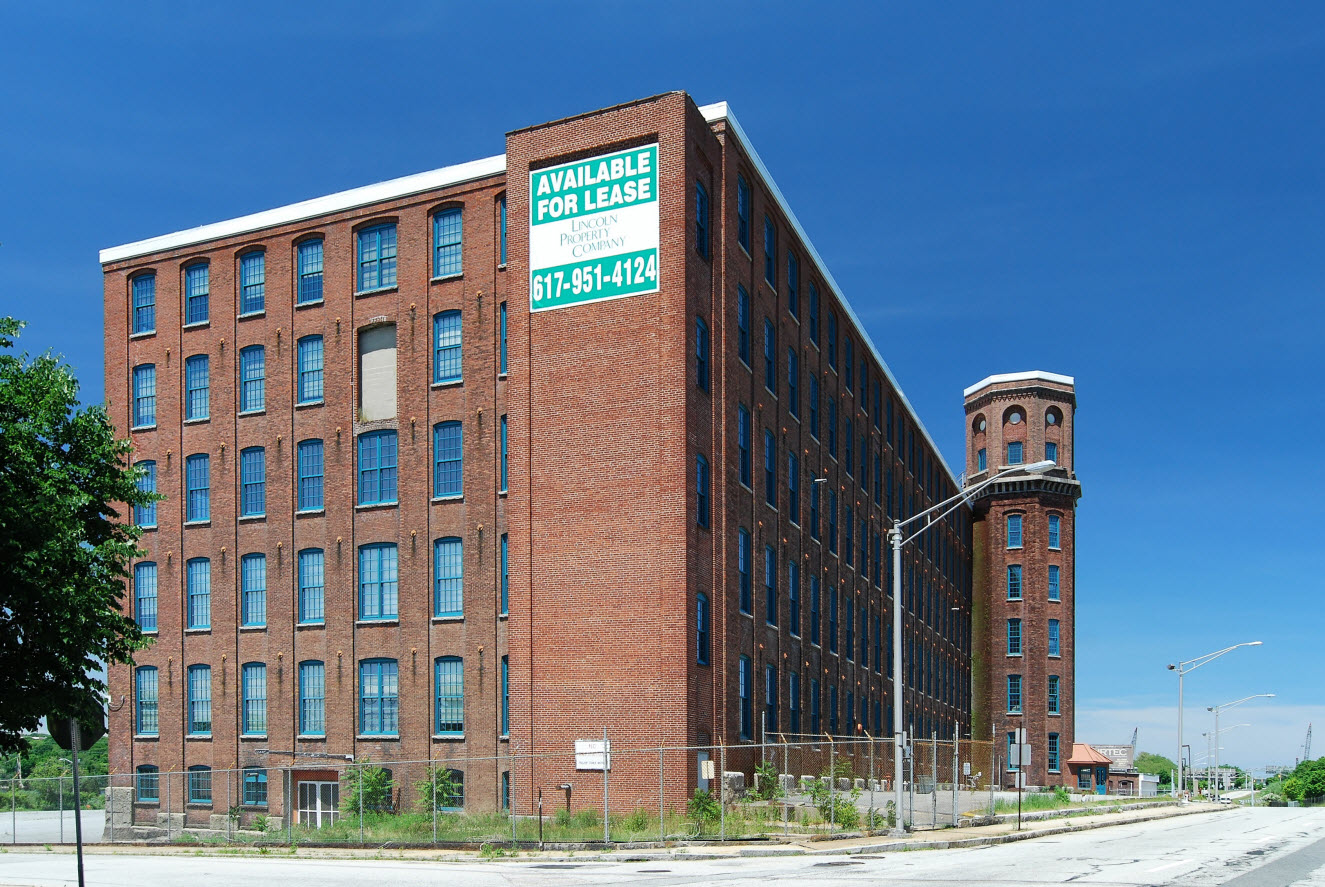
- Mechanics Mill in Fall River, Massachusetts

- Location within Massachusetts Location within the United States
- Location: Fall River, Massachusetts
- Coordinates: 41°43′7″N 71°9′21″W
- Built: 1868
- Architect: Dyer, Hartwell
- Architectural style: Second Empire
- MPS: Fall River MRA
- NRHP reference No.: 83000693
- Added to NRHP: February 16, 1983

Mechanics Mill is a historic cotton textile mill located at 1082 Davol Street in Fall River, Massachusetts. Built in 1868, the mill represents an important example of Second Empire industrial architecture and marks a significant shift in the city's corporate development patterns.

== Architecture and construction ==
The mill was constructed in the Italianate style in 1868 from red brick. The mill's octagonal tower originally had a highly decorative top, which has been removed. The mill office was once located in front of the mill along Davol Street, but has also been removed.

The mill was constructed north of the city center, along the waterfront, with a tidewater dock to receive coal shipments to feed its boilers. Water for the steam engines was obtained from a well shaft dug nearby. The Mechanics Mill was also one of the first in the city to have a fire sprinkler protection system.

== History ==
The Mechanics Mill company was incorporated on May 25, 1868, by a special charter granted by the Massachusetts Legislature. Thomas J. Borden served as the first president, and D.H. Dyer was treasurer. Along with Merchants Mill, established in 1867, the Mechanics Mill was formed by a large number of stockholders with limited means, marking a new trend in the city's corporate development. There were initially 328 stockholders, compared to a dozen or so with other mills at the time.

In 1929, the Mechanics Mill merged with the nearby Weetamoe Mill, but it was soon closed. It was later part of Quaker Fabric Corporation, which closed in 2007.

== Modern use ==
The mill experienced a rebirth in 2012 as Commonwealth Landing, including office space, several small stores and two restaurants, including Jerry Remy's Sports Bar & Grill, owned by Fall River native, former Boston Red Sox second baseman and current NESN sportscaster Jerry Remy.

The mill was added to the National Register of Historic Places in 1983.

== See also ==
- National Register of Historic Places listings in Fall River, Massachusetts
- List of mills in Fall River, Massachusetts
