= Oak Grove Cemetery (Fall River, Massachusetts) =

Historic rural cemetery in Bristol County

- U.S. National Register of Historic Places
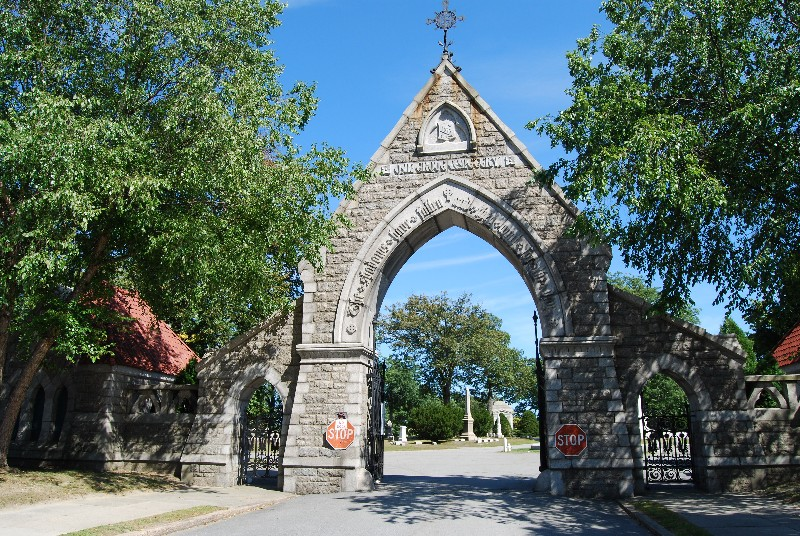
- Main entrance arch (1873)

- Location within Massachusetts Location within the United States
- Location: Fall River, Massachusetts
- Coordinates: 41°42′19″N 71°8′14″W
- Built: 1859
- Architect: Josiah Brown
- Architectural style: Gothic Revival
- MPS: Fall River MRA
- NRHP reference No.: 83000698
- Added to NRHP: February 16, 1983

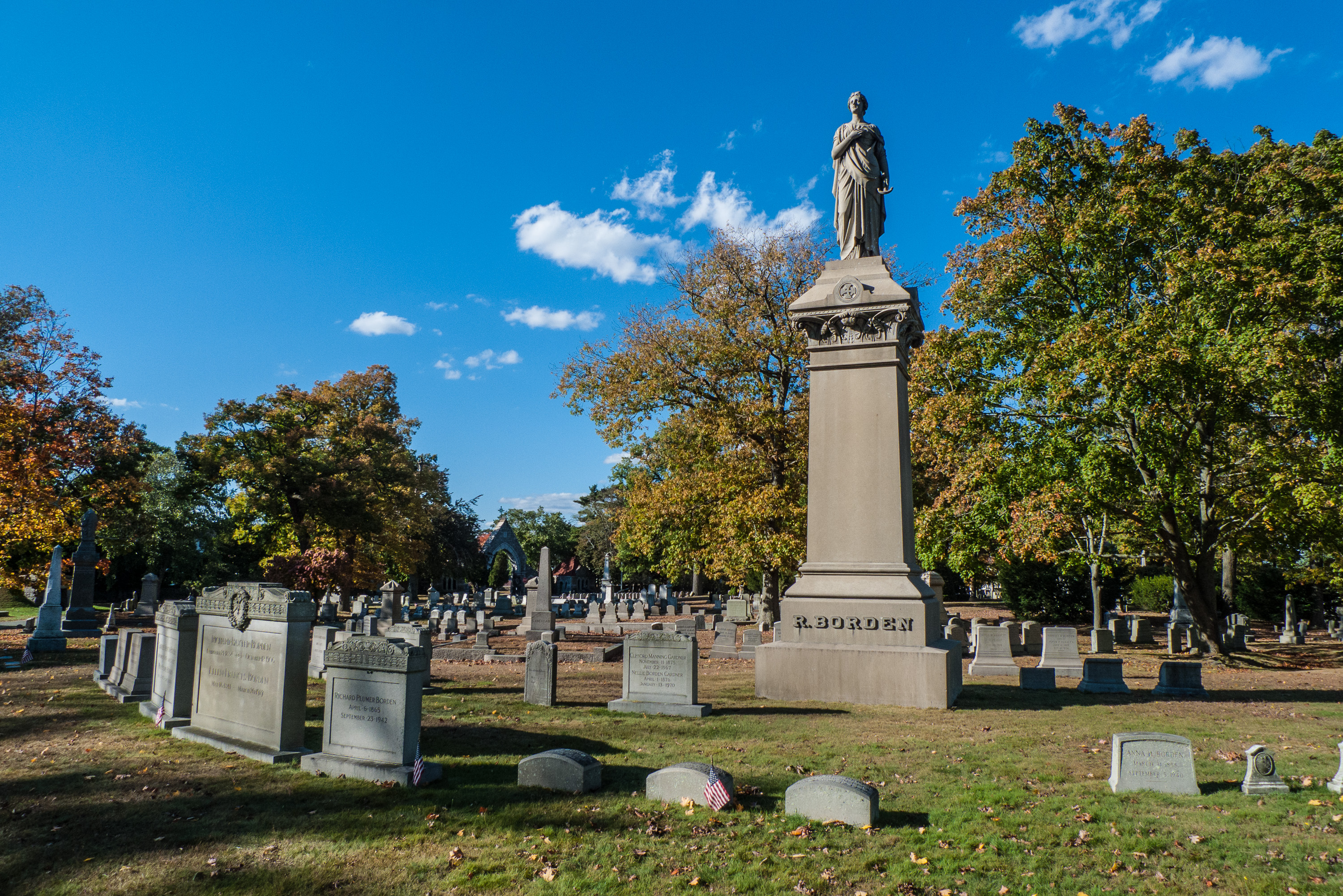
Many members of the locally prominent Borden family are buried at Oak Grove, including Richard Borden.

Oak Grove Cemetery is a historic cemetery located at 765 Prospect Street in Fall River, Massachusetts. It was established in 1855 and greatly improved upon in the years that followed. It features Gothic Revival elements, including an elaborate entrance arch constructed of locally quarried Fall River granite. The cemetery originally contained 47 acres, but has since been expanded to over 120 acres. The cemetery is the city's most significant, built in the planned rural-garden style of Mount Auburn Cemetery in Cambridge, Massachusetts. It was designed and laid out by local architect Josiah Brown, who is also known for his designs of early mills including the Union, Border City, and others.

Oak Grove Cemetery is the final resting place of many of the city's elite, including prominent mill owners and merchants. It also contains the city's Civil War Monument, donated by Richard Borden.

The cemetery was added to the National Register of Historic Places in 1983. It is still owned and operated by the City of Fall River.

== Notable burials ==
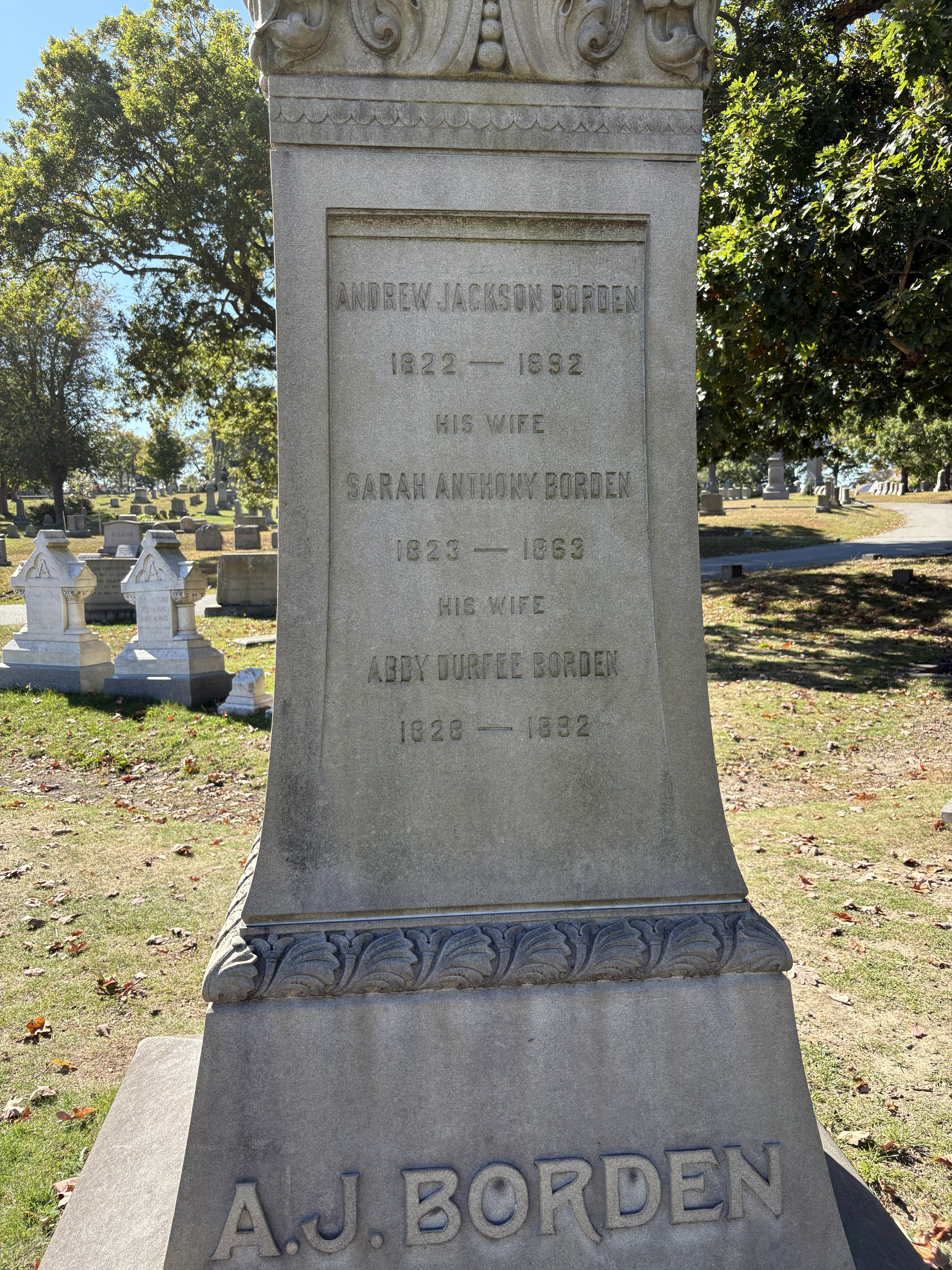
Gravestone of Borden Parents

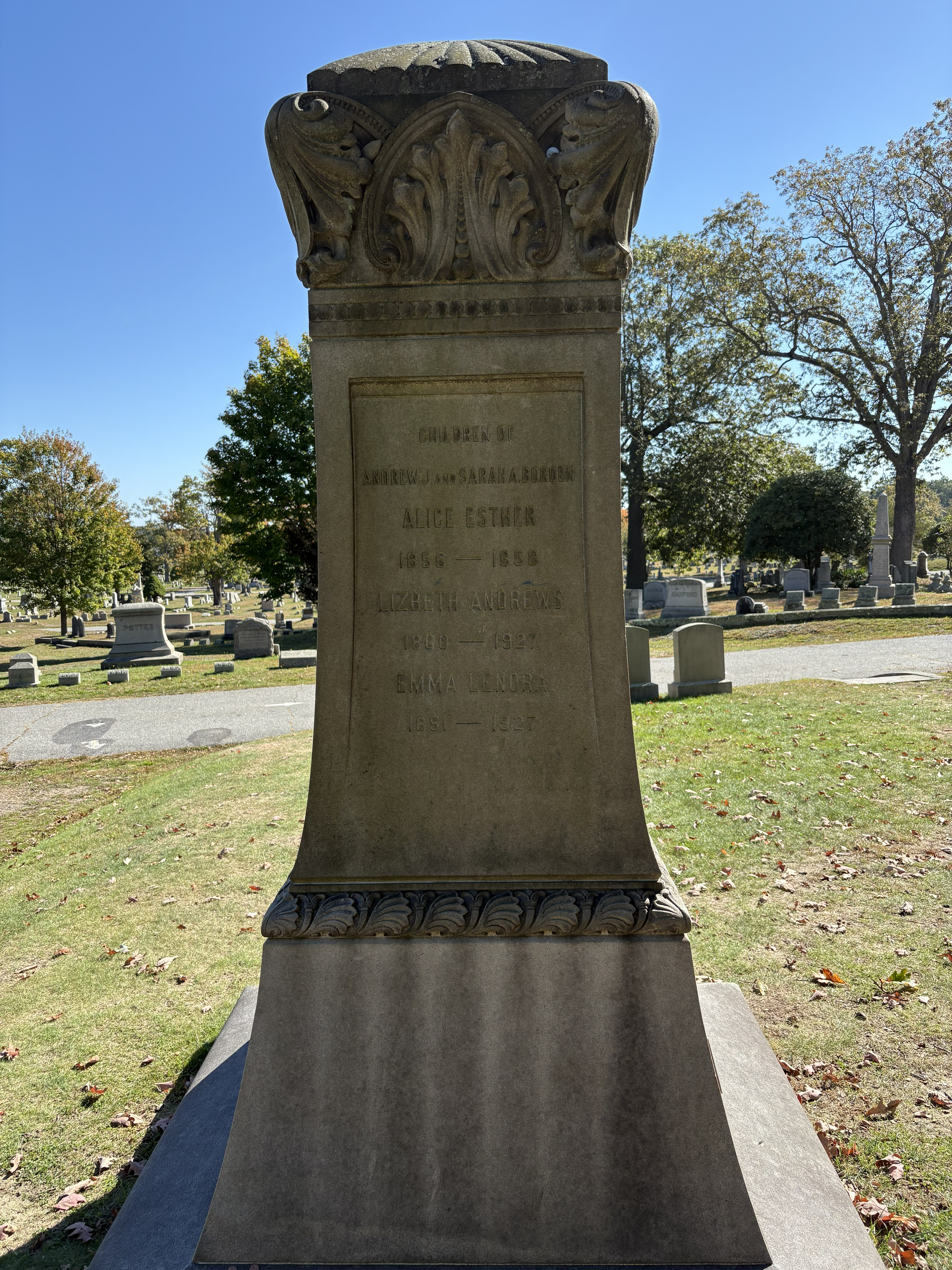
Gravestone of Borden Children

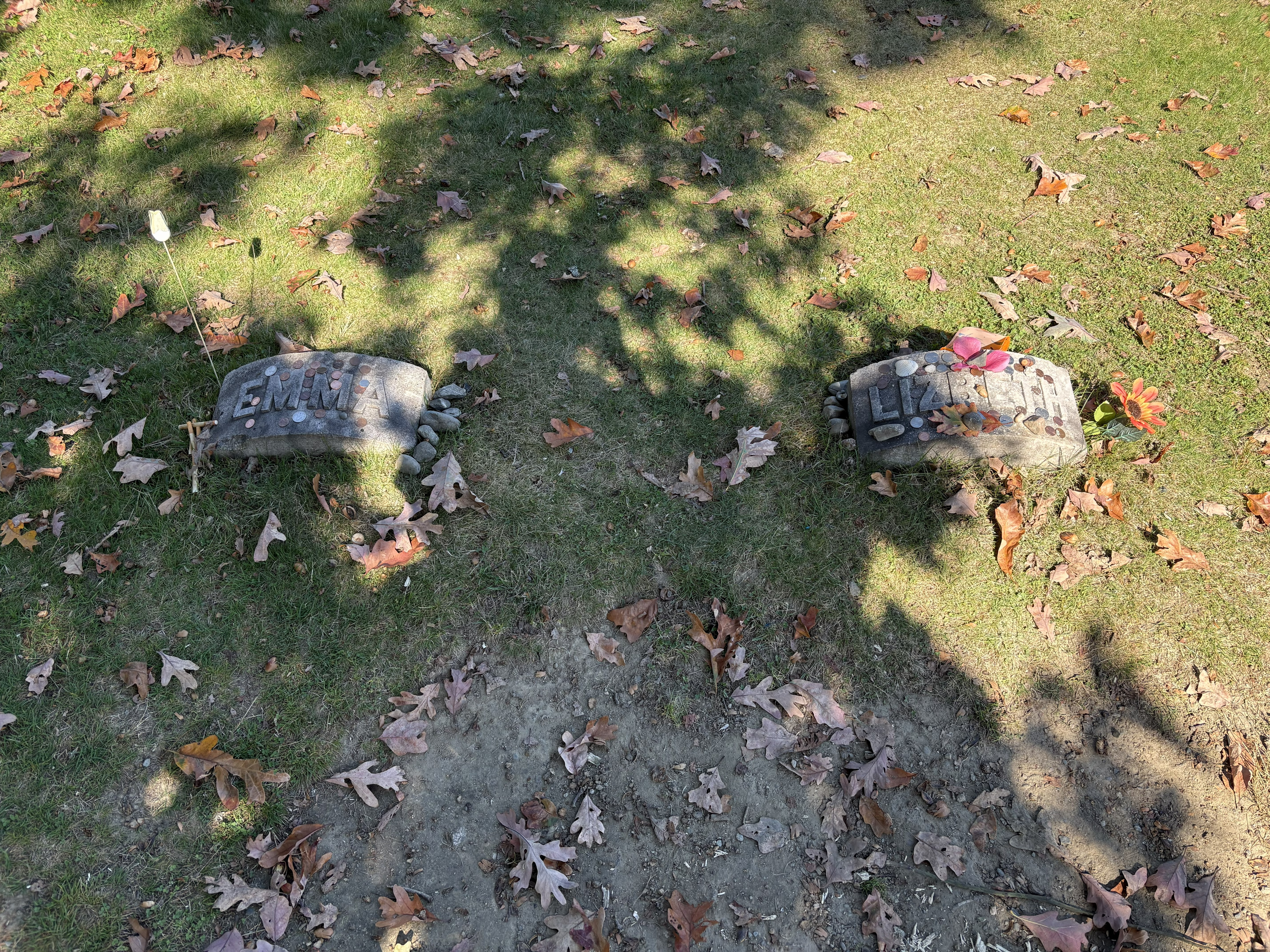
Graves of Emma and Lizzie Borden

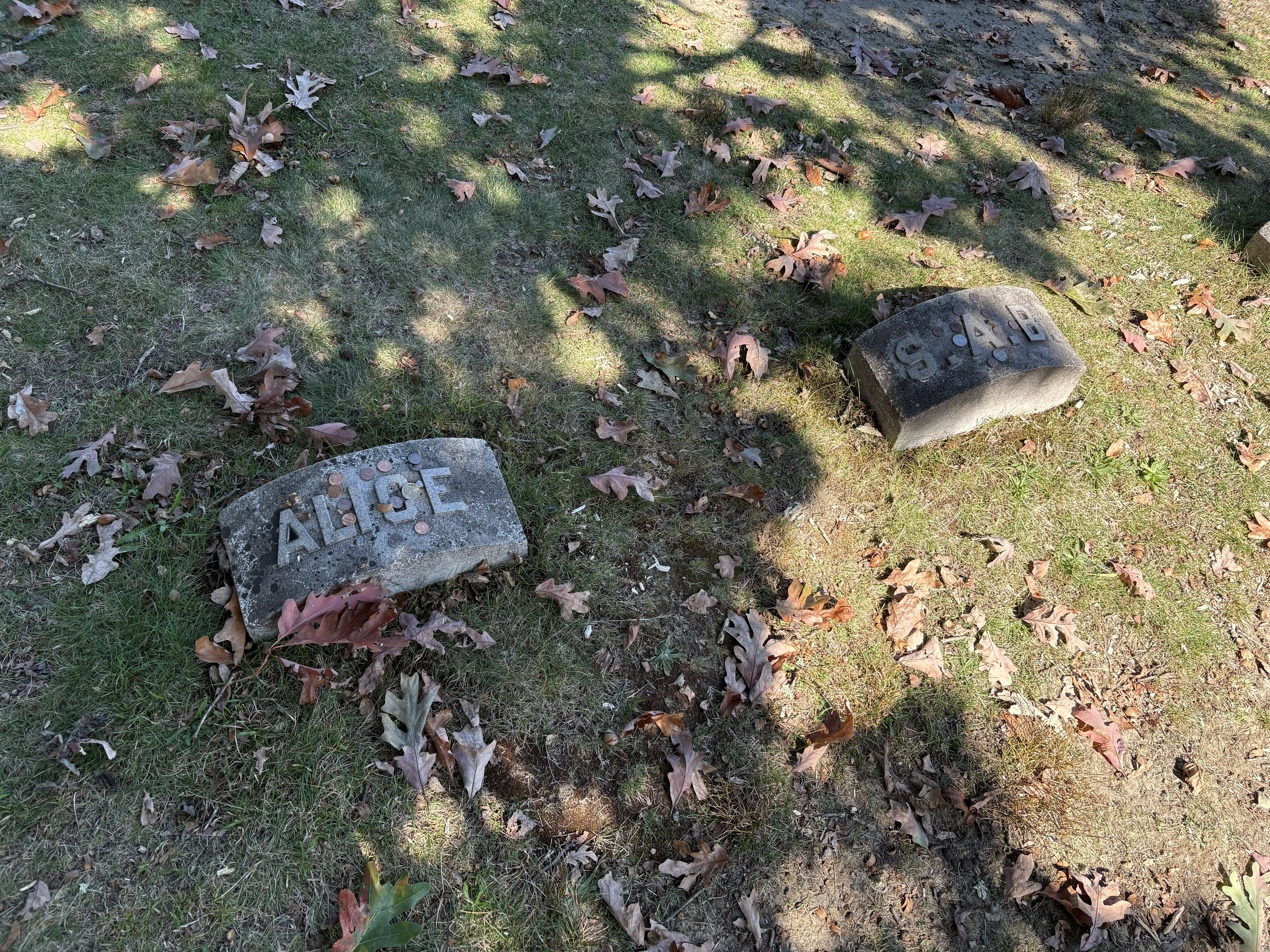
Graves of Alice and Sarah Borden

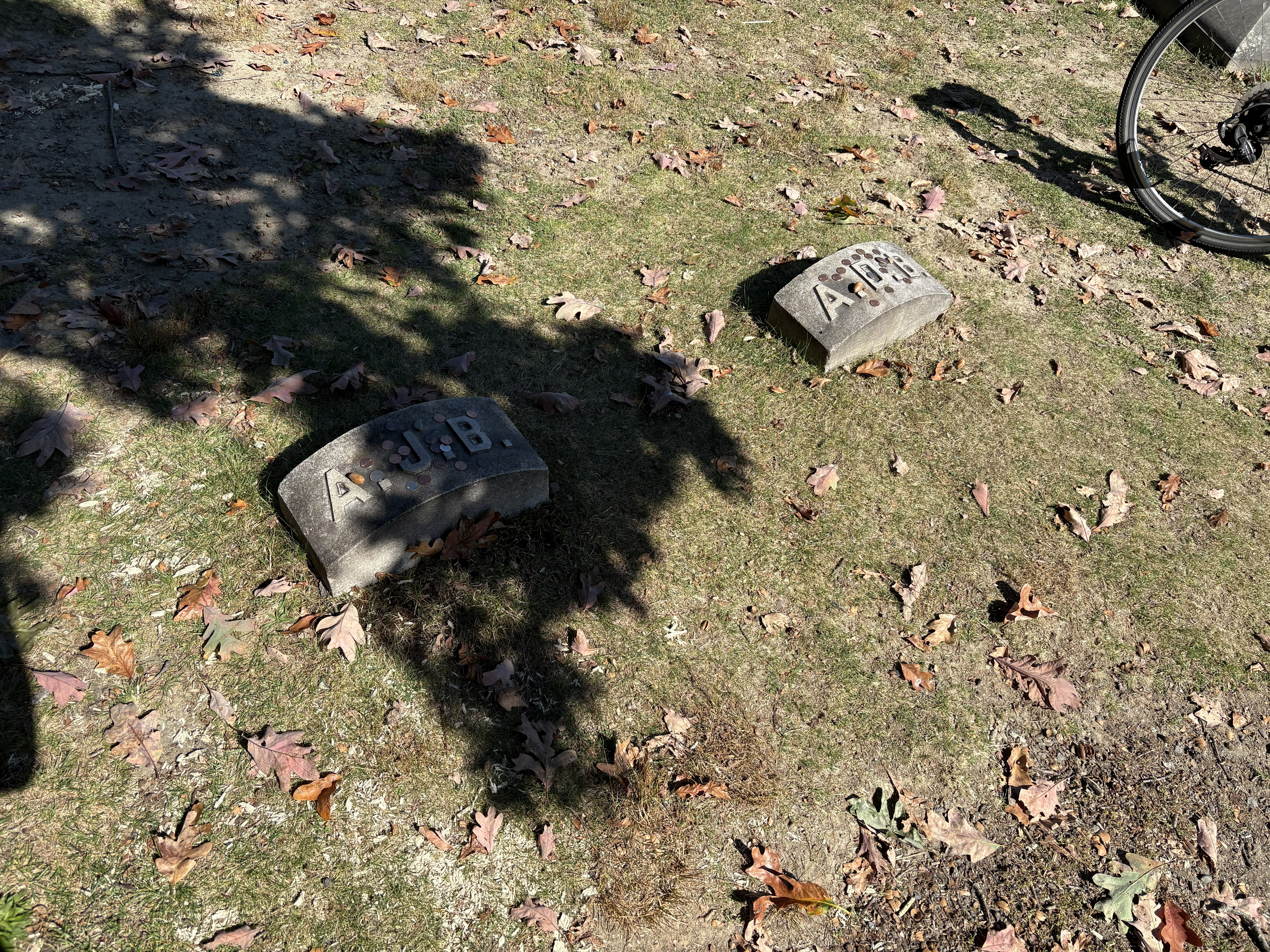
Graves of Andrew and Abby Borden

- Thomas Almy (1819–1882), co-founder of The Herald News.
- Abby Durfee Borden (1828–1892), second wife of Andrew Jackson Borden and murder victim.
- Andrew Jackson Borden (1822–1892), businessman and murder victim.
- Nathaniel Briggs Borden (1801–1865), Mayor of Fall River (1856–1857), US Congressman, and founder of Pocasset Mill.
- Colonel Richard Borden (1795–1874), industrial pioneer, businessman.
- Lizzie Borden (1860–1927), alleged (acquitted) murderer.
- Emma Borden (1851–1927), sister of Lizzie Borden, daughter of Andrew and Sarah Borden.
- Sarah Morse Borden (1823–1863), first wife of Andrew Jackson Borden and mother of Lizzie Borden and Emma Borden.
- Spencer Borden (1872–1952), manufacturer, delegate to 1924 Republication National Convention, served as director on boards of a number of local concerns.
- Charlie Buffinton (1861–1907), Major League Baseball player.
- James Buffington (1817–1875), the first mayor of Fall River.
- Earle Perry Charlton (1863–1930), founder of E. P. Charlton & Co. 5 & 10 stores chain. Through mergers, he became a co-founder of the F. W. Woolworth Company.
- Benjamin Cook, a District Court judge.
- Sarah M. Cornell (1803–1832), found murdered on the John Durfee Farm in nearby Tiverton, Newport County, RI. She was originally buried there and moved to Oak Grove.
- Robert T. Davis (1823–1906), mayor of Fall River and United States Representative from Massachusetts.
- Bradford Matthew Chaloner Durfee (1843–1872), born into a wealthy and influential Fall River family, he was a philanthropist who died in his prime. As a memorial, his mother had the local school board erect the B. M. C Durfee High School.
- Nathan Durfee (1799–1876), early industrialist and deacon of Central Congregational Church.
- William Thomas Grant (1876–1972), founder of W. T. Grant Department Store chain and philanthropist.
- William S. Greene (1841–1924), United States Representative from Massachusetts, also mayor of Fall River.
- Cornelius Hargraves (1809–1874), an immigrant from England who, in 1851, founded Hargraves Manufacturing Company, a soap and glue substitute manufacturing operation.
- Reuben Hargraves (1834–1905) and Thomas Hargraves (1836–1904), sons of Cornelius Hargraves are buried in the Hargraves Mausoluem.
- Mary Evelyn Hitchcock (1849–1920), author and explorer
- James Holehouse (1839–1915), received the Medal of Honor for bravery at the Battle of Chancellorsville on May 3, 1863. He was a private in Company B, 7th Massachusetts Volunteer Infantry.
- Grace Hartley Howe (1874–1955), wife of Louie Howe and delegate to the 1936 Democratic National Convention.
- Louis McHenry ("Louie") Howe (1871–1936), political strategist who masterminded Franklin D. Roosevelt's 1932 presidential election. He was the only close friend both FDR and Eleanor Roosevelt shared in common.
- Andrew Jackson Jennings (1849–1923), noted local attorney, now best remembered for successfully defending Lizzie Borden.
- Lewis Howard Latimer (1848–1928), African-American inventor and engineer who collaborated with Alexander Graham Bell and Thomas Edison.
- John O. Milne, co-founder of The Herald News.
- Lt. Joseph S. Milne (1842–1863), mortally wounded at Pickett's Charge, Battle of Gettysburg; died July 8, 1863, temporarily attached to Battery B 1st Rhode Island Light Artillery.
- James Madison Morton (1837–1923), an Associate Justice of the Supreme Judicial Court of Massachusetts.
- James Madison Morton, Jr. (1869–1940), a Federal judge.
- Maude Frances Darling Parlin (1885–1979), pioneer female architect and 1907 M.I.T. graduate who designed many Fall River buildings and homes.
- Cornelia Otis Skinner (1899–1979), actress, biographer, dramatist, essayists, novels, and screenwriter.

== Notable monuments ==
- F. H. Stafford (d. 1892), owner of Stafford Mills, is shaped like a textile mill building.

== See also ==
- National Register of Historic Places listings in Fall River, Massachusetts
- North Burial Ground (Fall River, Massachusetts)
