= James Holehouse =

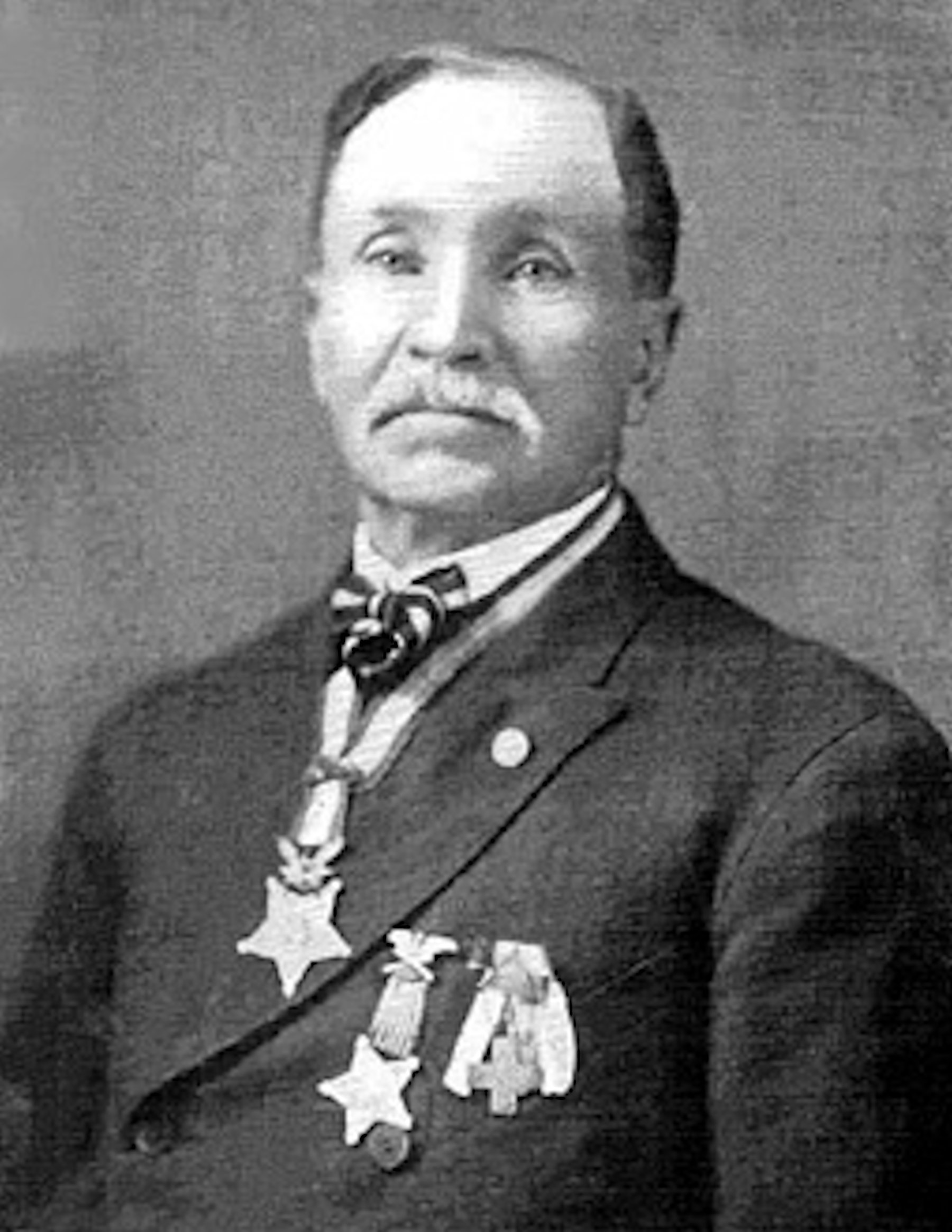
- James Holehouse in 1913
- Born: December 25, 1839; Stockport, England
- Died: May 20, 1915 (aged 75); Chelsea, Massachusetts
- Burial place: Oak Grove Cemetery (Fall River, Massachusetts)
- Military career
- Allegiance: United States of America
- Branch: United States Army; Union Army
- Rank: Private
- Unit: 7th Massachusetts Infantry Regiment
- Awards: Medal of Honor

James Holehouse (December 25, 1839 - May 20, 1915) was an English born soldier in the Union Army during the American Civil War and recipient of the Medal of Honor.

== Biography ==
Holehouse was born in England on December 25, 1839. He immigrated to America at some point from his birth until the start of Civil War. During the war he served as a private in Company B of the 7th Massachusetts Volunteer Infantry. He earned his medal in action at Marye's Heights, Virginia on May 3, 1863. The medal's citation reads "With one companion voluntarily and with conspicuous daring advanced beyond his regiment, which had been broken In the assault, and halted beneath the crest. Following the example of these two men, the colors were brought to the summit, the regiment was advanced and the position held."

== Notes ==
There is some dispute over the battle at which Holehouse earned his medal. Some sources report the Second Battle of Fredericksburg while others report it is as the Battle of Chancellorsville.
