= M. C. D. Borden =

American businessman

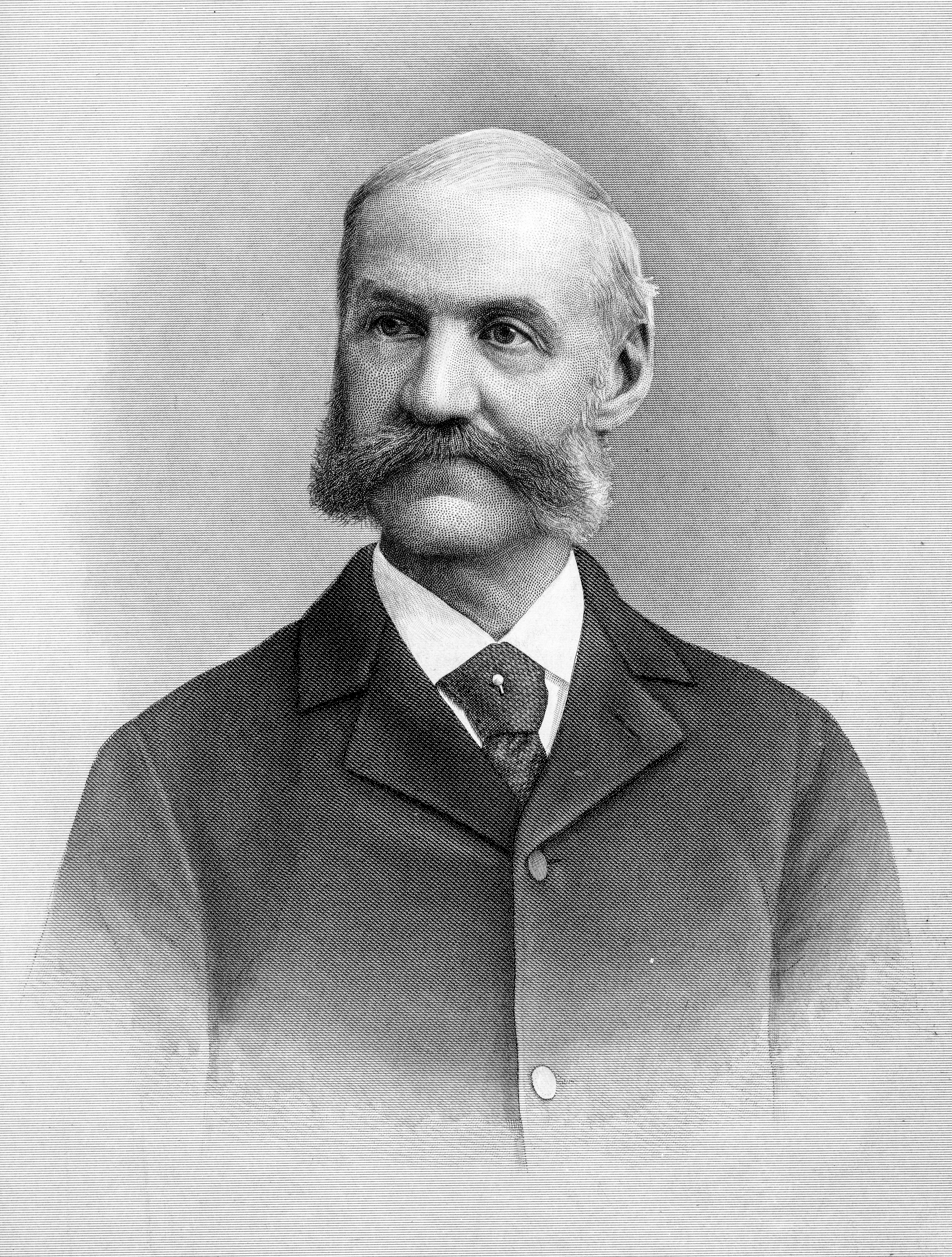
- Born: Matthew Chaloner Durfee Borden; July 18, 1842; Fall River, Massachusetts
- Died: May 27, 1912 (aged 69); Oceanic, New Jersey
- Education: Yale University
- Occupation: Industrialist
- Known for: American Printing Company
- Spouse: Harriett M. Durfee
- Children: 7
- Father: Richard Borden

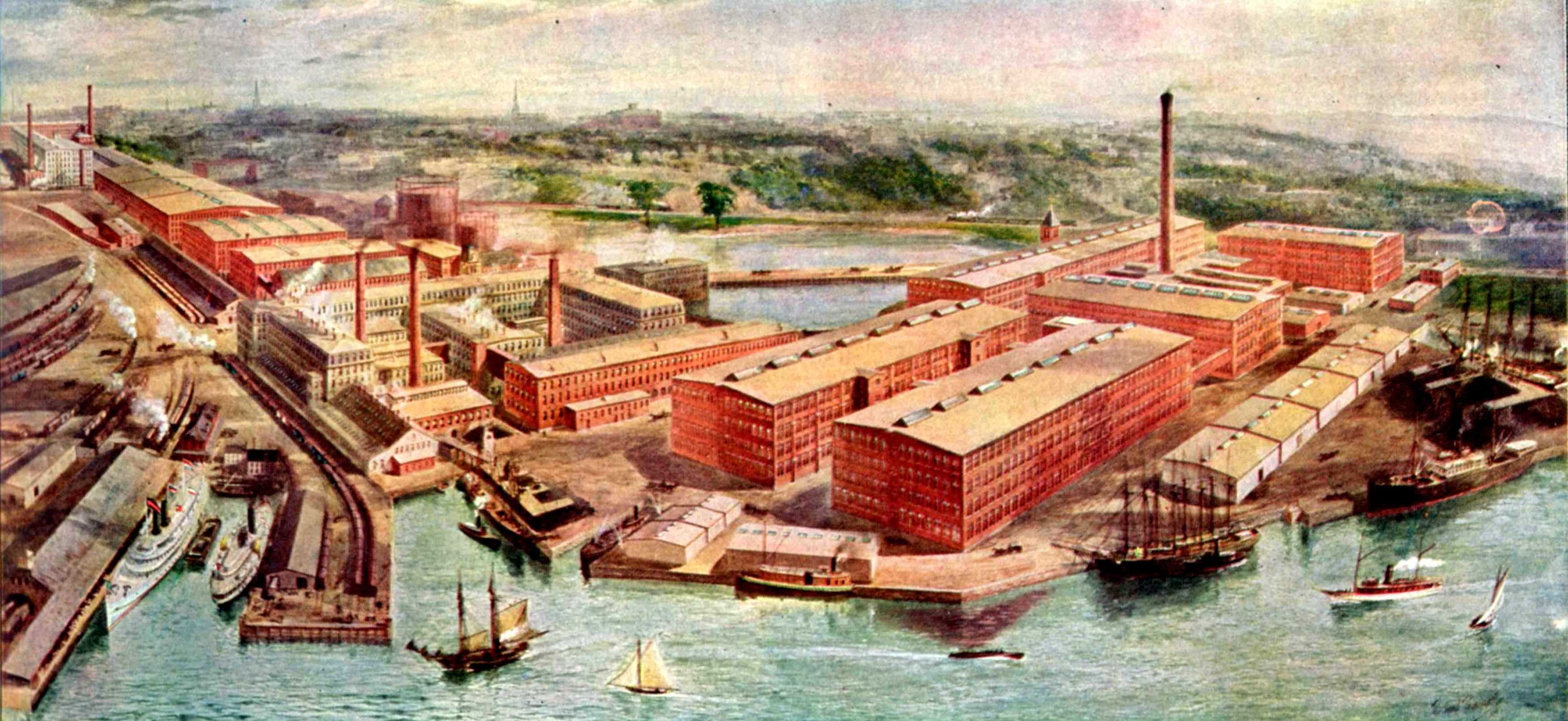
Overview of American Printing Company, Fall River, Massachusetts

Matthew Chaloner Durfee Borden (July 18, 1842 – May 27, 1912) was an American textile leader from Fall River, Massachusetts, who, in 1880 reorganized the failed American Print Works into the American Printing Company. In the years that followed, his company would grow to become the largest cloth-printing company in the world, earning him the nickname "the Calico King". His father was Colonel Richard Borden, who founded the Fall River Iron Works.

== Early life ==
Matthew Borden was born in Fall River, Massachusetts, on July 18, 1842. He was the son of prominent local businessman Richard Borden and Abby Durfee Borden.

In 1860, he graduated from Phillips Academy in Andover. He went on to Yale University, obtaining an A.B. degree in 1864, and an A.M. in 1867. At Yale he was a member of Delta Kappa Epsilon and Skull and Bones.

In 1865, he married his relative, Harriet M. Durfee of Fall River, with whom he had seven children, including three sons; Bertram Howard, Matthew Sterling and Howard Seymour.

His business career began in 1864, when he entered one of New York's leading dry goods house as a stock boy. By 1867 he had become a partner in a New York commission house, where he represented the American Print Works as a selling agent. Borden had inherited a large share of the print works from his father, who died in 1874. However, in 1879, the print works failed, causing him to lose his job in New York. With the help of his older brother, he reorganized the company under the name of The American Printing Company in January 1880. He allied himself with the commission house of J. S. & E. Wright & Co. (later Bliss, Fabyan & Co.) with whom he maintained fruitful relations for many years. One of the partners of Bliss, Fabyan & Co. was Cornelius Newton Bliss, who would later become Secretary of the Interior.

== Rise of the "Calico King" ==
In 1887, Borden bought his brother's interest in The American Printing Company. Borden sought to increase profits, and to become independent of the open market. This led him to commence the building of three large cloth mills in Fall River in 1889. By 1892 Borden's business were churning out around 70,000 pieces of print cloth week. Half of the cloth was being supplied by his own mills.

In order to raise money for his textile business he regularly turned to his fellow Bonesman and roommate at Yale, John William Sterling. Sterling was a well-known New York banker, with access to the Stillman and Rockefeller crowds.

Borden also kept a home in New York City, and integrated himself into the high society of that city. He also had many financial interests in New York, being a director of the Manhattan Company Bank, the Lincoln National Bank, the Astor Place Bank, the Lincoln Safe Deposit Co. and the New York Security & Trust Co. Borden was a Republican in politics. For several years he served as New York City Commissioner of Parks. He was also a trustee and treasurer of The Clinton Hall Association, and governor of the New York Woman's Hospital.

He was a member of Delta Kappa Epsilon, Down Town Association, Jekyll Island Club, Merchants Club of New York, Metropolitan Club of New York, New England Society, New York Yacht Club, Players Club of New York, Republican Club of New York, Riding Club of New York, Seawanhaka Corinthian Yacht Club, Skull and Bones, South Side Sportsmen's Club, Union League Club of New York and the Whist Club of New York.

In 1898, Borden's steam yacht named Sovereign was acquired by the United States Navy and renamed the USS Scorpion (PY-3), serving the Navy until 1929.

== Death and legacy ==
Borden died on May 27, 1912, at his summer residence in Oceanic, New Jersey. When word of his death was received, all of his mills were temporarily closed.

He left an estate valued at over $5 million, about half of which was from his shares in the American Printing Company. His will also provided $250,000 to Yale University.

In 1918, the United States Navy acquired another of Borden's luxury yachts, also called Sovereign (launched 1911). It was renamed the USS Sovereign, and served as a patrol boat during World War I. In April 1919, the Sovereign was stricken from the Navy List, and soon after returned to her owner's estate.
