= Richard Borden =

American businessman (1795–1874)

Colonel Richard Borden
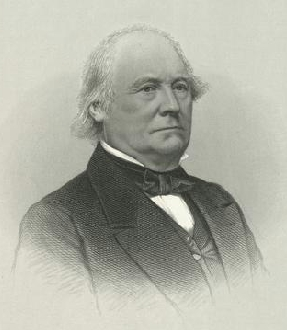
- Richard Borden
- Born: April 12, 1795; Freetown, Massachusetts, US
- Died: February 25, 1874 (aged 78); Fall River, Massachusetts, US
- Resting place: Oak Grove Cemetery
- Occupation: Industrialist
- Known for: Fall River Iron Works
- Spouse: Abby W. Durfee
- Children: 7, including M.C.D. Borden

Colonel Richard Borden (1795–1874) was an American businessman and civic leader from Fall River, Massachusetts. He co-founded the Fall River Iron Works in 1821, and later built several early cotton mills, as well as the Fall River Line, Fall River Gas Works Company, the Fall River Railroad, banks and other businesses. The Borden family would dominate the economic and civic life of Fall River into the early 20th century.

== Early life ==
When the Town of Fall River was established in 1803, the Borden family had been well established in the area for over a century. In 1714, Colonel Richard's ancestor (also named Richard) purchased land along the falls of the Quequechan River from Benjamin Church, along with a saw mill, a grist mill and a fulling mill. Eventually the Borden family would acquire the water rights of the entire Quequechan River valley, and its tremendous potential.

Borden began working in a grist mill at age fifteen. Most of the area's corn was ground at his mill. He became adept in the task of sailing and boating in the Narragansett Bay, as part of the grist mill business. He also operated a saw mill adjacent to the grist mill during these years.

Borden acquired the rank of "colonel" in the local militia in 1828.

In 1828, Borden married Abby Walker Durfee. Together they had seven children; two daughters and five sons. Three of their sons would continue in their father's footsteps and become involved in the Fall River textile business; Thomas James Borden (1832–1902), Richard Baxter Borden (1834–1906) and Matthew Challoner Durfee Borden (1842–1912).

== Industrial pioneer ==
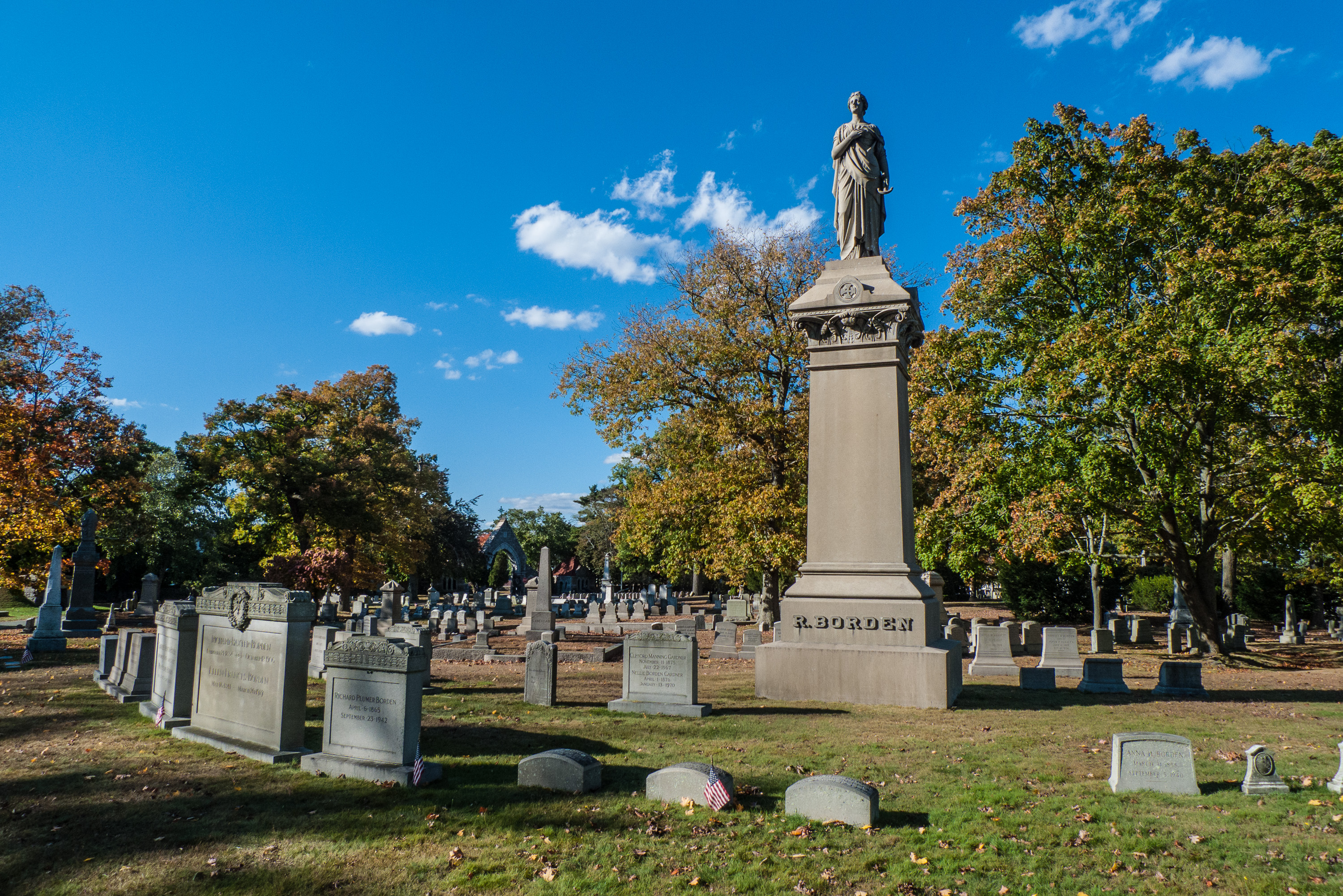
Richard and many other Borden family members are buried at Oak Grove Cemetery

In 1821, Borden established the Fall River Iron Works, along with Major Bradford Durfee, and several others at the lower part of the Quequechan River. Bradford Durfee was a shipwright, and Richard Borden was the owner of a grist mill. After an uncertain start, in which some early investors pulled out, the Fall River Iron Works was incorporated in 1825, with $200,000 in capital. The Iron Works began producing nails, bar stock, and other items such as bands for casks in the nearby New Bedford whaling industry. They soon gained a reputation for producing nails of high quality, and business flourished. By 1845, the company was valued at $960,000. In 1827, Borden began regular steamship service to Providence, Rhode Island.

The Iron Works would continue play an important role in the early development of the textile industry in Fall River. Richard Borden later constructed the Metacomet Mill in 1847, which today is the oldest remaining textile mill in the city, located on Anawan Street.

== Other businesses ==
Borden also established the first railroad line to serve Fall River, The Fall River Branch Railroad, was incorporated in 1844 and opened in 1845 to Myricks Junction, with a connection to Boston via Mansfield via the Taunton Branch Railroad. However, wanting a more direct route to Boston, Borden opened a new line in 1846 connecting with the Old Colony Railroad at South Braintree via Middleborough and Bridgewater. The Fall River Branch Railroad was merged with the Middleborough Railroad Corporation and the Randolph & Bridgewater Railroad Corporation to become the Fall River Railroad Company.

In 1847, regular steamship service to New York City began as the Bay State Steamboat Company, later known as the Fall River Line. It was America's most luxurious steamship line connecting rail travelers from Boston to Manhattan. It would operate until 1937.

== Legacy ==
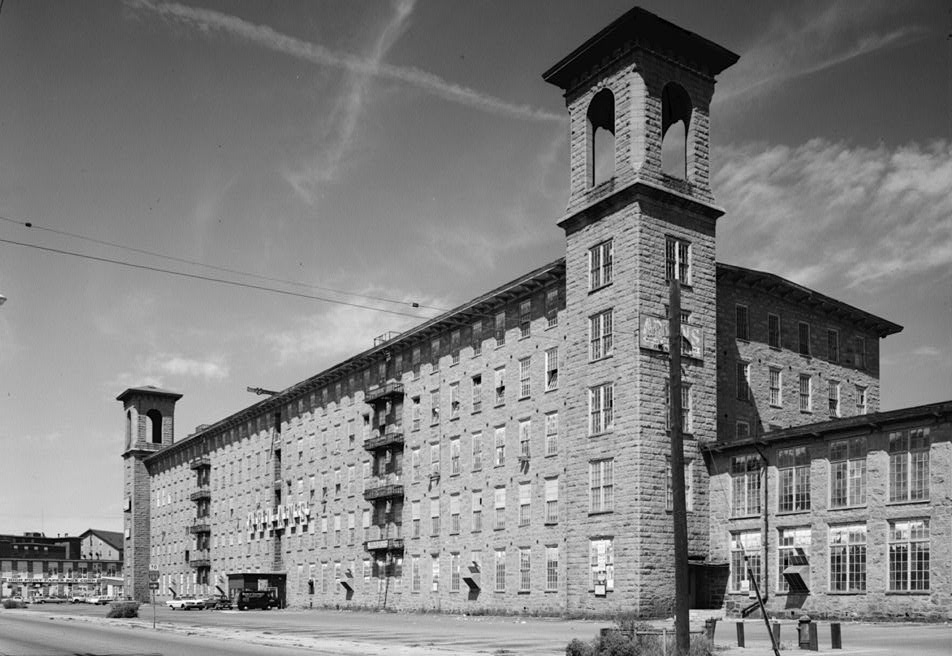
Richard Borden Mill (1968 photo)

Three of Richard Borden's sons would carry on their father's tradition in the family's businesses. In 1871, his eldest son, Colonel Thomas James Borden (1832–1902) would build the Richard Borden Mill, as a tribute to his father, and succeed his uncle Jefferson as agent of the Print Works, as well as numerous other concerns.

Richard Baxter Borden (1834–1906) would serve as either president, director and treasurer of several mills, banks and insurance companies.

Matthew C.D. Borden (1842–1912) would eventually take over the American Printing Company in 1887.

== See also ==
- History of Fall River, Massachusetts
