= North Burial Ground (Fall River, Massachusetts) =

Historic cemetery in Bristol County, Massachusetts, US

- U.S. National Register of Historic Places
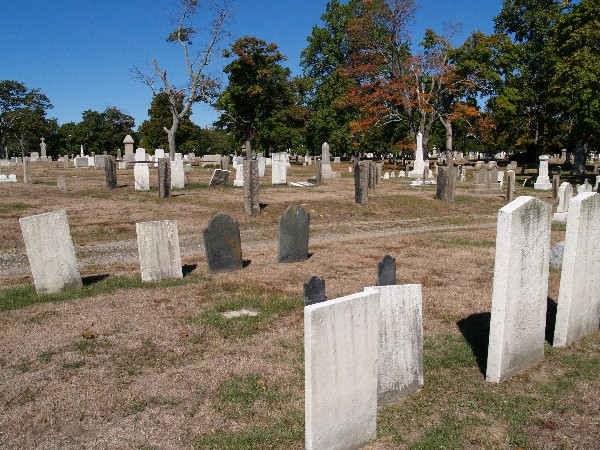

- Location within Massachusetts Location within the United States
- Location: Fall River, Massachusetts
- Coordinates: 41°43′11″N 71°9′0″W
- Built: 1810
- Architectural style: Late Victorian, Exotic Revival, Other
- MPS: Fall River MRA
- NRHP reference No.: 83000695
- Added to NRHP: February 16, 1983

North Burial Ground is a historic cemetery located on North Main Street between Brightman and Cory Streets in Fall River, Massachusetts, United States. The cemetery was established in 1810 and added to the National Register of Historic Places in 1983. It is the oldest city-owned cemetery in Fall River.

The cemetery features a fieldstone gatehouse, built about 1890 and an Egyptian Revival receiving tomb built in 1849 from local Fall River granite. After Oak Grove Cemetery opened in 1855, the remains of many were transferred there from North Burial Ground, as it was considered to be the more fashionable resting place.

== Notable burials ==
- Orin Fowler (1791–1852), US Representative.
- James H. "Jim" Manning (1862–1929), MLB player and manager

== Gallery ==
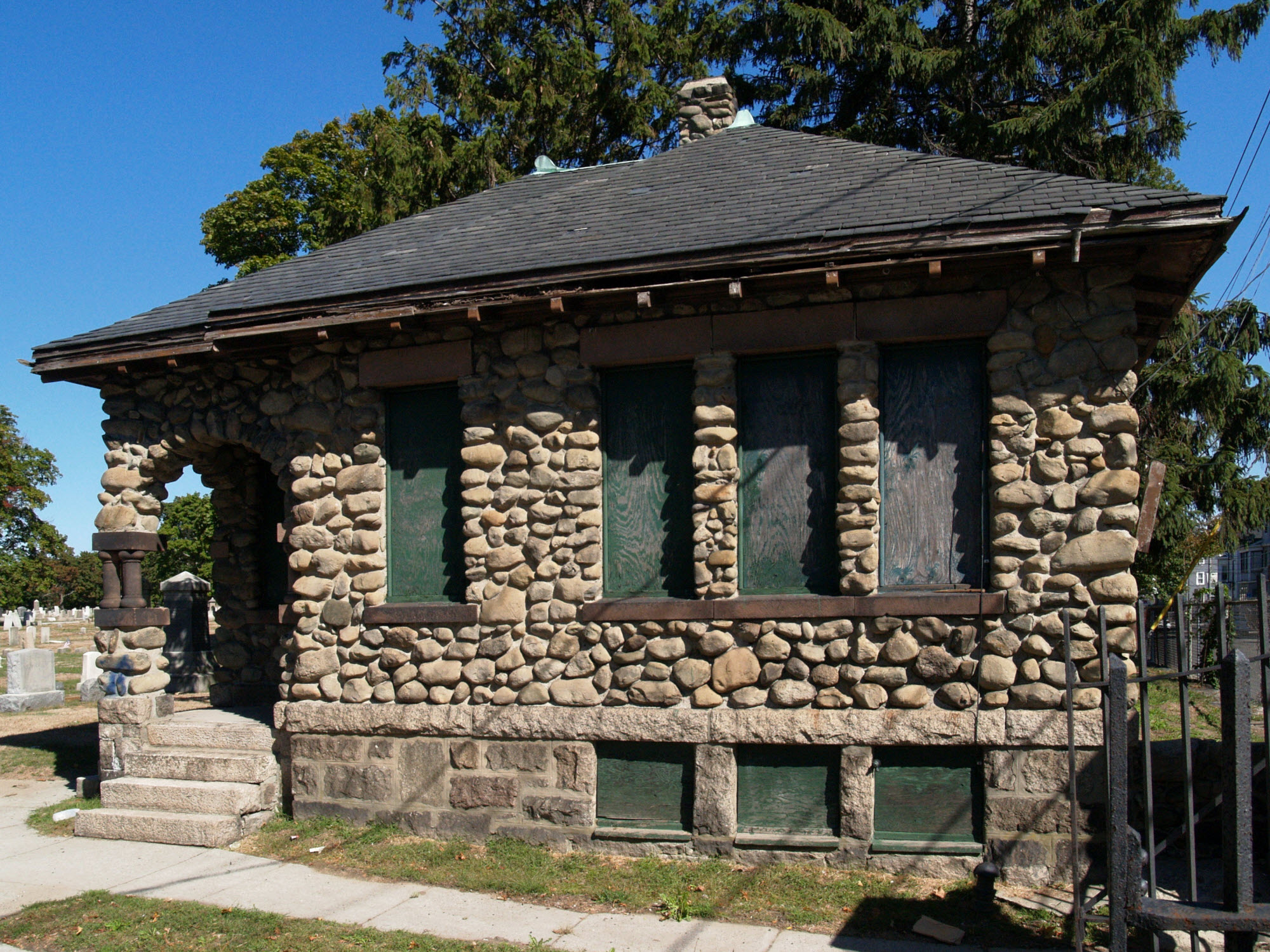
Gatehouse (1890)

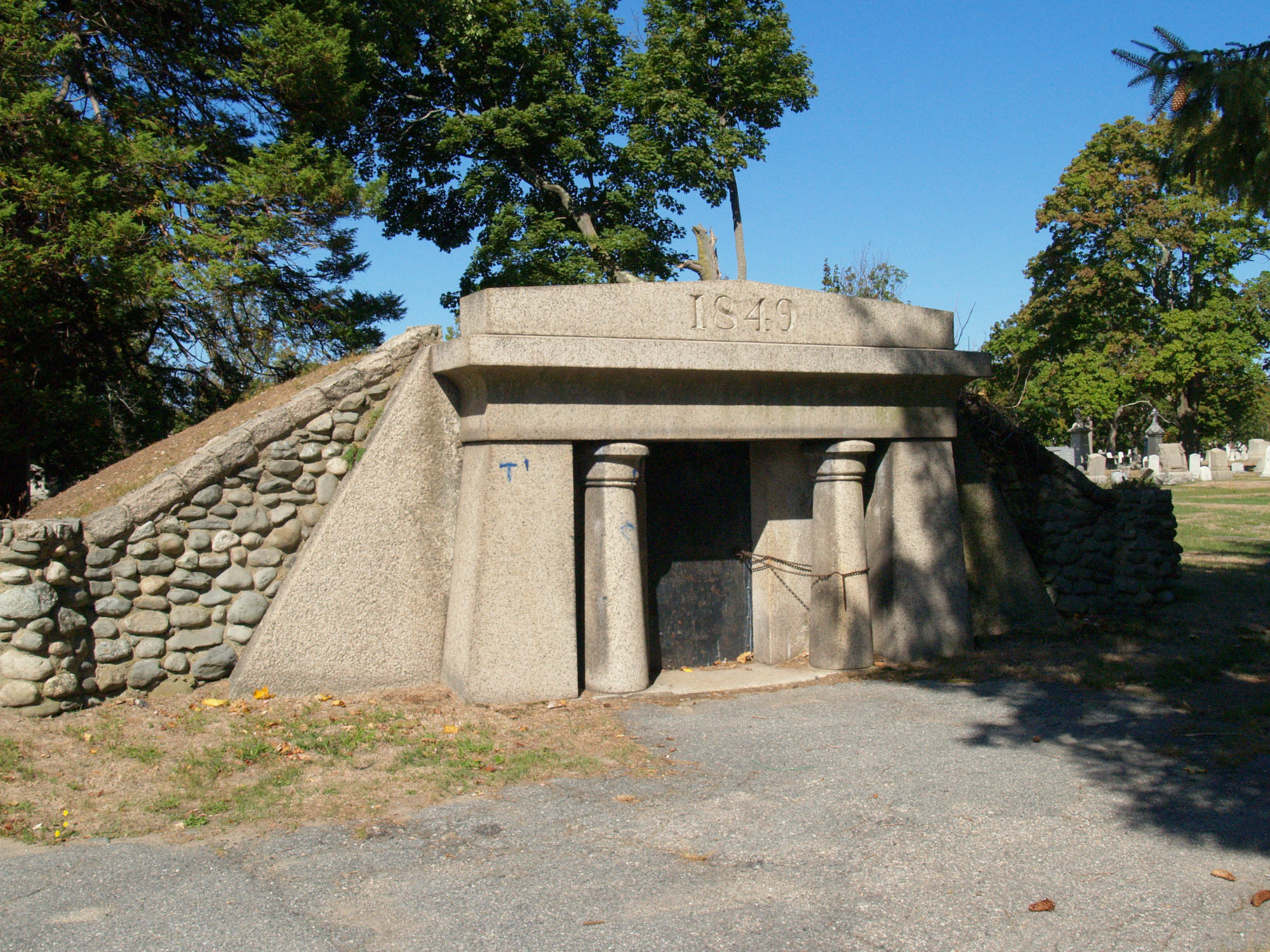
Receiving tomb (1849)

== See also ==
- National Register of Historic Places listings in Fall River, Massachusetts
