= Luther's Corner =

- U.S. National Register of Historic Places
- U.S. Historic district
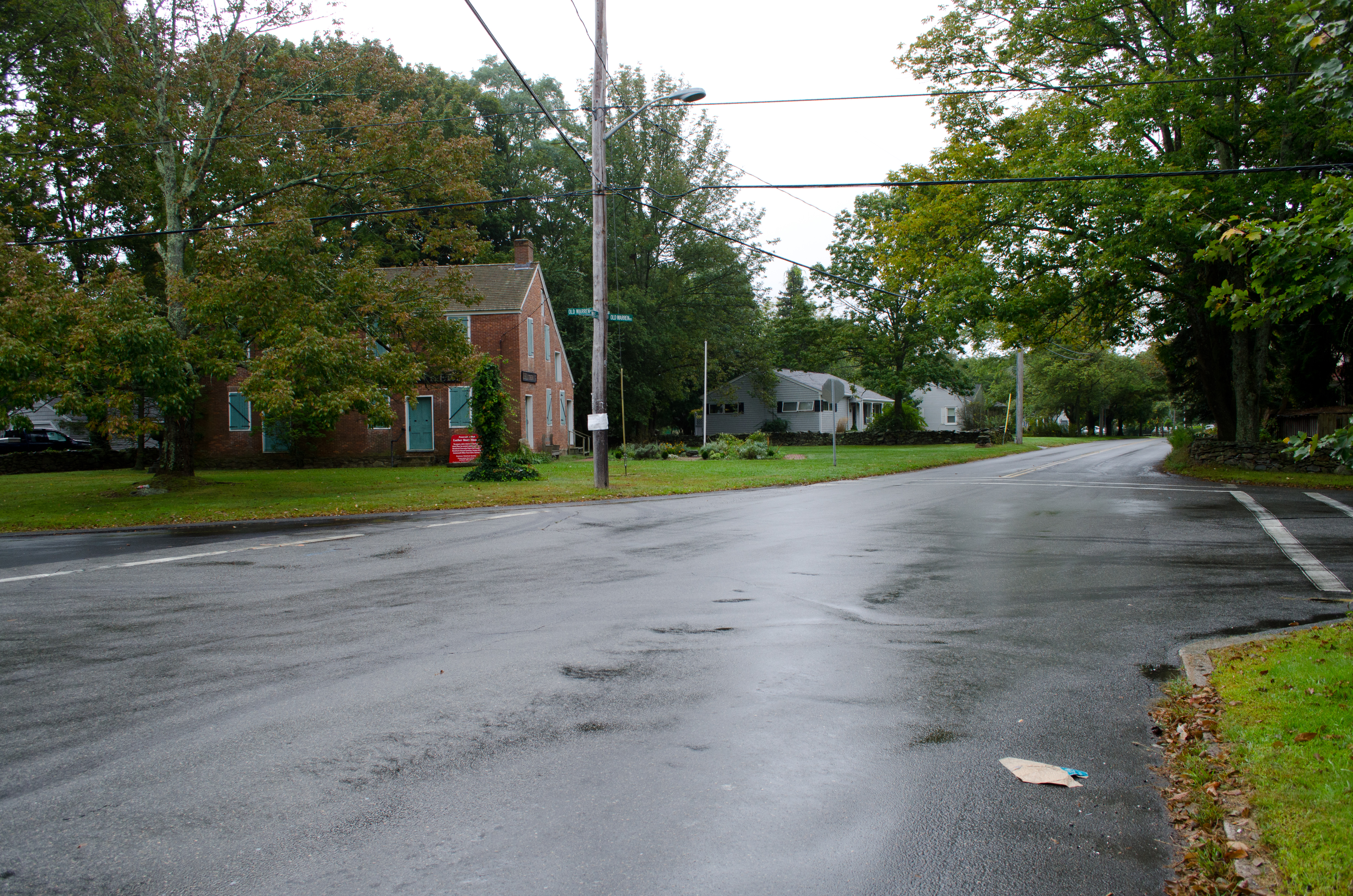

- Location within Massachusetts Location within the United States
- Location: Swansea, Massachusetts
- Coordinates: 41°44′42″N 71°13′27″W
- Area: 1.5 acres (0.61 ha)
- Architectural style: Federal
- MPS: Swansea MRA
- NRHP reference No.: 90000054
- Added to NRHP: February 16, 1990

Luther's Corner is a historic district encompassing the original economic center of Swansea, Massachusetts. The district is centered on the junction of Old Warren and Pearse Roads, the former being a major stage route between Fall River and Providence, Rhode Island, and was for many years associated with the locally prominent Luther Family. Luther's Corner was added to the National Register of Historic Places in 1990.

== Description and history ==
Luther's Corner is located in western Swansea, just southwest of the intersection of United States Route 6 and Interstate 195. Old Warren Road, the east-west route through the junction, was originally a major through street, but has now been truncated by that highway interchange. The corner developed as a stage coach stop in the early 19th century, providing services to passing travelers, and developed as the major economic center of Swansea in the first half of the 19th century. Three of the four principal structures in the 1.5-acre (0.61 ha) district are associated with the locally prominent Luther family, including the Luther Store (c. 1815-18, now a local history museum), the James Luther Tavern (c. 1800), and the John Brown-Luther House (c. 1811). The fourth building is the Seth Eddy House and Store, built in 1871, and now strictly residential in use. All four buildings are 2-1/2 story wood frame structures.

Luther's Store was one of the most successful mercantile businesses in Swansea in the mid-19th century, also housing the local post office and library. After it closed in 1870 (the building converted to just a residence), the Eddy Store replaced it, but the area was declining in importance due in part to increased use of the railroad, which ran further south. The town green, originally located at the center of the road junction and housing a bandstand, was removed in 1901 to make way for a streetcar line.

== See also ==
- National Register of Historic Places listings in Bristol County, Massachusetts
