= Josiah Brown =

American engineer

- Born: July 10, 1816; Smithfield, Rhode Island
- Died: July 30, 1875 (aged 59); Fall River, Massachusetts
- Occupation: Architect

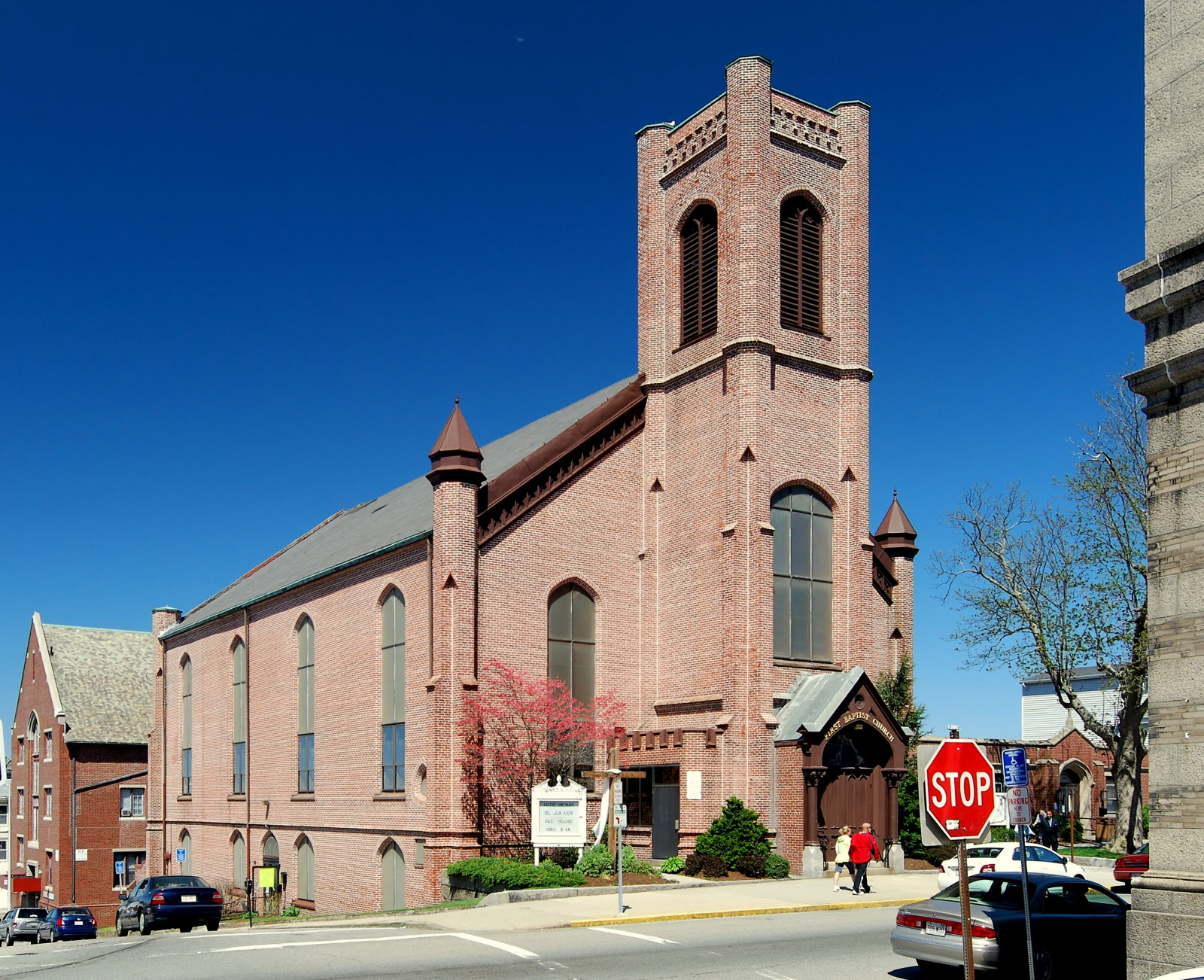
First Baptist Church, Fall River, Massachusetts, 1850

Josiah Brown (1816–1875) was an American architect and civil and mill engineer of Fall River, Massachusetts. Among his major surviving projects are the Union Mill No. 1 (1859) and Border City Mill No. 2 (1873), both in Fall River.

== Life and career ==
Josiah Brown was born July 10, 1816, in Smithfield, Rhode Island, to Parley and Lucy (Southwick) Brown. Parley Brown was a methodist minister and was later a resident of East Douglas.

Brown received some education from his father, but he was mostly self-taught. He was a resident of Fall River by 1847, (Note: This noted in the context of Brown's subscription to the American Art-Union.) and was noted as an "Architect" in the first Fall River directory of 1853. In some of his early mill projects, Brown was assisted by the prominent machinist and mill superintendent William C. Davol. Brown was also the first employer of William C. Davol Jr., who would later establish the Davol Mills. (Note: The Davol Mills as well as Davol's house have both been listed on the National Register of Historic Places.) From 1870 to 1875 William T. Henry, a graduate of the Massachusetts Institute of Technology, was in his office. Brown died July 30, 1875, at which point Henry succeeded to his practice.

The cause of death was Bright's disease.

In addition to his architectural and mill engineering work, Brown was involved in the Hoosac Tunnel project, serving as Chief Assistant Engineer under Thomas Doane, Chief Engineer from 1863 to 1867. He was also involved financially in several of his manufacturing projects. He was both organizer and initial president of the Montaup Mills, incorporated in 1871, and a director of the Robeson Mills, incorporated in 1866. At the time of his death, he was also a director of the Davol Mills, though it is not known if he was the architect.

He was the designer of several works listed on the United States National Register of Historic Places.

== Works ==
Year	Building	Address	City	State	Notes	Image	Reference
1850	First Baptist Church	228 N Main St	Fall River	Massachusetts	Listed on the National Register of Historic Places in 1983.		
1855	Plan of Oak Grove Cemetery	765 Prospect St	Fall River	Massachusetts	Designed on the model of Mount Auburn Cemetery, the archetypical garden cemetery. Listed on the National Register of Historic Places in 1983.		
1857	Plan of Evergreen Cemetery	49 West St	East Douglas	Massachusetts			
1858	House for Josiah Brown	521 N Main St	Fall River	Massachusetts	The architect's own home.		
1859	Union Mill No. 1	289 Pleasant St	Fall River	Massachusetts	Listed on the National Register of Historic Places in 1983.		
1866	Robeson Mill No. 1	350 Rodman St	Fall River	Massachusetts	Demolished in 2001.		
1872	Border City Mill No. 1	1 West St	Fall River	Massachusetts	Burned in 1877.		
1872	Montaup Mill	1089 Dwelly St	Fall River	Massachusetts	Brown was the organizer and first president of the Montaup company. Later Osborn Mill No. 2. Burned in 1940.		
1873	Border City Mill No. 2	2 Weaver St	Fall River	Massachusetts	Listed on the National Register of Historic Places in 1990.		
