= Maude Darling-Parlin =

American architect

Maude Frances Darling-Parlin
- Born: August 20, 1884; Fall River, Massachusetts
- Died: February 27, 1979 (aged 94); Fall River, Massachusetts
- Occupation: Architect
- Practice: Darling and Parlin

Maude Frances Darling-Parlin (August 20, 1884 – February 27, 1979) was an American architect from Fall River, Massachusetts who is known for her houses, theaters, and civic projects.

== Biography ==
Maude Frances Darling was born to George Darling and Frances Lydia Rebecca Davis. She was born into a family of architects, including her father and her grandfather Joseph M. Darling.

Darling graduated from B.M.C. Durfee High School in 1903. Then, she graduated the Massachusetts Institute of Technology in 1907 after submitting her thesis for a community dining hall. She later attended Pratt Institute. Darling married MIT classmate Raymond W. Parlin in 1910, a sanitary engineer and street commissioner. he died in 1924 after they had three children.

Although Darling-Parlin considered teaching, her father convinced her to focus on the family firm with her brother George S. Darling; they changed the name to Darling and Parlin. After a fire ravaged Fall River in 1928, the firm earned several commissions to revitalize the affected area. In the 1930s, she worked as a surveyor for the Works Progress Administration.

In addition to completing over one-hundred homes, Darling-Parlin contributed theaters, schools, places of worship, and other public buildings. In Somerset she designed the Brayton House and Jerathmael Bowers House, in Assonet the Barnaby House; in Westport the Waite-Potter House; and in Fall River the Adams House (north wing). Her theaters in Fall River include, Durfee Theater (opened 1929, demolished 1973), Rialto, Capitol, Bijou, Strand, Park, and Empire. The schools she planned are the Bristol County Agricultural School Dormitory, Hector L. Beliele Elementary, and First Baptist Church (Sunday School addition). She worked on the Baptist Temple and Temple Beth EL in Fall River. Other buildings of Fall River, specifically, Mills Building, Sullivan Building, Buffington Building (c1916, Darling-Parlin alone), Mohican Hotel, People's Cooperative Bank, Fall River Trust Company. Also the Women’s Union and the YMCA can be attributed to her.

Darling-Parlin worked on the restoration of the historic Luther Store in Swansea, Massachusetts (now the Swansea Historical Society Museum).

Darling-Parlin retired in 1975, and died four years later. She is buried at Oak Grove Cemetery. Darling-Parlin's drawings are held at the MIT Museum.

== Works ==
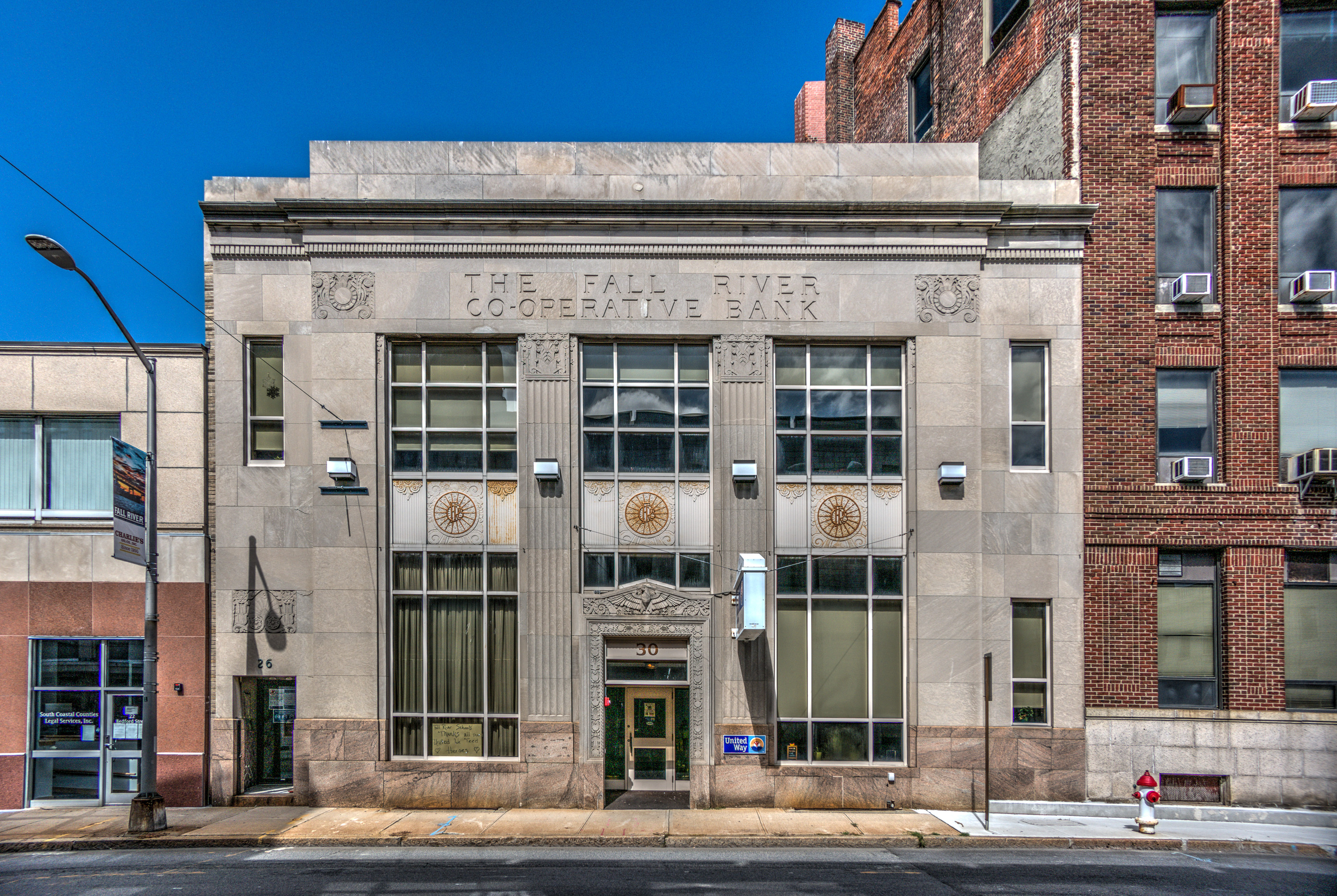
Fall River Cooperative Bank (1929)

- Fall River Cooperative Bank, Fall River (1929)
- Woman's Club of Fall River, Fall River, MA (1925 remodel facade and interior)
- Welcome Home Arch (c. 1920)
- War Department, Newport, Rhode Island (c. 1945)
- Navy Base Officers' Club, Newport, Rhode Island (c. 1945)
