= Luther Store =

- U.S. National Register of Historic Places
- U.S. Historic district – Contributing property
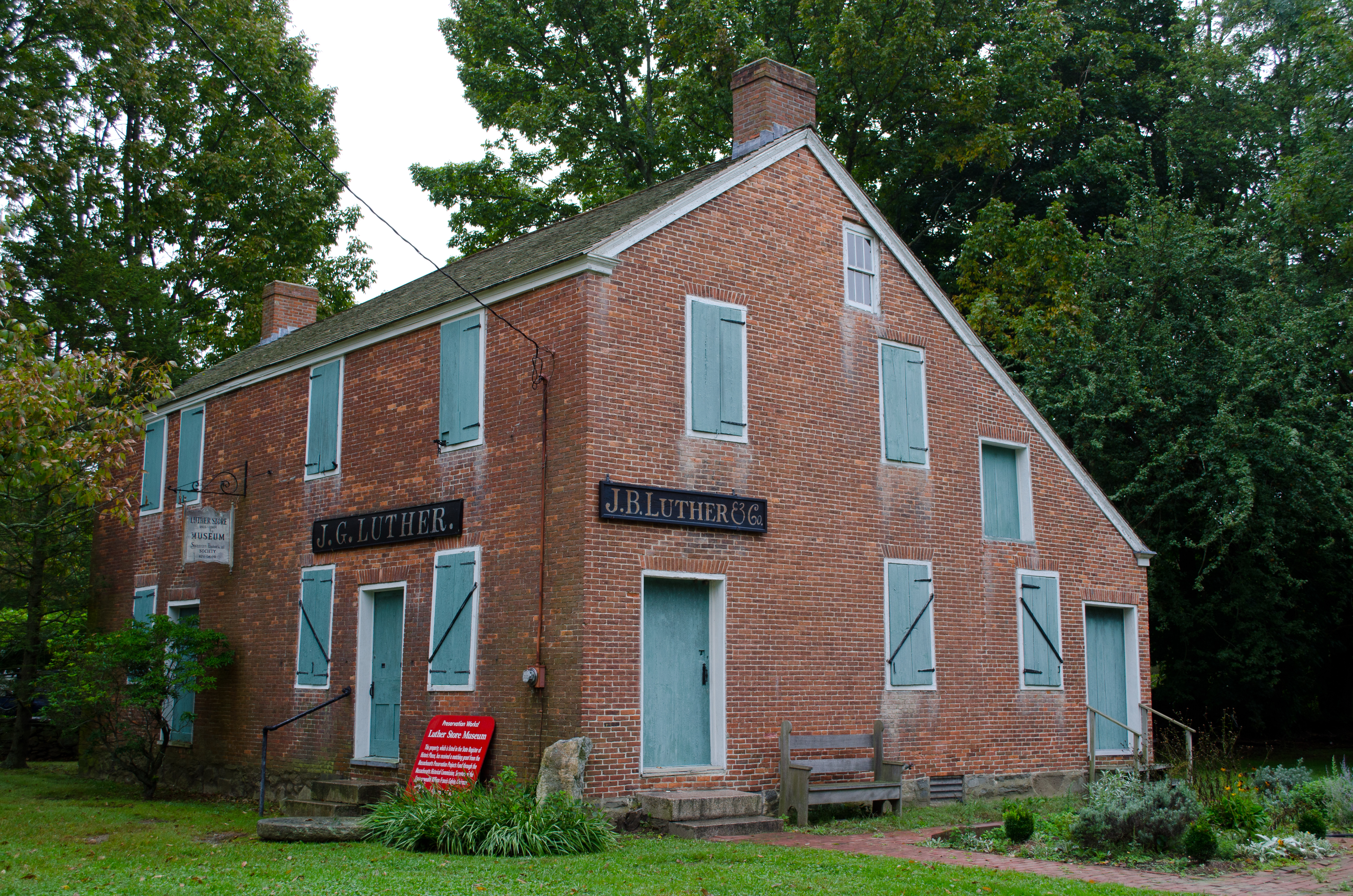

- Location within Massachusetts Location within the United States
- Nearest city: Swansea, Massachusetts
- Coordinates: 41°44′41″N 71°13′25″W
- Built: 1815
- Architect: Mace Luther
- Part of: Luther's Corner (ID90000054)
- NRHP reference No.: 78000438

Significant dates
- Added to NRHP: May 22, 1978
- Designated CP: February 16, 1990

The Luther Store is a historic store at 160 Old Warren Road in Swansea, Massachusetts. It is a 2 1/2-story brick structure with a saltbox profile. Its main facade is five bays wide, with entrances in the second and fourth bays, and interior chimneys at each end. The store retains original fixtures, including solid mahogany counters, drawers for goods storage, and the proprietor's desk. The store was built in 1815 by John Brown Luther, and was operated by the Luther family as a store until 1903. The Luther's Corner area was in the mid-19th century the economic center of Swansea, and Luther's Store served as post office and library. It was acquired in 1941 by the Swansea Historical Society, which now operates it as a local history museum.

Fall River architect Maude Darling-Parlin worked on the restoration of the Luther Store.

The store was listed on the National Register of Historic Places in 1978.

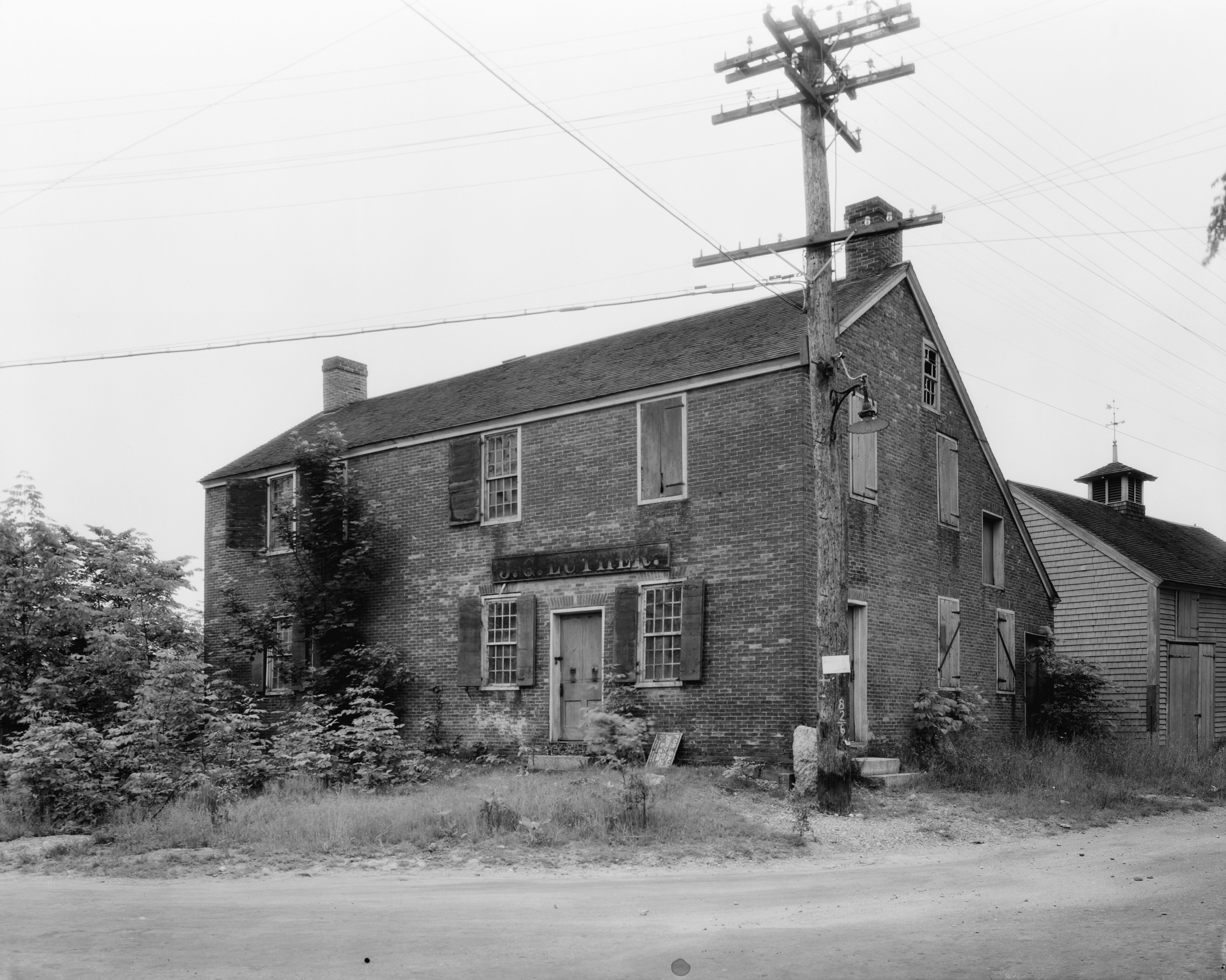
The Luther Store in 1935

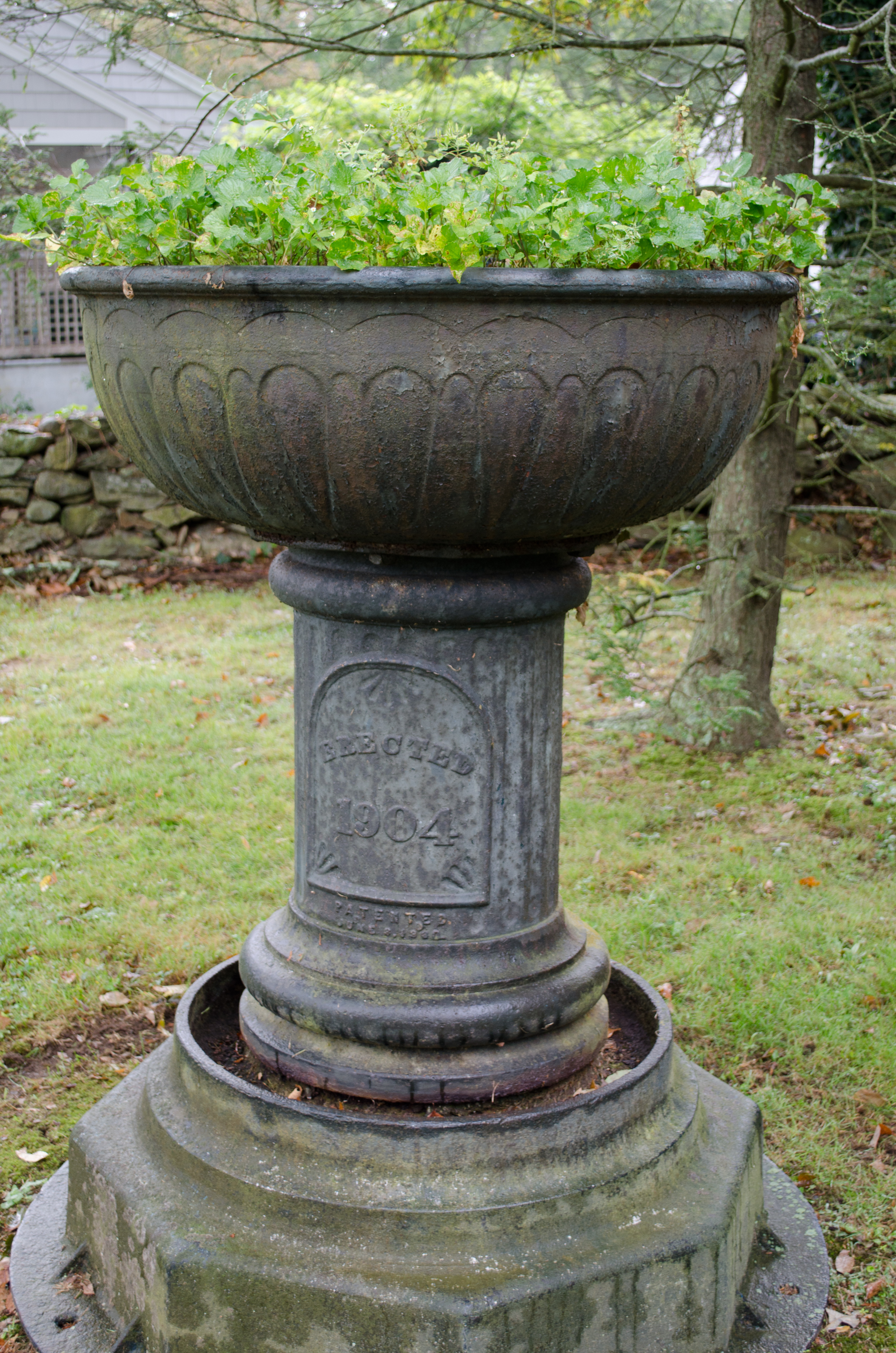

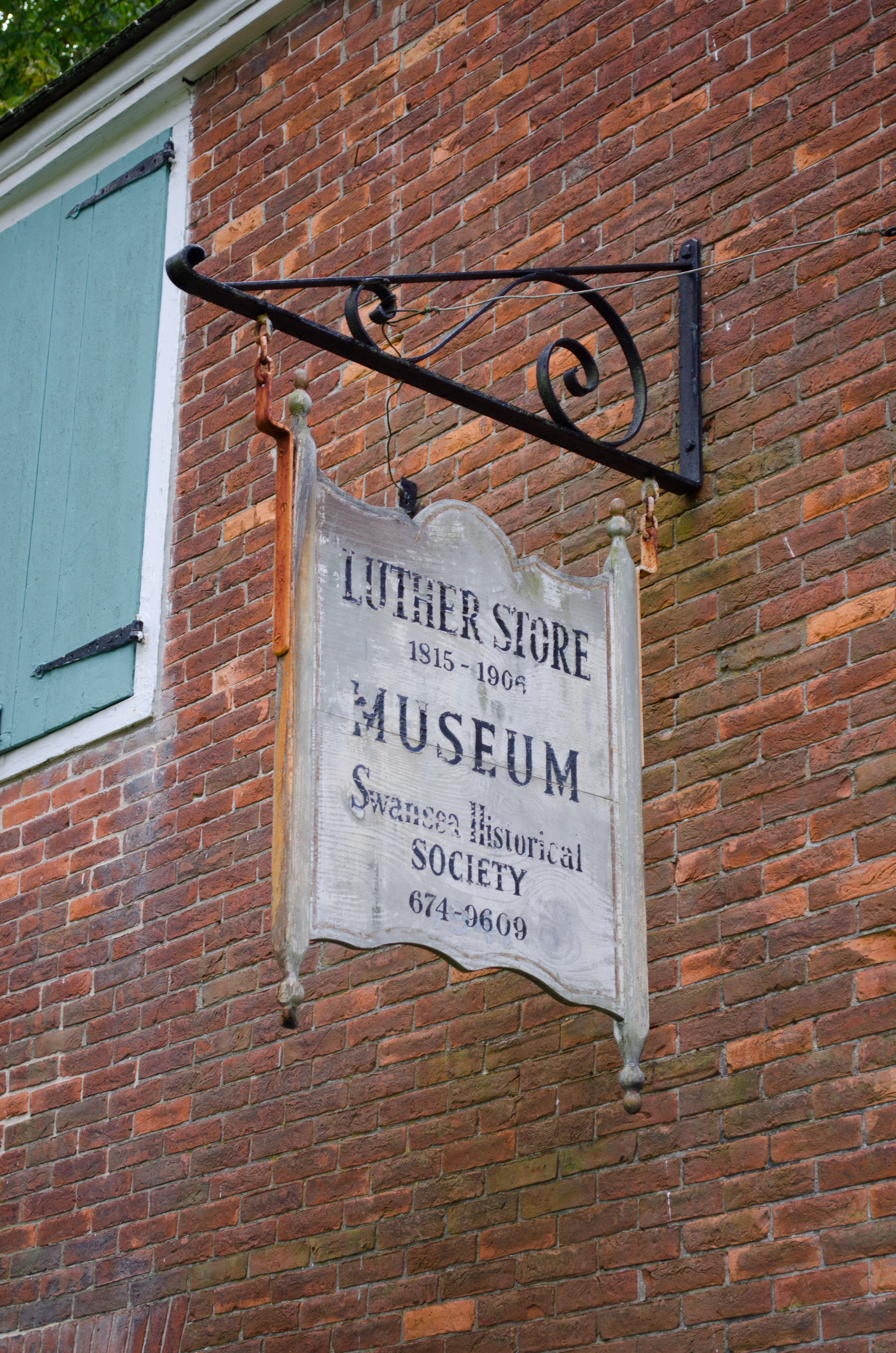

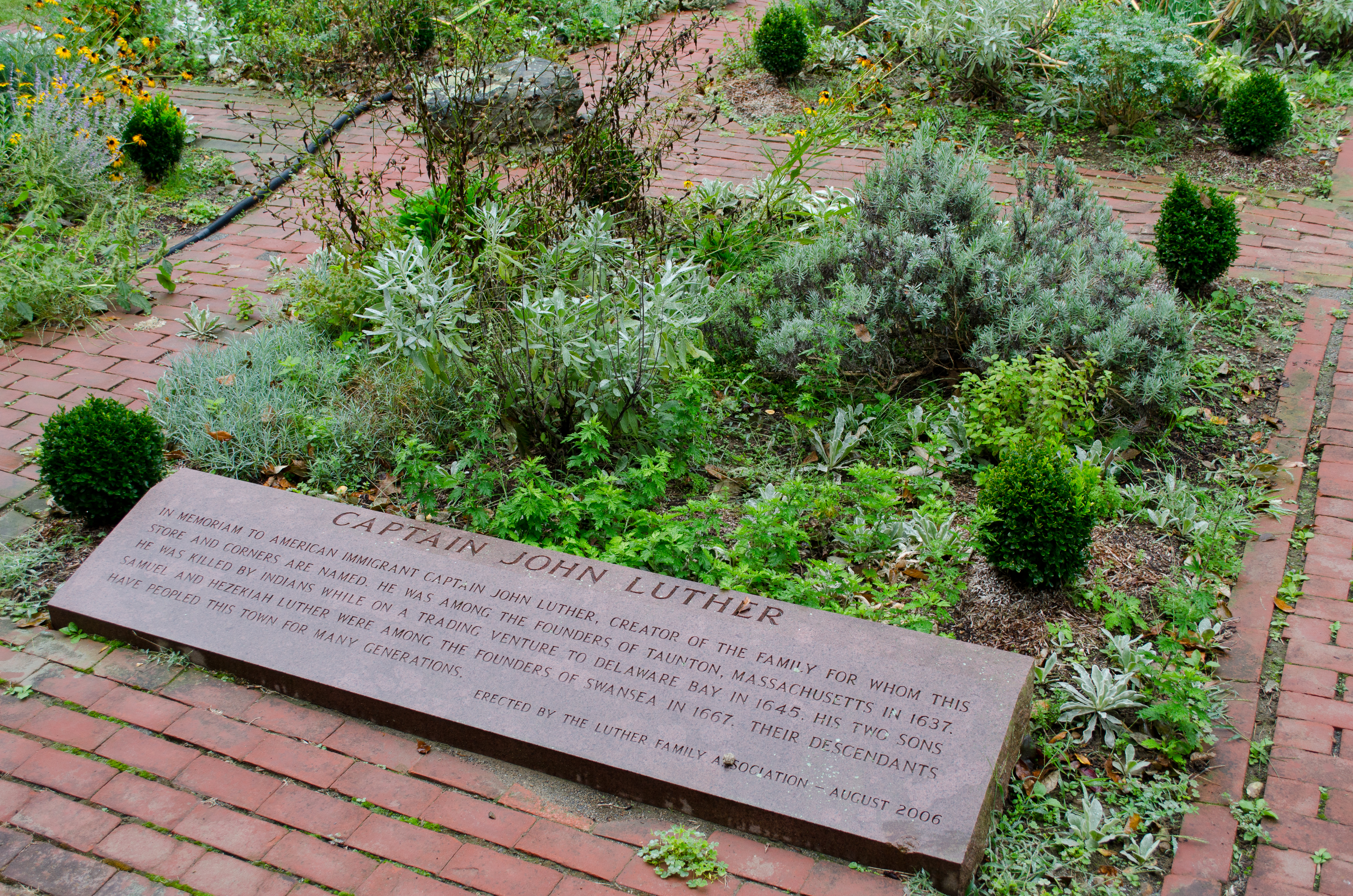
Garden commemorating Captain John Luther

== See also ==
- National Register of Historic Places listings in Bristol County, Massachusetts
