= USS Sovereign (SP-170) =

Patrol vessel of the United States Navy

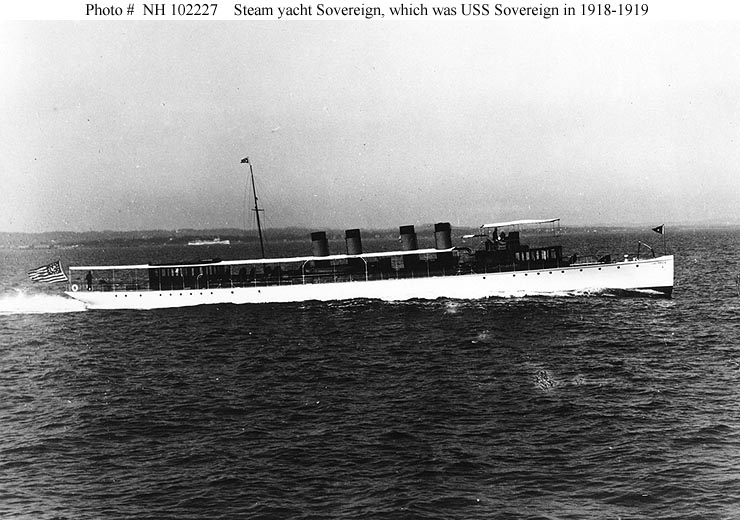
- Sovereign as a civilian yacht sometime between 1911 and 1918, prior to her U.S. Navy service.

History

United States
- Name: USS Sovereign
- Namesake: Previous name retained
- Builder: Charles L. Seabury and Company, Morris Heights, the Bronx, New York
- Completed: 1911
- Acquired: 14 June 1918
- Commissioned: 1918
- Stricken: 23 April 1919
- Fate: Returned to owner 1919
- Notes: Operated as civilian yacht Sovereign 1911-1918 and from 1919

General characteristics
- Type: Patrol vessel
- Tonnage: 173 Gross register tons
- Length: 166 ft (51 m)
- Beam: 16 ft 3 in (4.95 m)
- Draft: 4 ft 6 in (1.37 m) aft
- Depth: 9 ft 4 in (2.84 m)
- Propulsion: Steam turbine, one shaft
- Speed: 29 miles per hour
- Armament: 2 × 3-inch (76.2-millimeter) guns

The second USS Sovereign (SP-170) was an armed yacht that served in the United States Navy as a patrol vessel from 1918 to 1919.

Sovereign was built as a civilian yacht of the same name in 1911 by Charles L. Seabury and Company at Morris Heights in the Bronx, New York, for private use as a pleasure and commuting vessel. Prior to the entry of the United States into World War I in April 1917, Sovereign was registered with the U.S. Navy for potential service in time of war, and the Navy acquired her from the estate of M. C. D. Borden on 14 June 1918 for World War I service as a patrol vessel. She was commissioned as USS Sovereign (SP-170).

Sovereign served the 3rd Naval District as a patrol craft in the New York City area for ten months.

On 23 April 1919, Sovereign was stricken from the Navy List, and soon thereafter she was returned to her owner's estate.
