= First Baptist Church (Fall River, Massachusetts) =

Historic church in Massachusetts, US

- U.S. National Register of Historic Places
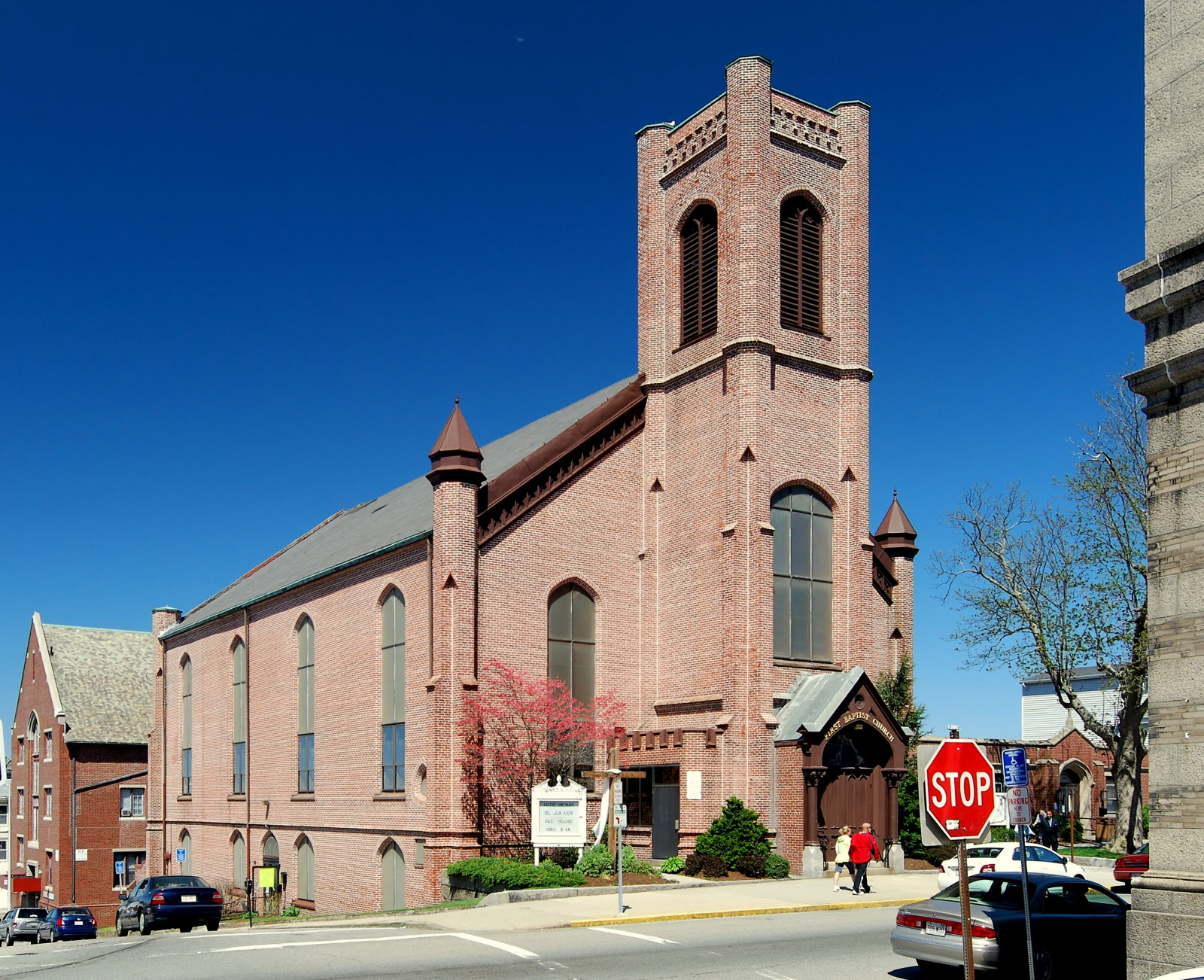

- Location within Massachusetts Location within the United States
- Location: Fall River, Massachusetts
- Coordinates: 41°42′18″N 71°9′20″W
- Built: 1850
- Architect: Brown, Josiah
- Architectural style: Greek Revival
- MPS: Fall River MRA
- NRHP reference No.: 83000668
- Added to NRHP: February 16, 1983

First Baptist Church is a historic church at located 200-228 N. Main Street in Fall River, Massachusetts. The church was built in 1850 and was a work of local architect Josiah Brown. It is built of wood with brick trim in the Gothic Revival style. The tower originally contained a tall spire and corner finials that were destroyed during Hurricane Carol in 1954. In 1871, extensive repairs were made and the Meeting House was enlarged.

It was added to the National Register of Historic Places in 1983.

== See also ==
- National Register of Historic Places listings in Fall River, Massachusetts
