= Border City Mill No. 2 =

- U.S. National Register of Historic Places
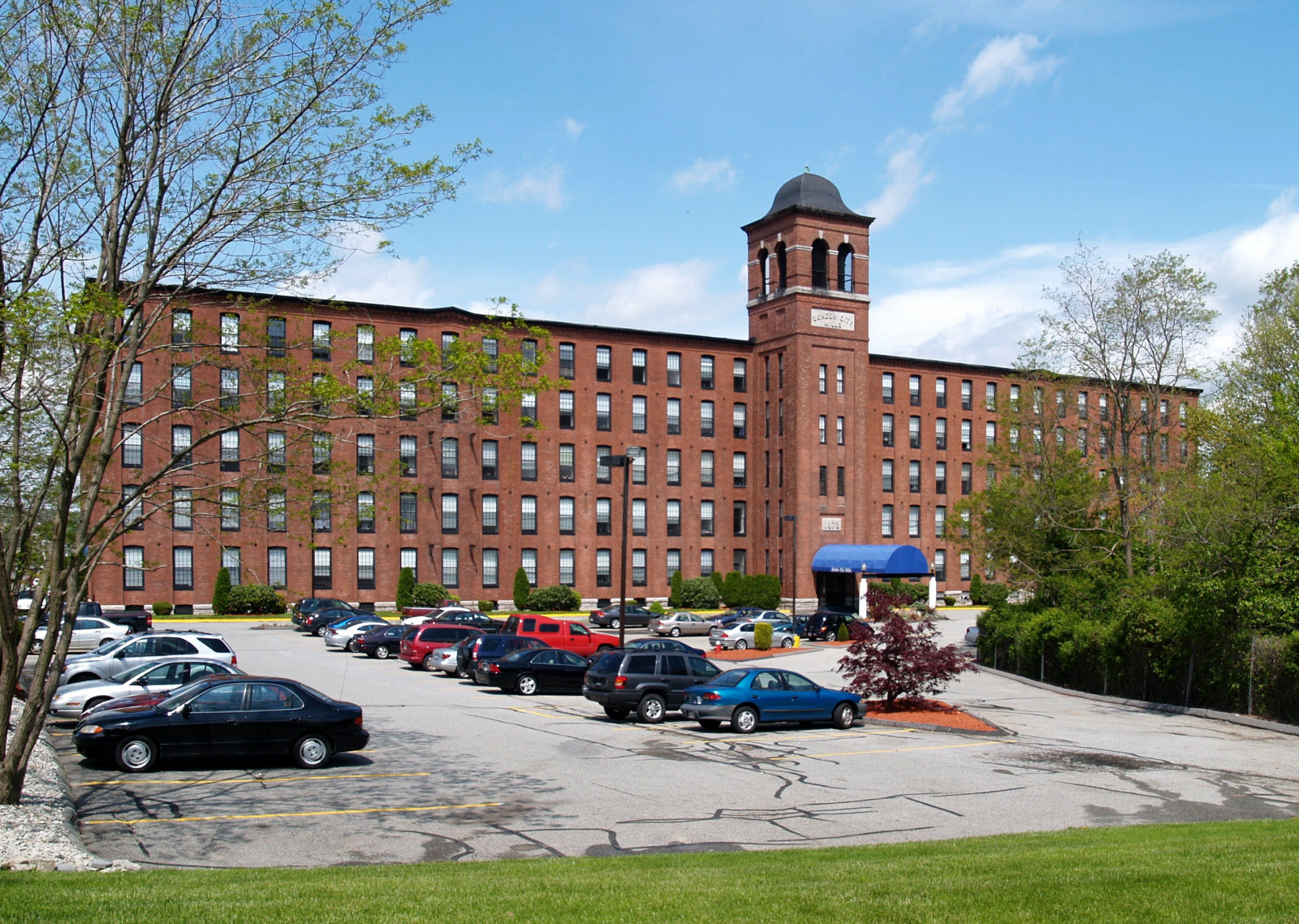

- Location within Massachusetts Location within the United States
- Location: 1 Weaver St., Fall River, Massachusetts
- Coordinates: 41°43′40″N 71°8′29″W
- Built: 1873
- Architect: Brown, Josiah
- Architectural style: Italianate
- MPS: Fall River MRA
- NRHP reference No.: 90000999
- Added to NRHP: June 28, 1990

The Border City Mill No. 2 is a historic cotton textile mill at One Weaver Street in Fall River, Massachusetts. Built in 1873, it is the largest surviving element of the once-sprawling Border City Mill complex. It was designed by Josiah Brown, a prominent local designer of mills, and is one of the city's few brick mills. It was listed on the National Register of Historic Places in 1990. It was converted into residences in the 1980s.

== Description and history ==
Border City Mil No. 2 is located in northwestern Fall River, on the east bank of the Taunton River, from which it is now separated by Massachusetts Route 79. Weaver Street runs just south of the mill. It is a five-story brick building with Italianate features, most prominently in its central tower, which features narrow windows, an open belvedere, and a bellcast roof. One particularly rare surviving feature is a set of six wrought iron fire escapes.

The Border City Mill Company was organized in 1872 by a group of investors from Boston. The company's first president was S. Angier Chace and George T. Hathaway was treasurer. The mill was erected in 1873, the choice of brick dictated by the site's relatively remote access from Fall River's granite quarries. It was also one of the early mills to be built on the Taunton River, most of the city's previous mills having been sited on the Quequechan River. The mill is an early work of Josiah Brown, considered the city's first professional architect.

The company produced primarily shirting and sheeting fabrics. During the financial crisis of 1879, the company was re-organized with John S. Brayton as president. By 1888, the Border City Manufacturing Company was operating in three mills. The company was still operating in 1940.

Mill No. 2 was converted into residential apartments in the 1980s, and was added to the National Register of Historic Places in 1990.

== See also ==
- National Register of Historic Places listings in Fall River, Massachusetts
- List of mills in Fall River, Massachusetts
