= Union Mills (Fall River, Massachusetts) =

- U.S. National Register of Historic Places
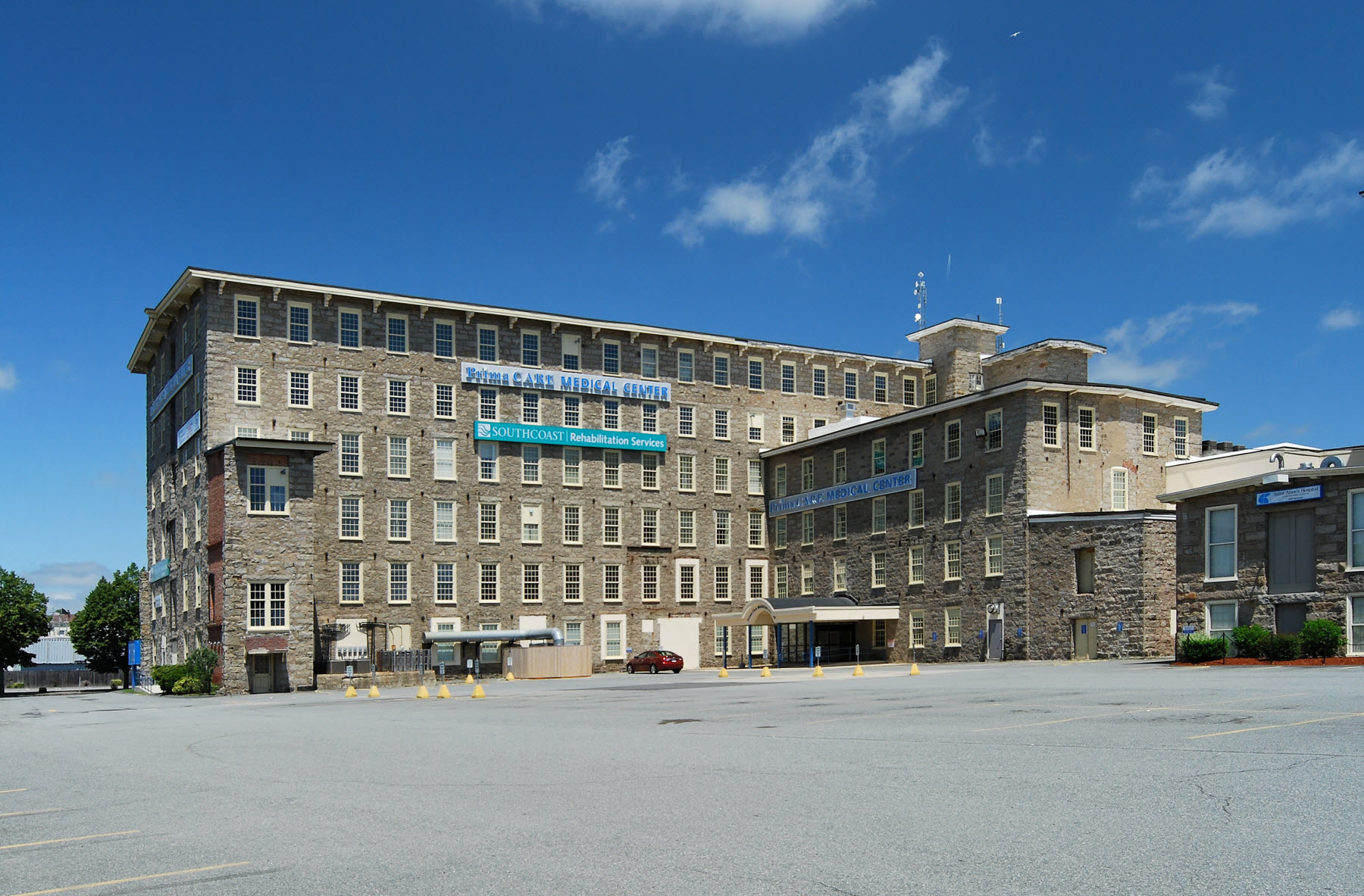
- Union Mill No. 2

- Location within Massachusetts Location within the United States
- Location: Fall River, Massachusetts
- Coordinates: 41°41′44″N 71°8′32″W
- Built: 1859
- Architect: Brown, Josiah; Davol, Wm. C.
- Architectural style: Italianate
- MPS: Fall River MRA
- NRHP reference No.: 83000726
- Added to NRHP: February 16, 1983

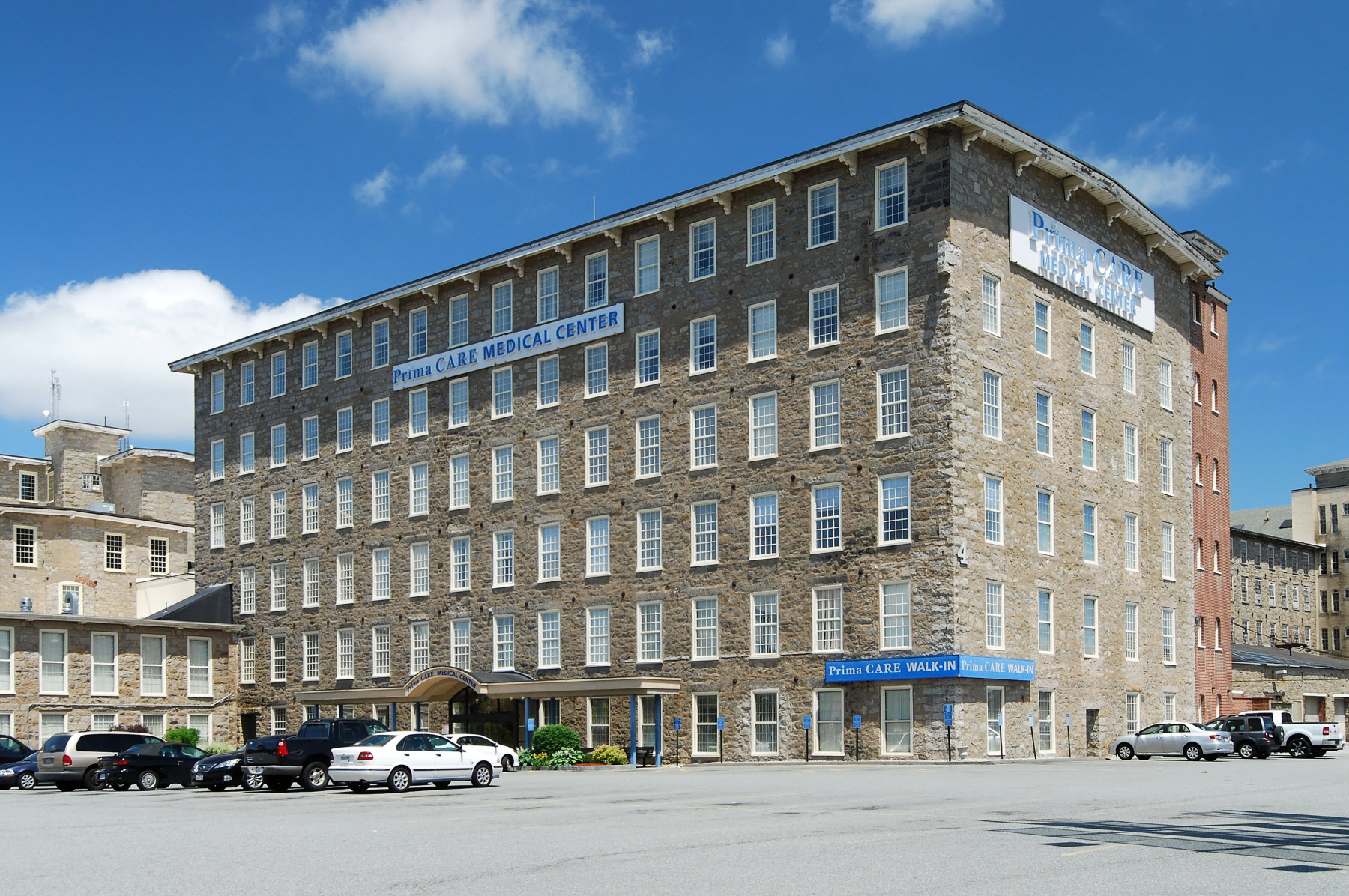
Union Mill No. 1

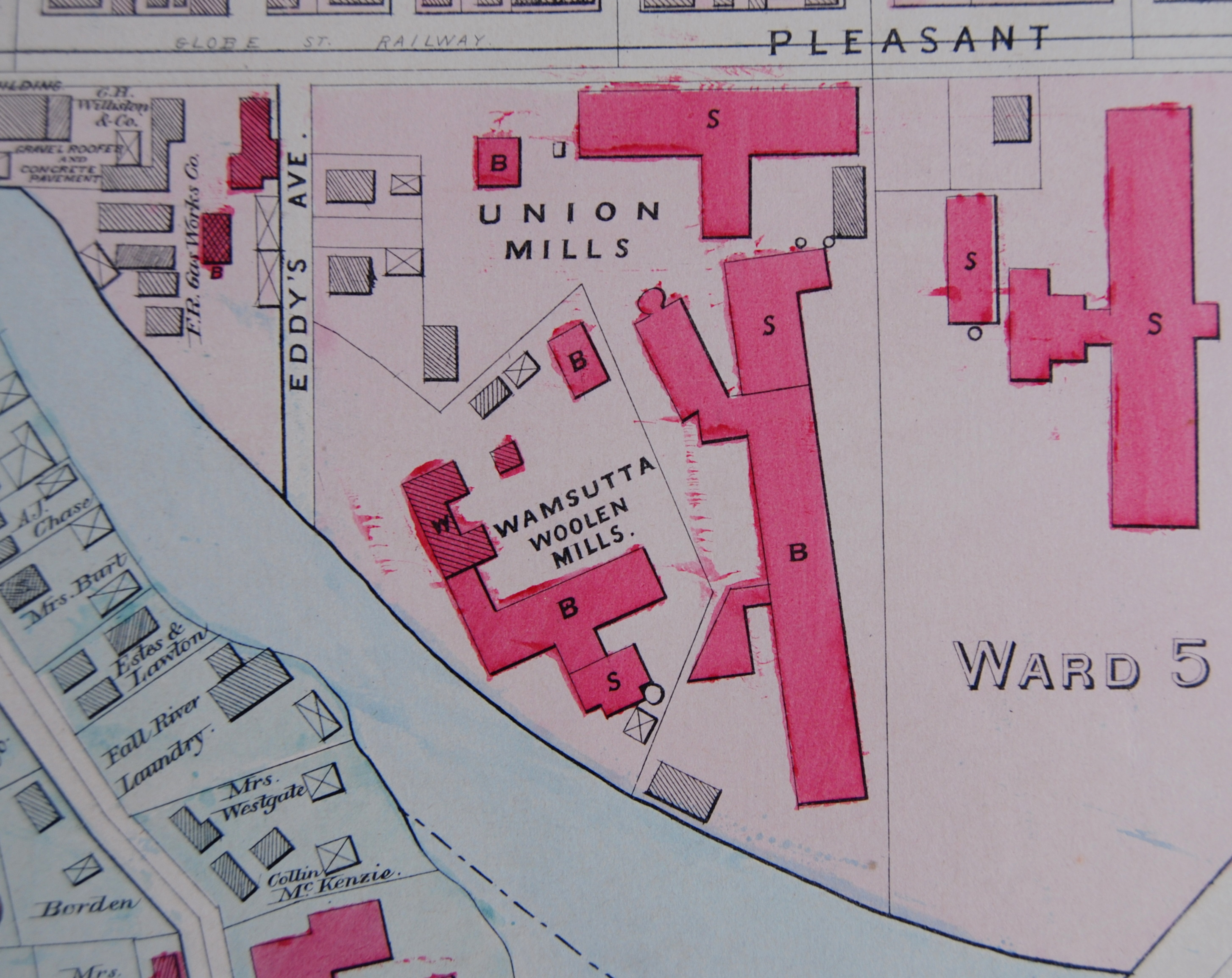
1883 map of Union Mills

Union Mills is a historic textile mill complex located on Pleasant Street in Fall River, Massachusetts.

The Union Mills company was incorporated in 1859, and was the first large steam-powered mill built in the city, having installed Corliss steam engines. The buildings are constructed from local Fall River granite. The company's first president was S. Angier Chace, and David Anthony was the first treasurer. It was the first mill corporation established in the city on the basis of general subscriptions.

In 1865, Mill No. 2 was constructed. In 1876 the original gable roofs of both mills were removed and replaced with flat roofs, thereby adding additional floor space. A third mill was later constructed adjacent to Mill No. 2, but was demolished in the 1960s for the construction of Interstate 195. Production of textiles ceased in 1929.

In 1968 the site was photographed by Jack E. Boucher of the Historic American Buildings Survey, along with the adjacent Durfee Mills, as part of the New England Textile Mill Survey II, led by Robert M. Vogel of the Smithsonian Institution. The site was added to the National Register of Historic Places in 1983.

Over the years, the Union Mills have been occupied by numerous small businesses, including Nate Lions Appliance Warehouse for many years before its move to the nearby Durfee Mills. Both mills have been completely restored and are now the location of Prima CARE Medical Center.

== See also ==
- National Register of Historic Places listings in Fall River, Massachusetts
- List of mills in Fall River, Massachusetts
