= Central Congregational Church (Fall River, Massachusetts) =

Historic church in Massachusetts, United States

- U.S. National Register of Historic Places
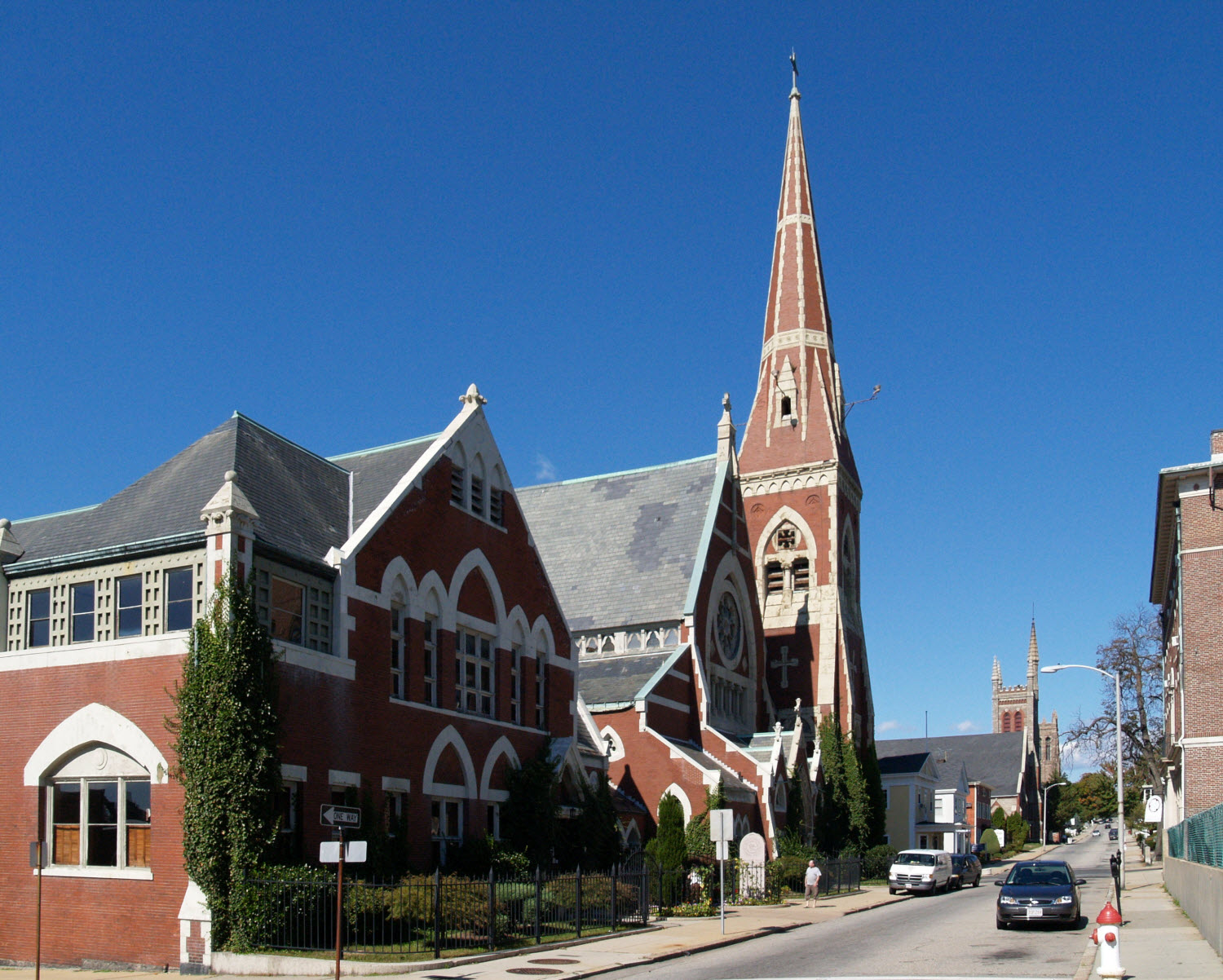

- Location within Massachusetts Location within the United States
- Location: Fall River, Massachusetts
- Coordinates: 41°42′10″N 71°9′14″W
- Built: 1875
- Architect: Hartwell & Swasey
- MPS: Fall River MRA
- NRHP reference No.: 83000646
- Added to NRHP: February 16, 1983

Central Congregational Church is a historic church at 100 Rock Street in Fall River, Massachusetts. It was well known in its early days for being the home church of Lizzie Borden and her family. Borden taught Sunday school in the church. The church has been used by the paranormal team Tennessee Wraith Chasers in attempts to communicate with Borden's ghost.

== History ==
The church was built in 1875 and added to the National Register of Historic Places in 1983. It was designed by Boston architects Hartwell & Swasey, who also designed several other notable buildings in Fall River, including the Academy Building and several city fire stations. It was well known in its early days for being the home church of Lizzie Borden and her family.

In the 1990s and 2000s, the church and abbey were renovated into the International Culinary Academy, with the Abbey Grille and classrooms in the abbey and a large function hall in the main church. The Academy and restaurant closed in March 2009.

In 2019 the church became a venue for events. Weddings and other large events. It is now called The Historic Abbey at 100 Rock Street.

The Hook & Hastings organ was built some time ago. This Hook & Hastings organ is one of the only ones in the area. The organ is located in the main hall.

== In popular culture ==
It was the site used, in the spring of 1993, for the performance segment of the video for "Cryin'" by Aerosmith, who had played the area in the early days. The church was also featured on the first-season episode of Haunted Towns where paranormal team Tennessee Wraith Chasers were the first ones to investigate it, trying to communicate with the ghost of Lizzie Borden who taught Sunday school here.

== See also ==
- National Register of Historic Places listings in Fall River, Massachusetts
- Massasoit Fire House No. 5
- Pocasset Firehouse No. 7
