= Hartwell & Swasey =

American architects

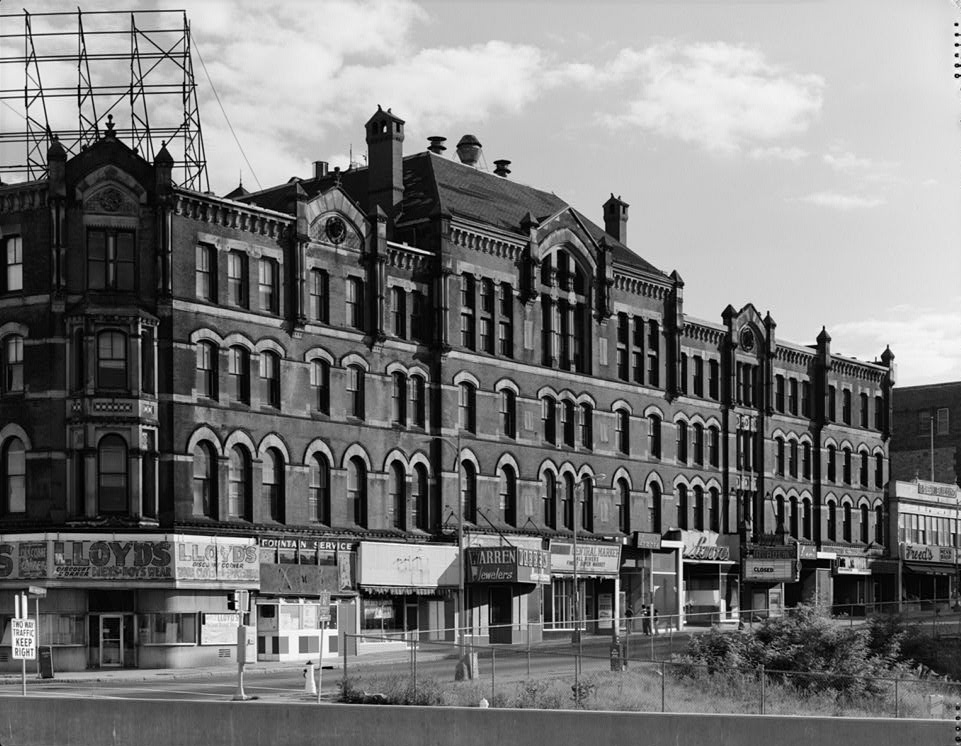
Academy Building, in 1979

Hartwell & Swasey was a short-lived 19th-century architectural firm in Boston, Massachusetts. The partnership between Henry W. Hartwell (1833-1919) and Albert E. Swasey, Jr. lasted from the late-1860s to 1877, when Swasey went on his own. In 1881, Hartwell formed a partnership with William C. Richardson – Hartwell and Richardson – that lasted until his death.

Several of Hartwell & Swasey's buildings were designed in Ruskinian Gothic Revival style, featuring polychrome brick and carved stone details. A number of the firm's works are listed on the U.S. National Register of Historic Places.

== Selected works ==
- Central Fire Station (1869), Leonard and School Sts. Taunton, Massachusetts (Swasey, A. E., Jr.), NRHP-listed
- Central Congregational Church, (1871), 100 Rock Street, Fall River, Massachusetts (Hartwell & Swasey), NRHP-listed
- Dr. Harrison A. Tucker Cottage (1872), 42 Ocean Ave. Oak Bluffs, Massachusetts (Hartwell & Swasey), NRHP-listed
- Anawan No. 6 Firehouse (1873), North Main Street, Fall River, Massachusetts, NRHP-listed, as part of the Highlands Historic District
- Massasoit Fire House No. 5 (1873), 83 Freedom Street, Fall River, Massachusetts (Hartwell & Swasey), NRHP-listed
- Pocasset Firehouse No. 7 (1873), 1058 Pleasant Street, Fall River, Massachusetts (Hartwell & Swasey), NRHP-listed
- Quequechan Firehouse (1873), 330 Prospect Street, Fall River, Massachusetts, NRHP-listed, as part of the Highlands Historic District
- William C. Davol Jr. House (1876), 252 High Street, Fall River, Massachusetts (Hartwell & Swasey), NRHP-listed
- Academy Building (1876), also known as the Borden Block, on S. Main Street, Fall River, Massachusetts (Hartwell & Swasey), NRHP-listed
- Simeon Borden Mansion (1876), 484 Highland Avenue, Fall River, Massachusetts, NRHP-listed, as part of the Highlands Historic District
