= Mary L. Fonseca =

American politician

Mary Leite Fonseca
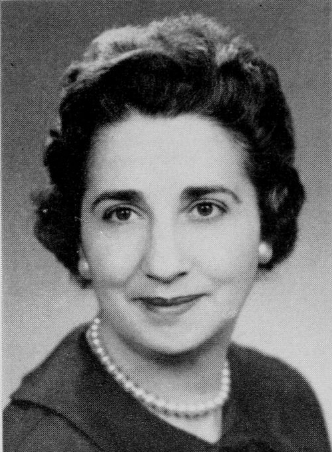

Member of the Massachusetts Senate from the 2nd Bristol district
- In office 1953–1984
- Preceded by: William E. White
- Succeeded by: Thomas C. Norton

Personal details
- Born: Mary Leite; March 30, 1915 Fall River, Massachusetts
- Died: June 13, 2005 (aged 90) Swansea, Massachusetts
- Resting place: St. Patrick's Cemetery, Fall River, Massachusetts
- Party: Democratic
- Spouse: John C. Fonseca Jr.

Mary L. Fonseca (1915–2005) was a Massachusetts state senator who represented the Second Bristol District from 1953 to 1984. As Assistant Majority Leader, she was the first woman to hold a leadership post in the Massachusetts Senate.

Fonseca was known as a strong supporter of working women and public education. In her first senate speech, she successfully argued for an end to discrimination against women teachers in Massachusetts public schools.

== Early life ==
She was born in Fall River, Massachusetts, the daughter of Mary Botelho and José Leite, both Portuguese immigrants. Her father owned a small grocery store on the corner of Webster and Alden Streets. After graduating from Durfee High School in 1932, she wanted to go to college but, as she explained in an interview, "as the oldest girl in a family of 12, I had to go right to work." She worked at the Fall River Public Library, and later as a secretary for the U.S. Census Bureau.

== Political career ==
She first became interested in politics as a teenager, when she accompanied her mother to meetings of the Portuguese-American Civic League. Soon she began taking part in the League's fundraising drives, and organized a Junior Council for young members.

She was elected to the Fall River School Committee in 1945 and served two four-year terms. During her last year on the committee she served as vice chairman. Concerned about rising unemployment in her area, she successfully ran for state senate in 1952, running a low-budget campaign out of her family's modest third-floor apartment. She was the first woman to represent the Second Bristol District in the senate, the first Portuguese-American woman elected to the Massachusetts Senate, and possibly the first Portuguese-American woman to be elected to any legislative seat in the United States. As Assistant Majority Leader (or Majority Whip) from 1973 to 1984, she was also the first woman to hold a leadership post in the Massachusetts senate.

Fonseca earned a reputation as a champion of women and public education. In her "maiden speech" on the senate floor, she argued in support of a bill ending discrimination against married women teachers:

There are only two bachelors and three women in the Massachusetts State Senate. That means out of 40 senators, 35 of you are going to have to make a determination before we leave here today as to whether or not your wives became less competent the day they married you. When a male teacher gets married, his pay is not lowered, nor are his annual leave and pension rights taken from him, yet there is a double standard where women are concerned. Why?

After having been voted down repeatedly for years, the bill finally passed. Fonseca went on to chair the Senate Committee on Education, and was a strong supporter of Southeastern Massachusetts University (now the University of Massachusetts at Dartmouth) and Bristol Community College in Fall River. In 1974 she successfully argued in favor of tax deductions for working mothers' daycare expenses.

== Personal life ==
She married John C. Fonseca Jr., an insurance company employee, in 1948. The couple had two children, John and Irene. Her husband died in 1970.

She was active in many civic and charitable organizations, including the Business and Professional Women's Foundation, the National Order of Women Legislators, the Portuguese-American Civic League, the Salvation Army Women's Auxiliary, and the Holy Name Women.

Towards the end of her life Fonseca suffered from Alzheimer's disease. She died of a heart attack in the County Gardens Nursing Home in Swansea, Massachusetts. Mary L. Fonseca Elementary School in Fall River is named in her honor.

== See also ==
- 1955–1956 Massachusetts legislature
