= High, Church and Gould Streets Historic District =

Historic district in Massachusetts, United States

- U.S. National Register of Historic Places
- U.S. Historic district
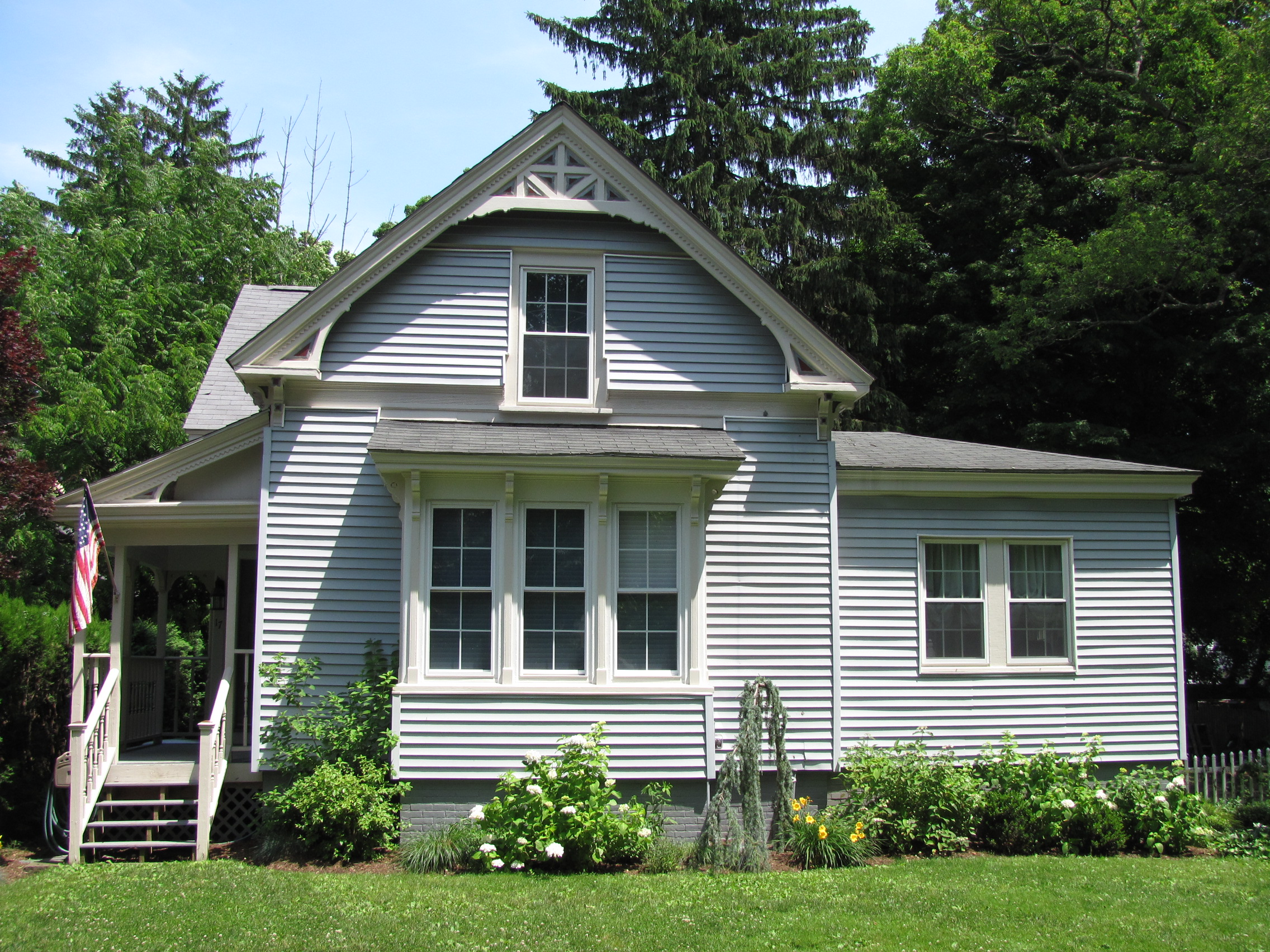
- 17 Gould Street

- Location within Massachusetts Location within the United States
- Location: North Attleborough, Massachusetts
- Coordinates: 41°58′59.8″N 71°20′07″W
- Area: 20 acres (8.1 ha)
- Architect: Frank W. Angell; Albert Harkness
- Architectural style: Greek Revival, Queen Anne
- NRHP reference No.: 99001305
- Added to NRHP: November 12, 1999

The High, Church and Gould Streets Historic District is a historic district at 56-60-122 High Street, 29-117 Church Street, and 9-17 Gould Street in North Attleborough, Massachusetts. This area was developed in the mid to late 19th century as a residential area serving businessmen and professionals, predominantly those associated with North Attleborough's dominant jewelry industry. Its first main phase of growth was between about 1832 and 1855, and it experienced its most significant growth after the American Civil War and the arrival of the railroad.

The district includes buildings designed by Providence architects Frank W. Angell and Albert Harkness.

The district was added to the National Register of Historic Places in 1999.

== See also ==
- National Register of Historic Places listings in Bristol County, Massachusetts
