= Academy Building (Fall River, Massachusetts) =

- U.S. National Register of Historic Places
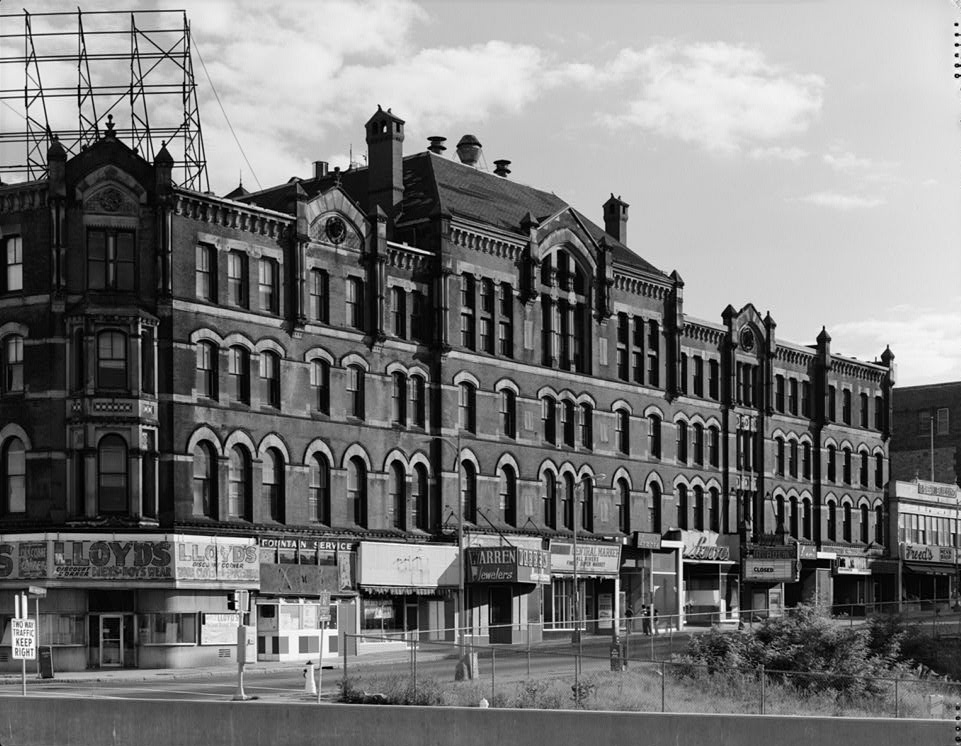
- Academy Building, 1979

- Location within Massachusetts Location within the United States
- Location: 102 S. Main St., Fall River, Massachusetts
- Coordinates: 41°42′3″N 71°9′20″W
- Built: 1876
- Architect: Hartwell & Swazey
- Architectural style: Gothic
- NRHP reference No.: 73000277
- Added to NRHP: July 2, 1973

Academy Building (also known as "Academy of Music Building" or "Borden Block") is a historic building in Fall River, Massachusetts. The building was constructed in 1875 as a memorial to Nathaniel Briggs Borden by his family. It opened its doors on January 6, 1876. It was added to the National Register of Historic Places in 1973.

== History ==
The building is located on land once owned by Nathaniel Briggs Borden, an early Fall River businessman and politician who died in 1865. The building was designed as a memorial to him by his widow Lydia and his three adult children, Simeon, Nathaniel, Jr. and Louisa Borden Aldrich. The family obtained the services of noted Boston architects H.W. Hartwell and A.E. Swasey, who had previously designed several notable buildings in Fall River, including the Central Congregational Church on Rock Street and Simeon's mansion on Highland Avenue. Like these other structures, the Borden Block was also designed in the Ruskinian Gothic Revival style, featuring polychrome brick and carved stone details.

The four-story building was constructed by the Hull Brothers of Providence. Their initial cost estimate was $260,000. However, the cost of the building escalated during construction, largely attributed to foundation problems. Large mortgages were obtained by the Borden family from local banks. Shares in the building were also sold to several local businessmen. By July 1882, the three Borden siblings no longer owned the building.

At the time of its 1876 opening, the building's theatre boasted the second largest theatre in Massachusetts. The first program, on January 6, 1876, featured the Theodore Thomas Orchestra. Later, the theatre hosted the Boston Symphony Orchestra numerous times during the 1880s. The theatre also hosted various drama and comedy stage acts from the time that it opened well into the early 20th century, the motion pictures began to be shown. The building was also used for grand balls, political rallies and other events.

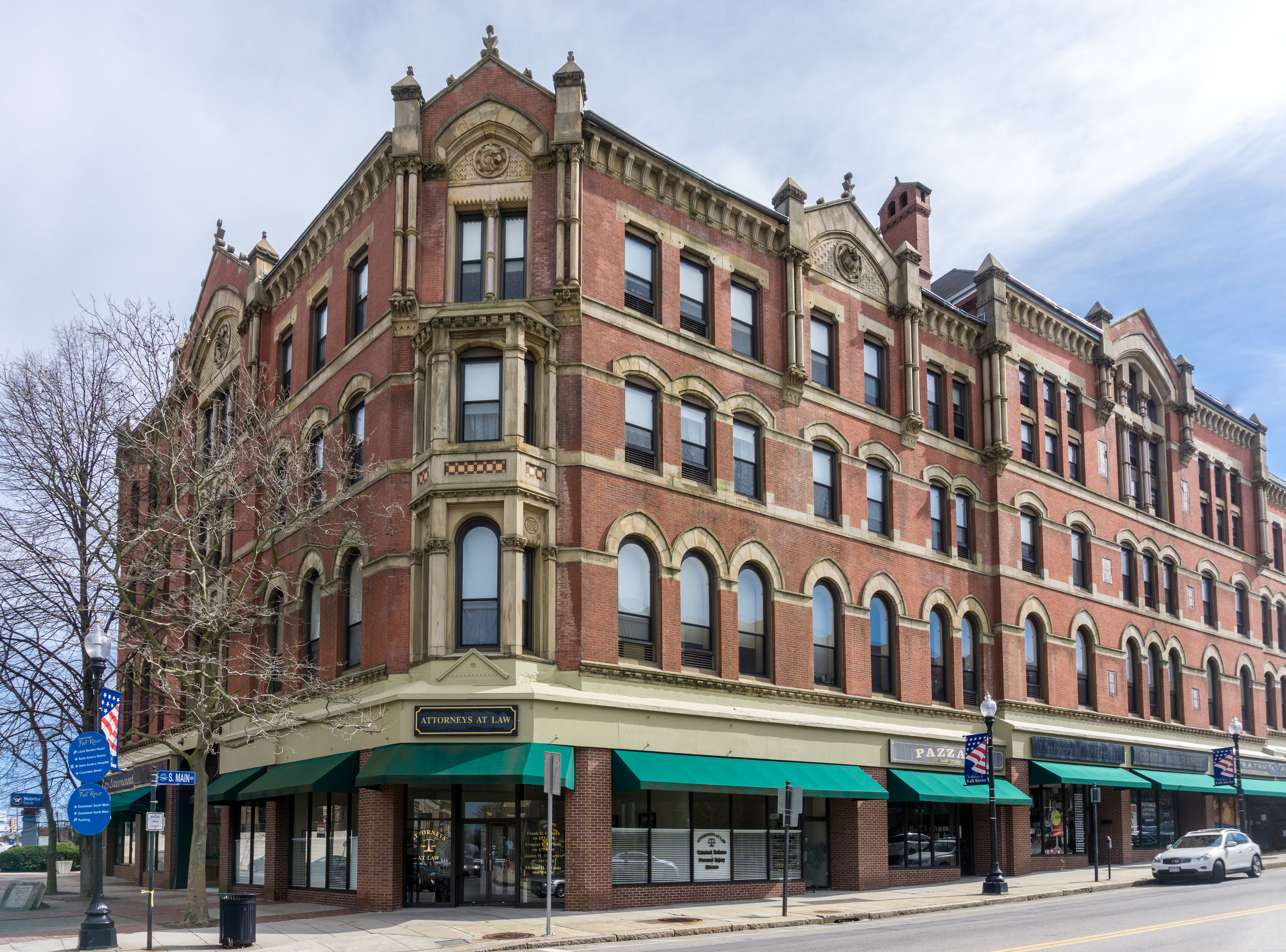
The Academy Building in 2017

In addition to the theatre, the building's original design included commercial shops at street level and numerous offices in its upper levels.

The Borden Block contained the city's first telephone exchange from 1879 to 1890, when it was relocated to its own building.

In 1910, William J. Dunn became the sole owner of the building. In 1946, the Dunn heirs leased the building to Zeitz Theatre Company. It reopened in November 1946 after extensive renovations. During the 1960s and 1970s, the building fell into disrepair. It was acquired by the Fall River Redevelopment Authority in 1973, which had planned to demolish the building.

In 1979, the Academy Building was photographed as part of the Historic American Buildings Survey. During the 1980s, the building was restored. The theatre portion of the building was removed. Today the building is primarily occupied by senior apartments, with retail spaces at street level along South Main Street.

== See also ==
- National Register of Historic Places listings in Fall River, Massachusetts
- Massasoit Fire House No. 5
- Pocasset Firehouse No. 7
