= William C. Davol Jr. House =

Historic house in Massachusetts, United States

- U.S. National Register of Historic Places
- U.S. Historic district – Contributing property
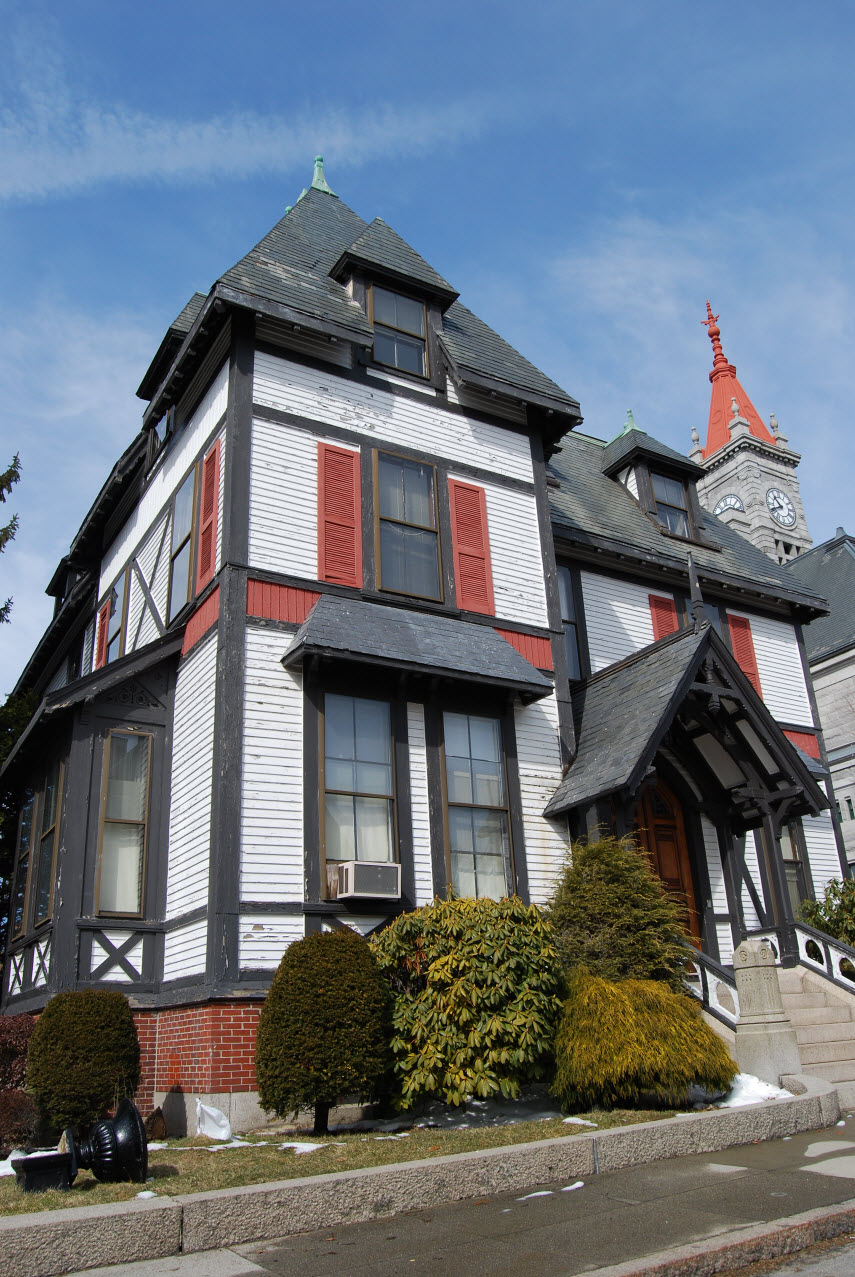

- Location within Massachusetts Location within the United States
- Location: 252 High St., Fall River, Massachusetts
- Coordinates: 41°42′50″N 71°9′10″W
- Built: 1876
- Architect: Hartwell & Swasey
- Architectural style: Stick/Eastlake
- Part of: Lower Highlands Historic District (ID84002171)
- MPS: Fall River MRA
- NRHP reference No.: 83004286

Significant dates
- Added to NRHP: February 16, 1983
- Designated CP: January 10, 1984

The William C. Davol Jr. House is a historic house located at 252 High Street in Fall River, Massachusetts.

== Description and history ==
It was built in 1876 for William C. Davol Jr., treasurer of the Davol Mills. The house was designed by Boston architects Hartwell & Swasey, whose works included numerous other public buildings and private homes in Fall River during this period.

The house has the characteristics of asymmetrical massing and irregular silhouette of Stick/Eastlake architecture and retains its peaked entrance porch, original carved double-leaved entrance doors, stained glass window, slate roof and copper coping and finials. The interior is richly embellished with Minton tiles and Eastlakian trim and sports an original water-power elevator.

The house was added to the National Register of Historic Places in 1983. It is also located within the Lower Highlands Historic District.

== See also ==
- National Register of Historic Places listings in Fall River, Massachusetts
