= Massasoit Fire House No. 5 =

- U.S. National Register of Historic Places
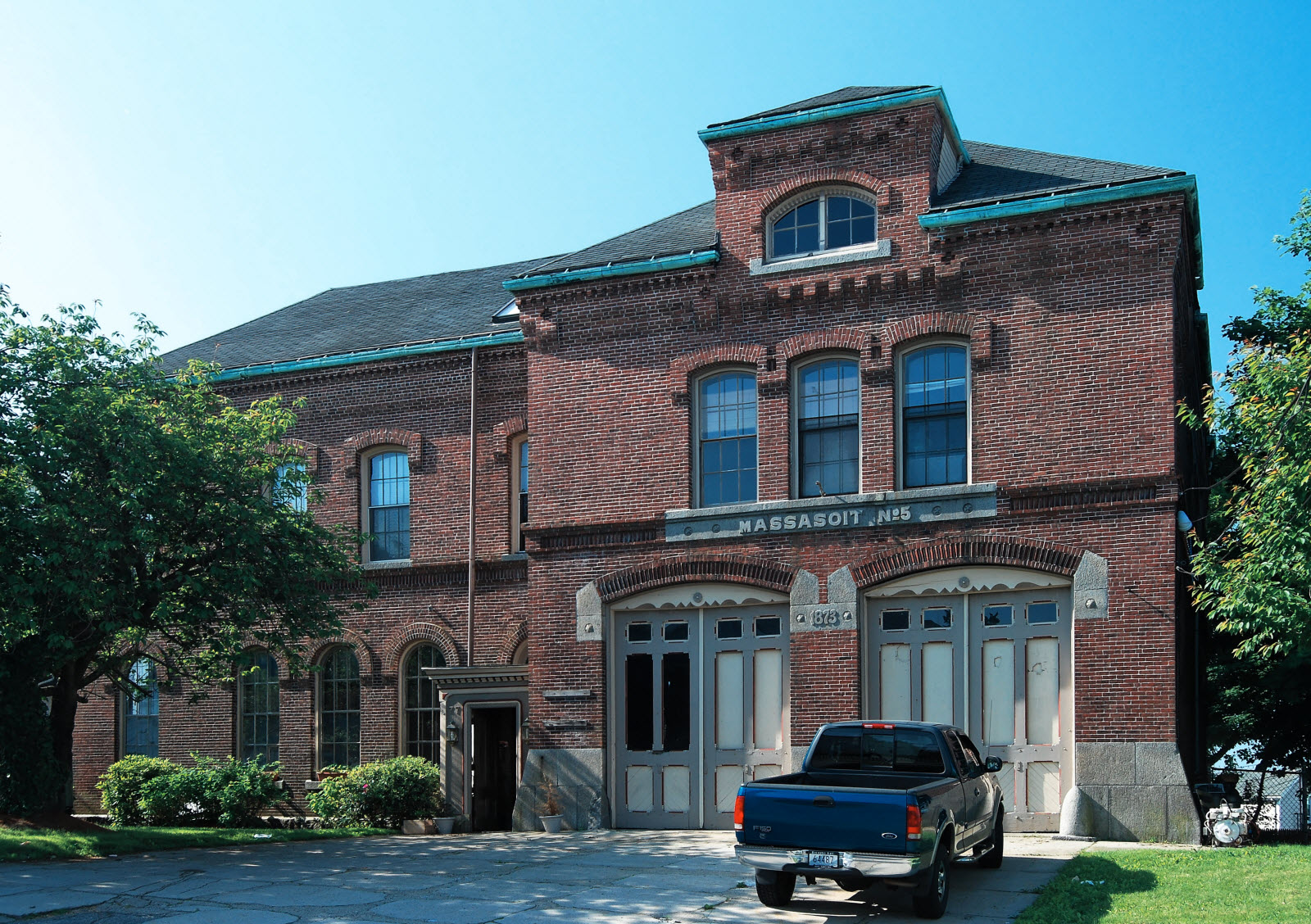

- Location within Massachusetts Location within the United States
- Location: 83 Freedom Street, Fall River, Massachusetts
- Coordinates: 41°41′22″N 71°10′9″W
- Built: 1873
- Architect: Hartwell & Swasey
- Architectural style: Gothic
- MPS: Fall River MRA
- NRHP reference No.: 83000692
- Added to NRHP: February 16, 1983

Massasoit Fire House No. 5 is a historic former fire station located in Fall River, Massachusetts.

The building was designed by Boston architects Hartwell & Swasey and was built in 1873. This same firm also designed several other extant fire stations in Fall River during this period, including the Quequechan No. 1, Anawan No. 6 and Pocasset Firehouse No. 7. The building was originally designed to also contain a police station.

The firehouse was built to serve the Globe Village section of the city. It has since been replaced by the Globe/Kosior Fire Station on Globe Street.

It was added to the National Register of Historic Places in 1983. It now contains residential apartments.

== See also ==
- Academy Building
- National Register of Historic Places listings in Fall River, Massachusetts
- Pocasset Firehouse No. 7
- Quequechan No. 1 and Anawan No. 6 are part of the Highlands Historic District
