= Frank W. Angell =

American architect

Frank Wilson Angell
- Born: May 7, 1851; Providence, Rhode Island
- Died: December 16, 1943 (aged 92); Cranston, Rhode Island
- Occupation: Architect
- Practice: Gould & Angell; Gould, Angell & Swift; Angell & Swift; F. W. Angell

Frank W. Angell (May 7, 1851 – December 16, 1943) was an American architect practicing in Providence, Rhode Island.

== Life and career ==
Frank Wilson Angell was born May 7, 1851, in Providence, Rhode Island, to Avery F. Angell, a dentist, and Cynthia (Day) Angell. He trained as a carpenter, but in 1872 he entered the office of Providence architects Walker & Gould as a draftsman.

By 1880, he had become a prominent designer and was permitted by the partners to take his own commissions. In January 1881, he and Thomas J. Gould left the firm, which would become William R. Walker & Son. The two formed a new partnership, Gould & Angell. In 1893 they added designer Frank H. Swift to the partnership, which became Gould, Angell & Swift. Gould retired from the firm in 1897, and began practicing alone. Angell & Swift continued in practice until 1934, Swift's death. Afterwards, Angell entered semi-retirement, taking occasional work at an office in his Pawtuxet home. Upon his death, Angell was Rhode Island's oldest architect.

Frank W. Angell was related to Providence and New York architect Edward L. Angell.

== Architectural works ==
=== Gould & Angell, 1881–1893 ===
Year	Building	Address	City	State	Notes	Image	Reference
1881	Pratt, Read & Company Mill	92 Main St	Deep River	Connecticut			
1882	William Gammell, Jr. House	170 Hope St	Providence	Rhode Island	Demolished.		
1882	Union Block	Main and Union Sts	Putnam	Connecticut	Demolished.		
1883	Blackstone Hall	172-178 Washington St	Providence	Rhode Island	Demolished.		
1883	Hebronville M. E. Church	1188 S Main St	Hebronville, Attleboro	Massachusetts			
1883	Elizbeth E. Gammell Duplex	74-80 Benevolent St	Providence	Rhode Island			
1883	Narragansett Boat Club	River Rd	Providence	Rhode Island	Burned in 1890.		
1883	Benjamin Stanley House	66 Stanley St	North Attleborough	Massachusetts			
1883	Stephen Stanley House	327 Towne St	North Attleborough	Massachusetts			
1883	J. Edward Studley House	451 Broadway	Providence	Rhode Island			
1883	Hardin C. Waters House	114 Almy St	Providence	Rhode Island			
1885	Hope Club	6 Benevolent St	Providence	Rhode Island			
1885	Murray Universalist Church	S Main and County Sts	Attleboro	Massachusetts	Demolished.		
1885	Joseph G. Birch House	49 Princeton Ave	Providence	Rhode Island			
1886	Ezekiel Owen House	35 Larch St	Providence	Rhode Island			
1886	Francis J. Phillips House	71 Manning St	Providence	Rhode Island			
1886	Charles W. Smith House	325 Angell St	Providence	Rhode Island			
1886	Benjamin J. Thurston House	30 Stimson Ave	Providence	Rhode Island			
1887	Frank P. Comstock House	118 Comstock Ave	Providence	Rhode Island			
1887	John A. Cross House	36 Stimson Ave	Providence	Rhode Island			
1888	Frank W. Angell House	33 Seaview Ave	Pawtuxet, Cranston	Rhode Island	The architect's own home.		
1888	Charles L. Eaton House	347 Broadway	Providence	Rhode Island			
1888	Low Estate Company Building	93 Eddy St	Providence	Rhode Island			
1888	Hazen S. Magoun House	1693 Lonsdale Ave	Lonsdale, Lincoln	Rhode Island			
1888	Edward A. Potter House	24 Taber Ave	Providence	Rhode Island			
1888	Swarts Building	87 Weybosset St	Providence	Rhode Island	Home to the Angell offices. Demolished.		
1889	Auburn Free Baptist Church	1275 Elmwood Ave	Auburn, Cranston	Rhode Island	Enlarged and altered.		
1889	John E. Kendrick, Jr. House	433 Broadway	Providence	Rhode Island			
1889	Fletcher S. Mason House	20 Taber Ave	Providence	Rhode Island			
1889	Oddfellows' Hall	65 Warren Ave	East Providence	Rhode Island			
1889	John H. Tucker House	231 George St	Providence	Rhode Island			
1890	H. Martin Brown House	295 Angell St	Providence	Rhode Island			
1890	Gordon Reed House	Post Rd	Cowesett, Warwick	Rhode Island	Demolished.		
1891	Hazard Memorial Building	1057 Kingstown Rd	Peace Dale, South Kingstown	Rhode Island			
1891	Friedman Hall	Brown University	Providence	Rhode Island	Renovated 2018.		
1892	George C. Arnold House	238 Adelaide Ave	Providence	Rhode Island			
1892	Louis E. Robertson House	60 Stimson Ave	Providence	Rhode Island			

=== Gould, Angell & Swift, 1893–1897 ===
Year	Building	Address	City	State	Notes	Image	Reference
1893	Conant Building	286-288 Main St	Pawtucket	Rhode Island	Demolished.		
1893	George Frost House	223 Neponset Ave	Dorchester, Boston	Massachusetts	Demolished in 2005.		
1893	Providence Athletic Association	200 Weybosset St	Providence	Rhode Island	Later a hotel, then a dormitory for Johnson & Wales University. Demolished in 1992.		
1894	William C. Dart House	18 Euclid Ave	Providence	Rhode Island	Demolished in 2013.		
1894	Irving Fisher House	460 Prospect St	New Haven	Connecticut	Demolished in 1970.		
1894	Richards Memorial Library	118 N Washington St	North Attleborough	Massachusetts			
1894	Frederic E. Snow House	523 Washington St	Brookline	Massachusetts			
1895	Louis A. Budlong House	2 Euclid Ave	Providence	Rhode Island	Demolished in 2013.		
1895	Charles R. Day House	535 Elmwood Ave	Providence	Rhode Island	Demolished.		
1895	Jones Warehouses	59 Central St	Providence	Rhode Island			
1895	William H. Place House	13 Parkis Ave	Providence	Rhode Island	Demolished.		
1895	James Richardson House	225 George St	Providence	Rhode Island			
1896	Charles D. Bowen House	194 Waterman St	Providence	Rhode Island			
1896	Warren, Salisbury & Nightingale Building	78 Fountain St	Providence	Rhode Island	Demolished.		

=== Angell & Swift, 1897–1934 ===
Year	Building	Address	City	State	Notes	Image	Reference
1897	George N. Alden House	17 Arnold Pl	New Bedford	Massachusetts			
1897	Chalkstone Avenue Primary School	1246 Chalkstone Ave	Providence	Rhode Island			
1897	Charles B. Jenks House	52 Princeton Ave	Providence	Rhode Island			
1897	Charles H. Baker House	67 Stimson Ave	Providence	Rhode Island			
1898	Webster Knight House	118 Princeton Ave	Providence	Rhode Island			
1898	Henry Pearce House	182 George St	Providence	Rhode Island			
1899	Horace E. Remington House	166 Adelaide St	Providence	Rhode Island			
1900	Grove Street Primary School	95 Grove St	Providence	Rhode Island	Demolished after an extended preservation battle.		
1900	Henry W. Harvey House	75 Orchard Ave	Providence	Rhode Island			
1900	Industrial Trust Company Branch	238 Main St	Pawtucket	Rhode Island	Altered beyond recognition.		
1901	Phillips Memorial Baptist Church (old)	565 Pontiac Ave	Auburn, Cranston	Rhode Island			
1901	Ralph Street Primary School	22 Rye St	Providence	Rhode Island			
1901	Frank H. Swift House	37 Whitmarsh St	Providence	Rhode Island	The home of the architect.		
1902	Crompton School	Spring St near Cowesett Ave	Crompton, West Warwick	Rhode Island	Demolished.		
1902	Fall River Country Club	4232 N Main St	Fall River	Massachusetts	Burned in 1909.		
1902	Oakwoods	Wellesley College	Wellesley	Massachusetts	Built as the president's residence, now Weaver House.		
1902	Pawtuxet School	39 S Atlantic Ave	Pawtuxet, Warwick	Rhode Island	Demolished.		
1904	Billings Hall	Wellesley College	Wellesley	Massachusetts	Now part of the Schneider Center.		
1904	Arthur J. Bishop House	211 S Washington St	North Attleborough	Massachusetts			
1905	Observatory Director's House	Wellesley College	Wellesley	Massachusetts			
1906	Harvey E. Clap House	7 Peck St	Attleboro	Massachusetts			
1907	Auburn Grammar School	311 Doric Ave	Auburn, Cranston	Rhode Island	Demolished.		
1907	Roswell Blackinton House	73 High St	North Attleborough	Massachusetts			
1907	South Elmwood School	1612 Elmwood Ave	Auburn, Cranston	Rhode Island	Altered beyond recognition.		
1908	East Street Primary School	28 East St	Providence	Rhode Island	Demolished.		
1909	Lincoln Park School	175 Massachusetts Ave	Lincoln Park, Warwick	Rhode Island			
1909	Oakland Beach School	383 Oakland Beach Ave	Oakland Beach, Warwick	Rhode Island	Demolished.		
1909	Natick School	819 Providence St	Natick, West Warwick	Rhode Island			
1909	Robert F. Noyes House	159 President Ave	Providence	Rhode Island			
1909	Parish House, Episcopal Church of the Ascension	147 Purchase St	Fall River	Massachusetts			
1910	Randall N. Durfee House	19 Highland Ave	Fall River	Massachusetts			
1910	Caroline Hazard House (Scallop Shell)	961 Kingstown Rd	Peace Dale, South Kingstown	Rhode Island	Demolished in 1976.		
1911	Emily C. C. Curtis House	111 High St	North Attleborough	Massachusetts			
1911	Kingston Inn	2590 Kingstown Rd	Kingston, South Kingstown	Rhode Island	A remodeling.		
1913	Fall River Public Library	104 N Main St	Fall River	Massachusetts	Addition of an art gallery.		
1914	Cherry & Webb Building	275 Westminster St	Providence	Rhode Island			
1914	East Greenwich Free Library	82 Peirce St	East Greenwich	Rhode Island			
1915	Walter E. Ensign House	45 Boylston Ave	Providence	Rhode Island			
1915	George G. Reuckert House	32 Boylston Ave	Providence	Rhode Island			
1916	Mrs. David F. Slade House	369 June St	Fall River	Massachusetts			
1916	Stepping Stone Kindergarten	30 Spring St	Peace Dale, South Kingstown	Rhode Island			
1917	Anna and Carrie L. Borden House	492 Rock St	Fall River	Massachusetts			
1917	Jerome C. Borden House (Gooseneck)	274 Ocean Ave	Newport	Rhode Island			
1918	Henry L. Slader House	74 Paterson St	Providence	Rhode Island			
1919	Mannie Isaacs House	60 Humboldt Ave	Providence	Rhode Island			
1921	Northbridge Junior High School	Pleasant St	Whitinsville, Northbridge	Massachusetts			
1922	C. Albert Johnson House	147 Warrington St	Providence	Rhode Island			
1924	South County Hospital	100 Kenyon Ave	Wakefield, South Kingstown	Rhode Island			
1926	R. Z. L. Realty Corporation Building	123 Weybosset St	Providence	Rhode Island			
1931	High Street Bank Building	846 Westminster St	Providence	Rhode Island	Remodeling, demolished.		
1933	Northbridge Junior High School	Pleasant St	Whitinsville, Northbridge	Massachusetts	Additions.		
