= Jones Warehouses =

- U.S. National Register of Historic Places
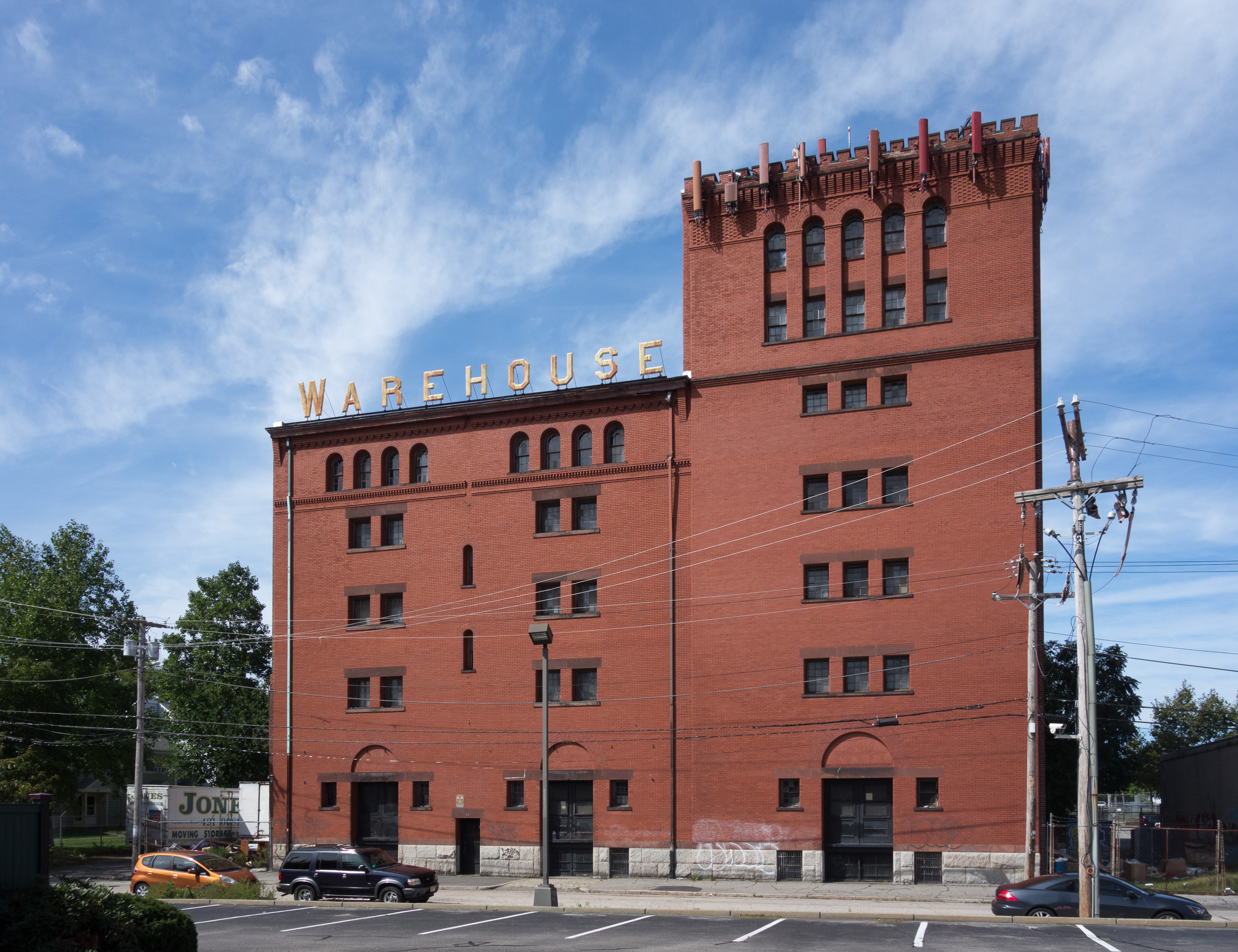

- Location within Rhode Island Location within the United States
- Location: Providence, Rhode Island
- Coordinates: 41°48′50″N 71°25′23″W
- Built: 1861
- Architect: Gould, Angell & Swift
- Architectural style: Romanesque
- MPS: Elmwood MRA
- NRHP reference No.: 80000099
- Added to NRHP: January 7, 1980

The Jones Warehouses are an historic industrial area at 49–63 Central Street in Providence, Rhode Island. It is a complex of five buildings, of which four were built as storage facilities. The fifth building is a 3 1/2-story wood-frame structure with a clerestory roof, built 1861–1865 by Winsor and Brown as a munitions factory; it was converted into a storage facility in the 1890s. This building is one of the oldest factory buildings in the city, its historic structure clearly visible despite the addition of storage vaults. Between 1890 and 1900 three brick buildings, respectively two, five, and seven stories in height, were built behind the old factory building, and are among the oldest purpose-built warehouses in the city. The second of these was designed by the local firm of Gould, Angell & Swift, and exhibits modest Richardsonian Romanesque styling. A five-story reinforced concrete structure was added to the complex around 1927.

The property was listed on the National Register of Historic Places in 1980.

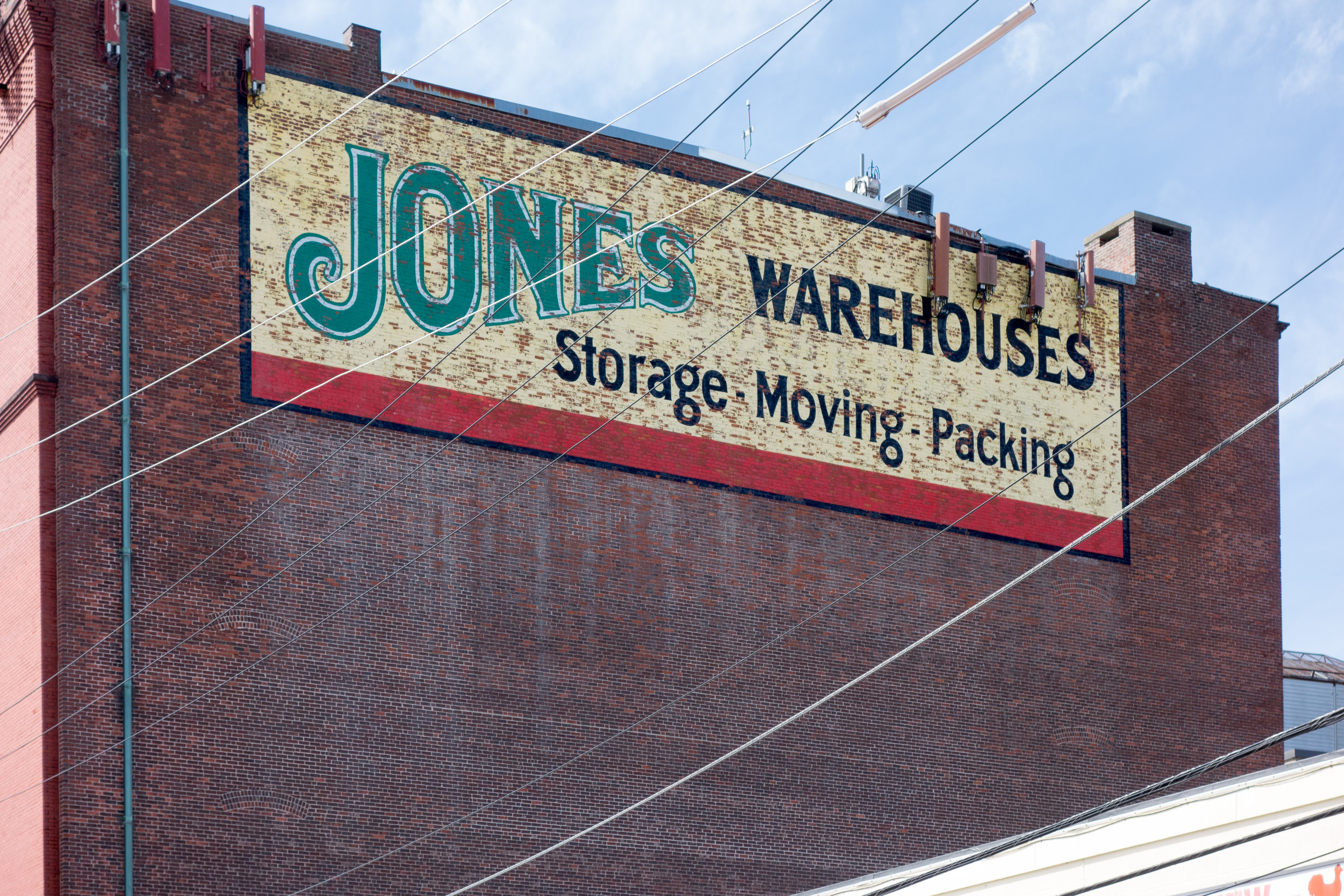
Painted sign

== See also ==
- National Register of Historic Places listings in Providence, Rhode Island
