= Cataract Engine Company No. 3 =

- U.S. National Register of Historic Places
- U.S. Historic district – Contributing property
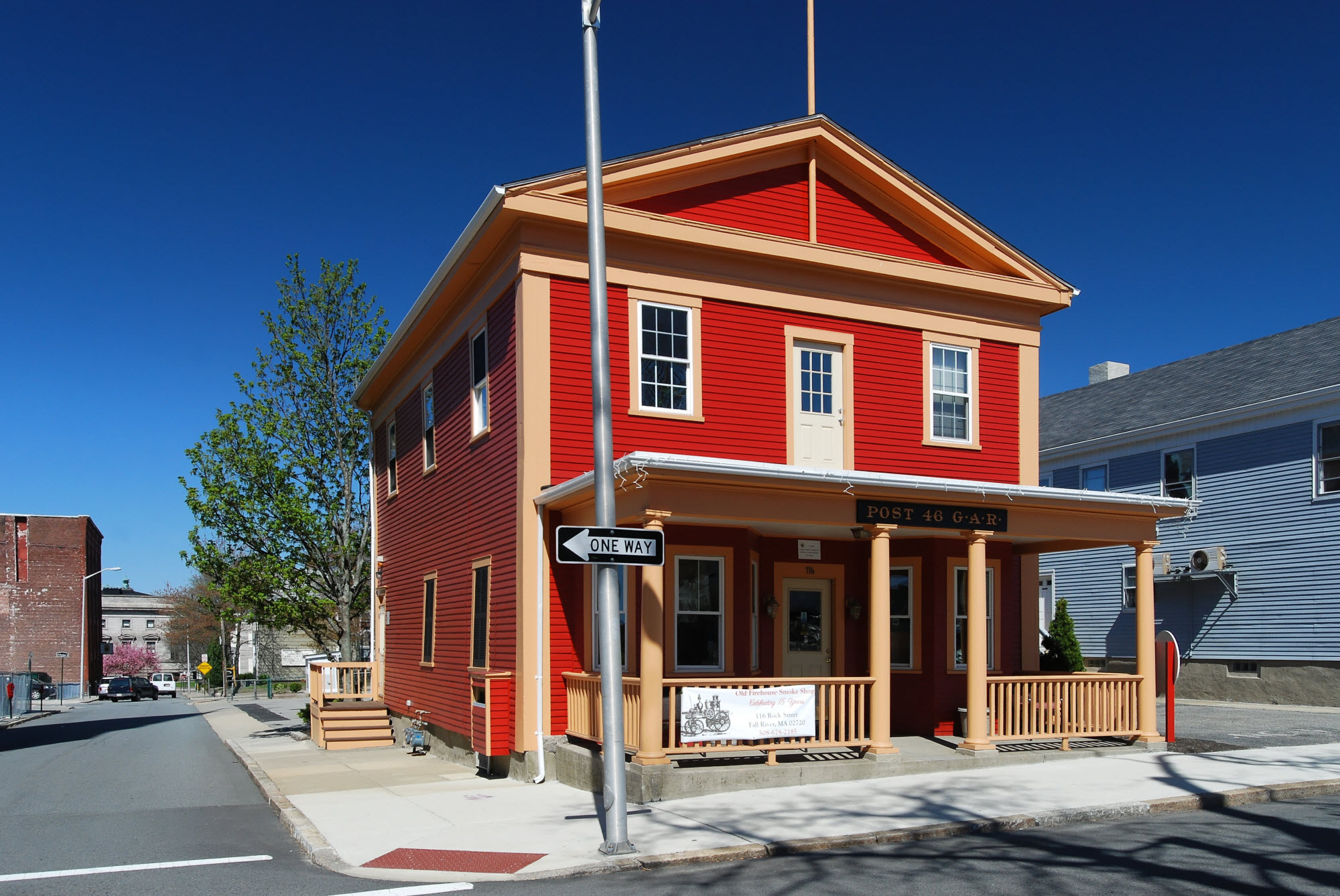
- 116 Rock Street

- Location within Massachusetts Location within the United States
- Location: Fall River, Massachusetts
- Coordinates: 41°42′12″N 71°9′14″W
- Built: 1843
- Architectural style: Greek Revival
- Part of: Lower Highlands Historic District (ID84002171)
- MPS: Fall River MRA
- NRHP reference No.: 83000645

Significant dates
- Added to NRHP: February 16, 1983
- Designated CP: January 10, 1984

Cataract Engine Company No. 3 is a historic building at 116 Rock Street in Fall River, Massachusetts. It also served as the meeting hall of the Richard Borden GAR Post No. 46 of the Grand Army of the Republic. It is now occupied by a tobacco shop.

The building is a two-story wood-frame structure, three bays wide, with a front-facing gable roof. A single-story porch spans the front, and plain pilasters grace the building corners. It was built in 1843 as the city's third fire station. It is the city's only surviving frame fire station, and one of its only surviving non-residential Greek Revival structures.

The building was listed on the National Register of Historic Places in 1983.

== See also ==
- Lower Highlands Historic District
- National Register of Historic Places listings in Fall River, Massachusetts
