= Lower Highlands Historic District =

Historic district in Massachusetts, United States

- U.S. National Register of Historic Places
- U.S. Historic district
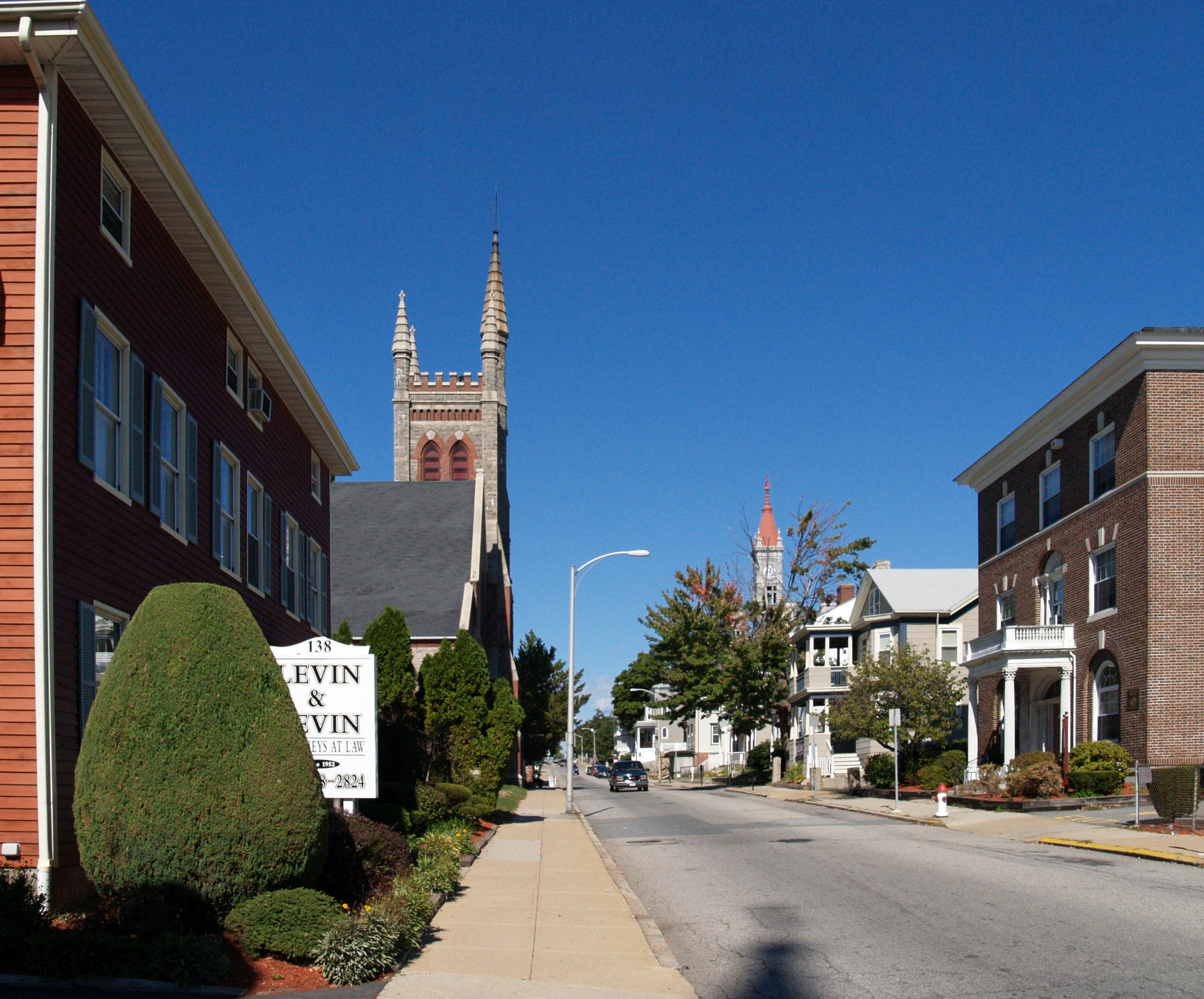
- Rock Street

- Location within Massachusetts Location within the United States
- Location: Roughly bounded by Cherry, Main, Winter, and Bank Sts., Fall River, Massachusetts
- Coordinates: 41°42′15″N 71°8′58″W
- Area: 212 acres (86 ha)
- Architectural style: Greek Revival, Late Victorian
- MPS: Fall River MRA
- NRHP reference No.: 84002171
- Added to NRHP: January 10, 1984

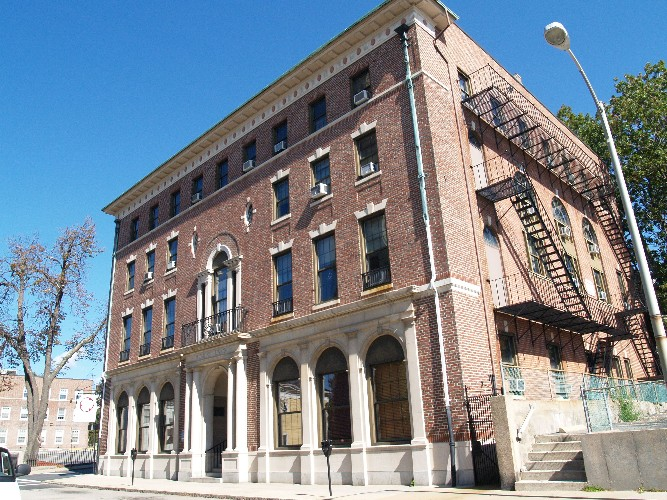
Women's Union Building (1909), Rock Street

The Lower Highlands Historic District encompasses one of the oldest residential areas of Fall River, Massachusetts. The district is roughly bounded by Cherry, Main, Winter, and Bank Streets, and is located just east of the Downtown Fall River Historic District and directly south of the Highlands Historic District. This area was settled by 1810, has architecture tracing the city's growth as a major industrial center. The historic district was added to the National Register of Historic Places in 1984.

== History ==
The area of Fall River's Lower Highlands has a settlement history dating to the area's prehistory, when the banks of the Quequechan River were settled by Wampanoag Native Americans. The city's major thoroughfare were laid out by English colonists in the 18th century. The Lower Highlands area was by the late 18th century the site of grist, saw, and fulling mills, with a small community of residences clustered nearby. The first of the city's large textile mills was built on the Quequechan River in 1813. North Main Street and Bedford Street became commercial areas, and the area to their northeast developed as a residential district. A substantial portion of the area was devastated by fire in 1843, but was soon rebuilt. Little development has taken place since the early 20th century, when the city's economy began a long decline.

== Description ==
The Lower Highlands district consists of about 212 acres (86 ha), roughly bounded by Cherry, Main, Winter, and Bank Streets. Most of its more than 100 buildings are residential in character, with the oldest dating to 1810. A modest number of houses survive that are Federal in style, and there are a significant number of houses with at least vernacular Greek Revival elements. Much of the construction in the second half of the 19th century was vernacular multiunit housing for workers, sometimes with modest vernacular stylistic elements popular at the time of construction. Prominent non-residential buildings include the 1875 Gothic Revival Church of the Ascension, and the Cataract Engine Company No. 3, built in 1843 after the great fire.

== Contributing properties (partial listing) ==
Residential

- Randall N. Durfee House (c.1896), 435 Cherry Street
- Elijah J. Kilburn House (c.1866), 239 High Street
- Coggeshall House (c.1845), 166 Purchase Street

Non-residential

- J.D. Hathaway Carpentry Shop (c.1845), 325 Pine Street
- Former Truesdale Clinic (1913), 160 Rock Street
- Gee Building (1910), 202-212 Rock Street
- Women's Union (1909), 101 Rock Street

== Properties with separate NRHP Listings ==
- Cataract Engine Company No. 3, 116 Rock Street
- Church of the Ascension, 160 Rock Street
- William C. Davol, Jr. House, 252 High Street
- James D. Hathaway House, 311 Pine Street

== See also ==
- National Register of Historic Places listings in Fall River, Massachusetts
- Highlands Historic District (Fall River, Massachusetts)
