= Central Fire Station (Taunton, Massachusetts) =

- U.S. National Register of Historic Places
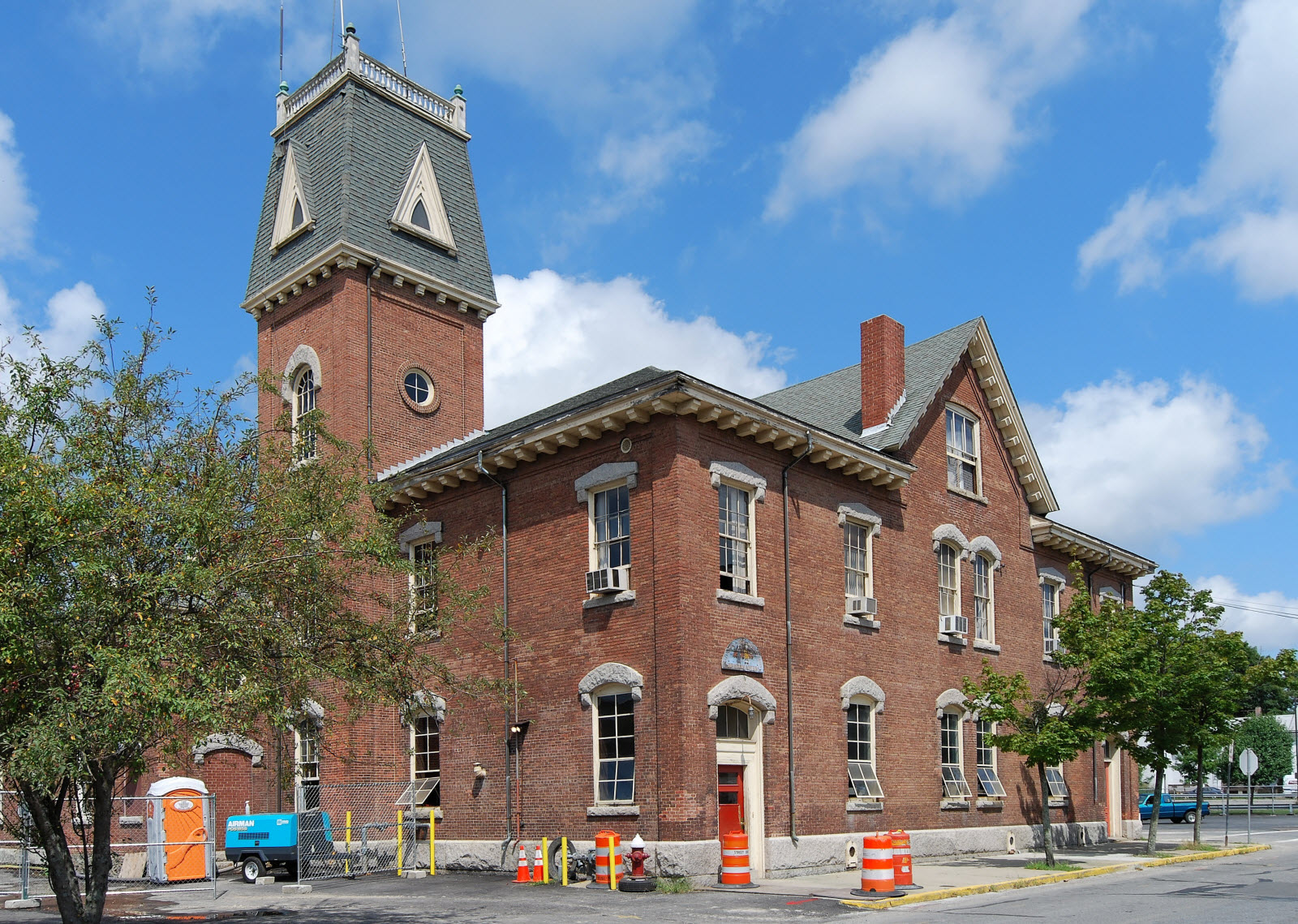

- Location within Massachusetts Location within the United States
- Location: Taunton, Massachusetts
- Coordinates: 41°54′14″N 71°5′32″W
- Built: 1869
- Architect: Swasey, A.E., Jr.; Sherman, Z.
- Architectural style: Italianate
- MPS: Taunton MRA
- NRHP reference No.: 84002101
- Added to NRHP: July 5, 1984

The Central Fire Station is an historic fire station at Leonard and School Streets in Taunton, Massachusetts. Built in 1869, it is the third oldest fire station still in use in the country, and the oldest in the city. It is the oldest *continuously operated* fire station in the country, never having closed for any period of time. It houses Taunton's Engine 1, Ladder 2, Ladder 3 and the Deputy Chief. It was listed on the National Register of Historic Places in 1984.

== Description and history ==
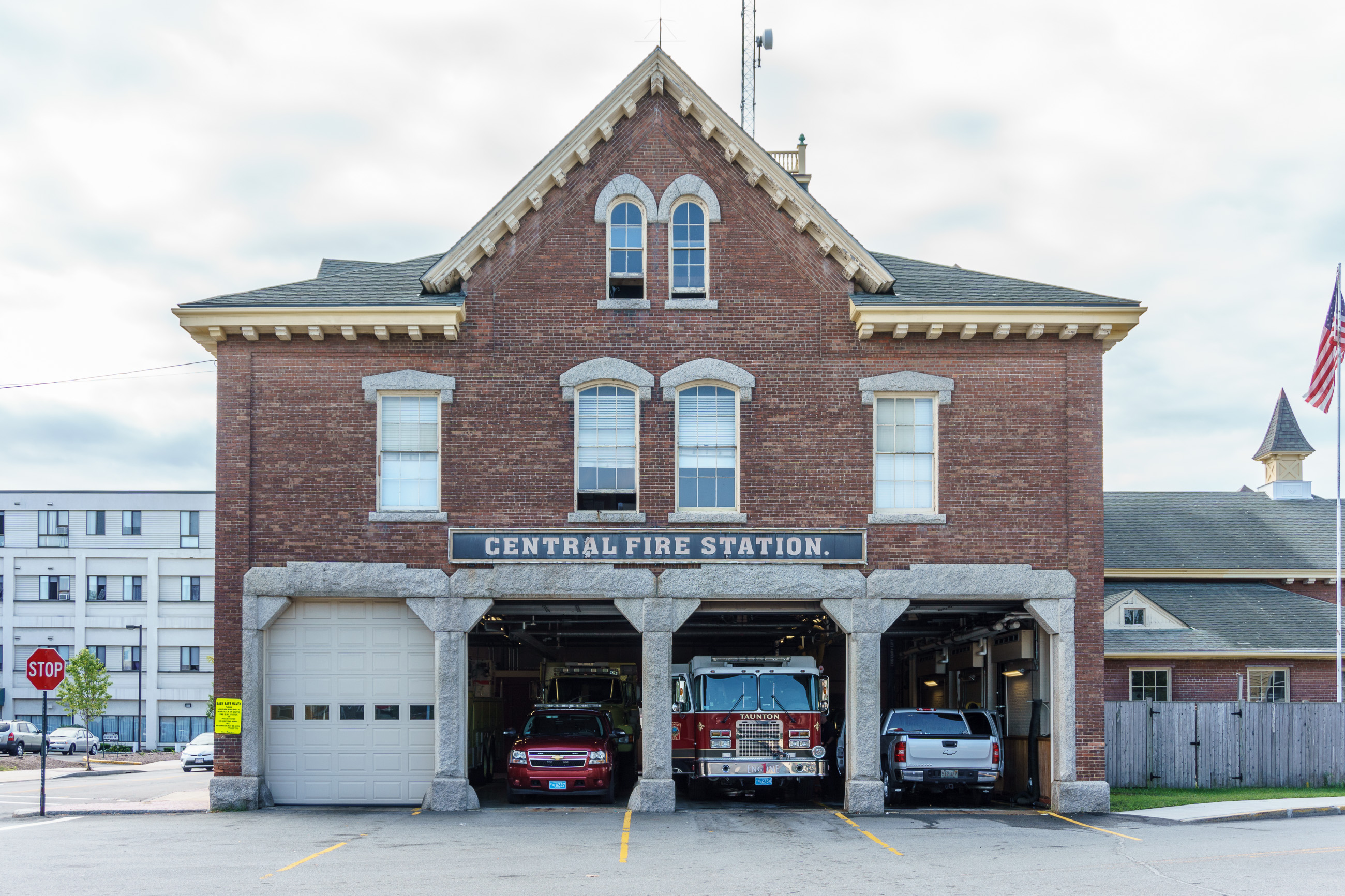
Front view

The Central Fire Station is located at the southwest corner of Leonard and School Streets in the city's central business district. It is a handsome brick 2-1/2 story structure, with a hip roof that has centered gables on its street-facing sides, and a mansard-roofed tower at the southwest corner. The main facade faces Leonard Street, and is dominated by four equipment bays, divided by granite piers and topped by granite lintels. Windows above are symmetrically arranged, with two segmented-arch windows in the center, and flat-arch windows flanking, with a pair of round-arch Italianate windows in the gable.

The station was designed by A.E. Swasey of Hartwell & Swasey of Boston, Massachusetts, and was built in 1869 by Abraham Briggs of Taunton. Swasey's successful designs in Taunton resulted in further firehouse commissions in Fall River.

In 2008, a $2.1 million overhaul of the Central Fire Station began. The project included a reconstructed basement and floor system designed to handle the weight of modern fire trucks. The station was also brought into compliance for access by disabled people.

== See also ==
- National Register of Historic Places listings in Taunton, Massachusetts
- Taunton Fire Department
