= Lincoln Park, Rhode Island =

Neighborhood in Rhode Island, United States

Coordinates: 41°44′15″N 71°26′02″W

Lincoln Park is a neighborhood in Warwick, Rhode Island. It was established early in the twentieth century.

Most of Lincoln Park's houses were built roughly between then and the mid-twentieth century. The old Lincoln Park School (1909, Angell & Swift) still stands in the center of the neighborhood, at 175 Massachusetts Avenue. It is now used as apartments. Lincoln Park is dominated by the Lincoln Park Cemetery, a Jewish cemetery established in 1906 by Chesed Shel Emes. The most architecturally significant building in the neighborhood is the small chapel in the cemetery.

Part of the neighborhood was demolished in the 1960s for an extension of I-95, which forms the neighborhood's northern boundary. North of it is Norwood. Most of the streets are named for the states. It is about 0.4 miles north of Airport Road, and 0.7 miles north of Hillsgrove. Post Road, the main route through Lincoln Park, is lines with businesses.
