= Church of the Ascension (Fall River, Massachusetts) =

Historic church in Massachusetts, United States

- U.S. National Register of Historic Places
- U.S. Historic district – Contributing property
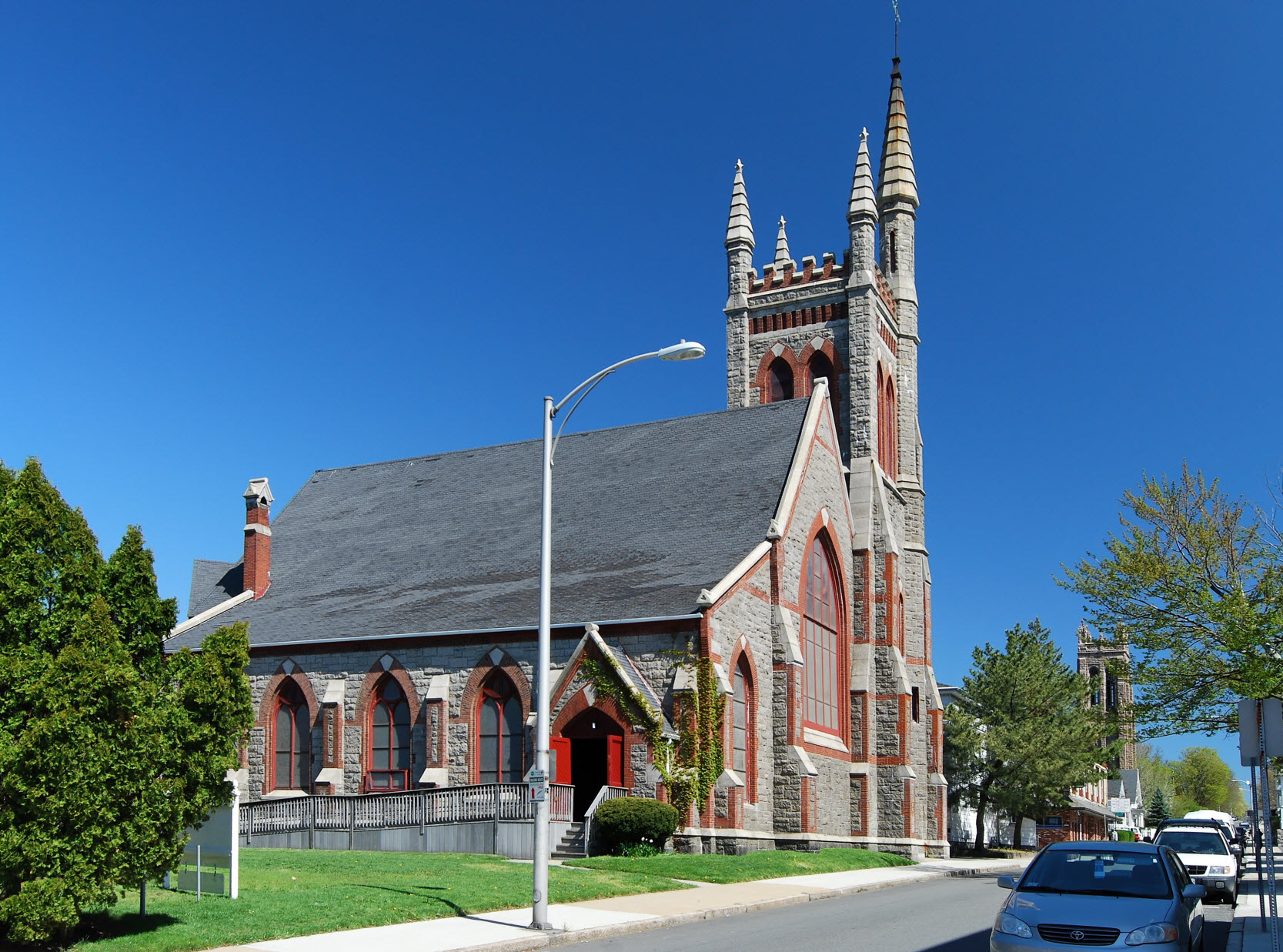

- Location within Massachusetts Location within the United States
- Location: Fall River, Massachusetts
- Coordinates: 41°42′4″N 71°9′12″W
- Built: 1875
- Architect: Covel & Baker, John J. Highland, Angell & Swift
- Part of: Lower Highlands Historic District (ID84002171)
- MPS: Fall River MRA
- NRHP reference No.: 83000653

Significant dates
- Added to NRHP: February 16, 1983
- Designated CP: January 10, 1984

The Church of the Ascension is a historic Episcopal church building located at 160 Rock Street in Fall River, Massachusetts. It was completed in 1875 and added to the National Register of Historic Places in 1983. It is also located within the Lower Highlands Historic District.

As of 2008, the parish is now known as the Church of the Holy Spirit.

== History ==
The Church of the Ascension Episcopal parish was formed in 1836, and was the first Episcopal parish in Fall River. Services were initially held at the Unitarian Church in 1835, and later at Pocasset Hall. The parish later used the old Town Hall on Central Street until 1840, when it purchased the old First Baptist Church on South Main Street, which burned in 1850 and rebuilt in 1852. However, by 1872, this building proved to be too small for the growing congregation, so services were held in the Music Hall from 1872 to 1875, as plans for a new church on Rock Street were made.

The current church building was dedicated on Nov. 29, 1875. It is constructed from Fall River granite with red brick and Scotch stone trim. The masonry work was done by Covel & Baker of Fall River for $39,250. The architect is not known.

In 1910, a Tudor Revival parish house was added next to the church. It was designed by Angell & Swift.

The church is built in the Victorian Gothic style with a buttressed square tower with a crenellated cap and stone corner pinnacles. The tight massing, is relieved by the addition of a side garden, attached chapel, and handsome brick and shingle parish house.

On April 6, 2008 the Church of the Ascension parish signed a joint covenant with St. John's / St. Stephen's Parish and St. Mark's Episcopal Parish. All three were then merged to become the new Church of the Holy Spirit.

== See also ==
- National Register of Historic Places listings in Fall River, Massachusetts
