= B.M.C. Durfee High School (1886 building) =

- U.S. National Register of Historic Places
- U.S. Historic district – Contributing property
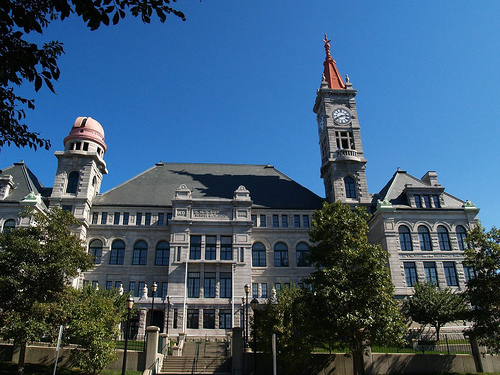

- Location within Massachusetts Location within the United States
- Location: Fall River, Massachusetts
- Coordinates: 41°42′20″N 71°9′8″W
- Built: 1886
- Architect: George A. Clough; Norcross Bros.
- Architectural style: Renaissance
- Part of: Highlands Historic District (ID83000677)
- NRHP reference No.: 81000109

Significant dates
- Added to NRHP: June 11, 1981
- Designated CP: February 16, 1983

B.M.C. Durfee High School is an historic former high school building at 289 Rock Street in Fall River, Massachusetts. The school was built in 1886 and added to the National Register of Historic Places in 1981. In 1978, it was replaced by the current B.M.C. Durfee High School building. The old building was restored in the early 1990s and is now operated as a probate and family courthouse by the Commonwealth of Massachusetts.

== Historical background ==
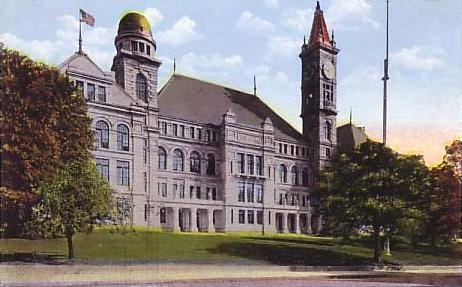
Durfee High School, 1920

The building was built as a donation from Mrs. Mary B. Young to the people of the city of Fall River, in memory of her son Bradford Matthew Chaloner Durfee, who had died at a young age in 1872, leaving a sizable inheritance.

George A. Clough, a Boston architect was chosen to design the building. Ground was broken in August 1883. The first story of the school is constructed of native Fall River Granite, while the stone of the upper portions is from Mason, New Hampshire. The new high school was formally dedicated to the city on June 15, 1887.

The building occupies a commanding position atop a hill in the city's Highlands neighborhood, and is visible from miles around. Even today, the school's sports teams are known as the "Durfee Hilltoppers".

== Recent history ==
In 1978, the city opened a new, much larger high school in the north end, also named "B.M.C. Durfee High School". The old high school remained vacant until the early 1990s when it was taken over by the Commonwealth of Massachusetts, for use as a Probate Court House. The restoration was completed in the mid-1990s. The Southeast branch of the Massachusetts Housing Court is located in the building as well.

== Telescope ==
The building features a rare 4-foot telescope with an 8-inch lens, built by the Warner & Swasey Company in 1887. The observatory sat idle for decades, until volunteers began work restoring the telescope and clock mechanism in 2009. The telescope opened for public viewing for select nights in 2015.

== See also ==
- National Register of Historic Places listings in Fall River, Massachusetts
- Highlands Historic District (Fall River, Massachusetts)
- B.M.C. Durfee High School (present)
