= Hebronville Mill Historic District =

Historic district in Massachusetts, United States

- U.S. National Register of Historic Places
- U.S. Historic district
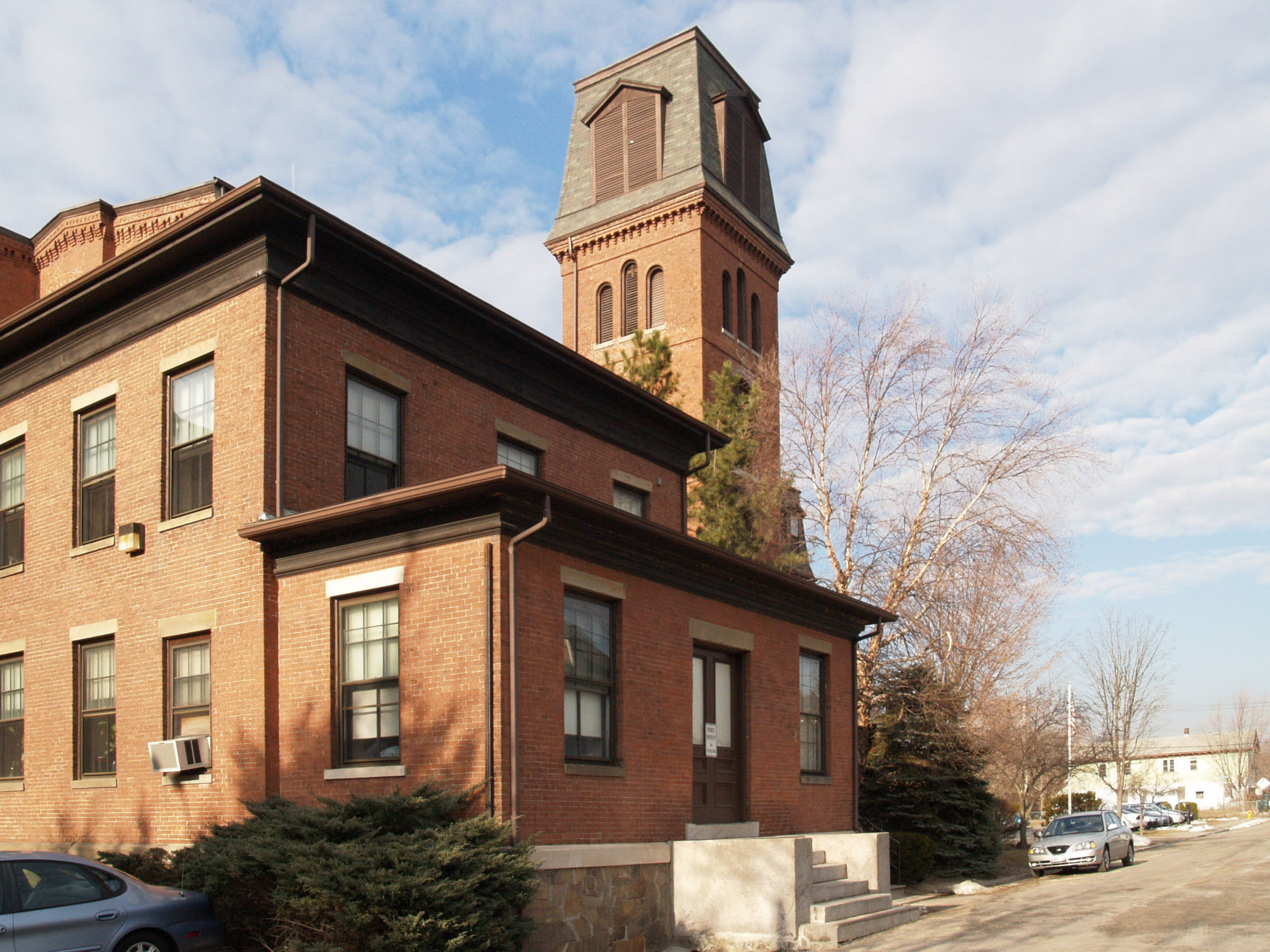
- Hebronville Mill

- Location within Massachusetts Location within the United States
- Location: Attleboro, Massachusetts
- Coordinates: 41°54′18″N 71°19′12″W
- Built: 1854
- Architectural style: Greek Revival, Italianate
- NRHP reference No.: 84002126
- Added to NRHP: May 17, 1984

Hebronville Mill Historic District is a historic district in Attleboro, Massachusetts. The mill complex includes manufacturing buildings and worker housing.

The Hebronville Mill Warehouse and Processing Company was owned and operated by John J. Ryan and Sons Cotton Brokers from the late 1920s through the Second World War until the early 1950s. During this time, the mill was managed by Edward "Ted" W. Corr of Taunton, Massachusetts. The main function of the mill was reprocessing of cotton waste material obtained from 20 other company mills located throughout Rhode Island and Massachusetts.

The district was added to the National Register of Historic Places in 1984.

== See also ==
- National Register of Historic Places listings in Bristol County, Massachusetts
