= Pocasset Firehouse No. 7 =

- U.S. National Register of Historic Places
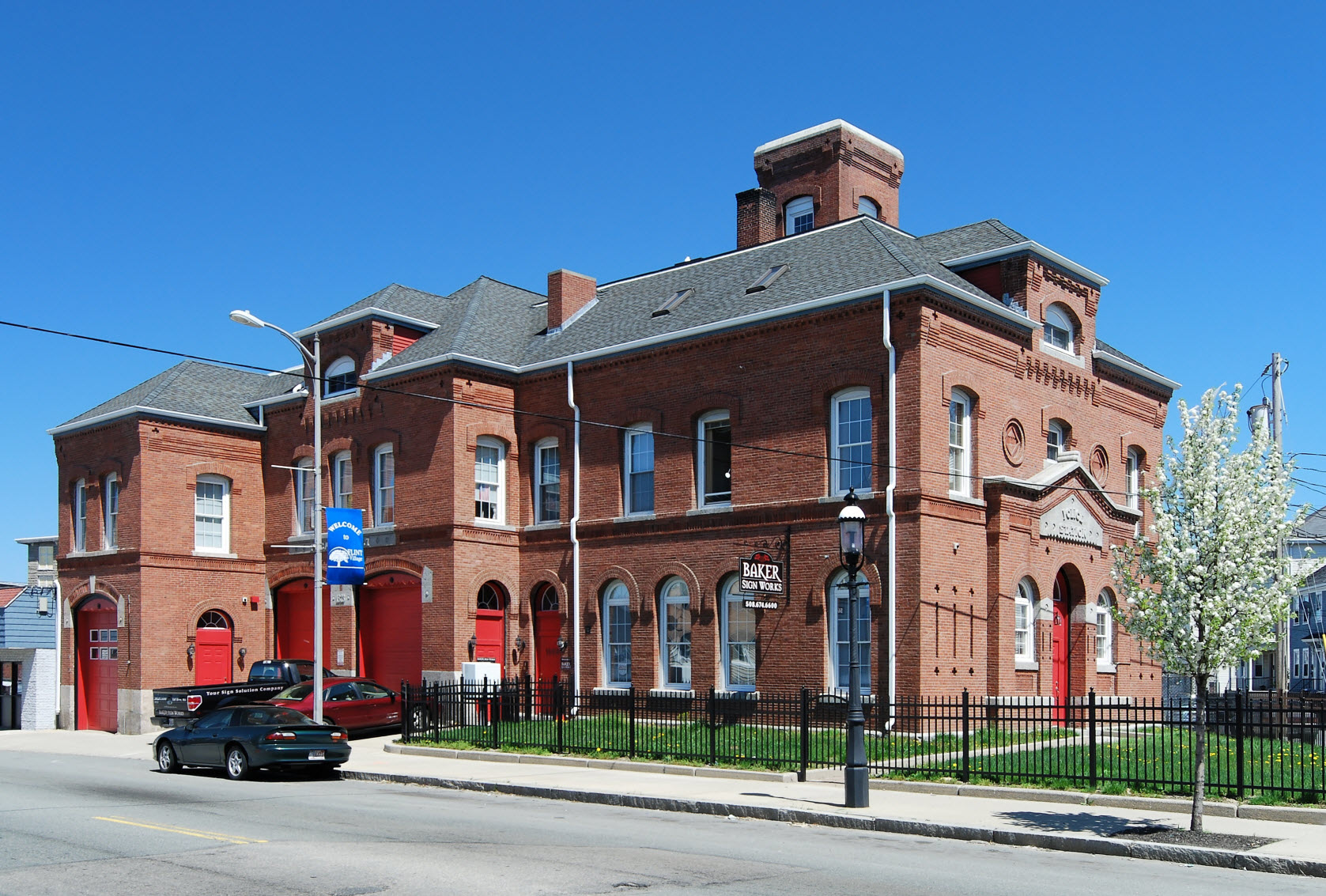

- Location within Massachusetts Location within the United States
- Location: 1058 Pleasant Street, Fall River, Massachusetts
- Coordinates: 41°41′40″N 71°8′19″W
- Built: 1873
- Architect: Hartwell & Swasey
- Architectural style: Gothic
- MPS: Fall River MRA
- NRHP reference No.: 83000706
- Added to NRHP: February 16, 1983

Pocasset Firehouse No. 7 is a historic former fire station in Fall River, Massachusetts. Built in 1873, it is one of four extant firehouses within the city designed by Boston architects Hartwell & Swasey in the Ruskinian Gothic style. The others include the Quequechan No. 1 on Prospect Street, the Massasoit No. 5 on Freedom Street, the Anawan No. 6 Firehouse on North Main Street.

In 1895, an extension was built on the west side of the main structure to accommodate of a hook and ladder truck. A portion of the building was used as a police station. The Pocasset Firehouse was built to serve the Flint Village section of the city. It operated as a fire station until 1988, when the Flint Reney/Eastwood Fire Station opened on Eastern Avenue.

The station was added to the National Register of Historic Places in 1983. It now privately owned, and occupied by Baker Sign Works.

== See also ==
- National Register of Historic Places listings in Fall River, Massachusetts
