= Highlands Historic District (Fall River, Massachusetts) =

Historic district in Massachusetts, United States

- U.S. National Register of Historic Places
- U.S. Historic district
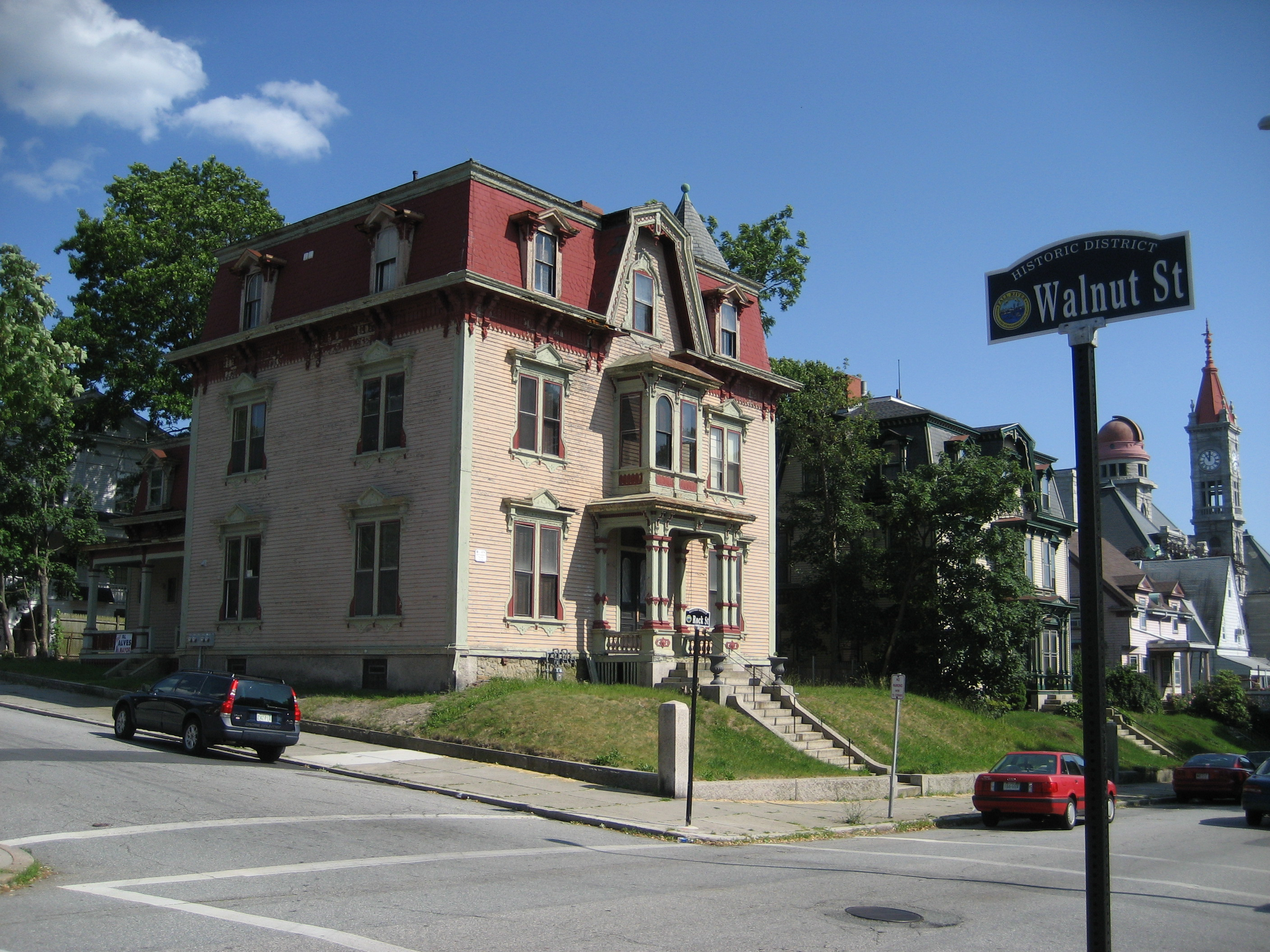
- Corner of Walnut & Rock Street

- Location within Massachusetts Location within the United States
- Location: Fall River, Massachusetts
- Coordinates: 41°42′37″N 71°9′0″W
- Built: 1840
- Architectural style: Late 19th And 20th Century Revivals, Greek Revival, Late Victorian
- MPS: Fall River MRA
- NRHP reference No.: 83000677
- Added to NRHP: February 16, 1983

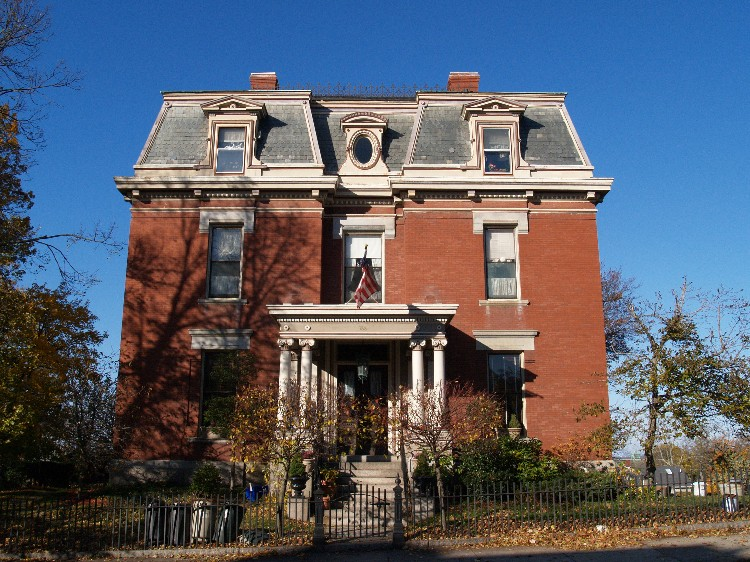
Edmund Chase House (c.1874)

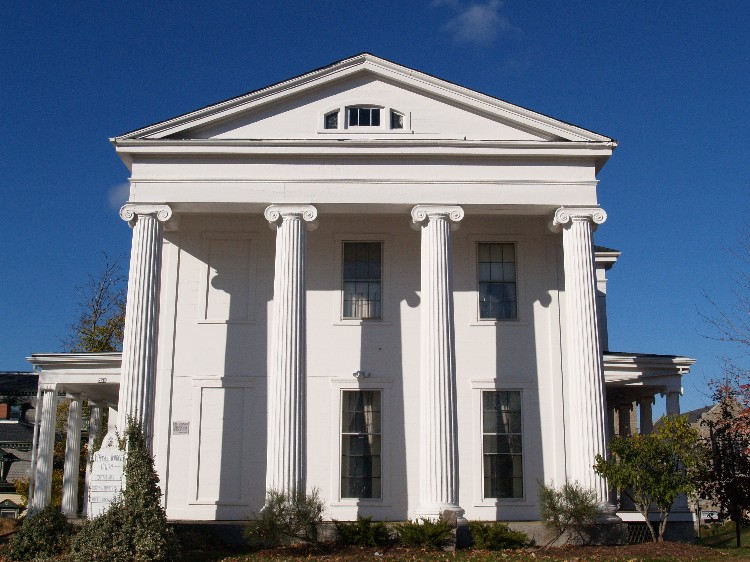
Jefferson Borden House (c.1840)

The Highlands Historic District is a historic district roughly bounded by June, Cherry, and Weetamoe Streets, Lincoln, Highland, President, North Main, and Hood Avenues in Fall River, Massachusetts. The district lies just north of the Lower Highlands Historic District.

The Highlands Historic District was added to the National Register of Historic Places in 1983. It encompasses over 1,400 acres (5.7 km^{2}) and contains over 300 structures.

== History ==
The area known today as the "highlands" in Fall River was originally known as the Rodman Farm. The area is located along a high ridge with views of the Taunton River and Mount Hope Bay. After the original downtown area of the city suffered a devastating fire in 1843, the wealthy mill owners and their families gradually sought to distance themselves from the central business district.

The Highlands Historic District contains a wide variety of mostly residential homes largely built between 1840 and 1925. Just one home, the Church-Tory house (c.1750) at 96 French Street predates the major development of the area.

The district also includes North Park, designed by the Olmsted Brothers in the mid-1880s.

== Contributing properties (partial listing) ==
Residential

- Charles Shove House (c.1850) 715 High Street, Italianate
- Church-Tory House (c.1750), 96 French Street, Colonial
- Jefferson Borden House (c.1840), 386 High Street, Greek Revival
- Remington-Borden House (c.1858), 511 Rock Street, Carpenter Gothic
- Edmund Chase House (c.1874), 388 Rock Street, Second Empire
- Philip Borden House (c.1884), 669 Rock Street, Queen Anne
- Simeon Borden House (1876), 484 Highland Street, Ruskinian Gothic
- Charles Buffington House (1882), 216 Prospect Street, Queen Anne
- Maplecroft (Allen-Borden House) (1889), 306 French Street, Queen Anne
- Michael T. Hudner House (1900), 674 Highland Avenue

Educational/public

- Westall School (1907), 276 Maple Street
- Fall River Technical School (1929), 290 Rock Street
- Quequechan Firehouse (1873), 330 Prospect Street
- Anawan No. 6 Firehouse (1873), North Main Street

Religious

- First Congregational Church (1913), 282 Rock Street
- United Presbyterian Church (1924), 414 Rock Street
- Temple Beth-El (1928), 385 High Street

== Properties with separate NRHP listings ==
- B.M.C Durfee High School (1886), 289 Rock Street, added in 1981
- Osborn House (1843), 456 Rock Street, added in 1980

== See also ==
- Lower Highlands Historic District
- National Register of Historic Places listings in Fall River, Massachusetts
- History of Fall River, Massachusetts
