= Fall River Waterworks =

- U.S. National Register of Historic Places
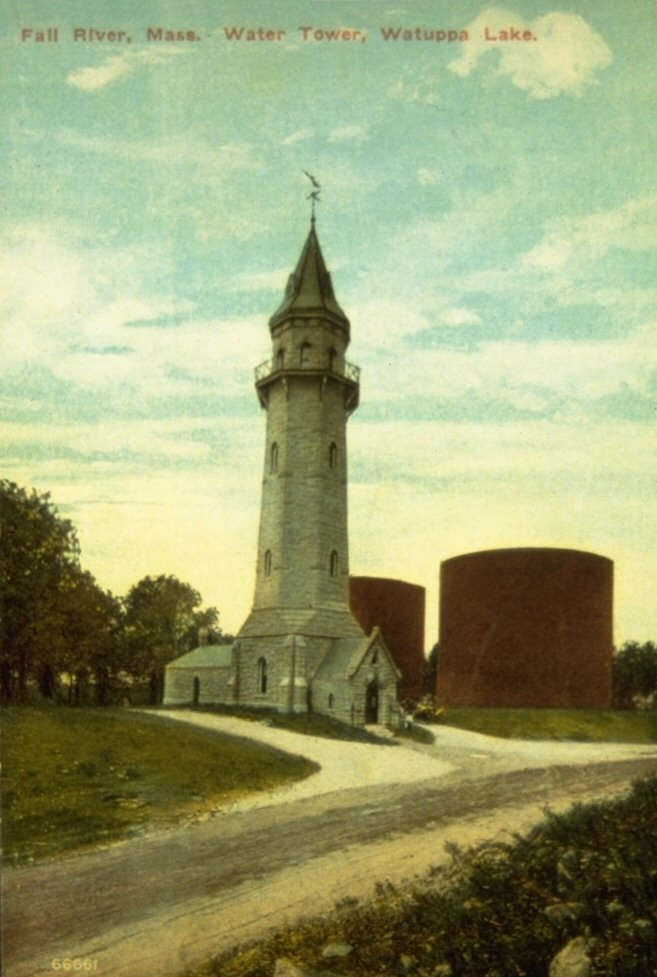
- Postcard of the 1873 standpipe water tower

- Location within Massachusetts Location within the United States
- Location: Fall River, Massachusetts
- Coordinates: 41°42′7″N 71°7′9″W
- Built: 1873
- Architect: H.M. Wilson
- NRHP reference No.: 81000714
- Added to NRHP: December 7, 1981

Fall River Waterworks is a 22-acre (8.9 ha) historic site located at the eastern end of Bedford Street in Fall River, Massachusetts, along the shore of North Watuppa Pond. The property, which is still used as a water works for the city, contains the original pumping station, intake house and 121-foot (37 m) tall standpipe water tower. The system was originally built between 1872 and 1875, and expanded or upgraded many times. It was added to the National Register of Historic Places in 1981.

The property also contains several non-contributing modern structures, that are still in use as part of the water works, including the 1976 filtration plant, the 1922 administration building, maintenance buildings and two large mid-20th century steel water tanks. The water supply system provides an average of 11 million gallons per day to Fall River and several surrounding communities.

== History ==
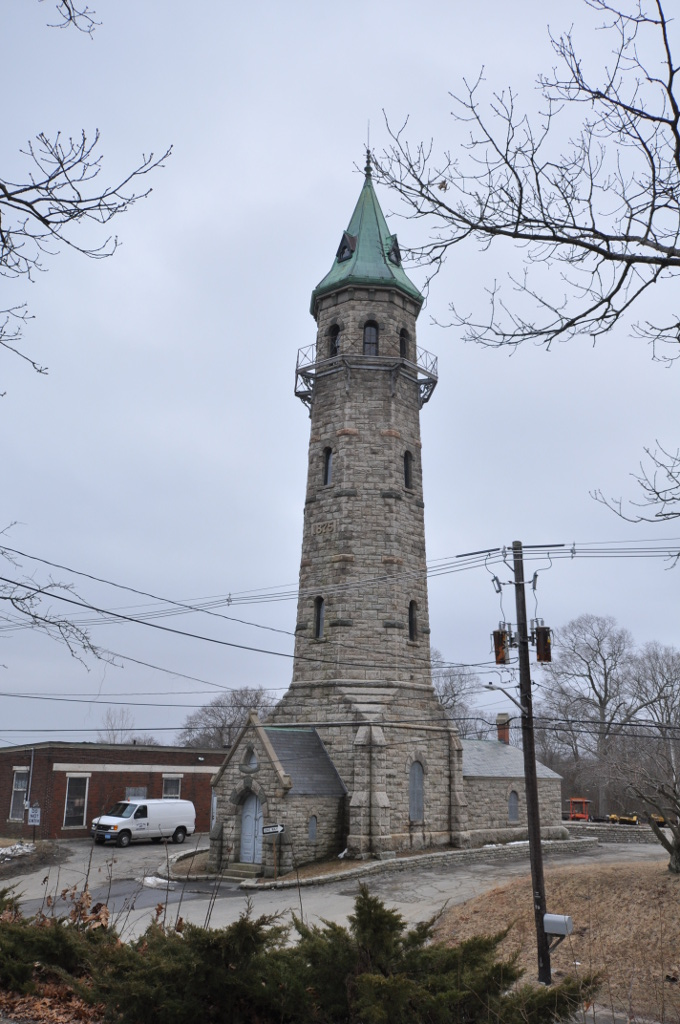
The water tower in 2019

Between 1870 and 1875, the City of Fall River experienced remarkable population growth. To keep up with demand for water for drinking and fire protection purposes, the Fall River Board of Water Commissioners was established in 1871. The buildings for the waterworks were constructed between 1872 and 1875 along the shore of North Watuppa Pond, a large naturally occurring water body at the east end of the city. The original buildings were constructed from local Fall River granite, mostly in the Ruskinian Gothic style. The engine house was designed to contain four engines, two for the high-service system and two for the low-service system. Initially, the system only contained two engines, one for each system. The first engine went into service in January 1874. It was a double horizontal condensing engine, built by the Boston Machine Company, and rated at 3 million gallons per day. It served the low-service system, which consisted of a 24-inch force main down Bedford Street to downtown. The high-service system consisted of a 16-inch force main down Bedford Street to Robeson, where it split to the higher elevations on each side of the Quequechan River. The high-service system went into service in 1875, and was supplied by a Worthington duplex pumping engine powering a pump rated at 5 million gallons per day. The pump house was also fitted with gates so that each pump could power either the high or low systems, if needed. By 1876, more than 45 miles of water pipe, ranging from 6 to 24 inches in diameter had been installed throughout the city.

The National Register designation includes the original pumping station that consists of the engine house, boiler house and coal house, the intake building, the standpipe water tower, as well as the 1908 Narrows gate house located at the southern end of North Watuppa Pond, adjacent to Interstate 195.

== See also ==
- National Register of Historic Places listings in Fall River, Massachusetts
