= Pilgrim Mills =

- U.S. National Register of Historic Places
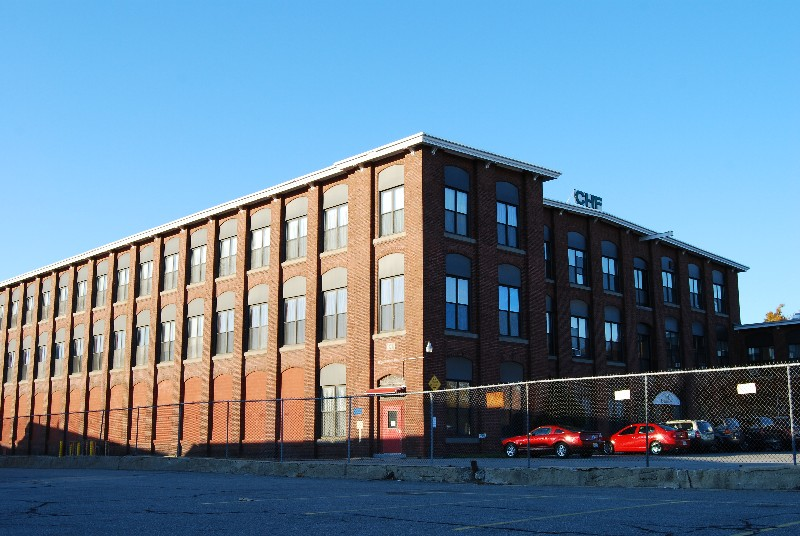

- Location within Massachusetts Location within the United States
- Location: 847 Pleasant St., Fall River, Massachusetts
- Coordinates: 41°41′56″N 71°9′5″W
- Area: 7.2 acres (2.9 ha)
- Built: 1911
- Built by: Beattie & Cornell
- Architect: Charles W. Praray
- MPS: Fall River MRA
- NRHP reference No.: 83000704
- Added to NRHP: February 16, 1983

Pilgrim Mills is an historic textile mill located at 847 Pleasant Street in Fall River, Massachusetts. The mill was built in 1911 from red brick and was the first mill in the city powered entirely by electricity, provided from the local grid. It was one of the last mill complexes built in the city. The property was listed on the National Register of Historic Places in 1983.

== Description and history ==
The Pilgrim Mills complex is located east of downtown Fall River, on the north bank of the Quequechan River, south of Pleasant Street near 18th Street, and separated from Quarry Street by a strip of commercial development. The main buildings of the mill, its spinning and weaving houses, are three stories in height and built out of brick. A boiler house and chimney are attached to the west side, and a picker house is attached to the main mill at its northwest corner. A three-story brick storehouse stands angled to be parallel to Pleasant Street near the north end of the main mill.

The structure was designed by Charles W. Praray, a mill architect and engineer from New Bedford. Praray was the son of Charles A. M. Praray, a prominent mill designer from Providence who had practiced with Charles R. Makepeace, who had died in 1910. The contractors were Beattie & Cornell of Fall River. At its peak of production, it had a capacity of 53,568 spindles.

In 1945 the factory was acquired by Louis Hand, Inc., which manufactured curtains. It was later known as Aberdeen Manufacturing and most recently as CHF Industries. The plant closed in March 2008. In May 2011 there was a plan to demolish the mill for residences, but it was rejected. The mill was occupied by a book warehouse https://www.heraldnews.com/news/20170302/dollar-book-outlet-closing-shop-on-saturday-march-11 that closed in 2017.

== See also ==
- National Register of Historic Places listings in Fall River, Massachusetts
- List of mills in Fall River, Massachusetts
