= Fall River Bleachery =

- U.S. National Register of Historic Places
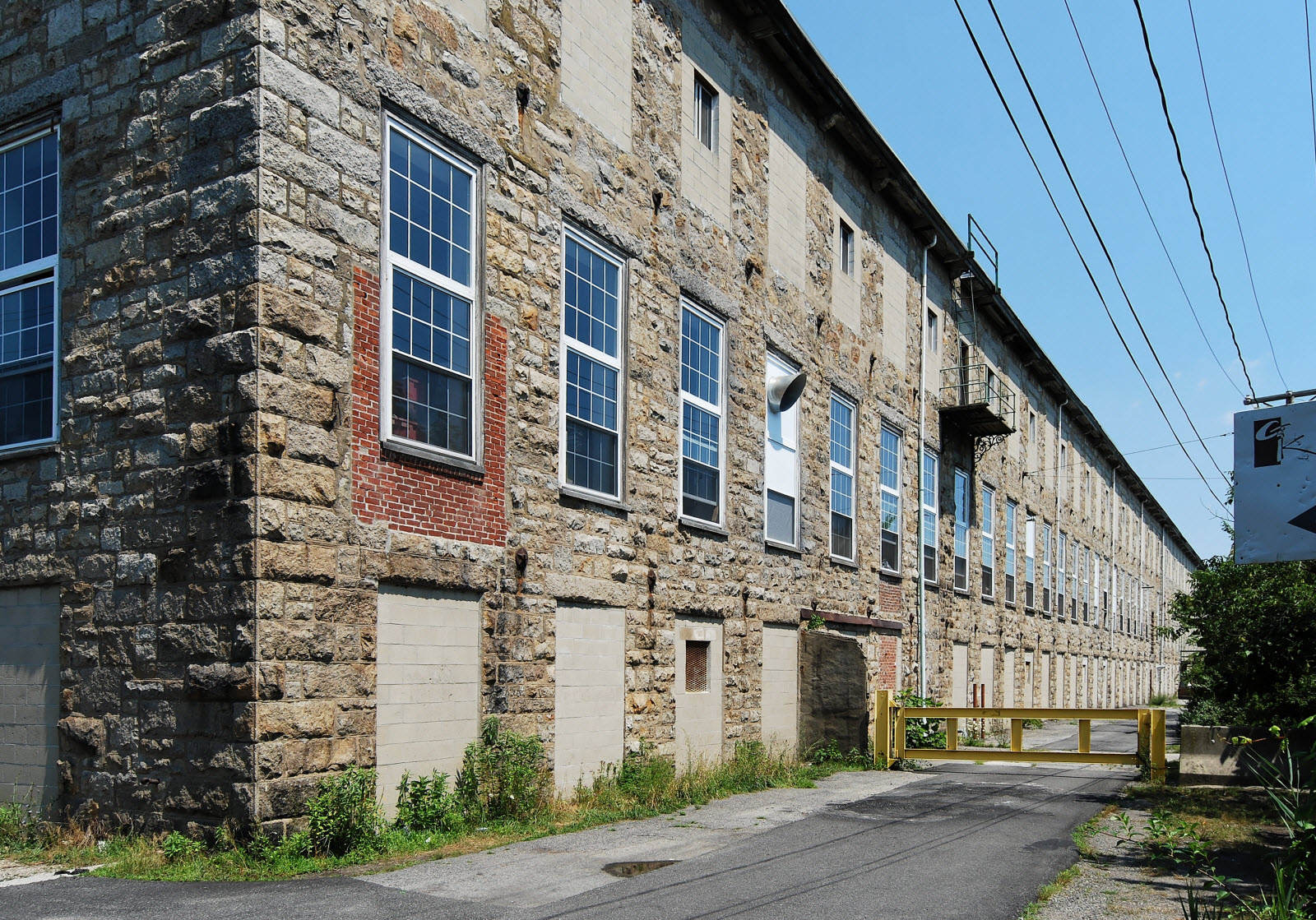

- Location within Massachusetts Location within the United States
- Location: Fall River, Massachusetts
- Coordinates: 41°40′19″N 71°8′44″W
- Built: 1872
- Architect: Paine, Walter J.; Multiple
- MPS: Fall River MRA
- NRHP reference No.: 83000667
- Added to NRHP: February 16, 1983

Fall River Bleachery is an historic textile bleachery on Jefferson Street in Fall River, Massachusetts.

The bleachery was built in 1872 and added to the National Register of Historic Places in 1983.

== Historical background ==
The primary product of most of the mills in Fall River was cotton print cloth. Much of it was printed at the American Print Works, which was one of the largest such companies in the United States. The best printing results are obtained from pure white cloth. During the period between 1870 and 1872, the city of Fall River grew rapidly, adding dozens of new mills during this time.

By 1872, Spencer Borden, the son of Jefferson Borden, had become trained chemist and had travelled to Europe to study the process of bleaching and dyeing textiles. On his return trip to the United States, he gathered a group of mill owners, including ones in New Bedford and Rhode Island to discuss the idea of establishing a large-scale bleachery in the area. A committee was formed to locate a suitable site. They tested the quality of the water supply in several areas in Fall River, Somerset, Tiverton, and as far north as Bridgewater. It was finally decided to locate the new bleachery at the mouth of Sucker Brook, where it flowed into South Watuppa Pond, in the southeast corner of the city of Fall River. The Sucker Brook is fed by Stafford Pond, a spring-fed water body in nearby Tiverton, Rhode Island. Its water was exceptionally pure with a high flow rate.

The bleachery mills were soon constructed from native Fall River granite found on the site. The factory was designed so that the water from the brook could flow through the facility without the need for pumping. Jefferson Borden was chosen as the first president of the company, which had a capacity to process up to thirteen tons of cotton annually.

The site would later be expanded over the years to keep up with demand from the many area mills. By about 1906, the bleachery had a capacity of 50 tons per day. In 1938 business conditions deteriorated and the company fell into the hands of creditors who decided to close the bleachery and liquidate the company. The machinery and equipment of the Fall River Bleachery was sold at auction on October 13, 1938.

A portion of the complex was destroyed by fire on October 30, 1967.

It is currently the headquarters for Spectrum Lighting, Inc., an architectural lighting manufacturer.

== See also ==
- National Register of Historic Places listings in Fall River, Massachusetts
- List of mills in Fall River, Massachusetts
