= American Printing Co. and Metacomet Mill =

- U.S. National Register of Historic Places
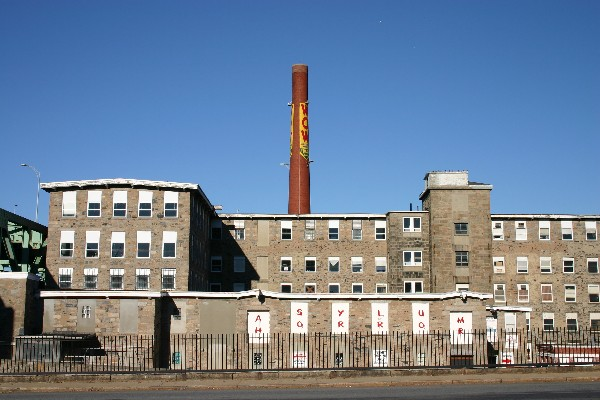
- Metacomet Mill, built 1847

- Location within Massachusetts Location within the United States
- Location: Anawan St., Fall River, Massachusetts
- Coordinates: 41°42′10″N 71°9′42″W
- Area: 8.6 acres (3.5 ha)
- Built: 1847
- Architect: Durfee, Bradford
- Architectural style: various
- MPS: Fall River MRA
- NRHP reference No.: 83000617
- Added to NRHP: February 16, 1983

The Metacomet Mill, built in 1847 by Colonel Richard Borden for the manufacture of cotton textiles, is the oldest remaining textile mill in Fall River, Massachusetts.

The adjacent American Printing Company Mill No. 7 (also known as Fall River Iron Works Mill No.7) was constructed in 1906 for the production of cotton print cloth.

Both structures were added to the National Register of Historic Places in 1983, and today contain a variety of small businesses.

The site was also photographed and surveyed by Jack E. Boucher in 1968, as part of the Historic American Buildings Survey.

== Historical background ==
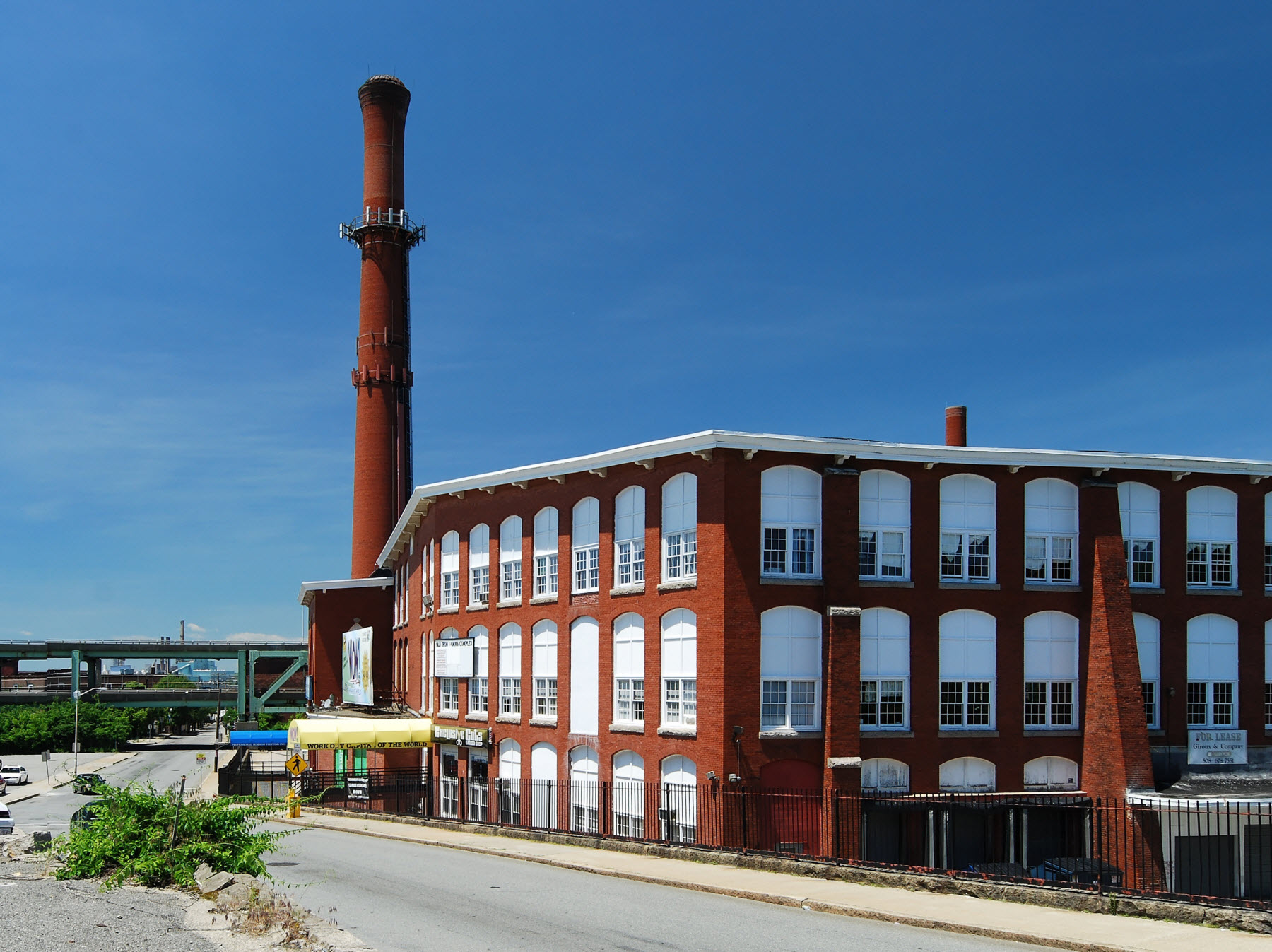
American Printing Company Mill No. 7, built 1906

The Metacomet Mill was originally constructed in 1847 by Colonel Richard Borden, a prominent local industrialist who had begun the Fall River Iron Works in 1821. The plans for the mill were brought from Bolton, England by Major Durfee and William Davol, and it was considered a "model mill" for its time. The mill was constructed of native field stones over the stream of the falling Quequechan River, which powered the machinery of the early mill. It originally had a gable roof and was five and one-half stories tall. The Metacomet Mill is also significant in that it was the first recorded use of cast iron girders and beams for mill construction in the United States. The cast iron beams and girders were an improvement on timber supports, which tended to become soft over time, resulting in a slight sagging in the floors, and upsetting the operation of machinery.

The Metacomet Mill was substantially enlarged later in the 19th century, and a steam engine was added to supplement the power of the falls. It later became known as "Iron Works" Mill No.6.

The American Printing Company Mill No.7, constructed of red brick in 1906, just upstream from the Metacomet Mill, on the site of the former Anawan Mill, also originally built by Colonel Richard Borden in 1825. Mill No. 7 was the last expansion of the American Printing Company, once the largest employer in Fall River during the height of its cotton textile industry. It is also known as "Iron Works" Mill No.7, as this was the name of the cloth-producing division of the same company; a tribute to the company's roots in 1821. Mill No.7 featured a Gothic-style engine house, which can still be seen today, along Anawan Street.

== The site today ==
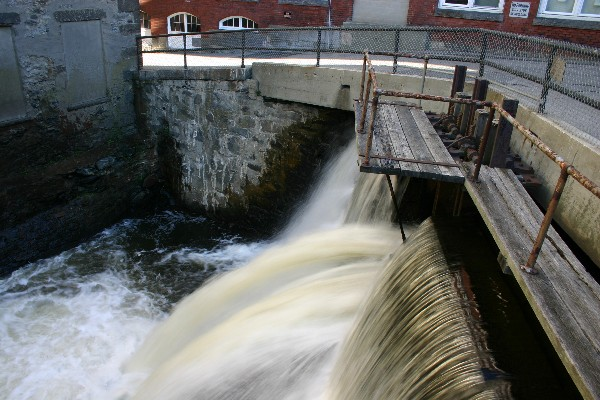
Quequechan River falls near the Metacomet Mill, Fall River, Massachusetts

Metacomet Mill and American Printing Company Mill Number 7 are the only two mills existing over the falls of the Quequechan River, which once had several mills in the steep stretch between downtown and the waterfront.

During the 1960s the mill complex was completely surrounded by the construction of Interstate 195 and the approach ramps to the Braga Bridge. Today, it is still possible to view the falls of the Quequechan River, for which the City of Fall River was named. Two small dams, on either side of the Number 7 mill "daylight" into small pools before flowing under the mills. The rest of the river was diverted into underground channels in the 1960s with the highway construction.

The Quequechan River "daylights" at the far end of the parking lot for the Metacomet Mill, beneath the Braga Bridge, adjacent to the railroad tracks.

The two historic mills currently contain a variety of small businesses, including the W.O.W. fitness center, and others. One of the site's two historic brick smokestacks contains a sign advertising the fitness center, while the other contains mobile telephone transmission equipment. Due to highway construction, the site remains a rather isolated pocket between downtown and the waterfront.

== See also ==
- American Printing Company
- Fall River Manufactory
- History of Fall River, Massachusetts
- Quequechan River
- List of mills in Fall River, Massachusetts
- National Register of Historic Places listings in Fall River, Massachusetts
