= Chace Mills =

Historic textile mill in Massachusetts, US

- U.S. National Register of Historic Places
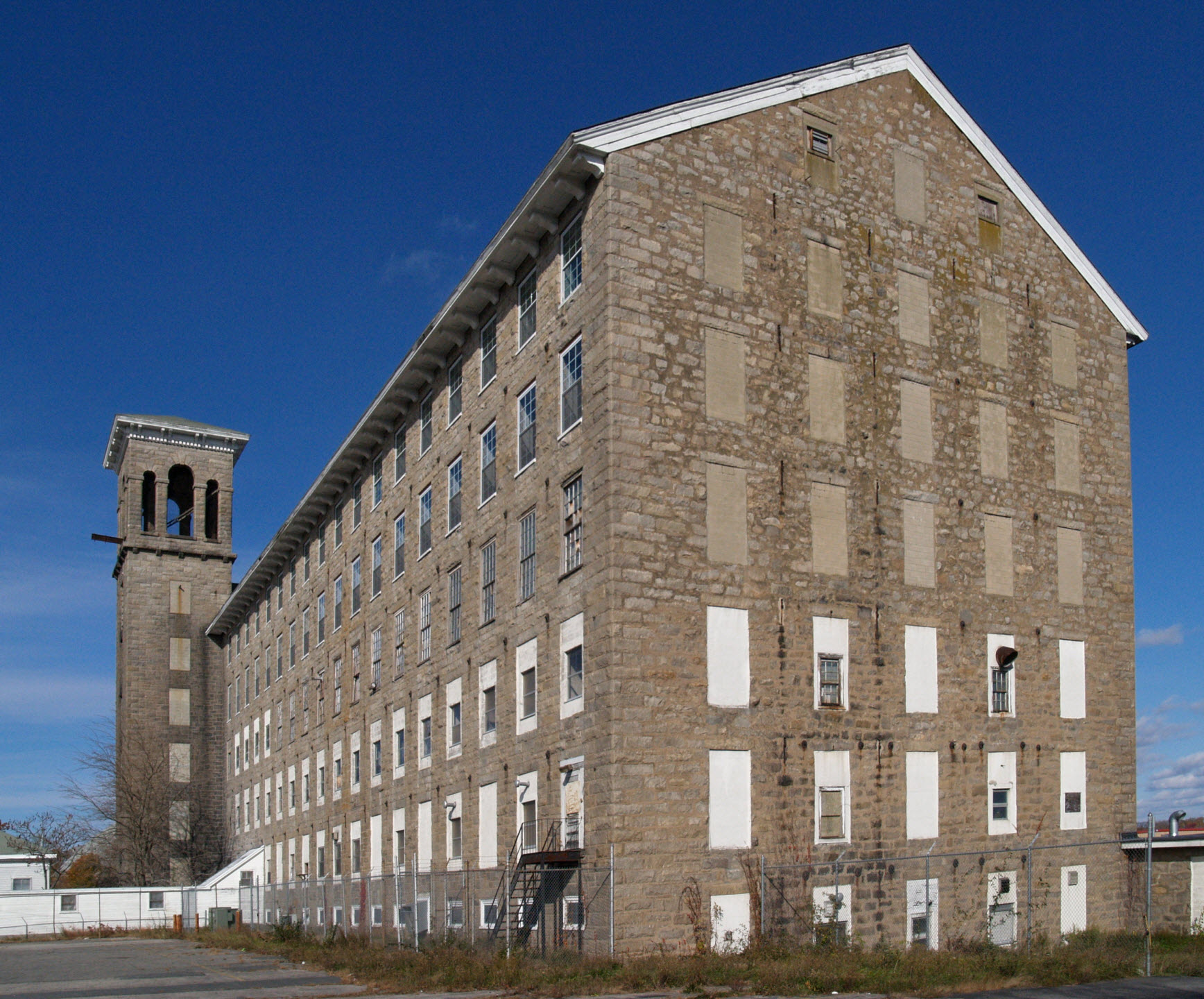

- Location within Massachusetts Location within the United States
- Location: Lewiston and Salem Sts., Fall River, Massachusetts
- Coordinates: 41°41′30″N 71°8′47″W
- Built: 1872
- Architectural style: Italianate
- MPS: Fall River MRA
- NRHP reference No.: 83000648
- Added to NRHP: February 16, 1983

Chace Mills is a historic textile mill complex on Lewiston and Salem Streets in Fall River, Massachusetts. Built in 1872, it is one of the city's most visible historic mills, with a particularly fine Italianate stair tower. The complex was added to the National Register of Historic Places in 1983.

== Description and history ==
Chace Mills is set on the south side of the Quequechan River, on the northeast side of Lewiston Street at its junction with Salem Street. The 5-1/2 story stone building is prominently visible from Interstate 195. It is built out of local granite and measures 377 by 74 feet (115 m × 23 m). Its most prominent and distinctive feature is the central stair tower, which rises to an open belfry with rounded-arch openings in Palladian arrangement. The tower is topped by a low-pitch hip roof with broad eaves decorated with paired brackets and dentil moulding.

The mill was organized in 1872 and built for the manufacture of cotton cloth with a capacity of 43,480 spindles. Augustus Chace served as the company's first president. In 1895, a two-story granite addition measuring 310 feet by 120 feet was built for weaving. The company also had a large one-story cotton storage building to the south of Mill No. 2, along the shoreline. The complex also includes two small wooden office buildings in front of the main mill. The mill was taken over by Arkwright in 1929. In 1999 a fire destroyed the adjacent weave shed and cotton storage buildings, but the main mill was saved, thanks in large part to a favorable winds.

== See also ==
- National Register of Historic Places listings in Fall River, Massachusetts
- List of mills in Fall River, Massachusetts
