= Watuppa Ponds =

Bodies of water in Massachusetts, US

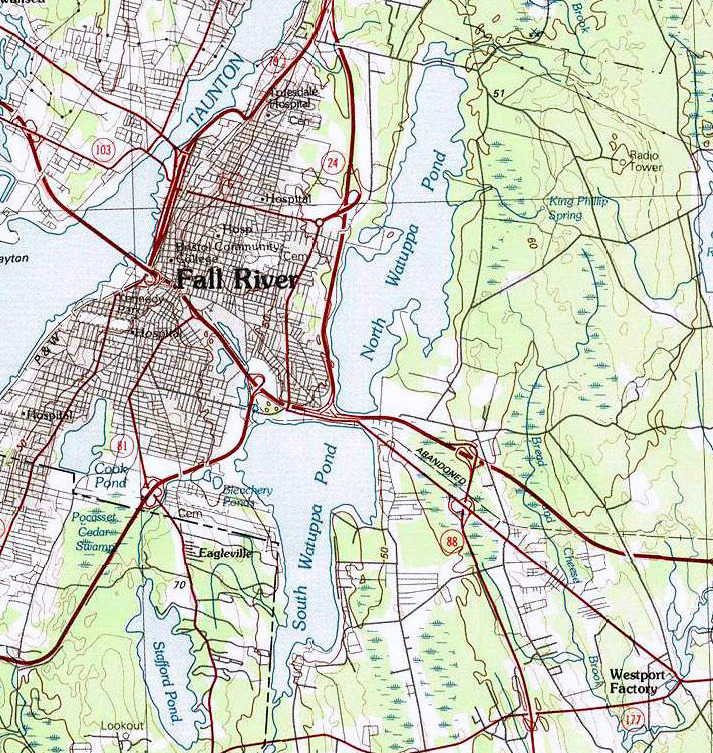
- USGS map of Watuppa Ponds

- Location within Massachusetts Location within the United States
- Location: Fall River and Westport, Massachusetts
- Coordinates: 41°41′00″N 71°07′00″W
- Type: natural
- Primary inflows: Spring-fed, also Sucker Brook, Stony Brook, King Philip Brook, Queen Gutter Brook
- Primary outflows: Quequechan River
- Basin countries: United States
- Max. length: 7.5 mi (12.1 km) (both ponds)
- Max. width: 1.0 mi (1.6 km) (average)
- Surface area: North 1,805 acres (730 ha); South 1,551 acres (628 ha)
- Average depth: 15 ft (4.6 m) (South Watuppa)
- Max. depth: 22 ft (6.7 m) (South Watuppa); 25 ft (7.6 m) (North Watuppa)
- Surface elevation: 131 ft (40 m)
- Sections/sub-basins: South Wattupa Pond, North Wattupa Pond

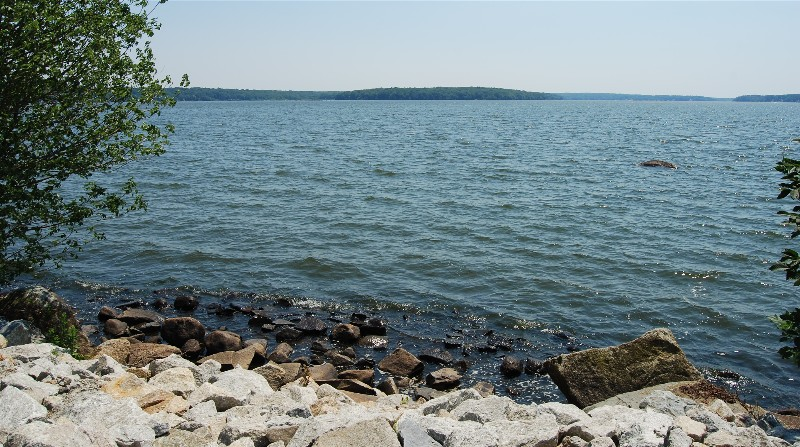
South Watuppa Pond

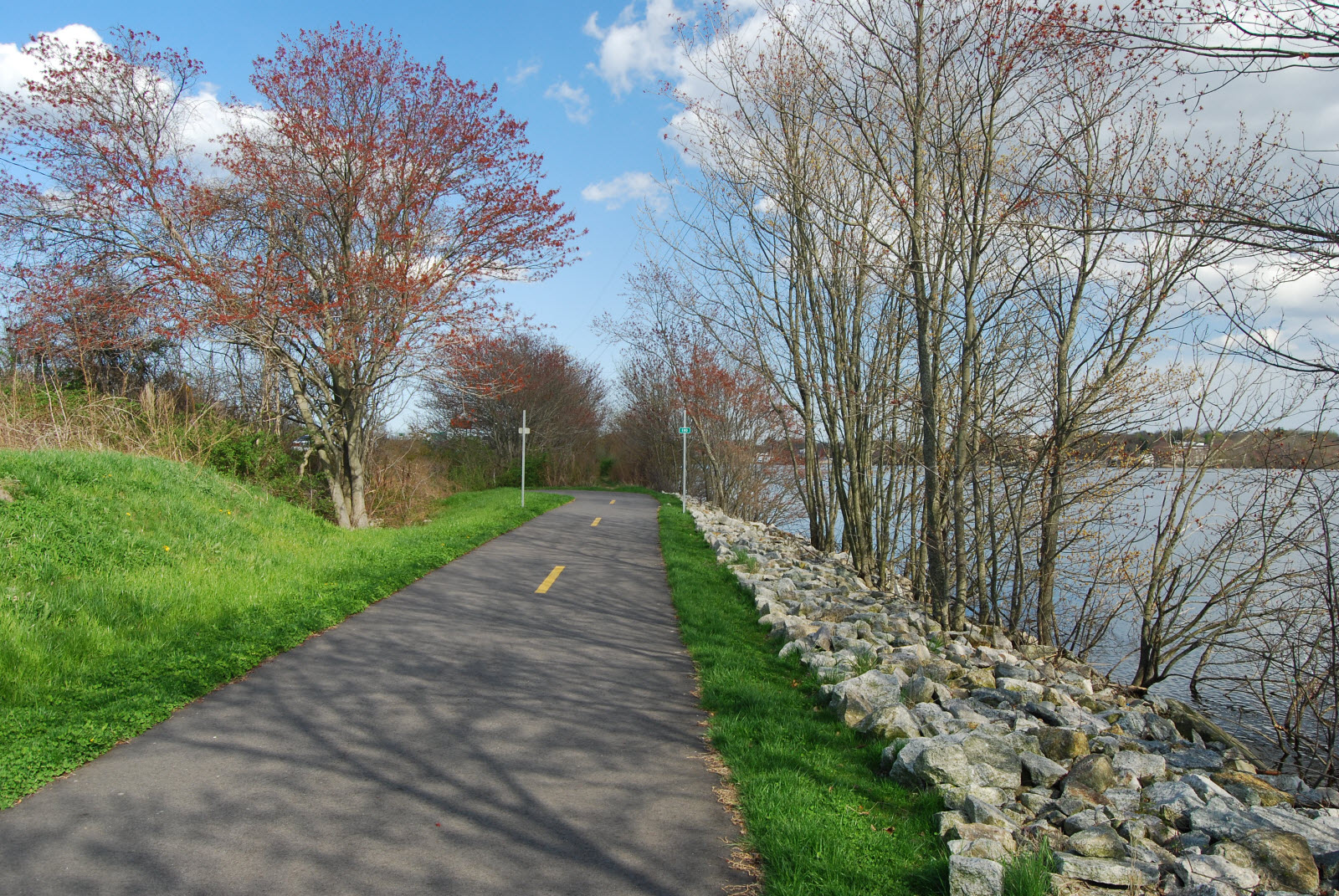
Bike path along South Watuppa Pond, Fall River, Massachusetts

The Watuppa Ponds are two large, naturally occurring, spring-fed, glacially formed ponds located in Fall River and Westport, Massachusetts. Watuppa is a native word meaning "place of boats". The two ponds were originally one body of water (originally one lake), connected by a narrow rocky strait called "The Narrows" located on a thin strip of land between the two ponds which forms part boundary of between Fall River and Westport. The border between Fall River and Westport is also divided between the two ponds. Together, the ponds have an overall north–south length of about 7.5 miles (or 8 miles including the pond swamps), and have an average east–west width of about a mile. The ponds are drained by the Quequechan River, which flows in a westerly direction through the center of Fall River from South Watuppa Pond to Mount Hope Bay.

== Description ==
With a surface area of 1,805 acres, (1760 acres) The North Watuppa Pond is the second-largest naturally occurring body of water within Massachusetts. It is about 4.2 miles long in the north–south direction, and averages about a mile in width. The North Watuppa Pond has 12.4 miles of shoreline and has a maximum depth of 25 feet and is strictly off limits to the public for any recreation. It has been used as the City of Fall River's primary drinking water supply since 1873, when the Fall River Waterworks was built on its western shore, at the end of Bedford Street. It drains into South Watuppa Pond by a small channel at its southern end, in an area known as The Narrows. The northeastern shore of North Watuppa Pond, known as Copicut Reservation, is sparsely developed, and contains a vast area of protected land as part of the city's water supply. Several small streams drain into the pond, including King Philip Brook, Queen Gutter Brook, and Blossom Brook, among others. The north end of North Watuppa Pond is crossed by a stone causeway, at the end of Wilson Road. The western shore of the reservoir contains a man-made canal that diverts stormwater runoff from the city to South Watuppa Pond. Public access to North Watuppa Pond is restricted, and the area is regularly patrolled by the city's water department. All activities including fishing, boating, swimming or skating are strictly prohibited. Including the pond swamp north of the causeway The North and South Watuppa Ponds together represent a complete 7.5 to 8 mile body of water.

The South Watuppa Pond contains 1,551 acres (1446 acres), and is the third-largest naturally occurring body of water within Massachusetts. The trumpet-shaped pond is about 3.0 miles long. It is about 0.5 miles wide at its southern end and about 1.5 miles wide at its northern end, with a large cove on the Westport side. The South Watuppa Pond contains 10.4 miles of shoreline and is on average 15 feet deep and contains maximum depth of 22 feet. It is fed by a combination of springs and streams, including Sucker Brook near its eastern shore which flows from Stafford Pond in nearby Tiverton, Rhode Island, as well as from the south by Stony Brook, which drains Sawdy Pond and Devol Pond. South Watuppa Pond is a popular fishing area with boat access from a city-managed public boat ramp located off the end of Jefferson Street, in an area known as "Dave's Beach". Some common fish species in the pond include largemouth bass, smallmouth bass, tiger muskie, white perch and black crappie.

== History ==
Prior to the 1862 boundary adjustment between Massachusetts and Rhode Island, South Watuppa Pond was located entirely within the town of Tiverton, Rhode Island, as was the southern third of North Watuppa Pond.

North Watuppa Pond once contained several ice houses along its western shore, beginning in the 1840s. The granite walls of one of these ice houses, built in 1864 by Robert Cook and William Durfee, still exist on a peninsula near the end of New Boston Road, at what was once known as Interlachen, the estate of Spencer Borden, founder of the Fall River Bleachery. Interlachen once contained a large mansion, gardens, horse pastures and a network of bridle paths. The house was demolished after the city acquired the land by eminent domain for the protection of the water supply. The foundation is all that remains of the Borden mansion today, and the land has mostly reverted to woods.

Until 1872, small steam-boats carried passengers from downtown Fall River to a picnic area on the eastern shore of North Watuppa Pond in Westport known as Adirondack Grove.

In 1875, the Fall River Railroad was completed along the north shore of South Watuppa Pond, over the Narrows. It provided a rail link from New Bedford to the eastern part of Fall River. The line carried freight traffic until the early 1980s. Eventually, the road connecting Fall River with Westport became designated as U.S. Route 6. It originally ran along the southern edge of North Watuppa Pond, creating a small pond between the road and the railroad, that became a popular spot for recreation, including ice skating in the winter. The adjacent north shore of South Watuppa Pond was for many years occupied by boat clubs, restaurants and other recreational establishments.

The Fall River Expressway was built along the western shore of North Watuppa Pond in the early 1950s. Now known as Route 24, it was later extended toward Tiverton along the western shore of South Watuppa Pond. In 1963, Interstate 195 was constructed through the Narrows dividing North and South Watuppa Ponds. Route 6 was re-routed to the south along Martine Street, and the small pond was filled in.

Historically, several textile factories have been located on the northern shores of South Watuppa Pond, including the Fall River Bleachery, Kerr Thread Mills, Lincoln Manufacturing Company, Stevens Manufacturing Company and Heywood Narrow Fabric Company. The eastern and southwestern shores of the pond is currently surrounded by many private residences, and public access is fairly limited. Many of these residences were damaged during the historic floods of March 2010.

The pond is also used for many recreational sports such as tubing, knee boarding and wake boarding and water skiing. The former railroad bed has also been converted into a multi-use rail trail.

== See also ==
- Fall River, Massachusetts
- Quequechan River
- Fall River Bleachery
