= Quequechan River =

Coordinates: 41°41′44″N 71°8′50″W

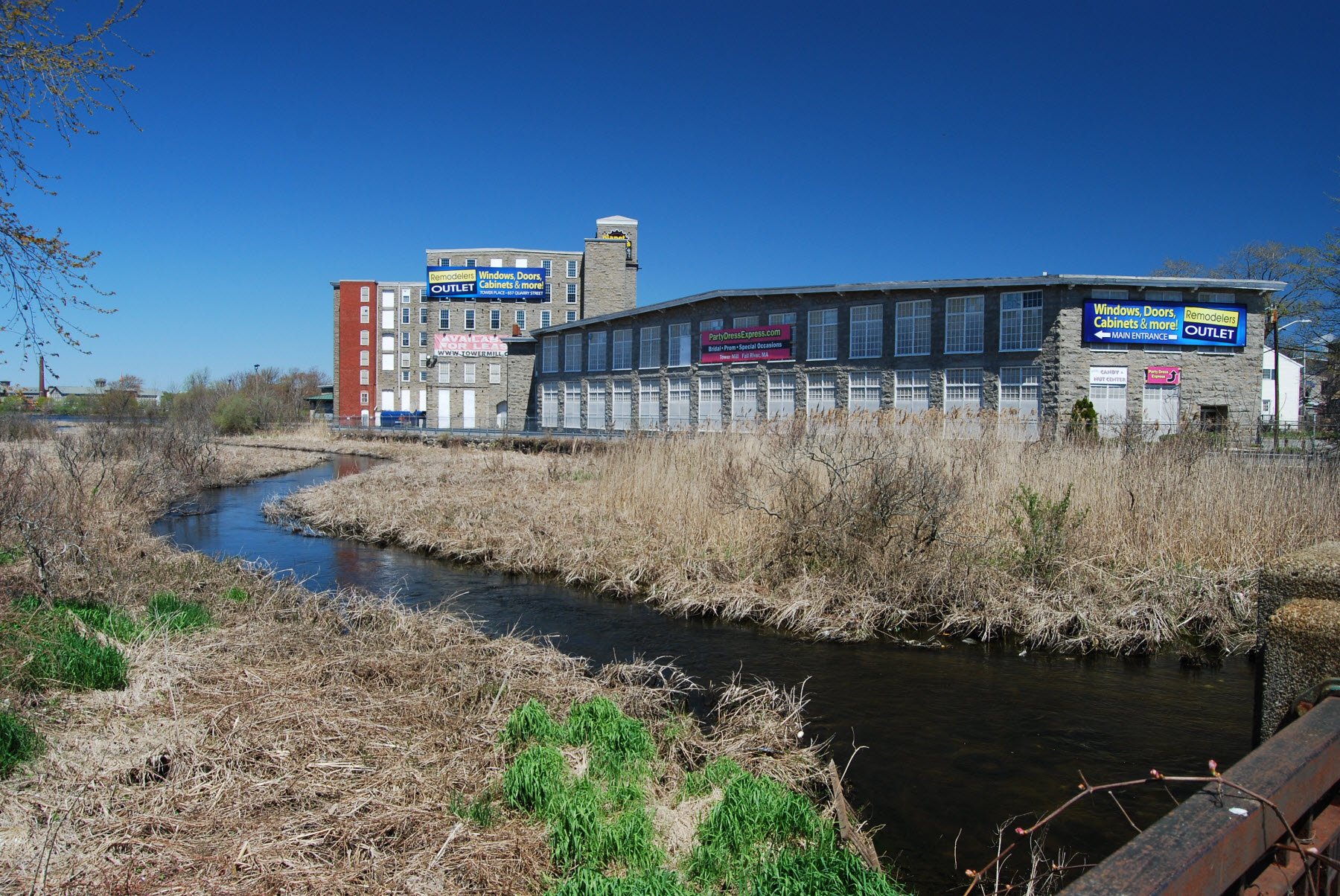
- View looking west from Quequechan Street, Fall River

Physical characteristics
- Source
  - location: South Watuppa Pond
  - elevation: 129 feet (39 m)
- Mouth
  - location: Taunton River
- Length: 2.5 mi (4.0 km)
- Basin size: 31 sq mi (80 km^{2})
- Discharge
  - average: 122 cu ft/s (3.5 m^{3}/s)

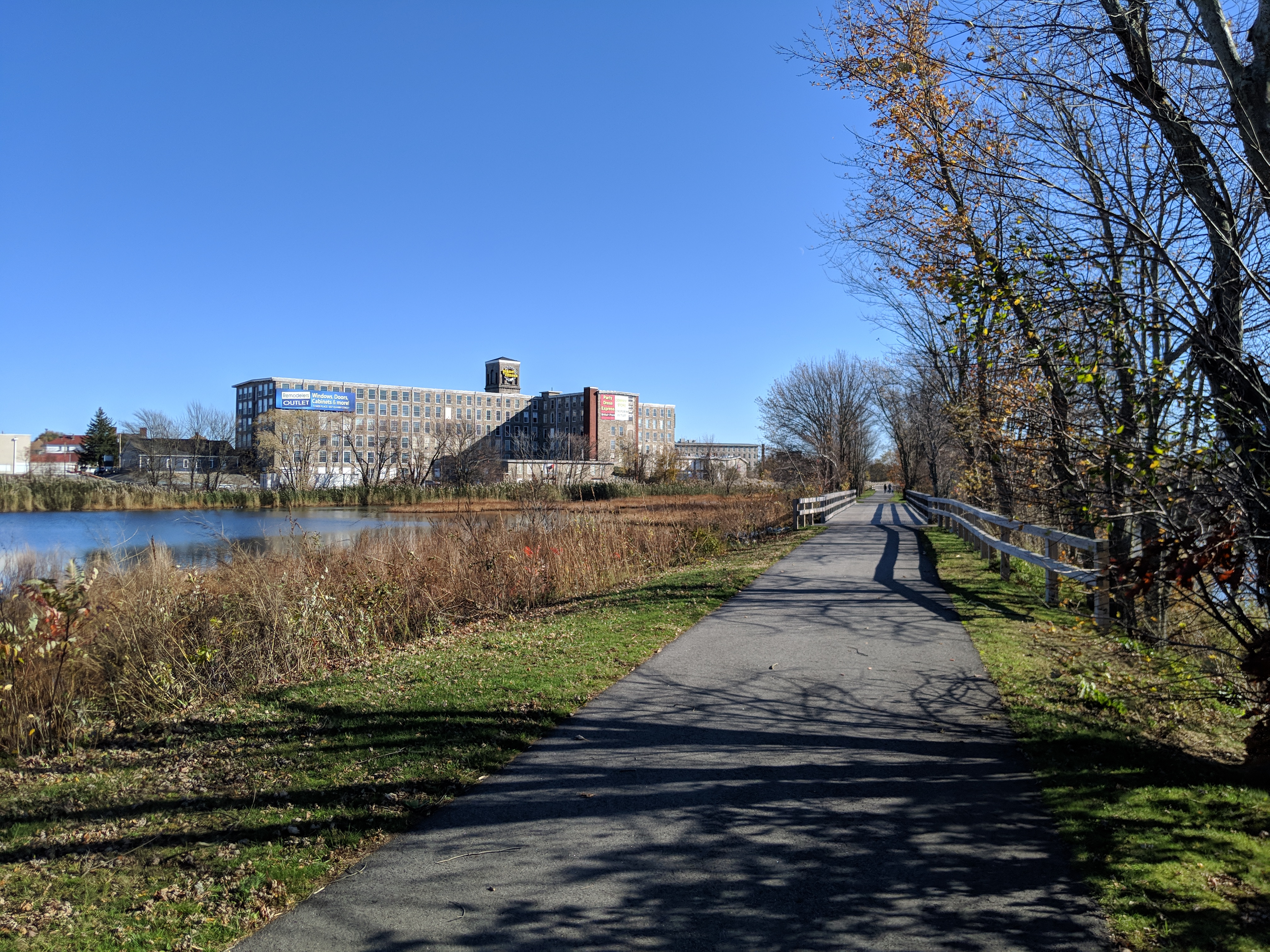
Quequechan River Rail Trail

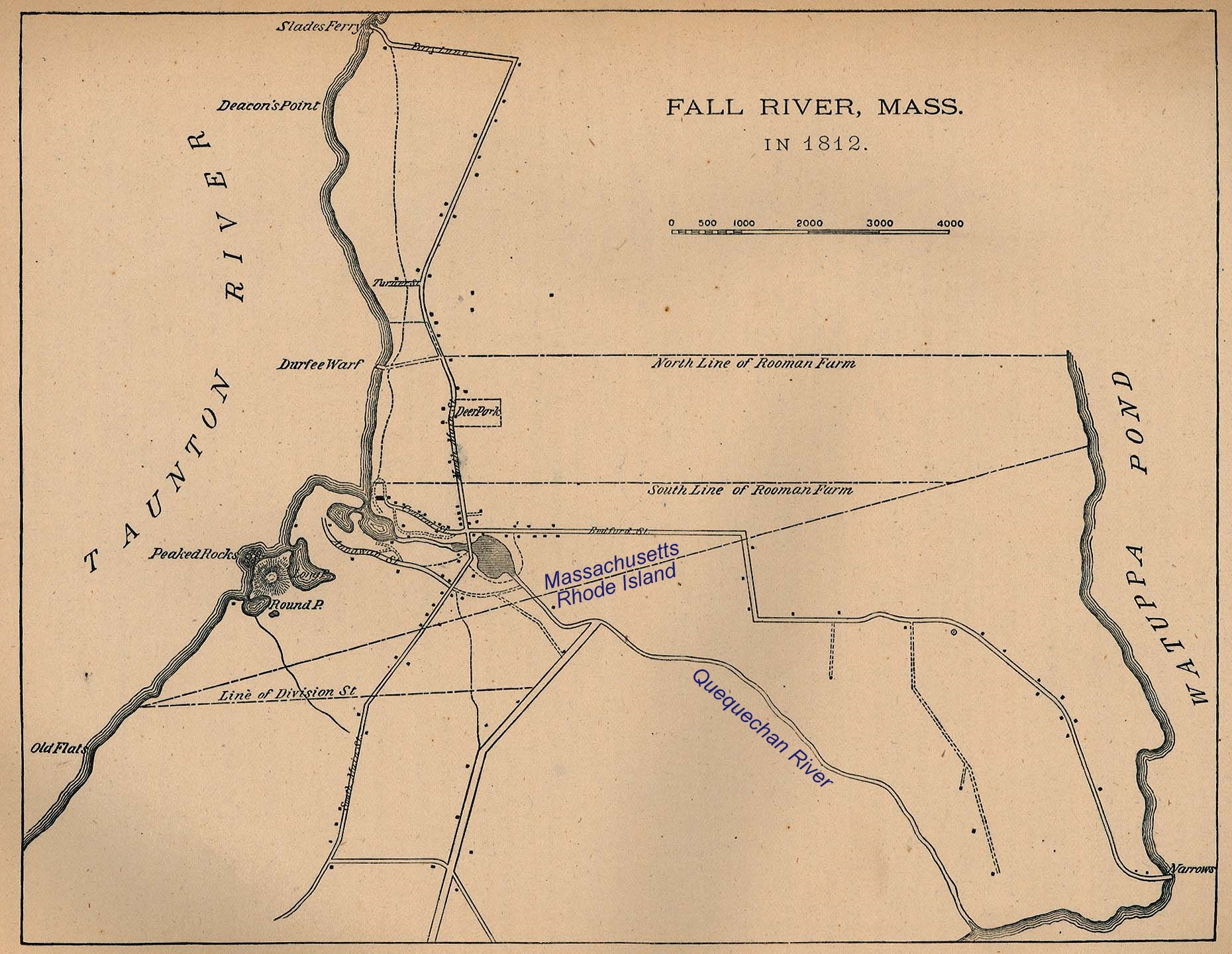
1812 Map of Fall River showing original location of Quequechan River

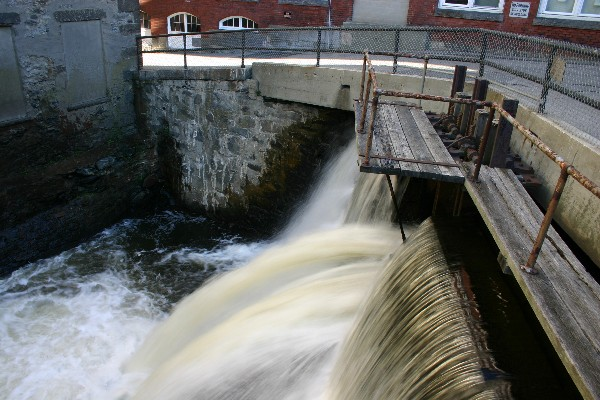
The falls today near Metacomet Mill, Anawan Street, Fall River

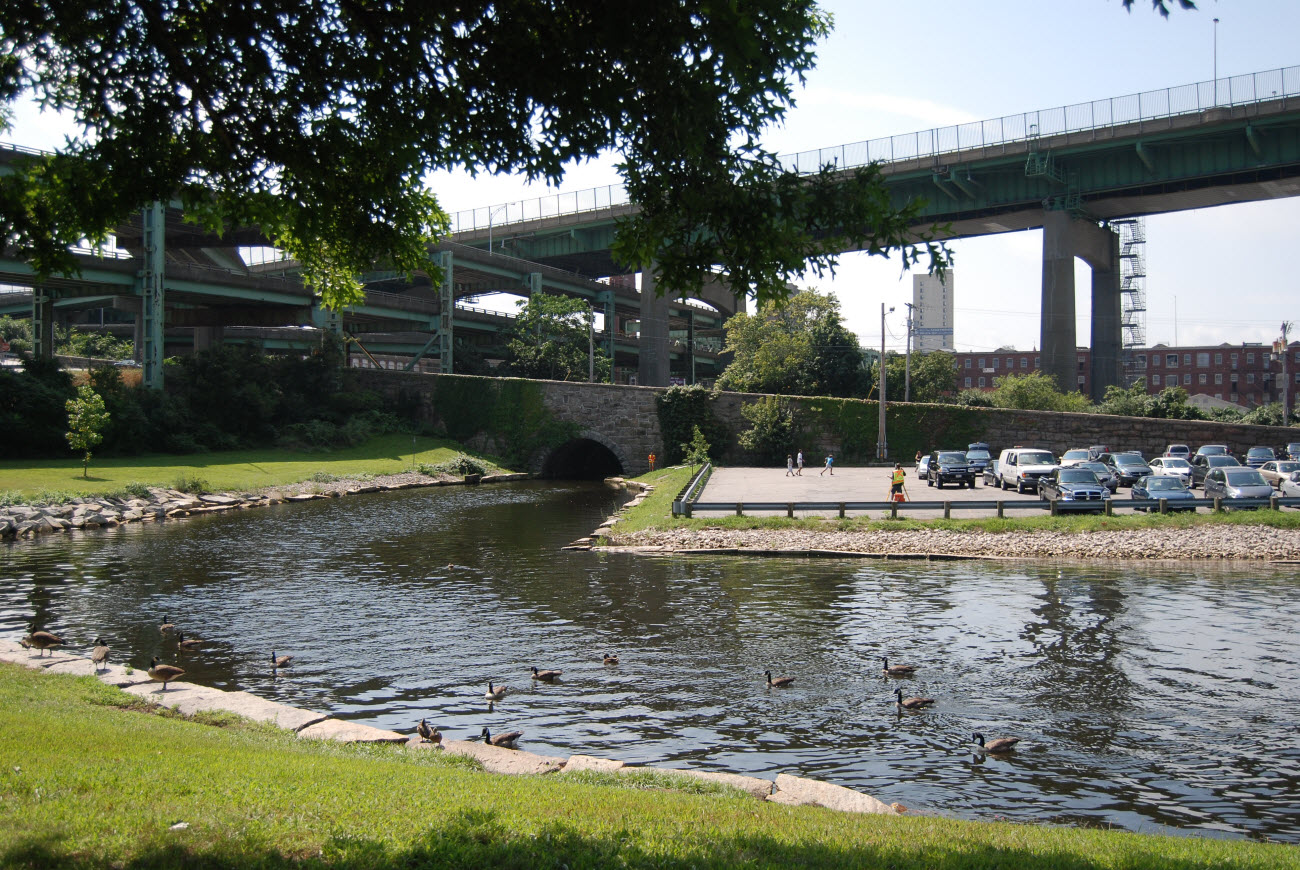
The mouth of the Quequechan near Battleship Cove

The Quequechan River is a river in Fall River, Massachusetts, that flows in a northwesterly direction from the northwest corner of the South Watuppa Pond through the heart of the city of Fall River and into the end of the Taunton River at Mount Hope Bay at Heritage State Park/Battleship Cove. The word Quequechan means "Falling River" or "Leaping/Falling Waters" in Wampanoag, hence the city's name.

The river is 2.5 miles (4.0 km) and is mostly placid and stagnant in certain places, until it nears downtown Fall River near City Hall, where a quickly declining grade causes it to turn rapid down the hill into Mount Hope Bay/Taunton River. From 1813, with the establishment of the Fall River Manufactory, the river enabled Fall River to establish itself as a leading textile center during the early 19th century. It originally contained a series of eight small waterfalls in a narrow stream between what is now South Main Street and the tidal Taunton River. During the first half of the 19th century, the "Fall River" was nearly completely covered by textile mills. The upper portion of the river, east of Pleasant Street, was dammed to provide additional water power and storage for the mills.

Between 1913 and 1914, the city of Fall River put together the Quequechan River Report published in 1915, to look into the problems the river was presented with. During the hot summer months, the water flowed very low and slowly and the water quality was becoming questionable. Chemical reactions were occurring occasionally on the river's edge from industrial mill wastes combined with hot water discharge, human wastes and other wastes (a dump was located on the river), causing further sanitary health concerns, and critical interest in the river in general.

During the 1960s, Interstate 195 was constructed through the city along the length of the Quequechan River. The portion west of Plymouth Avenue was routed underground through a series of box culverts, while much of the eastern section "mill pond" was filled in for the highway embankment including the start of the Quequechan River being filled in for Exit 2 on Route 24, and portions of Route 24 and 195 built directly on the Quequechan River resulting in a change in the water flow, fish and wildlife over the years. There is a bike path on the abandoned railroad that parallels Interstate 195 directly over the Quequechan, and plans to expose the falls where they were downtown are often discussed.

== Geography ==
The river consists of two distinct parts - a flat upper portion that flows between South Watuppa Pond and Troy Street and a steep, rapid section between Troy Street and the Taunton River near Battleship Cove.

The upper, eastern portion of the river was originally a relatively narrow and shallow stream flowing through a flat, wide valley of glacial deposits overlaying a deep granite ridge. Portions of the granite are exposed at the surface near what is today Brayton Avenue and also near Quequechan Street which was home to a Native American encampment on a small peninsula on the sand bar of the northwest corner on the South Watuppa where the Quequechan River begins and along the first mile of the Quequechan River.

The steep, western portion of the river between downtown and the waterfront originally consisted of a series of eight small waterfalls confined within a narrow, rocky bed. In the last half-mile (800 m) the total drop is about 132 feet (40 m) and the average flow is 122 cubic feet per second (3.5 m^{3}/s).

The last 1,000 feet (300 m; 0.19 mi) of the 2.5 mile length of the Quequechan River empties out into the end of the Taunton River at the head of Mount Hope Bay at Heritage Park making the total length of the Quequechan River at 2.5 miles.

== History ==
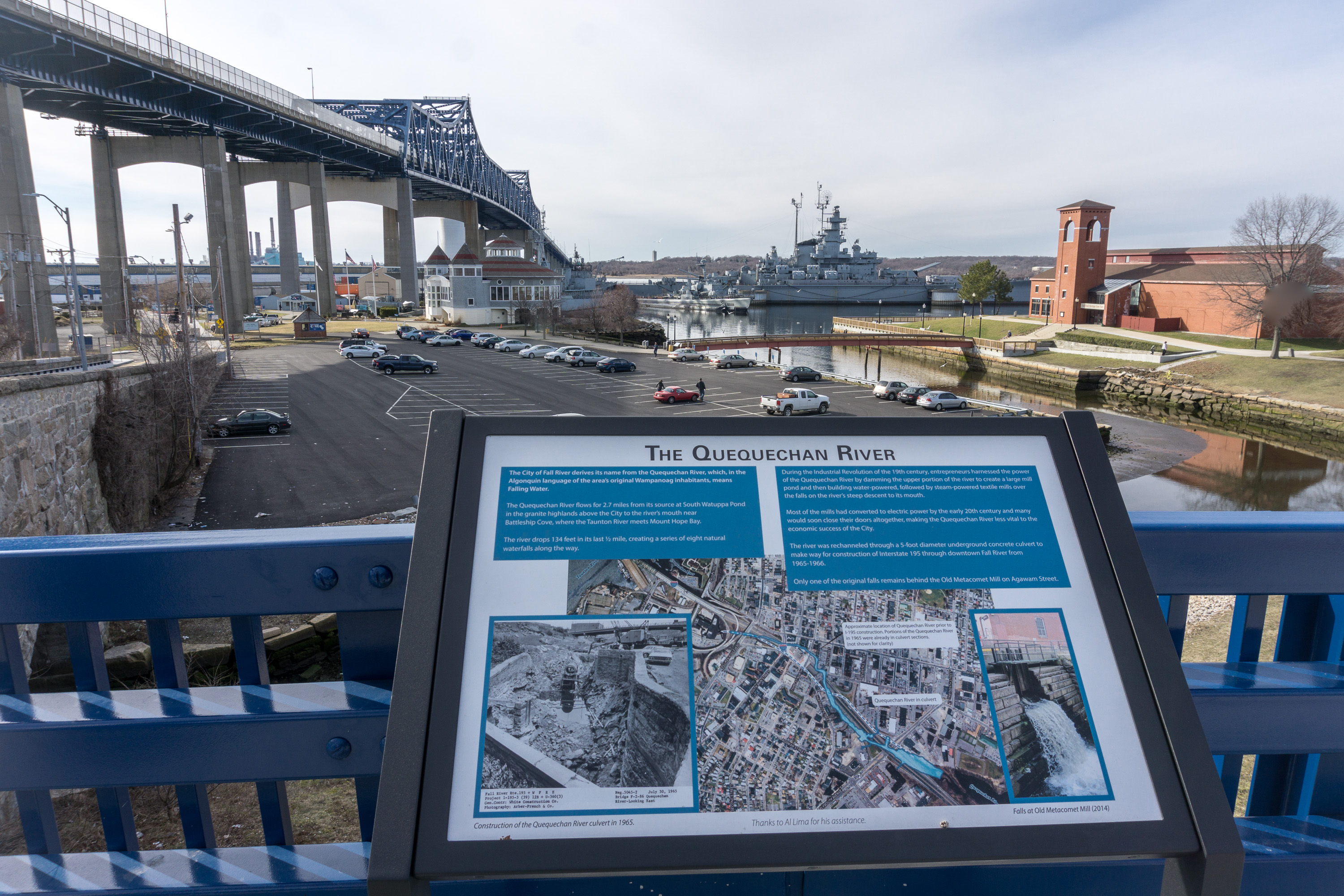
A sign tells about the route and history of the Quequechan River.

The earliest use of the river for industrial purposes occurred in 1703 when Benjamin Church established a grist mill with a small dam just west of what is now South Main Street. In the years that followed, several other small mills would be established along the "Fall River", including fulling and saw mills. Later on, another grist mill was established to the east of Main Street, with a small dam about two feet high. In 1813, when the Troy Cotton & Woolen Company was established at this same site, the old dam was demolished and replace with a new dam three feet high. In 1826, several mill owners established the Watuppa Reservoir Company and obtained permission to raise the Troy Dam an additional two feet, impounding a much larger area of water stretching all the way to the South Watuppa Pond. This portion of the Quequechan River became known as the "mill pond". The Watuppa Reservoir Company was required to pay damages to the landowners behind the dam whose properties were flooded. The damming also created several small islands within the pond. The original members of the Watuppa Reservoir Company were David Anthony, Nathaniel B. Borden, Oliver Chace and Bradford Durfee.

Until 1862, nearly the entire eastern "mill pond" portion of the river was located in what was then part of Rhode Island, as the state line cut diagonally through the area from Mount Hope Bay to North Watuppa Pond. The steep western portion of the river was located entirely within Massachusetts. Prior to the Civil War, the entire eastern portion of the river remained fairly rural.

By the late 1840s the water power potential of the "Fall River" had been maximized. In 1849, the Wamsutta Steam Woolen Mill was the first establishment to be erected "above the falls". It was built on what was called Wardrope's Island. In 1859, the Union Mills was built further upstream along Pleasant Street, on the north bank of the river. These steam mills, and the many others that followed would rely on the river to provide a source of cool water for operation of their steam engines. The mills also used water for various processes involved in the manufacture of textiles. Hot, and used water was later returned directly to the river.

In the years following the Civil War, with both sides of the river, and both Watuppa Ponds entirely within Massachusetts, there would be a remarkable expansion of the cotton textile industry within Fall River. Between 1865 and 1869, several new mills were constructed on the river's north bank, including the Durfee Mills, the Merchants Mill, and the second Union Mill. During this same period, on the south bank of the river, new mills included the Tecumseh, Robeson and the Davol Mills. Then, between 1870 and 1873, an even more remarkable expansion took place within the city. Twenty-two new corporations were formed, building dozens of new mills, many within the Quequechan River valley. Many areas along the river were filled in to create new land for development.

The 1870s would also mark the rapid development of the eastern part of the city, which became known as Flint Village. In 1875, the Fall River Railroad was built to provide a rail connection with New Bedford. The railroad passed through the "Narrows" located between the North and South Watuppa Ponds, and over the shallow "mill pond" to Watuppa Station located at Plymouth Avenue.

By the 1880s the quality of the water in the Quequechan River became a problem. During periods of low water, the extensive area of "flats" became covered in a putrid muck consisting of industrial and human waste and various other garbage. Mills were often forced to shut down during dry periods for lack of cool, clear water to operate with. The city hired experts and various proposals were made over the years to fix the problem, but no action was taken. Finally, 30 years later after the problems of pollution in 1883 were first recognized and begun to be taken seriously, in 1913 the State Legislature established the Watuppa Ponds and Quequechan River Commission to investigate and finally find a solution to the problems. In 1915, Boston consulting civil engineers Fay, Spofford and Thorndike provided a lengthy report and designs to provide a permanent solution both the quality and quantity of water within the Quequechan River. The consultant's solution called for a three-compartment conduit with a lower level to carry sanitary sewer flows away from the river and toward Mount Hope Bay, a middle level to provide the mills with cool, clean water, and an upper level to carry hot water from the mills back to South Watuppa Pond for eventual reuse.

== Post-industrial period ==
The Great Fall River Fire of 1928 destroyed the Pocasset Mills and the adjacent Granite Block, which had both been constructed directly over the river to the east of Main Street. For the first time in decades, this portion of the river had been exposed. While the Granite Block was soon rebuilt, the falls of the Pocasset Mills would remain exposed until the 1960s. In 1932, the current Post Office was constructed over the river in the area between the Troy Mills and City Hall.

== Highway era ==
After World War II, the Massachusetts and other state governments began planning new highways to link the major cities of the region in order to ease congestion on city streets, promote economic development and for defense purposes. By the early 1950s, construction began on the Fall River Expressway to provide a direct link between Boston and Fall River. Similarly, the coastal cities in Southern New England proposed a "Tri-State" highway linking areas such as New Haven with Providence and Cape Cod. Early plans called for a "high level" bridge to be built across the Taunton River to the north of the Brightman Street Bridge. The highway was to pass through the north end of Fall River and connect directly with Wareham, Massachusetts. However, business leaders in New Bedford and downtown Fall River protested, claiming the highway would allow patrons to by-pass their cities altogether.

By the late 1950s with the passing of the landmark Federal Aid Highway Act of 1956, the location of the new highway was shifted south and included a high-level bridge across the Taunton River with a route through the center of Fall River through the Narrows and onto New Bedford and Cape Cod. The proposed highway would also require the demolition of the Second Granite Block, old City Hall, the Troy Mills and several other buildings. Much of the highway was constructed within the area of the former "mill pond".

The portion of the Quequechan River between Plymouth Avenue and the waterfront was redirected into a series of underground culverts, passing under Interstate 195 to a new gate house located at the corner of Hartwell and Fourth Street. From there, it then flows parallel to the south side of the highway to Pocasset Street, passing under the Fall River Chamber of Commerce property and highway ramps before re-emerging on the uphill side of the former American Printing Company Mill #7 before it passes under the mill. It is also visible on the downhill side of this mill before it flows under the Metacomet Mill. The river then reappears under the Braga Bridge before flowing under the stone arch of Central Street and into Battleship Cove.

The river is no longer used for industrial purposes.

== Recent history ==
In July 2009, the city completed the first phase of a $185 million Combined Sewer Overflow Project, consisting of a 20-foot (6.1 m) diameter deep rock tunnel designed to capture wet weather sewer overflows which previously entered the Quequechan River and Mount Hope Bay and divert these flows toward the city's sewer treatment plant instead. The project is expected to result in a dramatic improvement of the water quality in the river.

Other plans propose to "daylight" the falls, restore or re-create them, and build a green belt with a connection to the waterfront.

== See also ==
- American Printing Co. and Metacomet Mill
- Barnard Mills
- Chace Mills
- Cornell Mills
- Crescent Mill
- Durfee Mills
- Fall River Government Center
- Flint Mills
- Hargraves Mill No. 1
- History of Fall River, Massachusetts
- Pilgrim Mills
- Quequechan Valley Mills Historic District
- Seaconnett Mills
- Stafford Mills
- Union Mills
- Wampanoag Mills
