= History of Fall River, Massachusetts =

Fall River, MA (1670 - 2026)

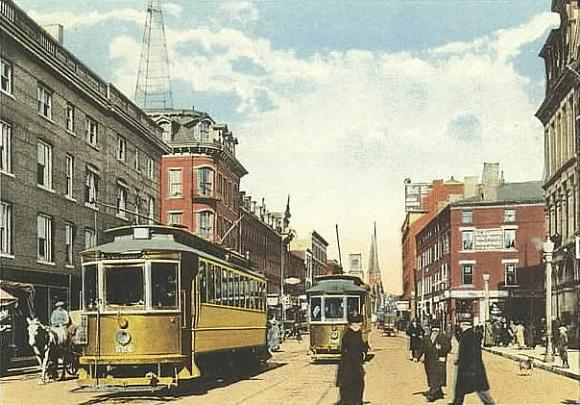
North Main Street, 1910

For much of its history, the city of Fall River, Massachusetts has been defined by the rise and fall of its cotton textile industry. From its beginnings as a rural outpost of the Plymouth Colony, the city grew to become the largest textile producing center in the United States during the 19th century, with over one hundred mills in operation by 1920. Even with the demise of local textile productions during the 20th century, there remains a lasting legacy of its impact on the city.

== Early history ==
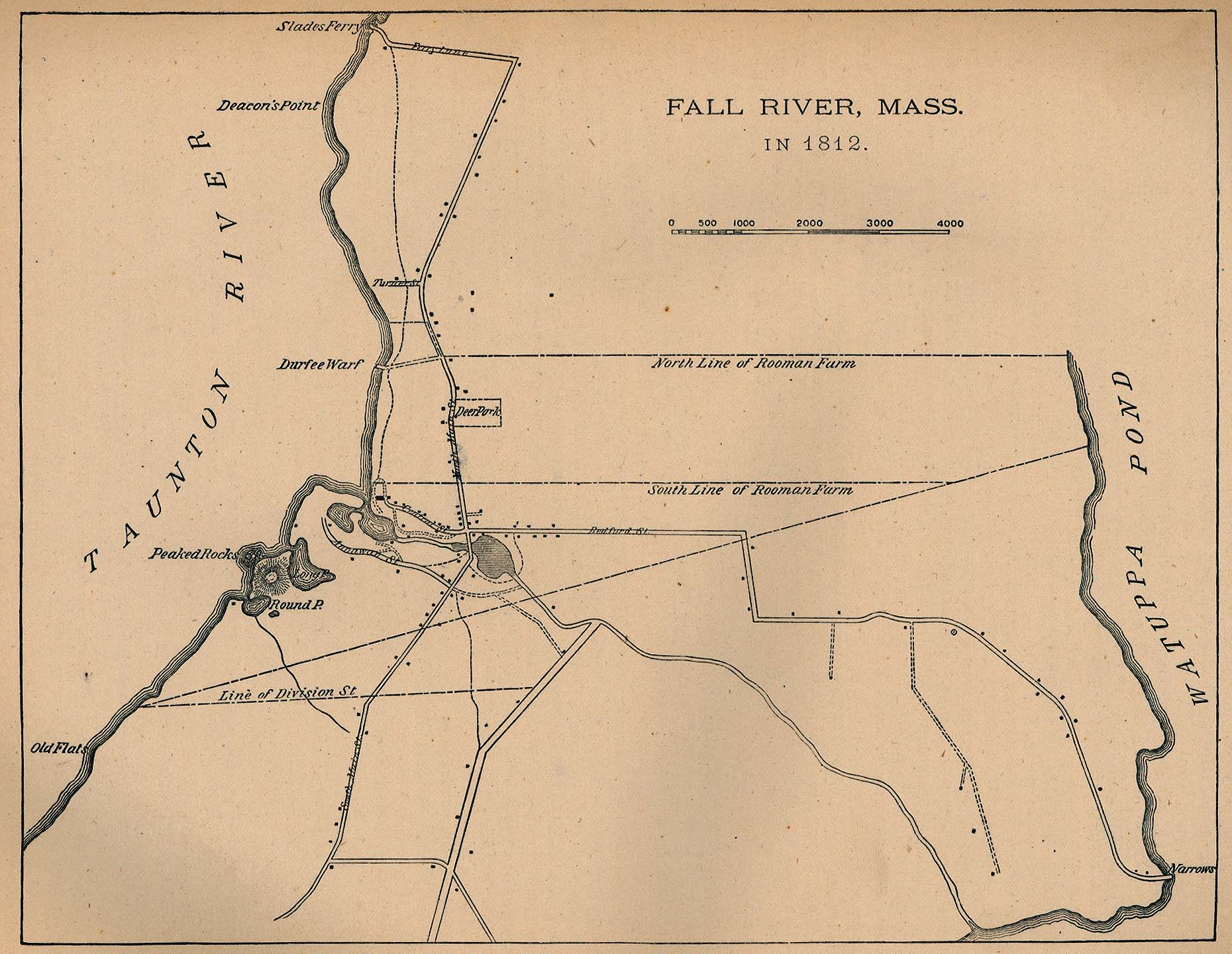
1812 Map of Fall River. The diagonal line represents the border between Massachusetts and Rhode Island

At the time of the establishment of the Plymouth Colony in 1620, the area that later became the city of Fall River was inhabited by the Pocasset Wampanoag tribe, headquartered at Mount Hope in what is now Bristol, Rhode Island. The "falling" river that the name Fall River refers to is the Quequechan River (pronounced "Quick-a-shan" by locals). Quequechan is a Wampanoag word believed to mean "Falling River" or "Leaping/Falling Waters."

In 1653, Freetown, Massachusetts was settled at Assonet Bay by members of the Plymouth Colony, as part of Freeman's Purchase, which included the northern part of what is now Fall River. In 1683 Freetown was incorporated as a town within the colony. The southern part of what is now Fall River was incorporated as the town of Tiverton, as part of the Massachusetts Bay Colony in 1694, a few years after the merger with the Plymouth Colony. In 1746, in the settlement of a long colonial boundary dispute between Rhode Island and Massachusetts, Tiverton was annexed to Rhode Island, along with Little Compton and what is now Bristol County, Rhode Island. The state boundary was placed approximately at what is now Columbia Street.

In 1703, Benjamin Church, a prominent veteran of King Philip's War, established a sawmill, a gristmill and a fulling mill on the Quequechan River. In 1714, Church sold his land, including the water rights, to Richard Borden of Tiverton and his brother Joseph. (This transaction became extremely valuable 100 years later, helping to establish the Borden family as the leaders in the development of Fall River's textile industry.)

Native settlement during this time was confined to a reservation near what is now Notre Dame Cemetery. Later the reservation was shifted to the eastern shore of Watauppa Pond. The reservation fell apart in the early 20th century.

By the mid-18th century, Thomas Borden (son of Richard) operated a sawmill and a gristmill on the south bank of the Quequechan River, while Joseph Borden ran a fulling mill further upstream. Steven Borden operated a gristmill and sawmill on the north bank of the river. During this time, settlement also occurred in the northern part of modern-day Fall River, along what is now North Main Street. The oldest remaining house in Fall River, located on French Street, was built in 1750.

On May 25, 1778, during the American Revolutionary War, the Battle of Freetown was fought when about 150 English soldiers, under the command of Major Ayers, sailed up Mount Hope Bay in the night and landed near the mouth of the Quequechan River. Spotted by a sentinel, the ship was fired upon by several local minutemen, their gunfire returned by cannon fire. Several British soldiers disembarked to lay siege on the village, burning the house, gristmill and sawmill of Thomas Borden, and taking his aged father, Richard, prisoner, burning his house as well. The prisoner was eventually released after several days, and the British retreated from Freetown altogether. The Freetown minutemen were aided by a colonist militia from the Tiverton outpost led by Captain Joseph Durfee, a war veteran recently returned from a battle at White Plains and son of Thomas Durfee Esq. of Freetown. The British suffered two casualties as a result of the light fighting. The colonists suffered no losses.

Later in 1788 during the Revolutionary War, the area was visited by the Marquis de Lafayette, the famed French war hero who was a guest of Joseph Durfee's father Thomas Durfee. The 1750s-vintage house is now located at 94 Cherry Street in Fall River, and is open to the public for tours. Today, Lafayette Park in the city's East End is named for the French war hero.

== Town of Fall River established ==
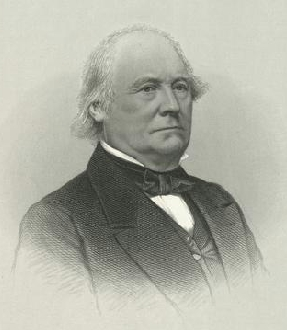
Richard Borden

On February 26, 1803 "Fallriver", Massachusetts was incorporated as a town. A year later, on June 1, 1804, Fallriver changed its name to "Troy". The name "Troy" was used for 30 years and was officially changed to the separated "Fall River" on February 12, 1834.

The early town consisted of about two dozen families, including Richard Borden and his father Thomas. (His grandfather, Richard (Sr.) (b.1722 d.1795) had been kidnapped by the British in May 1778, according to "Reminiscences of Colonel Joseph Durfee,"[7] who was then a Captain of the local Freetown Militia.) The other notable family names included Durfee, Buffington, Davol and Cook.

The First Congregational Church in Fall River was organized in 1816. The church began with five members. Their first meeting house was dedicated in 1823. Some years later, they sold it to the Unitarian Society. That society later sold it to the city, which made a schoolhouse of it. It was burned in the great fire of July 1843.

Other early churches established in Fall River include the First Baptist Church (1825), Methodist Church (1826), Unitarian Society (1832), and the Episcopal Church of the Ascension (1836). Irish Catholics had been established in a small house by 1836, with their first church, St. John the Baptist, dedicated in 1840.

=== The two Fall Rivers ===
During this time, the southern part of what is now Fall River (south of Columbia Street) remained part of Tiverton, Rhode Island. In 1856, the town of Tiverton voted to split off its industrial northern section as Fall River, Rhode Island. In 1861, after decades of dispute, the United States Supreme Court moved the boundary to what is now State Avenue, thereby creating a City of Fall River entirely within Massachusetts. (Also as part of this decision, Pawtucket, Massachusetts became part of Pawtucket, Rhode Island.)

=== The great fire of 1843 ===
By 1843, the town of Fall River was a bustling center of about 8,000 people, along with the adjacent population in what was then still Tiverton, Rhode Island. On Sunday, July 2, 1843, with the temperatures in the 90s, a fire alarm rang out around 4 p.m. Water in the Quequechan River had been stopped so that some work could be done. The fire had begun when two boys were playing with a small cannon, igniting a pile of wood shavings near the corner of Main and Borden Street. Fed by high, dry winds, the entire space of buildings between Main, Franklin, Rock and Borden streets soon became engulfed in fire, beyond the control of firefighters. Much more destruction may have occurred if it had not been for a change in wind direction which blew the flames back toward the charred areas. The conflagration destroyed a total of 291 buildings over about 20 acres (81,000 m^{2}) at the heart of the town.

About 200 families were left homeless by the blaze. The city lost vital shops, the custom house, post office, hotels, churches, and banks. An appeal for relief was made on July 4, 1843, by local officials. A total of over $50,000 (equivalent to $1,728,000 in 2025) was donated by people in Boston, Cambridge, Providence, New Bedford and other local towns.

== Early industrial development (1811-1865) ==
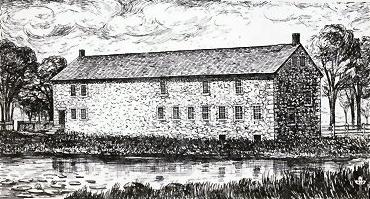
Durfee's Mill, 1811

The early development of the textile industry in Fall River grew out of the developments made in nearby Rhode Island, beginning with Samuel Slater at Pawtucket in 1793.

In 1811, Col. Joseph Durfee, the American Revolutionary War veteran and hero of the Battle of Freetown in 1778, established the Globe Manufactory (a spinning mill) at the outlet of Cook Pond, near what is now Globe Corners in the city's South End. This was the first textile mill in the city of Fall River (although it was still in Rhode Island at the time). It was never very successful. The first mill burned a few years later and was rebuilt and reorganized by Oliver Chace in 1813. It later operated as a print works from 1829 to 1839, being known as the Riverton Print Works from 1835 to 1839; later owned by Globe Yarn Co.; later by Laurel Lake Mills.

The real development of Fall River's industry, however, occurred along the falling river from which it was named, about a mile north of Durfee's first mill. The Quequechan River's eight falls combined to make Fall River the best tidewater privilege in southern New England. It was perfect for industrialization - big enough for profit and expansion, yet small enough to be developed by local capital without interference from Boston.

The Fall River Manufactory was established by David Anthony and others in 1813. That same year, Oliver Chace and others founded the Troy Cotton & Woolen Manufactory in 1813, at the top end of the falls. Originally from Swansea, Massachusetts, Chace had worked as a carpenter for Samuel Slater in his early years.

In 1817, the Fall River Manufactory installed the first power looms in the city.

The Pocasset Manufacturing Company was established in 1821, just downstream from the Troy Mill, across the street from where the Herald News is today. Oliver Chace served as its first agent.

=== Fall River Iron Works ===
In 1821, Col. Richard Borden established the Fall River Iron Works along with Maj. Bradford Durfee at the lower part of the Quequechan River. Bradford Durfee was a shipwright, and Richard Borden was the owner of a grist mill. After an uncertain start, in which some early investors pulled out, the Fall River Iron Works was incorporated in 1825, with $200,000 in capital. The iron works began producing nails, bar stock, and other items such as bands for casks in the nearby New Bedford whaling industry. They soon gained a reputation for producing nails of high quality, and business flourished. By 1845, the company was valued at $960,000. In 1827, Col. Borden began regular steamship service to Providence.

The iron works continued to play an important role in the early development of the textile industry in Fall River. Richard Borden later constructed the Metacomet Mill in 1847, which today is the oldest remaining textile (cloth-producing) mill in the city, located on Anawan Street.

Also in 1847, the Fall River Gas Company was established by the iron works. Gas was produced by heating coal and capturing the gas in a special process.

=== Cloth printing ===
In 1824, Andrew Robeson, arrived from New Bedford and established the first print Works in the city, a segment of the industry that Fall River dominated in later years.

By 1833 Fall River had 13 cotton mills, employing 1,200 people, with 31,000 total spindles (a common measure of total spinning capacity) and 1,050 looms.

The American Print Works was established in 1835 by Holder Borden, uncle of Colonel Richard. With the leadership of the Borden family, the American Print Works (later known as the American Printing Company) became the largest and most important textile company in the city, employing thousands at its peak in the early 20th century.

=== Other factories ===
Oliver Chace established a thread mill on Bay Street in 1838. It was later used as an office as part of the Connanicut Mills. Today, it is the oldest remaining textile factory in the city, although it never produced cloth.

Nearby, a twine mill was established by Augustus Chace and William Trafford in 1845, on the stream from Cook Pond. It later became known as the Wyoming Thread Mill. In the later 19th century it became part of the Marshall Hat Company and was greatly added onto with a large brick mill.

By 1845, the Quequechan's available power had been all but maximized. The Massasoit Mill, located near what is now Heritage State Park, was established in 1846 as the first mill in the city to be powered by steam engine. However, it was another decade or so when the improvements in the steam engine by George Corliss enabled the construction of the first large steam-powered mill in the city, the Union Mills in 1859 on Pleasant Street. It was the first mill to be built "above the dam" along the Quequechan River.

The Wamsutta Steam Woolen Mill was built in 1846, above the dam near Pleasant Street.

The loom-making firm of Kilburn, Lincoln & Co. traces its roots to an 1847 merger of E.C. Kilburn, which made looms, and J.T. Lincoln, which built shafting components. Kilburn, Lincoln & Co. looms became well known in the textile industry during the late 19th century.

The American Linen Company was founded in 1852 on Ferry Street for the manufacture of fine linen fabrics. However, in 1858, with demand for linens low, it was converted for the manufacture of cotton print cloth, although the name "American Linen Company" remained. The production of linen was gradually phased out.

=== Infrastructure ===
Fall River's port played a vital role in the city's fortunes for much of its history. It was designated a port of entry by the federal government as early as 1837, when that designation was switched from nearby Dighton. Coal began to be imported from Nova Scotia as early as 1833, along with iron from Sweden.

Colonel Richard Borden also established the first railroad line to serve Fall River, the Fall River Branch Railroad, which was incorporated in 1844 and opened about 1845. Two years later, regular steamship service to New York City began. Known as the Fall River Line, it was America's most luxurious steamship line, connecting rail travelers from Boston to Manhattan. It operated until 1937.

The Old Colony Railroad and Fall River Railroad merged in 1854, forming the Old Colony and Fall River Railroad. That same year, Fall River was officially incorporated as a city and had a population of about 12,000. James Buffington served as its first mayor.

For three generations, the Borden family dynasty had control or business interests in the city's banks, the gas company, steamboats, railroads and mines.

== Cotton boomtown (1865-1923) ==
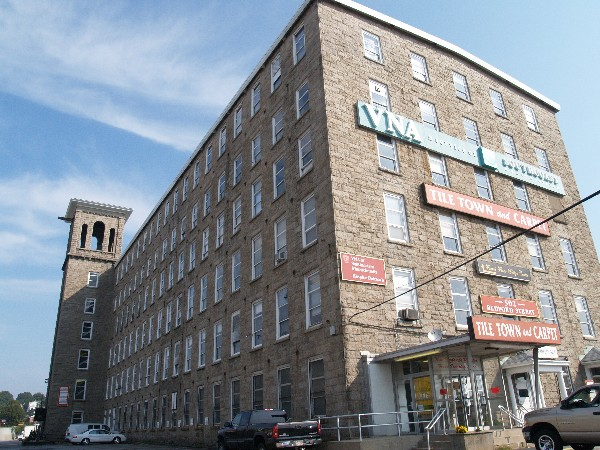
Granite Mill #2, Fall River

House Flag of Fall River Navigation Company

Fall River profited well from the Civil War and was in a fine position to take advantage of the prosperity that followed. By 1868, it had surpassed Lowell as the leading textile city in America with over 500,000 total spindles. It maintained this distinction until the mid-1920s, when it was overtaken by nearby New Bedford.

Destroyed by fire in 1867, the American Print Works was soon rebuilt in 1868. Several other new mills were established during the late 1860s, including the Davol, Mechanics and Durfee Mills.

Then, during 1871 and 1872, a most dramatic expansion occurred, when 15 new corporations were founded, building 22 new mills throughout the city, while some of the older mills expanded. The city's population increased by an astounding 20,000 people during these two years, while overall mill capacity double to more than 1,000,000 spindles.

On September 19, 1874, the deadliest fire in Fall River's history occurred at the Granite Mill. When the Granite Mill fire occurred, it quickly cut off access to the stair tower and the single exit. The fire department's ladders were not high enough to reach the victims. Workers on the sixth floor began jumping from windows in a desperate effort to escape the flames. Thirty were killed, and many more were injured for life. The mill was gutted and was later rebuilt. As a result of the tragedy, all mills were required to have at least two exits. Metal fire escapes were also required.

By 1876 the city had 1/6 of all New England cotton capacity, and one half of all print cloth production. "King Cotton" had definitely arrived. The "Spindle City", as it became known, was second in the world to only Manchester, England.

To house the thousands of new workers, mostly Irish and French Canadian immigrants during these years, over twelve thousand units of company housing were constructed. Unlike the well-spaced boardinghouses of early Lowell and Lawrence or the cottages of Rhode Island, worker housing in Fall River consisted of thousands of wood-framed multi-family tenements, usually three-story "triple-deckers" with up to six apartments. Many more privately owned tenements supplemented the company housing.

During the 19th century, the city of Fall River became famous for the granite rock upon which much of the city is built. Several granite quarries operated during this time, the largest of which was the Beattie Granite Quarry, located near what is now Quarry Street, near the corner of Locust. Many of the mills in the city were built from this native stone, and it was highly regarded as a building material for many public buildings and private homes alike. The Chateau-sur-Mer mansion in Newport, Rhode Island, is perhaps the best example of Fall River Granite being used for private home construction.

While most of the mills "above the hill" were constructed from native Fall River granite, nearly all of their counterparts along the Taunton River and Mount Hope Bay were made of red brick. This was due to the high costs associated with transporting the rock through the city and down the hill, where no rail lines existed because of the steep grades.

In 1911, the city hosted the "Cotton Centennial", a large celebration of the city's textile industry, which was attended by President William Howard Taft.

== Decline of the textile industry ==
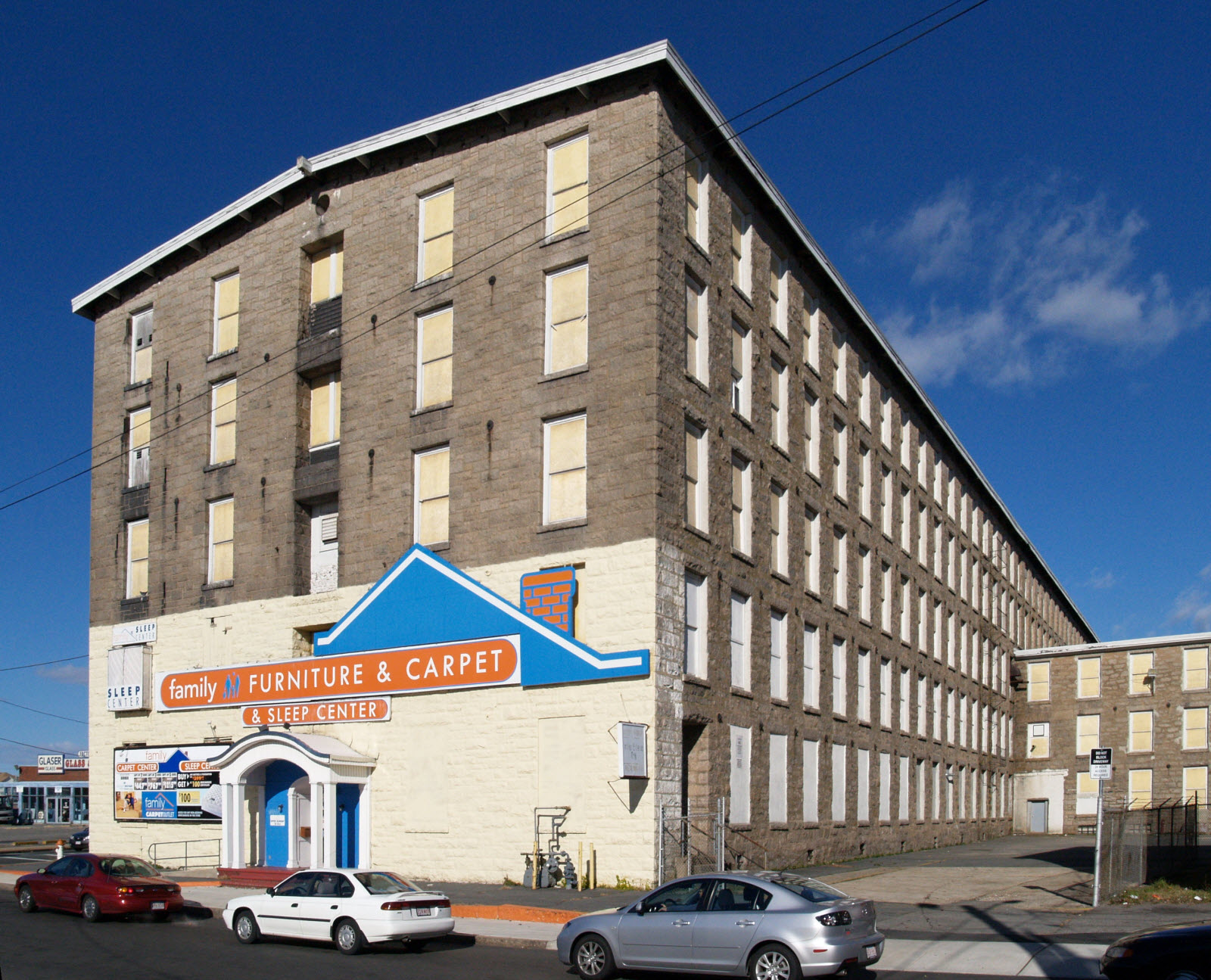
Stafford Mills, Fall River

The cotton mills of Fall River had built their business largely on only one product: print cloth. About 1910, the city's largest employer, the American Printing Company (APC), employed 6,000 people and was the largest company printer of cloth in the world. Dozens of other city mills solely produced print cloth to be printed at the APC. The city's industry truly had all its eggs in one very large basket.

World War I had provided a much needed demand for the textiles, and many of the mills of New England benefited during this time. The post-war economy quickly slowed, however, and production quickly outpaced demand. The northern mills faced serious competition from their southern counterparts due to factors such as lower labor and transportation costs, as well as the South's large investment in new machinery and other equipment. In 1923, Fall River faced the first wave of mill closures. In 1924, the American Printing Company opened a new plant in Kingsport, Tennessee, moving much of its operation there, and slashing many Fall River jobs in the process. Some mills merged and were able to limp along until the late 1920s. By the 1930s and the Great Depression, many more mills were out of business, and the city was bankrupt. A few somehow managed to survive through World War II and into the 1950s.

The worst fire in Fall River's history occurred on the evening of February 2, 1928, when workers were dismantling the recently vacated Pocasset Mill. During the night the fire spread quickly and wiped out a large portion of downtown. City Hall was spared, but was badly damaged. Today, many of the structures near the corner of North Main and Bedford Street date from the early 1930s, as they were rebuilt soon after the fire.

The once mighty American Printing Company finally closed for good in 1934. In 1937, their huge plant waterfront on Water Street was acquired by the Firestone Tire and Rubber Company and soon employed 2,600 people. In 1941, just five weeks before the attack on Pearl Harbor, a huge fire broke out in the old 1860s main building of the print works. The fire was a major setback to the U.S. war effort, as $15 million in raw rubber (30,000 lbs.) was lost in the inferno.

By 1940, there were just 17 companies still in operation, compared to 49 in 1917.

With the demise of the textile industry, many of the city's mills were occupied by various smaller companies, including the garment industry, traditionally based in the New York City area, but attracted to New England by the lure of cheap factory space and an eager workforce in need of jobs. By 1940, nearly one-fifth of the city's workforce was employed in the garment industry. This industry survived in the city well into the 1990s, but also became a victim of globalization and foreign competition.

== Modern era ==
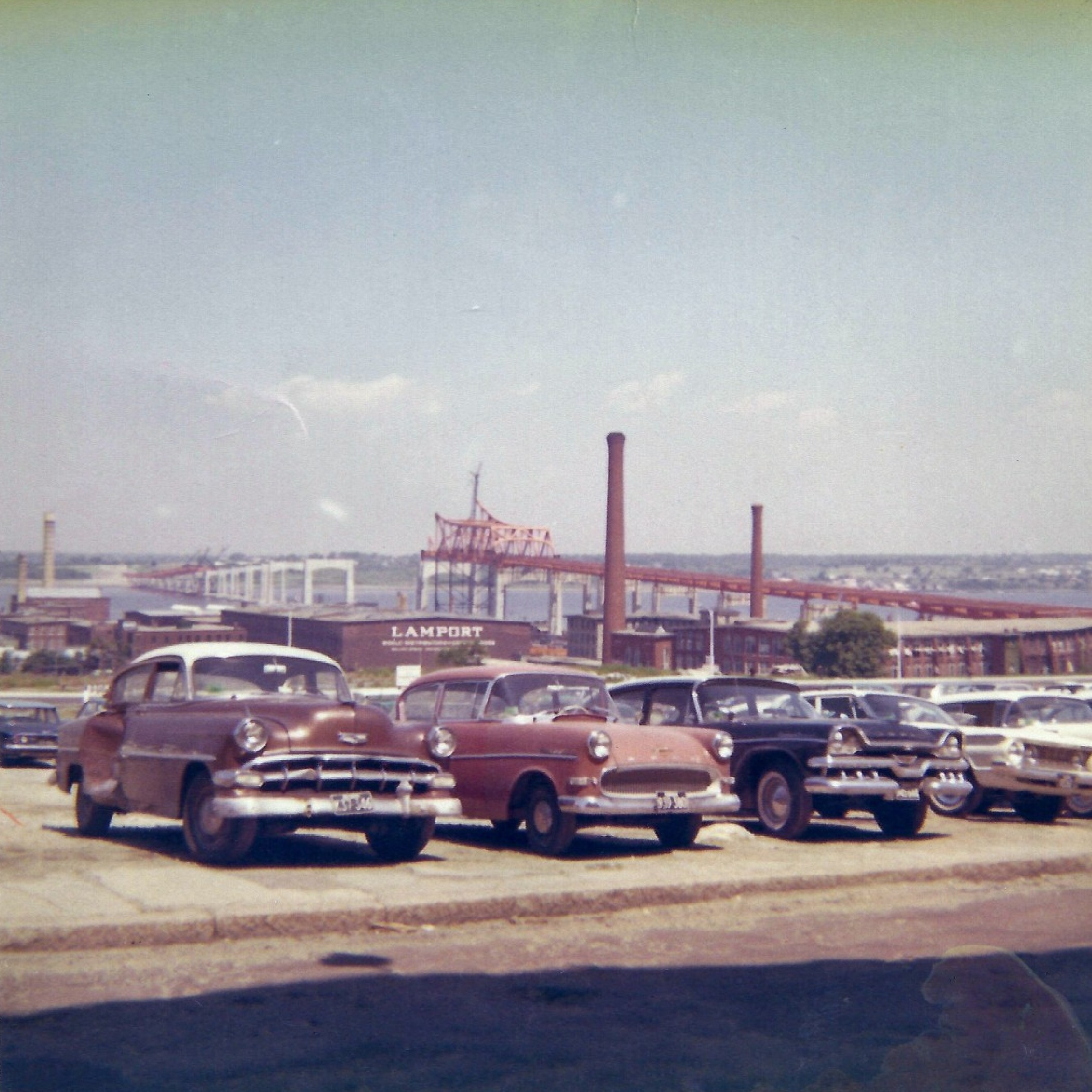
The Braga Bridge Under Construction

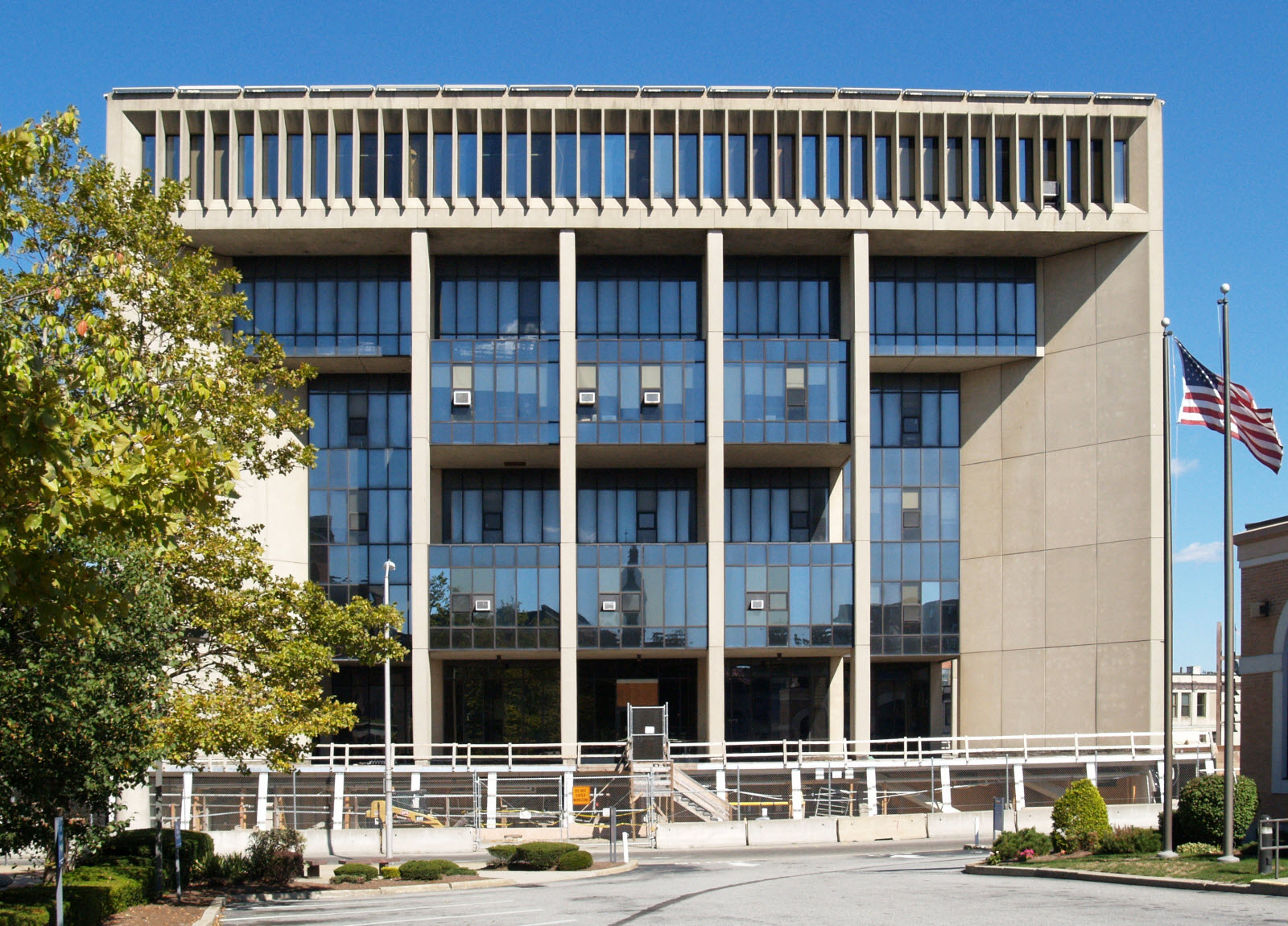
Fall River City Hall

In the 1960s the city's landscape was drastically transformed with the construction of the Braga Bridge and Interstate 195, which cut directly through the heart of the city. In the wake of the highway building boom, the city lost some pieces of its history. The Quequechan River was filled in and re-routed for much of its length. The historic falls, which had given the city its name, were diverted into underground culverts. A series of elevated steel viaducts were also constructed to access the new Braga Bridge. Many historic buildings were demolished, including the Old City Hall, the 150-year-old Troy Mills, the Second Granite Block (built after the 1928 fire), as well as several other 19th century brick-and-mortar buildings near Old City Hall.

Constructed directly over Interstate 195, where its predecessor was, the new city hall (officially known as "Fall River Government Center") was finally opened in 1976, after years of construction delays and quality control problems. Built in the Brutalist style so popular in the 1960s and 1970s, the new city hall drew complaints from city workers and residents almost immediately.

Also during the 1970s, several modern apartment high-rise towers were built throughout the city, many under the auspices of the Fall River Housing Authority. There were two built near Milliken Boulevard, two on Pleasant Street in Flint Village, another on South Main Street and one in the north end off Robeson Street. Today, these high-rises are known by a variety of names, and most serve as housing for the elderly.

In 1978, the city opened the new B.M.C. Durfee High School in the north end, replacing the historic Rock Street masterpiece that had become overcrowded and outdated for use as a high school. The new Durfee is currently one of the largest high schools in Massachusetts.

== Recent history ==
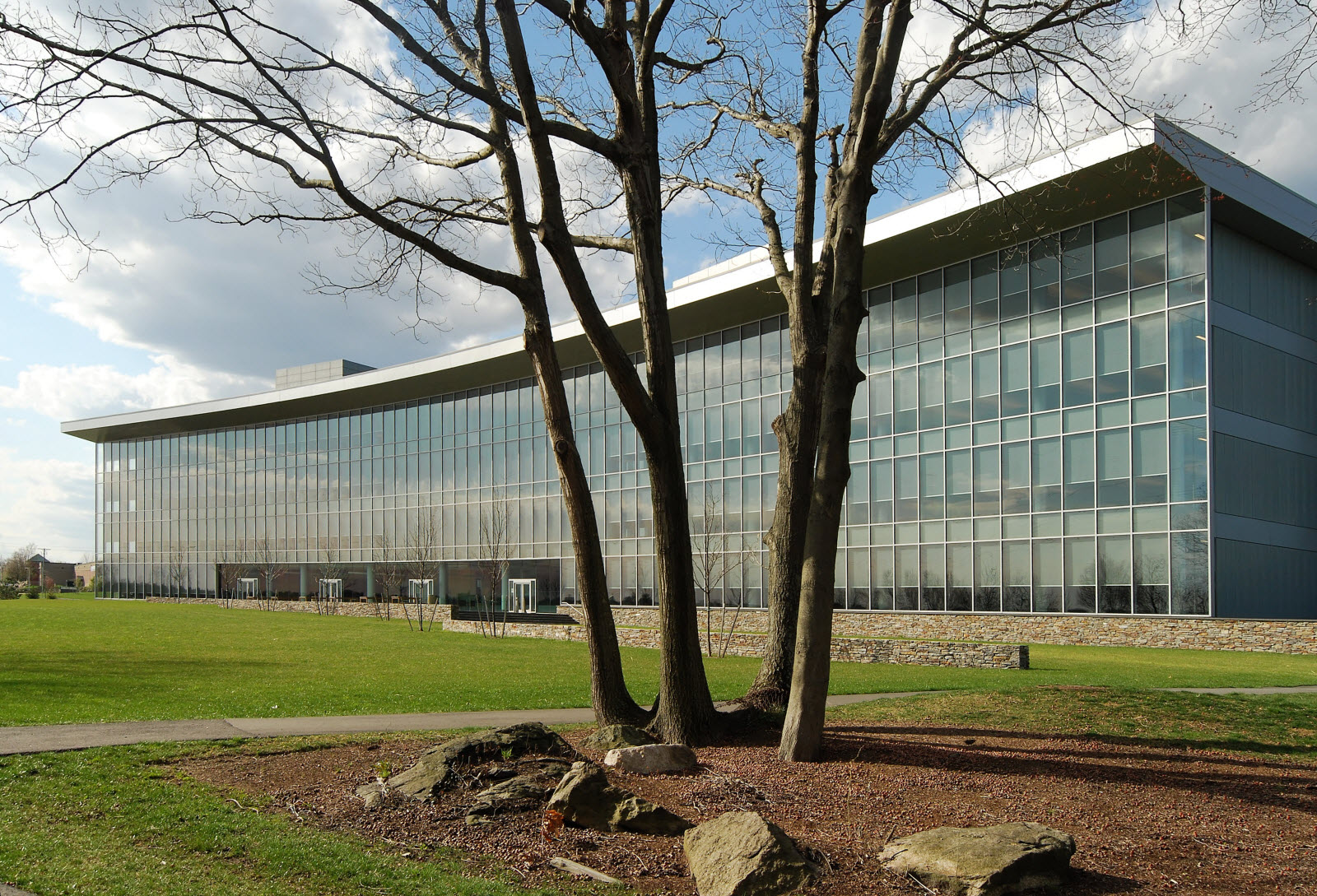
Meditech Building, opened in 2008 on the former site of Kerr Mills

In the 1980s the city of Fall River suffered three more huge, disastrous fires. Although nobody was killed in any of these events, the city lost three historically important structures.

On November 5, 1981, the 100-year-old Richard Borden Mill on Rodman Street caught fire in the afternoon and burned for many hours through the night. During the massive fire, the Fall River Fire Department poured many thousands of gallons of water on a Shell Gasoline station just next door to the mill at the corner of Plymouth Avenue, preventing a possible explosion that would have created much more damage.

Then, just a few months later, on May 11, 1982, while in the process of a major renovation project, hot sparks from a worker's torch ignited a fire near the roof of the Notre Dame de Lourdes Church in the city's Flint Village section. Fed by high winds and dry roof timbers, the fire spread quickly, soon engulfing the twin copper-clad spires of the church as well as several triple-decker apartment houses across Bedard Street. The raging inferno was so hot, there was nothing the fire department could do but watch and try to prevent other buildings from burning. The high winds made the job ever so difficult, and in the end, the church was a complete loss, along with dozens of neighboring buildings, destroying an entire city block between Bedard Street and Pleasant Street. A new church was built in the same location in 1986.

Finally, on January 12, 1987, the huge Kerr Mill Complex, also in the city's East End along South Watuppa Pond, was destroyed in a massive inferno that began in the historic 1899 Thread Mill on Eastern Avenue and spread along the entire complex. The mills had been occupied by many companies, and over 900 people suddenly found themselves without jobs. The Kerr Mill site was redeveloped in the late 1990s, and in 2001 the Advanced Technology & Manufacturing Center of UMass-Dartmouth opened its doors at this location. More recently, the Meditech building opened on the western side of the property, with a garage built on the site of the 1899 mill in front of the building.

=== Mayor Correia ===
In January 2016, Mayor Jasiel Correia took office as the youngest mayor in city history, at age 23. In 2018, Correia was arrested and charged with wire fraud and filing false tax returns. The City Council called on Correia to resign; he refused, and was put up for recall election in March 2019. On the same ballot as the recall election, voters were asked to choose among five people for the mayor's job. Thus, on the same ballot Correia simultaneously was recalled and won re-election. In 2019 Correia was charged by federal prosecutors with bribery and extortion in connection with distributing favors to marijuana vendors in exchange for cash bribes. Correia was defeated for re-election in November 2019 by Paul Coogan.

== See also ==
- American Printing Company (Fall River Iron Works)
- Oliver Chace
- Colonel Richard Borden
- Ephraim Kingsbury Avery
- Metacomet Mill
- List of mills in Fall River, Massachusetts
- National Register of Historic Places listings in Fall River, Massachusetts
- List of mayors of Fall River, Massachusetts
- List of selectmen of Fall River, Massachusetts
- Fall River Female Anti Slavery Society
- Lizzie Borden

== Primary sources ==
- Bentson, Ines (Dolly). Hello Dolly - Growing up in the late 1930s in Fall River, Massachusetts (2007), memoir of growing up in the city's Portuguese immigrant community. online
- Fall River Directory. Boston: Sampson, Davenport & Co. 1880.
- Fall River Directory. Boston: Sampson & Murdock Co. 1905.
- Fall River Directory. Boston: Sampson & Murdock Co. 1921.
