= Buffum (surname) =

Buffum is a surname. Notable people with the surname include:

- Arnold Buffum (1782–1859), Quaker abolitionist
- Arnold Buffum Chace (1845–1932), American businessman and academic administrator
- Charles Abel Buffum (1870–1936), American businessman and politician
- Dorothy Buffum Chandler (1901–1997), American cultural leader
- Edward Gould Buffum (1820–1867), American philanthropist, son of Arnold Buffum.
- Elizabeth Buffum Chace (1806–1899), American activist. She was the daughter of Arnold Buffum.
- James N. Buffum (1807–1887), American politician
- John Buffum (born 1943), American rally driver
- Lillie Buffum Chace Wyman (1847–1929), American social reformer
- Robert Buffum (1828–1871), American Union Army soldier
- Thomas Buffum (1776–1852), Justice of the Rhode Island Supreme Court
- William B. Buffum (1921–2012), American diplomat

== See also ==
- Buffum, an American automobile.
- Buffums, a former chain of department stores in California, owned by Charles A. Buffum and his brother Edwin E. Buffum.
