= Edward G. Chace =

American businessman

Edward Gould Chace (1882–1935) was an American businessman and an entrepreneur in textile manufacturing. Chace led the organization of the Fort Dummer Mills in Brattleboro, Vermont, a cotton mill, and he served as the founding manager. He also served as a vice president and the treasurer of Berkshire Fine Spinning Associates, a predecessor of Berkshire Hathaway.

== Early life and education ==
Chace was born to Arnold Buffum Chace and Eliza Greene Chace in Providence, Rhode Island on October 16, 1882. His father, Arnold Chace, served as the 11th chancellor of Brown University and studied Egyptology. Chace's grandmother, Elizabeth Buffum Chace, served as an activist in the women's rights and anti-slavery movements. His brother, Malcolm Greene Chace, won the National Intercollegiate Tennis Championship in three consecutive years; the International Tennis Hall of Fame inducted him in 1961. Chace was also a cousin of physicist Richard Chace Tolman and psychologist Edward Chace Tolman. Both were sons of Arnold Chace's sister.

Chace did his early studies at the University Grammar School, a private school in Providence. He then completed his high school education at Morristown School (now Morristown-Beard School) in Morristown, New Jersey in 1900. After studying at Yale University in New Haven, Connecticut, he earned his bachelor's degree from Williams College in Williamstown, Massachusetts in 1905. Chace then worked as a tax assessor in Lincoln, Rhode Island from 1906 to 1909.

== Textile work ==
After college, Chace began working at the Valley Falls Company, a family-run textile mill company in Valley Falls, Rhode Island. He served as an assistant treasurer of the mills from 1905 to 1909. Chace worked under his father, Arnold Chace, who served as the treasurer of Valley Falls Company. (Arnold Chace had previously served as the manager of Valley Falls Company.) Chace's grandfather, Oliver Chace, founded Valley Falls Company in 1839.

In 1910, Chace led efforts to build the Fort Dummer Mills in Brattleboro, Vermont. He directed efforts to attain funding to construct the mill, and promoted its prospective impact to the area. After the mills' founding, Chace served as the manager of the Fort Dummer Mills. In 1929, the Berkshire Cotton Manufacturing Company merged with Fort Dummer Mills, Valley Falls Company, Greylock Mills, and Coventry Company. Chace served as a vice president and the treasurer of the new company known as Berkshire Fine Spinning Associates. Berkshire Associates had its offices in Fall River, Massachusetts.

== Fuel and financial industry ==
Chace served as an assistant director of the Distribution Division of the United States Fuel Administration's Rhode Island state office. His brother, Malcolm Chace, headed the office. Established during World War I, the FFA managed conservation of U.S. energy resources under the Food and Fuel Control Act. It also established Daylight saving time. During his career, Chace also served as a director and president of Westminster Bank of Rhode Island.

== Family ==
Chace married Christine MacLeod Chace on October 17, 1906. They had four daughters: Christine Chace Wallace, Eliza Chace Collins, Jessie Chace Hogg, and Margaret Chace.
