= Chace (surname) =

Chace is a surname, and may refer to:

- Arnold Buffum Chace (1845–1932), American textile businessman and mathematician
- Burton W. Chace (1901–1972), American official, mayor of Long Beach, California
- Calum Chace (born 1959), English writer and speaker
- Charles A. Chace (1822–1900), American politician from Missouri
- Clyde Burgess Chace, builder of the Schindler House
- Edward G. Chace (1882–1935), American entrepreneur
- Elizabeth Buffum Chace (1806–1899), American Quaker reformer
- Fenner A. Chace Jr. (1908–2004), American carcinologist
- Howard L. Chace (1897–1982), American linguist
- Jonathan Chace (1829–1917), American politician from Rhode Island
- James Chace (1931–2004), American historian and foreign policy thinker
- Kiersten Dunbar Chace (born 1959), film producer, director, photographer
- Kimberly Chace (born 1956), American artistic gymnast
- Malcolm Greene Chace (1875–1955), American financier, tennis player and hockey coach
- Malcolm Greene Chace, Jr., (1904–1996) chairman of Berkshire Hathaway during the 1960s
- Malcolm Greene Chace III (1934–2011), board of directors of Berkshire Hathaway 1992-2007
- Marian Chace (1896–1970), American dance teacher, a founder of dance therapy
- Oliver Chace (1769–1852), American textile industrialist
- Rebecca Chace, American novelist, playwright, screenwriter and actor
- Taylor Chace (born 1986), American sledge hockey player
- William Chace (born 1938), American literary scholar

== See also ==
- Chase (surname)
- Chance (surname)
