= Fall River Manufactory =

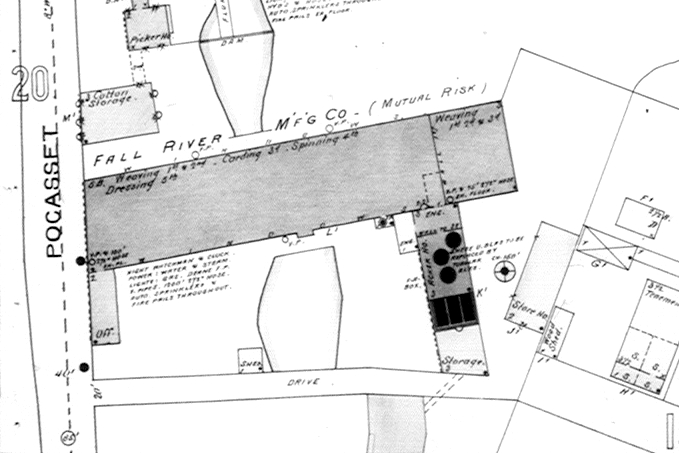
1893 map of Fall River Mfg. Co.

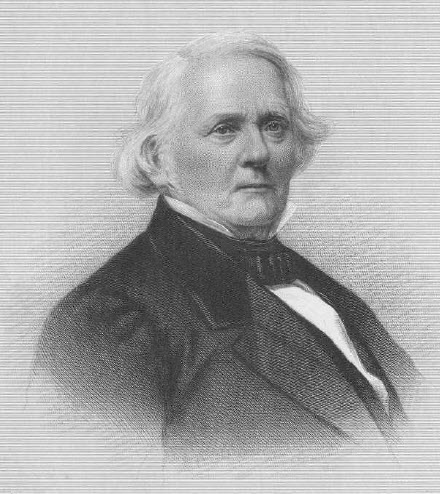
David Anthony, founder of the Fall River Manufactory

The Fall River Manufactory (later known as Fall River Manufacturing Company) was the first cotton mill to be constructed across the Quequechan River in Fall River, Massachusetts (then known as Troy), United States. It was also the first successful textile mill in the area. (Although an earlier mill had been established by Joseph Durfee in 1811 in nearby Tiverton, Rhode Island, it was never very successful.)

The company was established with $40,000 in capital in March 1813 by David Anthony, Dexter Wheeler, Abraham Bowen, and several associates. Much of the money was raised in nearby towns. In the same month of March 1813, the Troy Cotton & Woolen Manufactory was also founded at the high end of the falls along the Quequechan, about 1/4 mile to the east. The Troy opened for business in March 1814. By the 1820s, the successful operation of these two pioneering cotton mills would lead to the establishment of several others along a short stretch of the Quequechan River. By 1850, Fall River would rank as one of the leading textile centers in the United States.

== History ==
The impetus for establishing a new cotton mill on the Quequechan River at Troy was brought about largely by the ongoing War of 1812, which led to widespread shortages and increased prices of cotton goods in the United States. By this time, the textile industry was well established in nearby Rhode Island and in other parts of New England. David Anthony, a native of the nearby town of Somerset had gained experience in the cotton textile industry while working for Samuel Slater in Pawtucket. In April 1812, Anthony worked for a short time in the cotton mill of his cousin Dexter Wheeler, across the river in Rehoboth, Massachusetts (now part of Pawtucket). Dexter Wheeler was an experienced machine builder, who had established a small horse-powered yarn mill at Rehoboth in 1807.

The Fall River Manufactory's mill was completed in October 1813. Built directly over Quequechan River at the third falls above tidewater, it measured just 60 feet long by 40 feet wide, with three stories. The lower story was constructed from field stone acquired from nearby, while the upper two stories were finished in wood. It became known as the "yellow mill", and had capacity for about 1,500 spindles. Dexter Wheeler built much of the machinery for the new mill, with some of it being transferred from his Rehoboth factory. Dexter Wheeler served as the company's first president, from 1813 to 1824. David Anthony served as the first treasurer of the company.

The Fall River and Troy mills had barely begun operation when the Treaty of Ghent was signed on December 24, 1814, ending the War of 1812. During the period that followed, many of the recently established textile mills in New England struggled or failed due to a sharp drop in demand and prices for their goods, brought on by resumed shipments of cheaper products from Great Britain.

Nevertheless, the industrious Yankee owners of the Fall River Manufactory persevered, and sought to improve their business with new technologies. In 1814, the mill acquired a Blair picking machine, which had just been introduced in the United States. This machine was used to clean and process the raw cotton prior to spinning, a process that until then had been done by hand at considerable time and expense. The new device resulted in greatly increased production and about a 75 percent drop in the cost in the picking process.

Initially, the company produced only cotton yarn, which was sent out to local farm women for weaving into cloth. However, in 1817, Wheeler built the first power loom to operate in Fall River. Although the first looms were rather clumsy and imperfect in their operation, they were gradually improved over time. By 1820, the mill contained 30 looms operated by 15 weavers.

The Fall River Manufactory was incorporated in 1820 with $150,000. In 1827, the company built the Nankeen Mill, which was leased to Azariah and Jarvis Shove for the manufacture of nankeen cloth.

In 1839, both the original 1813 "Yellow Mill" and the 1827 Nankeen Mill were demolished for the construction of a new, larger factory, which became known as the "White Mill". By 1850, the Fall River Manufactory contained 9,240 spindles and 209 looms, employing about 143 people. It consumed about 828 bales of cotton per year, to produce 1,742,400 yards of print cloth.

The second mill burned on May 14, 1868, and was replaced by a third mill, 275 feet long by 74 feet wide with 5 stories. The 1869 mill contained 640 looms and 27,080 spindles. This mill was powered by two turbines of 140 horsepower each. Supplemental power was also provide by a 300-horsepower Corliss engine, fed by steam from two upright boilers. This mill was later extended in 1891, to increase spinning capacity to 41,000 spindles. By 1893, the company had acquired the adjacent Quequechan Mills (originally built as Robeson Print Works).

The Fall River Manufacturing Company property was acquired in 1905 by the Pocasset Manufacturing Company, and became known as that company's Mill No. 5. The Quequechan Mills property was acquired by William J. Dunn and leased to several small businesses. After the closing and subsequent 1928 fire of the Pocasset Mills, the property of the Fall River Manufacturing Company was occupied by various small businesses until the early 1960s, when the property was taken by the Commonwealth of Massachusetts for construction of Interstate 195. The 1869 mill was scheduled to be demolished with it was destroyed by fire on August 15, 1961. The location now contains part of the interchange between I-195 and the Route 79 viaduct.

== See also ==
- American Printing Company
- List of mills in Fall River, Massachusetts
- Metacomet Mill
