= Lillie Buffum Chace Wyman =

Elizabeth "Lillie" Buffum Chace Wyman (December 10, 1847 – January 10, 1929) was an American social reformer and an author best known for her short stories and essays about problems like the mistreatment of factory workers. She also wrote poems and an interpretation of Shakespeare's Hamlet from Queen Gertrude's point of view.

== Family and education ==
She was born Elizabeth "Lillie" Buffum Chace in Valley Falls, Rhode Island, eighth of ten children of Elizabeth Buffum Chace, a social reformer active in the anti-slavery, women's suffrage, and prison reform movements. Her father, Samuel Buffington Chace, was the son of Oliver Chace, a textile manufacturer who founded the Valley Falls Company, the original antecedent of Berkshire Hathaway. Her Quaker parents made their house a station on the Underground Railroad helping runaway slaves escape to Canada. Her brother Arnold became a noted mathematician. During her youth she became lifelong friends with fellow abolitionists and women's rights campaigners Fanny Garrison Villard and Anna Dickinson.

She attended a girls' school in Massachusetts run by Diocletian Lewis in order to study with the abolitionist Theodore Dwight Weld. Afterwards she served as her mother's secretary for some years, and she traveled to Europe in 1872 for a year of further studies.

In 1878, she married John C. Wyman of Massachusetts, a former captain in the Union Army who had served on the staff of General Daniel McCallum. They had one son, Arthur Crawford Wyman (b. 1879).

== Writing and social activism ==
Drawing in part on knowledge gained from growing up in a textile-manufacturing family, Wyman made a study of the conditions of factory workers. This research provided the background for an 1877 short story in the Atlantic Monthly detailing the experiences of a child who is born in a family of factory workers and ends up in a reform school. "The Child of the State" drew attention to the problems at the real reform school that had served as the model for her story. She went on to publish several studies of factory life, four of which appeared in the Atlantic Monthly, while others came out in the Christian Union and the Chautauquan.

In 1886, her collected stories were published in a volume entitled Poverty Grass. In 1913, she published American Chivalry, a collection of essays about social reformers like Wendell Phillips, Sojourner Truth, and Parker Pillsbury, several of which included personal reminiscences. In 1914, she published a two-volume biography of her mother that she had co-authored with her son: Elizabeth Buffum Chace: Her Life and Its Environment.

Wyman's most unusual book is Gertrude of Denmark: An Interpretive Romance (1924), a study of Prince Hamlet's mother that provides Queen Gertrude's perspectives on her own life and the events of the play. Here Wyman "interrogates the nineteenth-century cult of the self-sacrificing mother", critiquing the influence it had on interpretations of the play by both male critics and actresses playing Gertrude.

Wyman and her husband spent two winters in southern Georgia, where they were instrumental in establishing a free library for Black citizens of that state. They also worked on developing industrial education programs for Black citizens.

== Books ==
- Poverty Grass (1886)
- American Chivalry (1913)
- Published Interludes and Other Verses (1913)
- Elizabeth Buffum Chace: Her Life and Its Environment (1914; with Arthur Crawford Wyman)
- Gertrude of Denmark: An Interpretive Romance (1924)
