= American Printing Company =

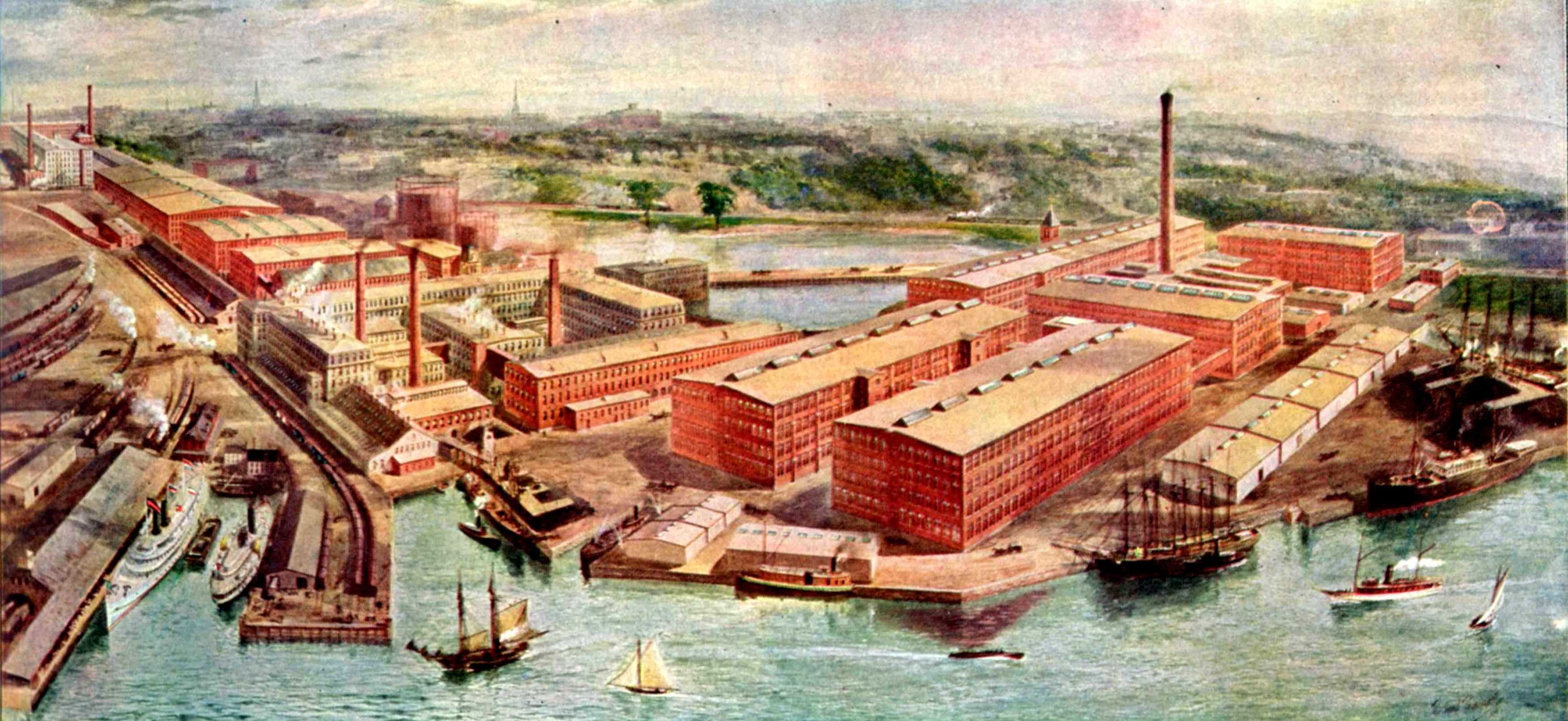
Overview of the American Printing Company, Fall River, Massachusetts, about 1910. The Fall River Line and Old Colony Railroad are on the left.

The American Printing Company, located in Fall River, Massachusetts, grew to become the largest producer of printed cotton cloth in the United States by the early 20th Century. The company was an offshoot of the Fall River Iron Works, established in 1821 by Colonel Richard Borden and Major Bradford Durfee. The American Print Works was established in 1835 by Holder Borden. At its peak during World War I, it employed several thousand workers.

== Fall River Iron Works ==
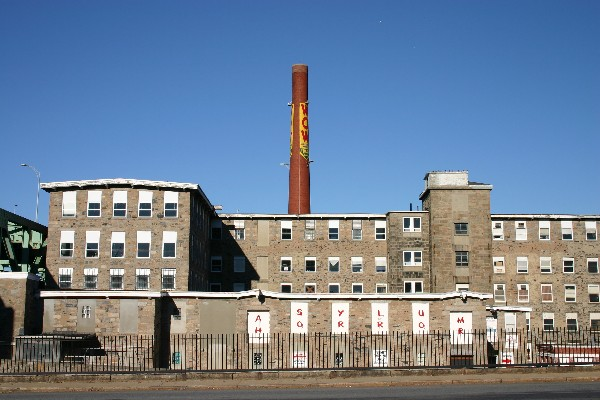
Metacomet Mill, built 1847

The early development of the textile industry in Fall River, Massachusetts, grew out of the developments made in nearby Rhode Island beginning with Samuel Slater at Pawtucket in 1793. The first textile mill in Fall River was built in 1811. Several more would follow between 1813 and 1821, along the "falling" Quequechan River for which the city was named.

In 1821, Col. Richard Borden established the Fall River Iron Works, along with Maj. Bradford Durfee at the lower part of the Quequechan River. Bradford Durfee was a shipwright, and Richard Borden was the owner of a grist mill. After an uncertain start, in which some early investors pulled out, the Fall River Iron Works was incorporated in 1825, with $200,000 in capital. The Iron Works began producing nails, bar stock, and other items such as bands for casks in the nearby New Bedford whaling industry. They soon gained a reputation for producing nails of high quality, and business flourished.

By 1833, Fall River had 13 cotton mills, employing 1,200 people, with 31,000 total spindles (a common measure of total spinning capacity) and 1,050 looms. The Iron Works would continue to play an important role in the early development of the textile industry in Fall River.

By 1840, the Iron Works employed about 250 people and produced over 3.8 million pounds of nails, as well as 950 tons of iron hoops and 400 tons of castings. By 1845, the company was valued at $960,000. In 1827, Col. Borden began regular steamship service to Providence, Rhode Island.

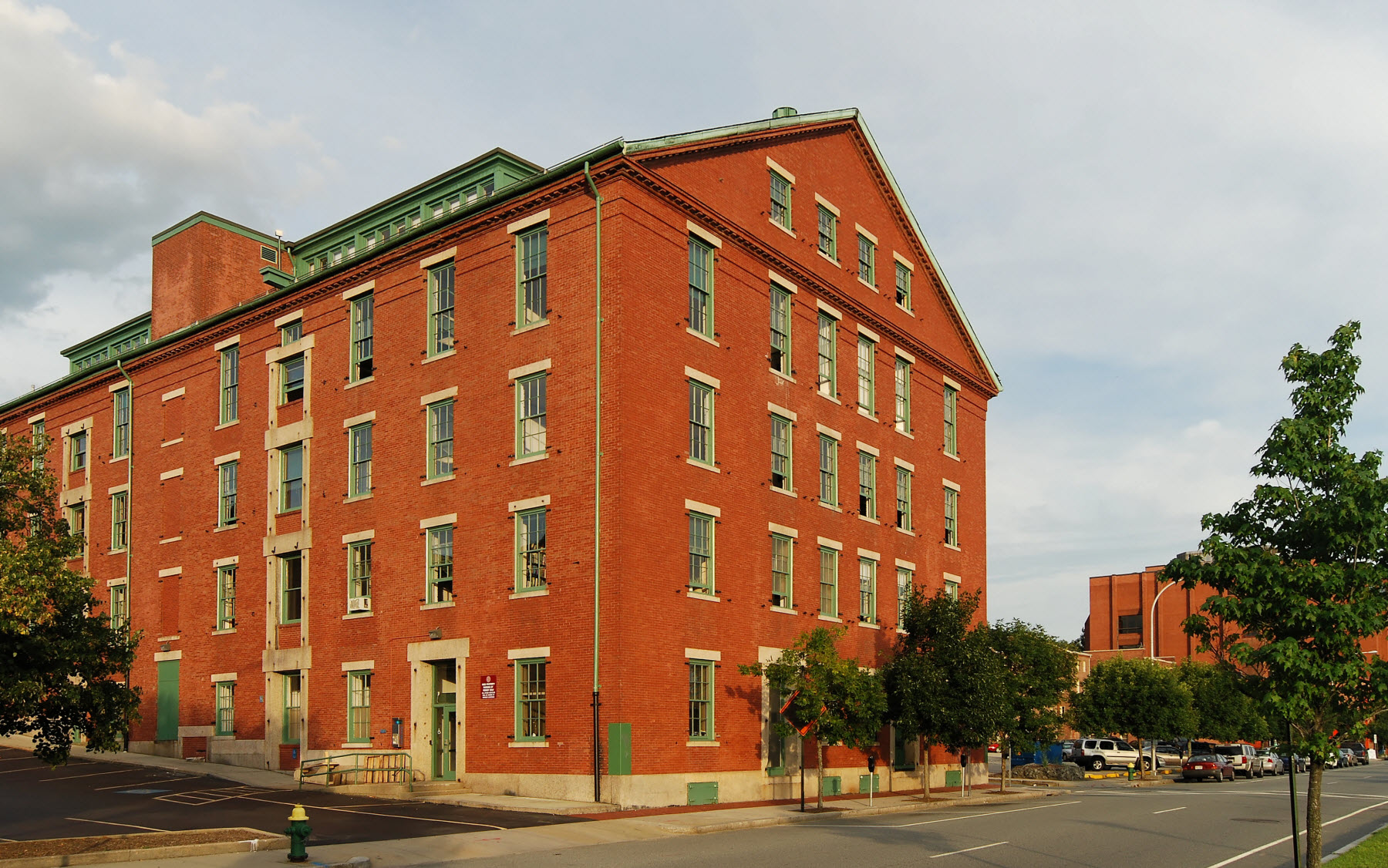
F.R. Iron Works Providence, R.I.

Always looking to diversify his holdings, Richard Borden constructed the Metacomet Mill in 1847, which today is the oldest remaining textile mill in the city, located on Anawan Street. The Iron Works also established the Fall River Gas Company in 1847, and manufactured gas from coal.

In 1848, the Fall River Iron Works constructed an office and warehouse building along the waterfront in Providence, Rhode Island and retained the location until 1881. This building is still standing, and is now occupied by the Rhode Island School of Design. Providence Site Info

By 1876, the Iron Works occupied two sites, consisting of a rolling mill, a nail mill and a foundry. It had an average annual production of 7,000 tons.

== American Print Works ==
In 1824, Andrew Robeson, arrived from New Bedford and established the first Print Works in the city, a segment of the industry that Fall River would in later years come to dominate.

The American Print Works was established in 1835 by Holder Borden, nephew of Colonel Richard. Located along the shore of Mount Hope Bay, its location would prove ideal as ocean-going ships were able to dock at the company's doorstep. In the 1840s, the railroad would be extended to the Print Works site, adjacent to the steamship pier with regular service to Providence and New York City. Both the steamships and the railroad were controlled by Colonel Richard Borden, and later his sons and nephews.

In 1853, the nearby Globe Print Works was acquired by Richard Borden, his brother Jefferson and Oliver Chace. It was renamed the Bay State Print Works, and was later reorganized.

For three generations, the Borden family dynasty would have control or business interests in the city's banks, the gas company, steamboats, railroads and mines. (Lizzie Borden, the famed alleged axe-murderer in 1892 was the great-granddaughter of an uncle of Colonel Richard Borden).

== Expansion ==
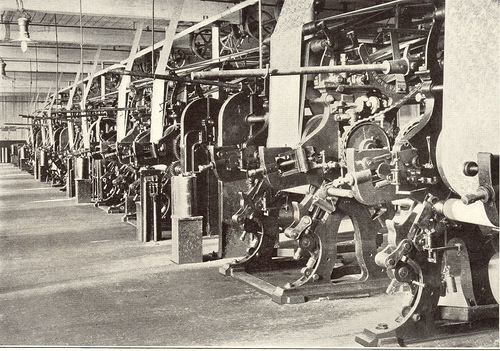
Printing Room, American Print Works, about 1910

Fall River profited well from the American Civil War and was in a fine position to take advantage of the prosperity that followed. By 1868, it had surpassed Lowell as the leading textile city in the United States with over 500,000 total spindles. The American Print Works was set to open a new factory in 1867, when a disastrous fire occurred. It was a major setback for the company, as the final arrangements for insurance were in the process of being completed when the fire happened. However, the American Print Works was soon rebuilt in 1868, bigger and better than it was before.

A few years later during 1871 and 1872, a most dramatic expansion occurred within the City of Fall River, when 15 new corporations were founded, building 22 new mills throughout the city, while some of the older mills expanded. The city's population increased by an astounding 20,000 people during these two years, while overall mill capacity double to more than 1,000,000 spindles. The main product of these mills was print cloth, the vast majority of which, passed through the American Print Works.

By 1876, the city had 1/6 of all New England cotton capacity, and one-half of all print cloth production. "King Cotton" had definitely arrived. The "Spindle City" as it became known, was second in the world to only Manchester, England.

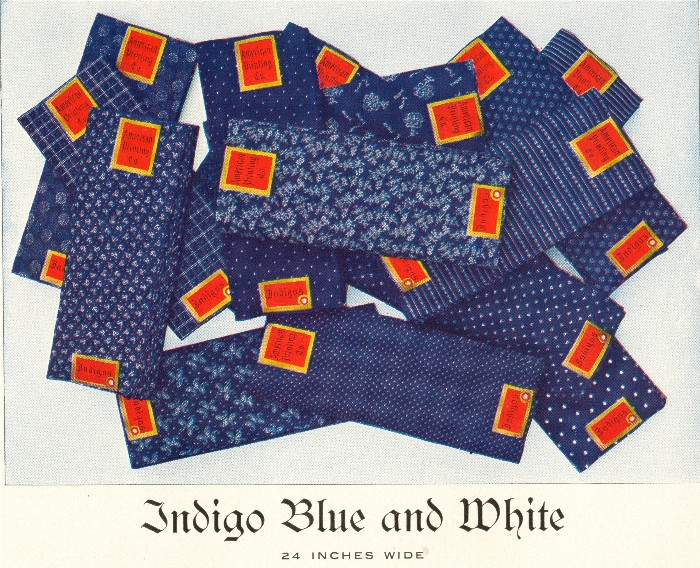
Indigo Blue & White printed cloth, American Printing Company, from a company catalog, about 1910

However, the 1870s would be a trying time for the textile industry, beginning with the Panic of 1873. The American Print Works failed in 1879, a result of the uninsured losses suffered in the 1867 fire, and was reorganized as the American Printing Company 1880.

At its peak in 1876, the Iron Works employed 600 men. However, just a few years later in 1880, the Iron Works property was divided among shareholders and production of iron ceased soon after, as a result of increased competition from other companies closer to the mines.

In 1887, M.C.D. Borden, son of Col. Richard gain control of the company's stock, and tore down the old buildings of the iron works, and began the construction of several huge new cloth-producing mills, adjacent to the American Printing Company. These new mills would be known as the "Iron Works Division" of the APC.

Three huge warehouses were also built along the lower portion of Anawan Street, to store the many copper printing rollers required for the production of print cloth, as well as to store customer's orders until they needed them. Mill Number 7 was built in 1905 further up on Anawan Street, and still stands today. The Narrows Center for the Arts occupies one of the former warehouse buildings.

In 1917, the American Printing Company was capitalized at $2,000,000. The Fall River Iron Works, the cloth-producing division of the company and had a huge capacity of 485,288 ring spindles and 12,702 looms. The print works had the capacity to print 125,000 pieces per week.

== Decline ==
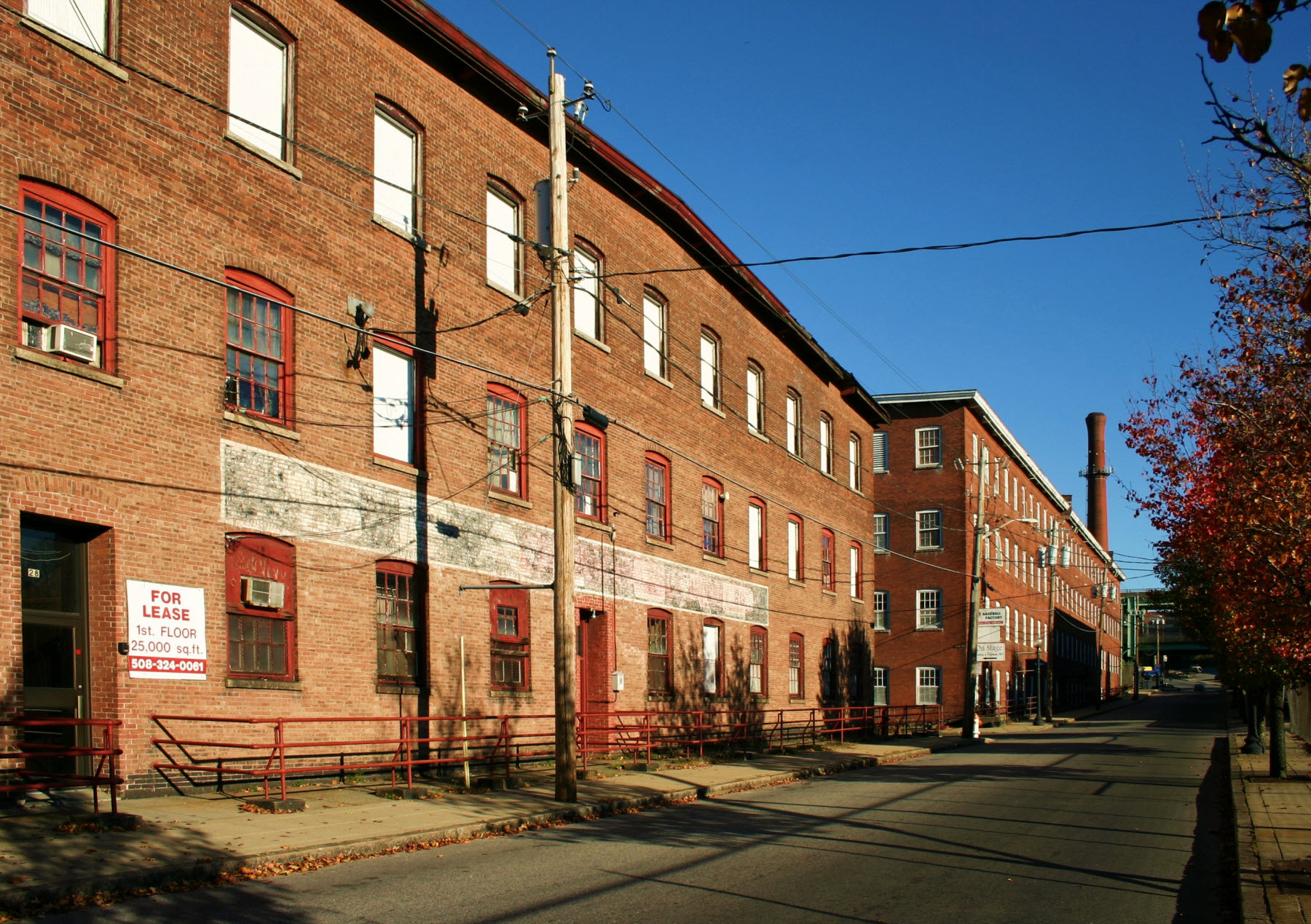
APC Warehouses, Anawan Street, Fall River

The cotton mills of Fall River had built their business largely on only one product: print cloth. About 1910, when APC was the city's largest employer, it employed 6,000 people and was the largest printer of cotton cloth in the world. Dozens of other city mills solely produced print cloth to be printed at the APC. The city's industry had all its eggs in one, very large basket.

But the Northern mills faced serious competition from their Southern counterparts, which had lower labor and transportation costs, and which had invested in new machinery and other equipment. Many northern mills added additional capacity, in a futile attempt to maintain their advantage over the South.

World War I provided a much-needed boost in demand for textiles, benefiting most of the mills in New England. But the economy slowed after the war, and as production outpaced demand, the price for print cloth dropped sharply. In 1923, Fall River faced the first wave of mill closures.

In 1924, following the example of some other large northern mills, the American Printing Company built a new plant at Kingsport, Tennessee, and began moving much of its production there. Thousands of Fall River jobs were suddenly lost. A decade later, APC closed its Fall River mills.

In 1937, the huge factory complex on Water Street was acquired by the Firestone Tire & Rubber Company, which soon employed 2,600 people there. On October 11–12, 1941, just eight weeks before the attack on Pearl Harbor, a fire broke out in the print works' old 1860s mill. Some 15,850 tons (31,700,000 pounds (14,400,000 kg)) of rubber was lost in the blaze, valued at about $7 million—a setback to the U.S. war effort noted by Commerce Secretary Jesse H. Jones, .

In March 1973, another fire destroyed the former Iron Works Division mills. These mills were set to be occupied by the Providence Pile Company. However, the sprinklers had been turned off during the winter because there was no heat in the buildings.

Today, the site is occupied by Borden & Remington Chemical Company, a company with its roots in the 19th-century textile industry. Several of the late 19th-century buildings still remain.

In October 2008, Borden & Remington began the demolition of Mill No. 3, which had been vacant and was deemed to be in poor condition. Mill No. 1 was demolished in May 2011. Much of the old-growth longleaf pine timbers used in the buildings were salvaged and have been recycled into flooring and millwork products.

== See also ==
- Borden Mines Superintendent's House
- Fall River Line
- History of Fall River, Massachusetts
- List of mills in Fall River, Massachusetts
- Old Colony Railroad
