= Fall River Government Center =

Government office in United States

Coordinates: 41°42′07.70″N 71°09′20.52″W

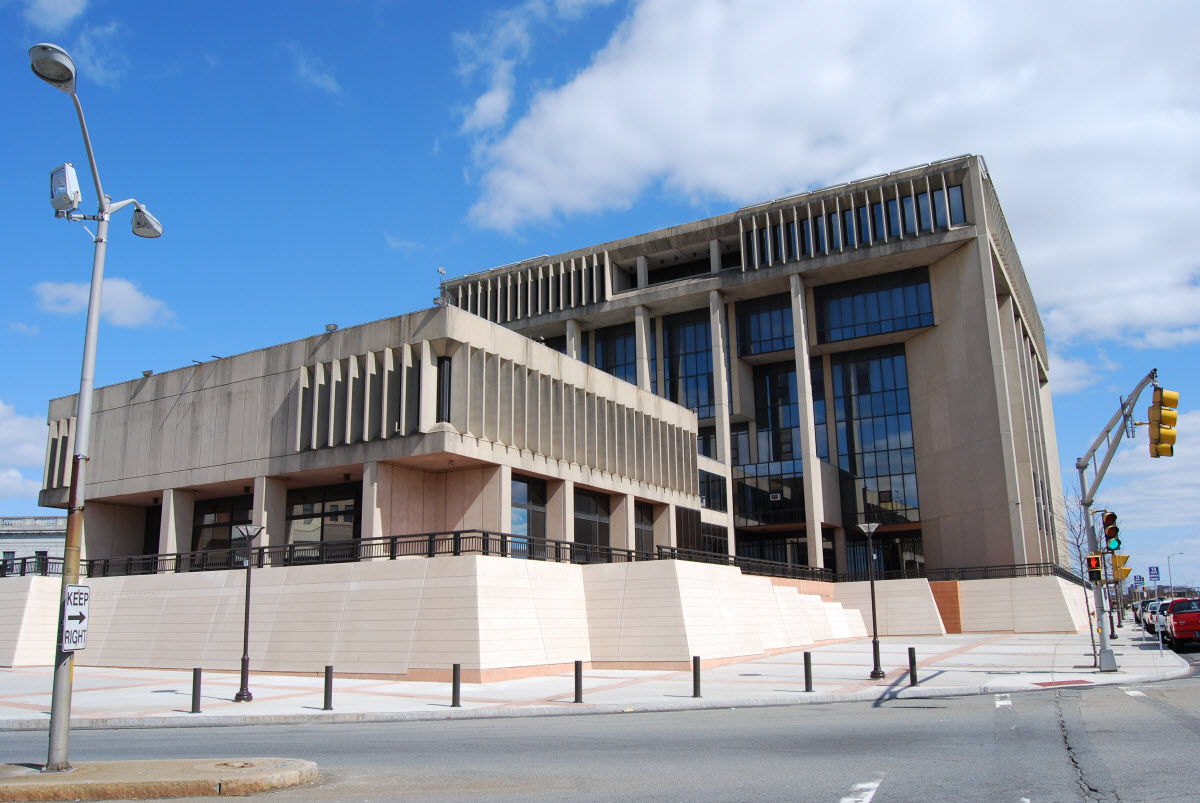
- View from South Main Street
- Completed: 1976
- Location: One Government Center
- Owner: City of Fall River
- Architectural Style: Brutalist
- Architect: Continental Engineering (RI)
- Builder: Dimeo Construction (RI)

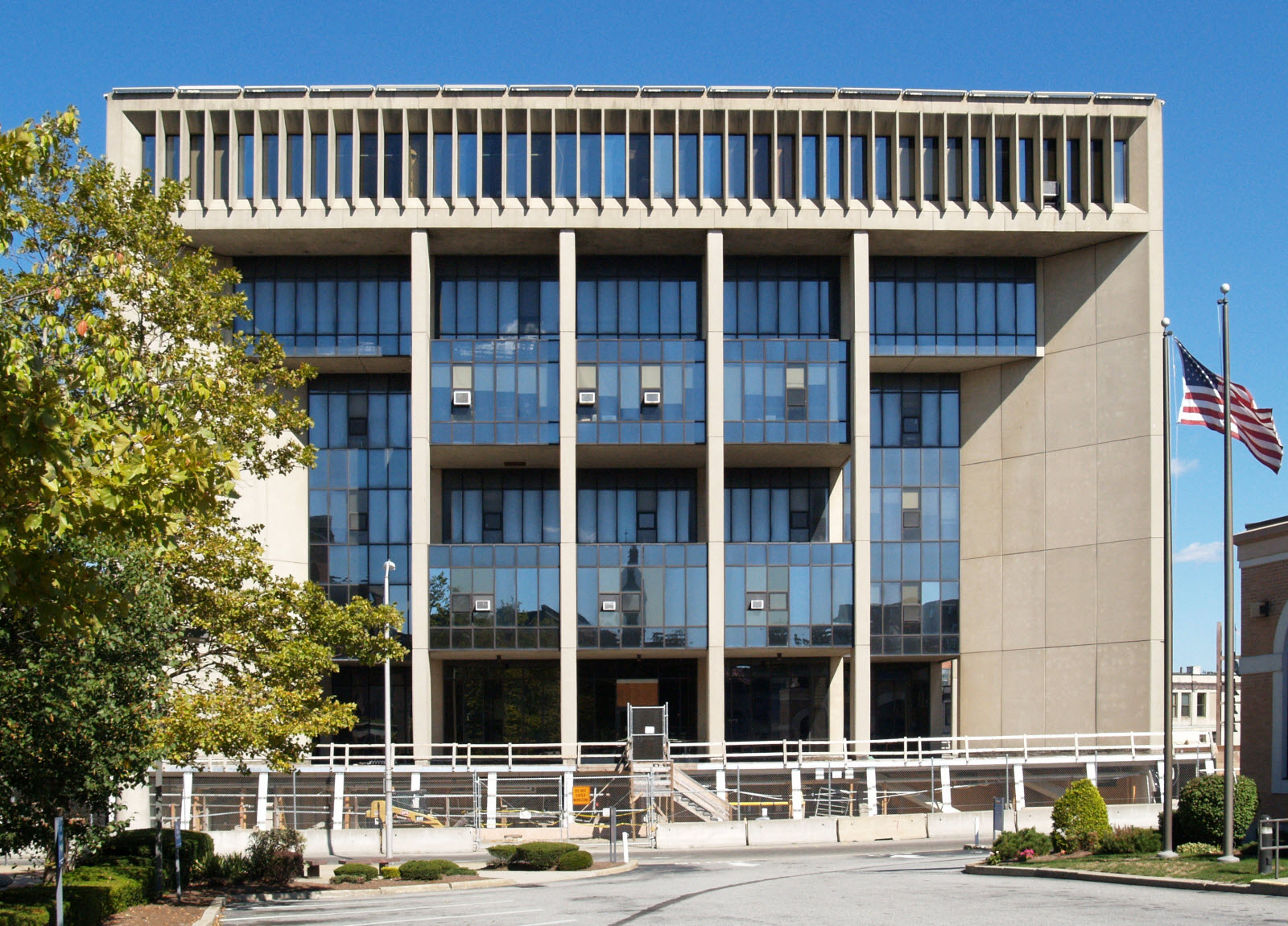
South facade

Fall River Government Center (also known as "City Hall") is the location of the municipal government offices in the city of Fall River, Massachusetts, United States. Located at One Government Center, and constructed directly over Interstate 195, it was the first public building built over a Federal interstate highway. It replaced the city's historic 19th century city hall which had been demolished in the early 1960s as part of the construction of Interstate 195, which cuts through the center of the city's downtown area. Delayed and plagued by problems during construction, the new city hall opened in 1976. In 2008, the building and site underwent a multimillion-dollar exterior renovation.

== Location ==
The current Fall River Government Center is located at the historic "crossroads" of the city, at the intersection of Central Street (Bedford Street) and Main Street. Fall River's first town hall was destroyed in the first great downtown fire of 1843, which destroyed over 200 buildings in the center of town.

== Old city hall ==
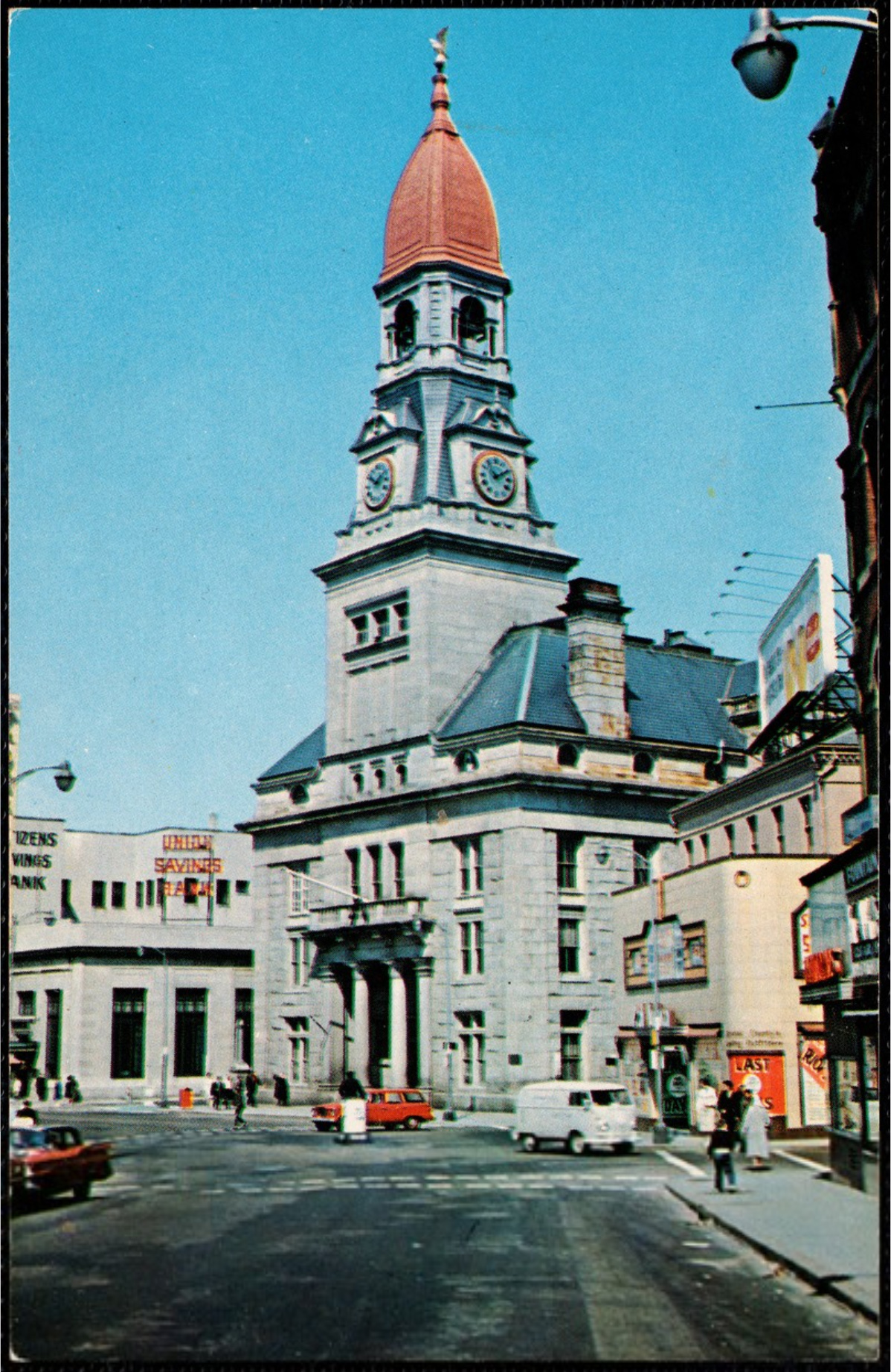
Old City Hall

The city's historic 19th century city hall was demolished in 1962 for construction of Interstate 195, which cut through the heart of downtown Fall River. It was a time of so-called "urban renewal" in the city after the tough years since the collapse of the city's textile industry in the 1920s and 1930s. Several other 19th and early 20th century buildings were also demolished as part of the new highway construction. The old city hall, which had survived two fires, was constructed next to the Quequechan River, the source of power for the early textile mills. As part of the highway project, the river was diverted into an underground culvert which parallels the highway, along the south side of the current city hall. Two granite columns from the front of the old city hall are located across from the current building, along Sullivan Drive, next to the Academy Building. The eagle which topped the spire of the old city hall is currently located in the foyer of the new building.

== Current building ==
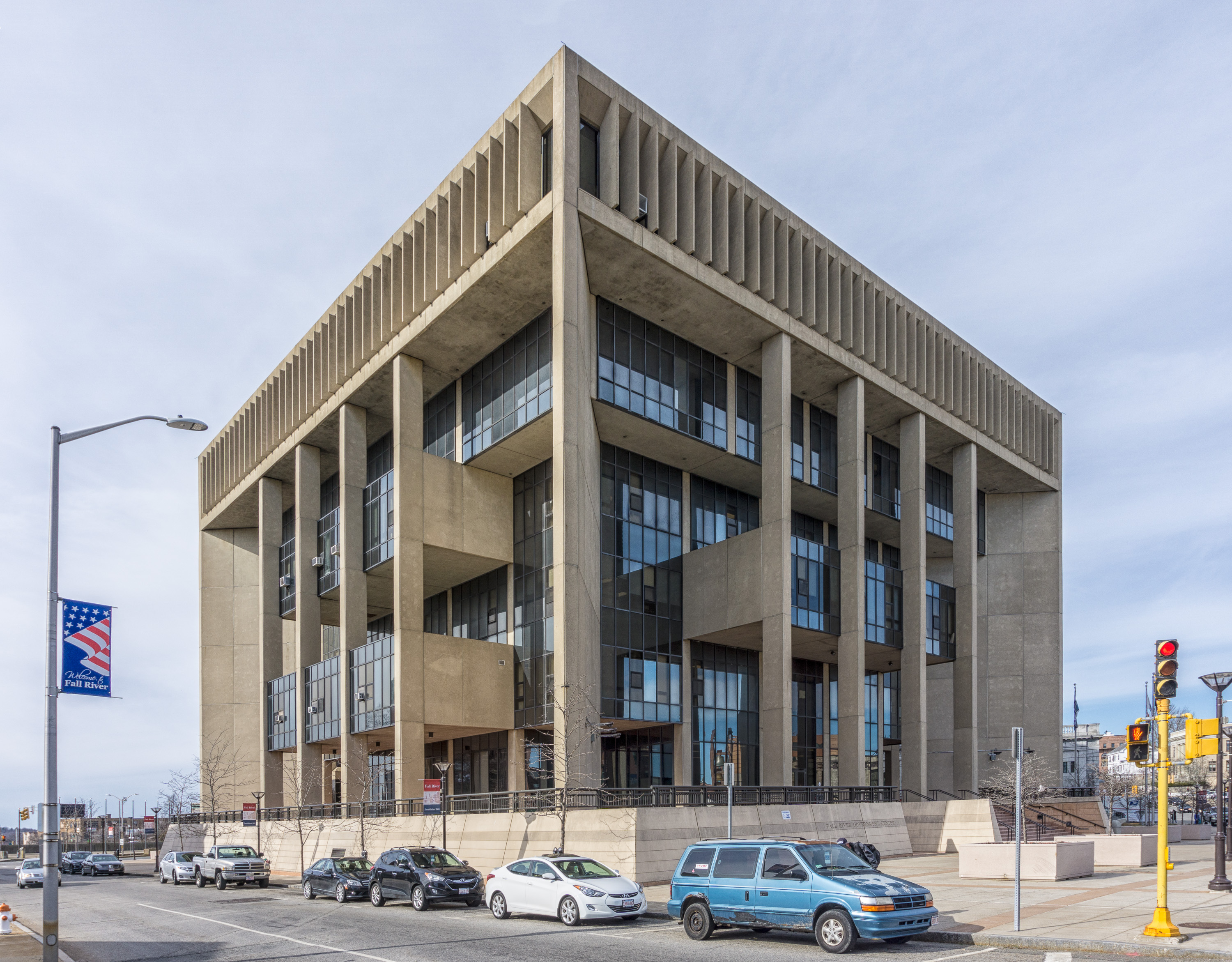
Government Center

The new Government Center (city hall), constructed of reinforced concrete and glass, in the popular Brutalist style of the 1960s and 1970s opened in 1976, after years of construction delays and quality control problems. The main buildings occupies a space further east than the original city hall, which was closer to South Main Street. A wing of the current building, which contains the city council chambers is located at the west end of the site, closer to South Main Street. A plaza was created north of the new city hall, between the adjacent United States Post Office. The original scheme for the new city hall included a parking garage, that was later eliminated from the design.

In June 1976, during the transition to the new building, both the old and new city hall buildings were burglarized, and several pieces of furniture and light fixtures were stolen. Then mayor Wilfred Driscoll hypothesized at the time that the items were stolen because of nostalgia for the historic building.

The main building is a concrete cube, approximately 144 feet (44 m) square, with a smaller glass-enclosed cube forming the middle floors. The building is set atop an elevated "basement" containing mechanical and storage areas constructed atop the steel platform which spans the highway. The platform also includes South Main Street to the west and Second Street to the east, creating a 900-foot (274 m) long tunnel.

== 1999 tunnel incident ==
In March 1999, several concrete slabs, which formed the ceiling of the tunnel beneath Government Center, fell onto the westbound lanes of Interstate 195. Although six vehicles crashed, including a minivan which overturned, nobody was killed in the accident. It was later determined that the support brackets which held the concrete slabs had corroded; as a result, state highway officials ordered the immediate removal of all of the concrete ceiling panels beneath Government Center.

With the slabs removed, the underside of Government Center became vulnerable to fire in the event of an accident within the tunnel. State and local officials therefore decided that all trucks carrying hazardous cargo, such as gasoline or oil, would not be allowed to pass along the interstate beneath the building. For several years, these vehicles were detoured through the city streets around Government Center. In May 2008, with the replacement of the concrete panels complete, this restriction was removed.

== See also ==
- Fall River, Massachusetts
- History of Fall River, Massachusetts
- Interstate 195
- List of structures built on top of freeways
