= Fall River Female Anti-Slavery Society =

American abolitionist organization

The Fall River Female Anti-Slavery Society was an abolitionist group in Fall River, Massachusetts, formed in 1835. It was the second female anti-slavery society in the city. One of its founding members was Elizabeth Buffum Chace (1806–1899).

== Origins ==
The association formed after a controversy over interracial membership divided its predecessor, the "Fall River Anti Slavery Sewing Society." Three free black women had been attending meetings and applied to join the Fall River Anti Slavery Sewing Society as real members. Some of the existing members, who were all white women, opposed the black women's inclusion. Elizabeth Buffum Chace, who supported the black women's petition to join, described the opposition as being preoccupied with custom and decorum: "they were willing to help and encourage them [the black women] in every way, but they did not think it was at all proper to invite them to join the society."

Elizabeth Buffum Chace, along with her sisters, allowed the black women to become members. Those who opposed the black women's admission left the society, and the group renamed itself, replacing the word "Sewing" in its name with the word "Female." While the original society was focused on abolition of slavery, Chace and her sisters were interested in the ending of all racist practices, even outside of slavery.

The newly named Fall River Female Anti-Slavery Society would run parallel to the Fall River Anti-Slavery Society. By 1838, the Female Anti-Slavery Society would have just twenty less members than its male counterpart:106 to 112. While these groups did hold core differences (such as the value of female involvement) they would often collaborate in order to facilitate larger conversations. In 1838, the groups would come together for their annual convention in the Fall River Baptist Meeting House.

== Activities and the Antislavery Fair ==
The Fall River Female Anti-Slavery Society held a regular fundraising fair to sell sewn and embroidered things with anti-slavery mottoes on them. This Anti-Slavery Fair was a place where the members could sell the things they made within Fall River, or in Boston. Another way they would fund raise was to go around Fall River and ask other women to donate money to the society, so they were able to promote more anti-slavery texts.

The group would read anti-slavery texts and discuss them together, as they sewed and embroidered; these were more acceptable female activities than fundraising. But there is also evidence of them creating a petition to Congress, as well as appealing to the other women of Fall River in their titles of wives, mothers, and daughters to learn about the truth of what was happening in the South, especially to enslaved women.

== Connections to other abolitionist groups ==
There is a published account of a delegate from the Fall River Female Anti-Slavery Society attending the Anti-Slavery Convention of American Women in May 1838, where a number of delegates from different female anti-slavery societies and groups came together in Pennsylvania to discuss the rights of African American women. The delegates wrote on the subject of social activism and the abolishment of slavery. Sarah G. Buffman, the Fall River delegate, served as one of the four secretaries for the convention, and in that role, she signed all three statements.

Another delegate from Fall River, Laura Lovell, reported about various people speaking at the convention, including a free African American man telling his story, and poetry being read. The Fall River society also created connections with female anti-slavery societies across New England including the New Bedford Female Anti-Slavery Society, and the Boston Female Anti-Slavery Society, for example through letters between Elizabeth Buffum Chace and Maria Weston Chapman, the head of the Boston society.
