= Edward Gould Buffum =

Edward Gould Buffum (1820–1867) was born in Rhode Island to Arnold Buffum, a well-known philanthropist in New England. His journalism career began with his work for the New York Herald. However, when the Mexican–American War began in 1846, Buffum was forced to leave his post and move to California with his regiment. He arrived in San Francisco Bay as the lieutenant of the 1st Regiment of New York Volunteers. After his discharge from the army in 1848, he decided to remain in California and try his hand at panning gold. These specific experiences were recorded in his book Six Months in the Gold Mine, published in 1850. He continued his journalism career in the West, becoming editor-in-chief of the Alta California newspaper, one of the first newspapers in California. He was very well respected in his community and was elected to the California State Assembly, serving in the session of 1855. When he returned to New England, he became a special correspondent for the Herald. On this job, he traveled to Paris, where he died on October 24, 1867, at the age of 41.
