= Oliver Chace's Thread Mill =

- U.S. National Register of Historic Places
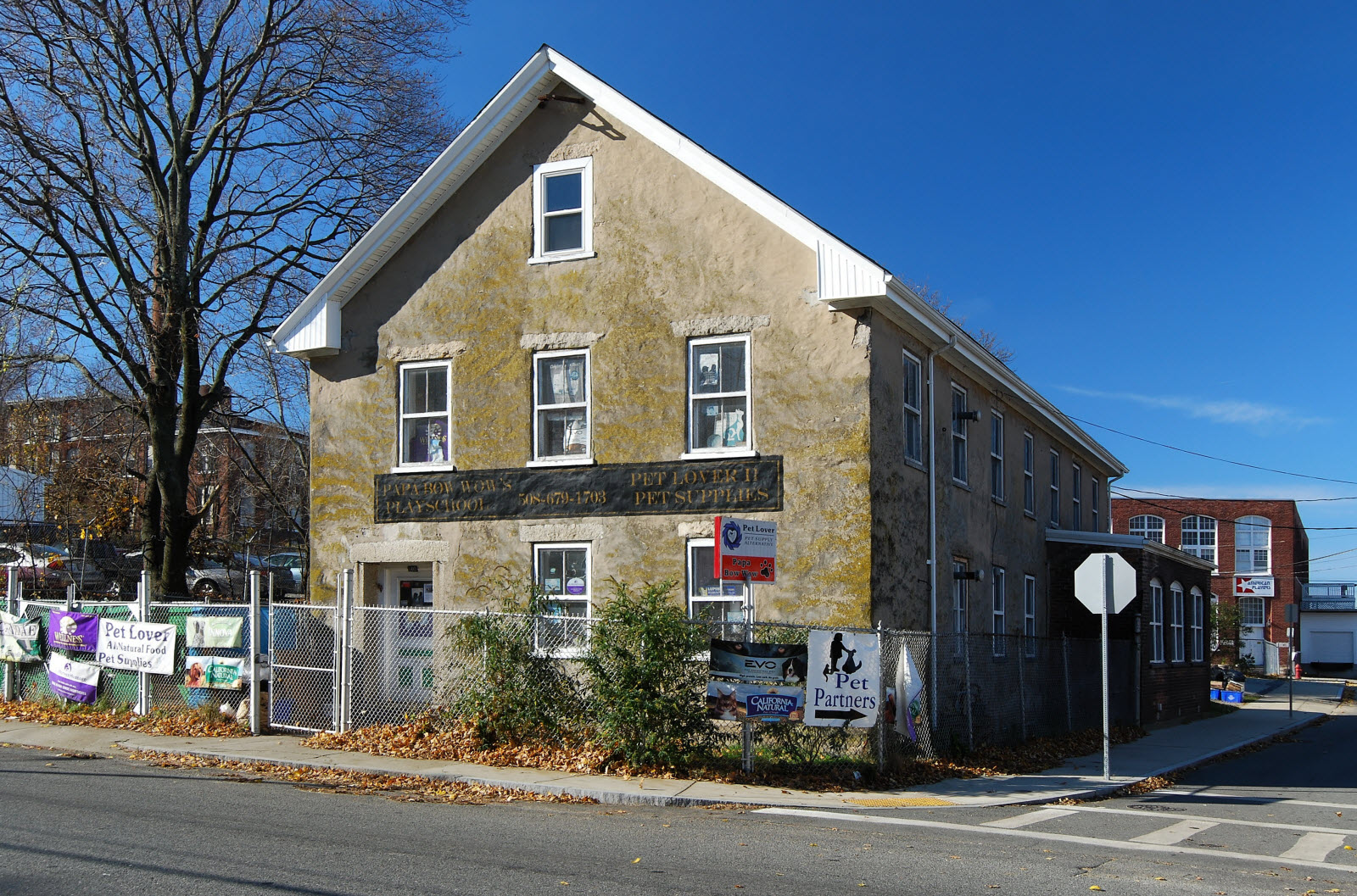

- Location within Massachusetts Location within the United States
- Location: Fall River, Massachusetts
- Coordinates: 41°41′36″N 71°10′38″W
- Built: 1840
- Architectural style: Greek Revival
- MPS: Fall River MRA
- NRHP reference No.: 83000649
- Added to NRHP: February 16, 1983

Oliver Chace's Thread Mill is an historic mill building at 505 Bay Street in Fall River, Massachusetts. It is the remains of a much larger complex. The small building was used as an office and later for storage.

The building was constructed by Oliver Chace in 1840 as part of the adjacent Chace Thread Mill. When it was built, the mill and other buildings were located in what was then part of Tiverton, Rhode Island. It wasn't until 1862 that the State Line was relocated and the site became part of Fall River, Massachusetts. In 1867, the mills were sold and renamed the Mount Hope Mills, which operated until 1878. In 1880, the site was purchased by a group led by Crawford E. Lindsey, and renamed the Conanicut Mills for the production of fine cotton goods. The company later added a small brick weave shed nearby. The mills closed in 1926.

It was added to the National Register of Historic Places in 1983.

== See also ==
- National Register of Historic Places listings in Fall River, Massachusetts
- List of mills in Fall River, Massachusetts
