= Arnold Buffum =

Arnold Buffum (December 13, 1782 – March 13, 1859) was an American Quaker abolitionist who was a member of the New England Anti-Slavery Society and the American Anti-Slavery Society. Circa 1840, he was active in promoting the Liberty Party. His children and grandchildren were also involved in social reform work.

== Biography ==
A native of Smithfield, Rhode Island, Buffum's family were Quakers. Buffum's father, William Buffum, was a member of the colonial-era Rhode Island Abolition Society. Arnold Buffum married Rebecca Gould, who was descended from Daniel Gould, a Quaker who had been given 30 lashes in Boston in 1659 for professing his faith. Arnold and Rebecca (Gould) Buffum had seven children, the most notable of whom were Elizabeth Buffum Chace, Rebecca Buffum Spring, Sarah Gould Buffum Borden (who ran an Underground Railroad station with her husband Nathaniel Briggs Borden), and Edward Buffum, a writer for the New York Herald.

Buffum worked for the New England Anti-Slavery Society with Oliver Johnson, Samuel Joseph May, and Samuel Edmund Sewall. During his Liberty Party years he became the editor of the "first abolition paper in Indiana, and between his lectures and editorials he seriously disturbed the peace of the Quaker church in Indiana." Buffum was dismissed from meetings in both New England and Indiana for his insistent and vociferous liberal activism. Later in life he promoted temperance and the Republican Party.

Buffum struggled financially and had a number of careers (in addition to professional anti-slavery lecturer) such as hat manufacturer, and sheep farmer. Buffum died in 1859 at Raritan Bay Union (near Perth Amboy, New Jersey), the utopian community cofounded by his daughter Rebecca.
