= Troy Cotton & Woolen Manufactory =

Defunct textile manufacturer in Fall River, Massachusetts

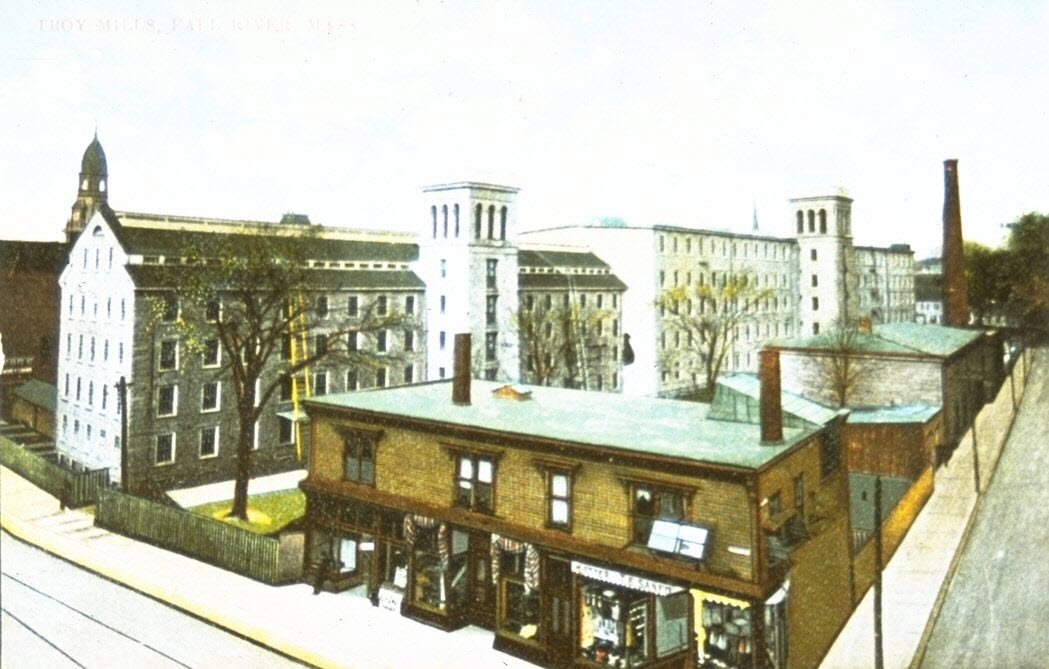
Troy Cotton & Woolen Manufactory

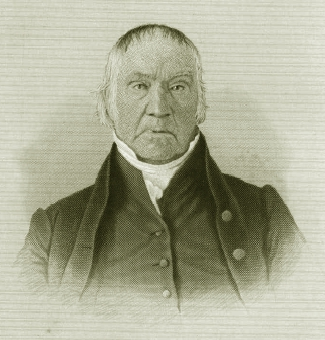
Oliver Chace

The Troy Cotton & Woolen Manufactory was a textile manufacturing company located Fall River, Massachusetts. Founded in 1813 by Oliver Chace, it was the second textile mill to be built over the Quequechan River, after the Fall River Manufactory. It was located at what is now Troy Street between Pleasant and Bedford Streets.

== History ==
The company, originally known as the "Troy Manufacturing Company", was incorporated in March 1813 for $50,000. (Fall River was known as "Troy" between 1804 and 1834). The company's first mill was built over the uppermost falls of the Quequechan River, on the site of a former saw mill. It measured 108 feet long by thirty-seven feet wide with four stories and a low hip roof. It was constructed from field stone collected from the surrounding fields. The mill opened for business in March 1814. In 1821, the original mill was destroyed by fire. Some machinery was rescued however, and moved to a recently completed nearby building known as the "Little Mill". The main mill was rebuilt and opened in 1823.

Oliver Chace remained agent of the mill until 1822, when he moved to the newly formed Pocasset Manufacturing Company. Oliver's son Harvey Chace became the agent at the Troy, and remained until 1842.

The mill was expanded in 1843 and again in 1853, when the old wooden portions were removed.

In 1860, the rebuilt 1823 mill was removed and replaced with a large addition, 296 feet long by 70 feet wide and five stories high, stretching north to Bedford Street.

By 1917, the Troy Cotton & Woolen Manufactory contained a capacity of 52,544 spindles and 1,170 looms. It produced plain cotton weaves from print cloth yarns.

The company operated until 1929. The mills were later occupied by various businesses, including garment industries.

It was demolished in the 1960s as part of urban renewal and to make way for Interstate 195. The site now contains a parking lot that is used by the nearby post office.

== See also ==
- List of mills in Fall River, Massachusetts
