= Pocasset Manufacturing Company =

Defunct cotton mill in Fall River, Massachusetts

Coordinates: 41°42′6.41″N 71°9′23.19″W

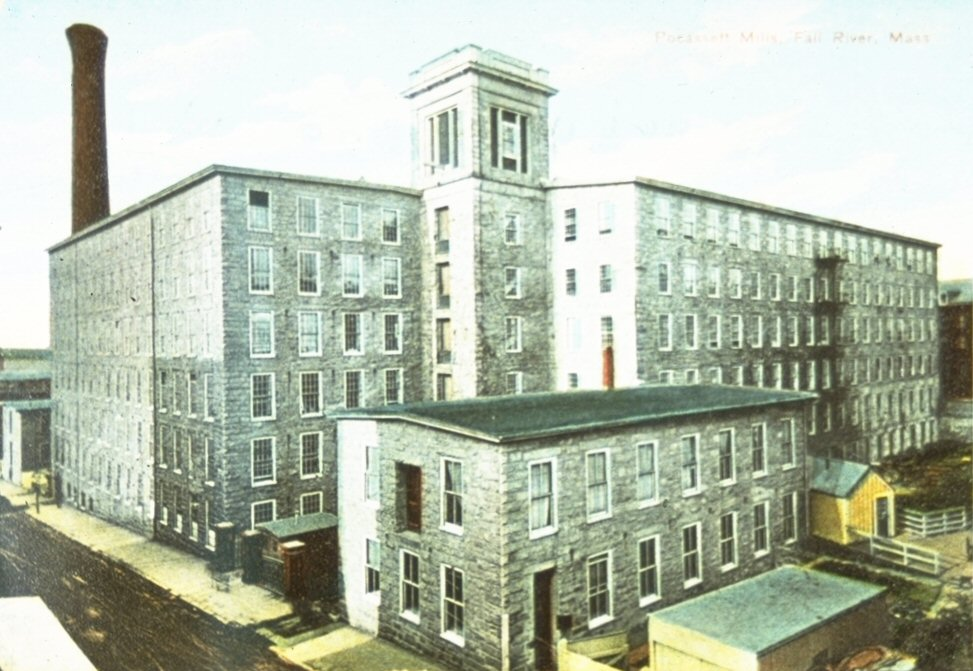
Pocasset Mills, ca. 1900

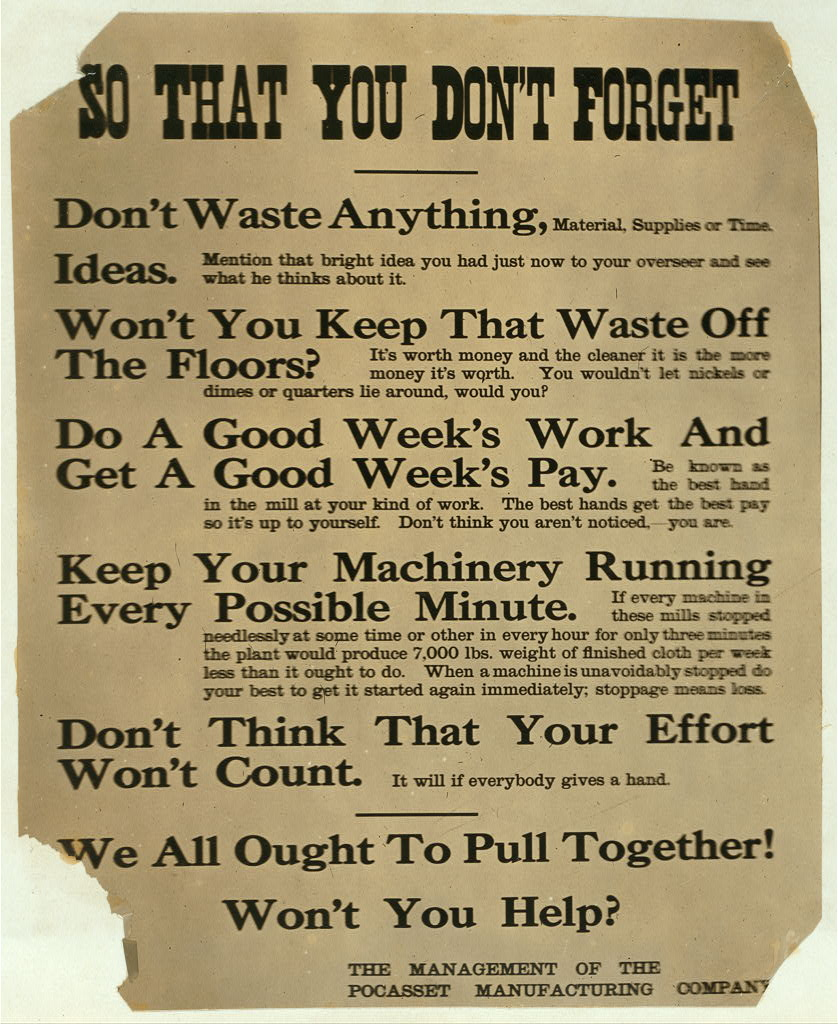
1916 Sign to Employees

Pocasset Manufacturing Company was a cotton textile mill located in Fall River, Massachusetts. It was located just west of Main Street across the second falls of the Quequechan River. It was organized on August 15, 1821, with $100,000 in capital. The mill began operation in 1822, with Samuel Rodman of New Bedford as the principal owner. Oliver Chace, served as the mill's agent until 1837. Nathaniel Briggs Borden was named clerk and treasurer.

The Pocasset Mills were the site of the origin of the Great Fall River Fire of 1928. The mills were destroyed along with a vast portion of the city's business district.

== History ==
In the company's early years, it primarily constructed mills for their various tenants. The first development scheme was intended to enlarge the grist mill, but with Oliver Chace, the grist mill was razed for the erection of a new mill for the production of textiles. The old fulling mill remained. Referred to as the "Bridge Mill", the new mill was constructed from stone with three stories, and measured 100 feet long by 40 feet wide, with a large ell. It was located west of Main Street, immediately north of the Fall River stream.

In 1821, the machinery firm of Harris, Hawes & Company occupied two floors of a building put up for their use by the Pocasset Company. The basement was still used as a grist mill and they also built a water-wheel to raise the water to a convenient level for laundry. The "Bridge Mill" and the fulling mill were destroyed in the Great Fire of 1843. The company built the original Granite Block here a few years after the fire. It became the center of business activity in Fall River for many years.

In 1825, the stone Satinet Mill was erected. It was partly occupied by the first calico printing business in Fall River, set up by Andrew Robeson. The south half was occupied by John and Jesse Eddy for the manufacture of satinets. It was made 3-5 story building made of Fall River granite. It was demolished in 1846 for construction of the new Pocasset Mill #1.

West of the printing mill, the Quequechan Mill was built in 1826. It was called the "New Pocasset" and was leased for a yarn mill. Considered an extremely large mill for its time, it was a five-story stone building that was 319 ft long and 48 feet wide. It contained 16,392 spindles and 492 looms. It was in the Quequechan Mill that Holder Borden set up the cloth printing business that would later become the American Print Works. This mill was demolished about 1880 for expansion of Pocasset Mills #2 and #3.

Also in 1825, the Watuppa Reservoir Company, was incorporated under a special statute by the Massachusetts and Rhode Island state legislature. It was authorized to make reservations of water in the ponds by erecting a dam to raise the water by two feet. Nathaniel Briggs Borden as a member of this private entity, enabled Pocasset Manufacturing to take advantage of the increase in the river flow speed to allow them to build more mills for lease. Previously use of land and waterfalls were controlled by Troy Cotton & Woolen Manufactory. The Watuppa Reservoir Company built a dam below the Troy Company dam.

In 1826 the Pocasset constructed still another stone building which was known as the Massasoit Mill and later called the Watuppa Mill. This mill had 9,000 spindles, 224 looms This mill was later operated as Pocasset Mill #4. It was destroyed by fire along with the main plant in February 1928.

In 1847, the Pocasset Mill #1 commenced running. Built on the site of the Satinet Mill, it was a five-story stone building that was 208 ft long and 75 feet wide. It was the first of the so-called "wide" mills and contained 20,352 spindles and 422 looms. The machinery was run by three turbine wheels, which were later supplemented by a Corliss engine fed by a steam plant with eighteen condensers. The building had its own fire apparatus including pumps and sprinklers. The Pocasset Mill made sheetings and shirtings. By 1877, the company employed 550 and owned fifty four tenements. The number of stockholders increased to twenty one.

In 1899, a complete electric light plant was installed. In 1905 the Pocasset replaced 16,000 mule spinners with 13,000 frame spindles. That same year, the company also acquired the mill of the Fall River Manufacturing Company, operating it as Mill #5. By 1917, the Poccaset Manufacturing Company was capitalized at $1,200,000 and had a capacity of 123,000 spindles and 2,874 looms. It produced sateens, twills and plain cloths.

The mills operated until 1926, and were destroyed by fire in 1928 during dismantling. The site was later occupied by a bus terminal and parking lot until the early 1960s, when the property was taken by the Commonwealth of Massachusetts for construction of Interstate 195. A portion of the property of the Pocasset Manufacturing Company is now occupied by the Fall River Chamber of Commerce.

== See also ==
- List of mills in Fall River, Massachusetts
