= Great Fall River fire of 1928 =

Fire in Fall River, Massachusetts, United States

Coordinates: 41°42′6.41″N 71°9′23.19″W

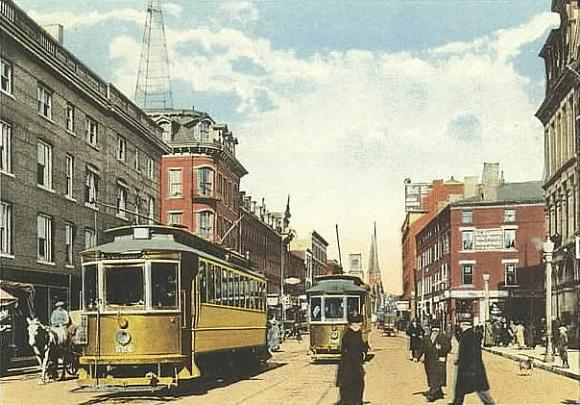
1910 view of downtown Fall River. Many of the buildings seen here were destroyed in the 1928 fire, including the Granite Block on the left, and the Mohican Hotel in the distance on the left, among many others.

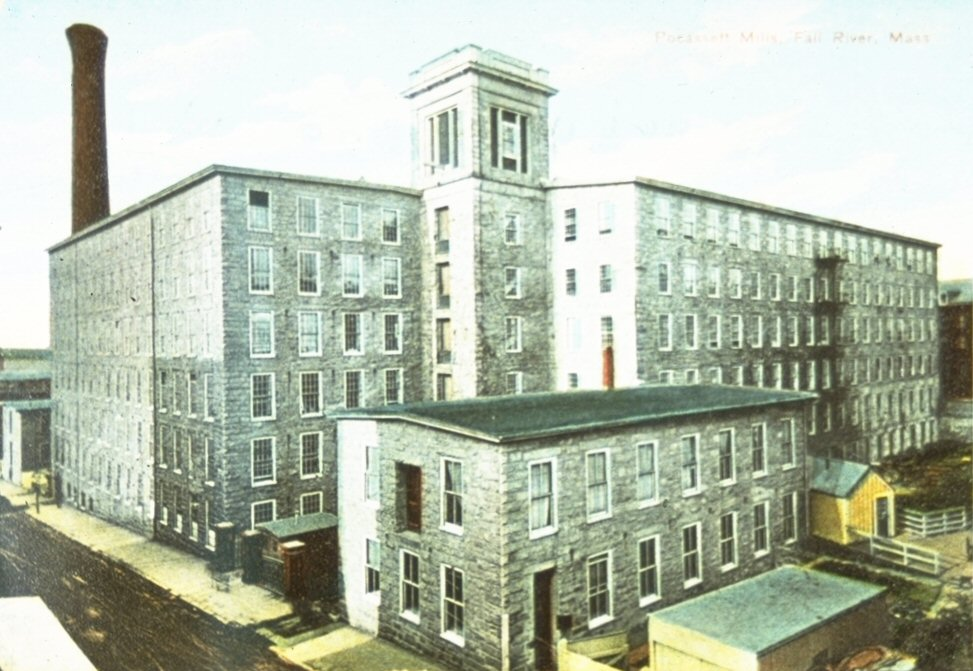
The Pocasset Mills, where the fire began

The Great Fall River fire of 1928 occurred on February 2–3, 1928 and destroyed a vast portion of downtown Fall River, Massachusetts. Although the city has had many other large fires, both before and after, the 1928 conflagration is generally considered the worst in the city's history, since it destroyed so many businesses at a time when the city's economy was already struggling from recent textile plant closings. By the time the fire was out, five city blocks were completely wiped out. Nobody was killed and only a few people suffered serious injuries.

== The blaze ==
At 5:45 p.m. on February 2, 1928, the fire broke out in Mill No. 2 of the Pocasset Manufacturing Company on Pocasset Street. It was a bitter cold evening and demolition workers had been dismantling the recently shuttered mills. The flames spread quickly through the mill complex. Within an hour, Fire Chief Jeremiah F. Sullivan sounded three alarms and called for outside help. By about 7:00 p.m. fire apparatus and departments from surrounding towns and as far away as Boston and Lowell would arrive to provide assistance.

A brisk southwest wind caused the flames to cross Central Street and hampered fire suppression. The wind shifted again to the west, spreading the fire across North Main Street. The wind shifted again to the northwest and drove the fire across Bedford Street. Temperatures hit a record low mark for the season, causing the fire hoses to freeze and hampering the efforts of the firemen.

At 2:30 a.m. the fire was declared under control. City Hall was damaged but had been saved. Various buildings in scattered sections of the area were still burning though.

It was not until Saturday noon, nearly two days after its start, that the fire was officially declared out. Police, National Guardsmen and Naval Reservists also provided assistance with securing the fire damaged areas.

Total damage was estimated at $20,000,000, although the actual amount was widely disputed by local businessmen. The cause of the blaze was determined to have started with a spark from a salamander heater being used by the demolition crew to keep warm.

Within just a few years, many of the banks and commercial businesses were rebuilt, including the Granite Block, at the heart of the business district.

== Buildings destroyed ==
Five banks, three theaters, three hotels, two newspaper plants, twelve office buildings, a Jewish temple and a half dozen lunch rooms were destroyed.

- Union Savings Bank
- Citizens' Savings Bank
- Massasoit-Pocasset Bank
- Metacomet National Bank
- Fall River Co-operative Bank
- Rialto Theater
- Premier Theatre
- Mohican Theater Company
- Mohican Hotel
- Wilbur Hotel
- Bay State Boarding House
- Wilbur House
- Fall River Globe Newspaper Building
- Old Herald-News Building
- L'Independent Publishing company
- Remington Building
- Bennett Building
- Granite Block Building
- Pocasset Mill Building
- Miller Building
- Telephone Company Building
- Kresge Corner
- Talbots Clothing Store
- O'Neil Hardware Store
- Beth-El Synagogue
- Central Police Station
- Bus Terminal

== Damaged buildings ==
- City Hall
- Armory
- Buffington Building
- The Fall River Daily Globe

== Selection of companies damaged ==
- United Cigar Store
- Pen and Pallette, commercial artists
- Service Printing Company
- Thomas G. Barious Company, restaurant
- Conos Brothers, confectionery
- Edwin J. Mills, deputy sheriff
- Eugene S. Sullivan, deputy sheriff
- Fall River Real Estate Association
- Albert A. Belanger, publisher
- Frank Amber, barber
- Herman J. Legare, auctioneer
- Charles S. Graham, auctioneer
- J. H. Hickey, real estate and insurance
- Margaret I. Howarth, lawyer
- Graham Loan Company
- Lake Mailing Company, office supplies
- The Exchange, real estate
- Walker Typewriter Company
- Cook-Taylor Inc., mill supplies
- Cash Brothers, Inc., roofers
- Luxor Cab Company
- E. V . Cloutier, chiropodist
- Cobb, Bates and Yerxa Company, grocers
- Baldwin's Credit Exchange
- Alice Botway, dressmaker
- Herbert A. Borden, stationer
- Brown company, druggists
- George Collias, bootblack
- Eastern Massachusetts Street Railway Company information bureau
- Central News and Delicatessen Company
- Mohican Drug Company, Inc.
- Pacific Oil Company
- Durfee and Canning Company
- Eagle restaurant
- City News Company, news-dealers
- Majestic restaurant
- C. Warburton and Sons, florists
- Crystal restaurant
- The Norfolk Hosiery company
- Joseph M. Madowsky, news agent
- American Optical Company
- Anthony Brothers, music publishers
- Dana C. Everett, cotton broker
- McCartys' band and orchestra
- Fall River Publicity Bureau, publishers
- C. E. Gifford and company, jewelers
- Astor Lunch
- Massachusetts Income Tax office
- Income Tax Assessors
- Fall River Historical Society
- Aetna Life Insurance Company
- Fall River Board of Underwriters
- New England Insurance Exchange
- Troy Co-operative bank
- Hathaway and Company, cotton
- Bryant Chapin, artist
- Gagnon Printing Company
- Ann's Kitchen, restaurant
- Checker Taxi company
- Fall River Navigation Company
- Western Union Telegraph Company
- Staples Coal Company of Fall River
- U.S. Naval Reserves
- The Munroe Press, printers
- Burroughs Adding Machine Company
- John Hancock Mutual Life Insurance company
- Cotton Manufacturers Association
- New York Life Insurance Company
- Fall River Granite & Quarry Company
- James Buffington, cotton cloth
- Aldrich & Hawkins, cotton
- Baldwin-Lesser Company cotton
- Edward T. Robertson & Son, cotton controllers
- Universal Thrift Stamp Company
- Fall River Blue Print company
- Flossie's Kitchen, restaurant
- Fall River Poster Advertising company
- Boston American
- Boston Advertiser
- Providence Journal
- McDermott Lunch company
- City building department, garage
- Smith Oil company, Inc., filling station
- Standard Vulcanizing company
