= Elizabeth Buffum Chace =

American activist

- Born: December 9, 1806; Providence, Rhode Island, U.S.
- Died: December 12, 1899 (aged 93)
- Resting place: Swan Point Cemetery, Providence, Rhode Island, U.S.
- Known for: Activist
- Spouse: Samuel Buffington Chace (m. 1828)
- Children: 10, including Arnold and Lillie
- Relatives: Malcolm Greene Chace (grandson); Richard C. Tolman (grandson); Edward C. Tolman (grandson)

Elizabeth Buffum Chace (December 9, 1806 – December 12, 1899) was an American activist in the anti-slavery, women's rights, and prison reform movements of the mid-to-late 19th century.

She was inducted into the Rhode Island Heritage Hall of Fame in 2002.

== Birth and early life ==
Elizabeth; Buffum Chace was born Elizabeth Buffum in Smithfield, Rhode Island on December 9, 1806, to Arnold Buffum and Rebecca Gould, the Buffum and Gould families were some of the oldest families in New England. A birthright Quaker, Elizabeth Buffum grew up in a household that was anti-slavery, her father Arnold holding strong beliefs in that regard and being president of the New England Anti-Slavery Society.

== Marriage and early activities ==
On April 4, 1828, Buffum married Samuel Buffington Chace, also a birthright Quaker of an old New England family. It was after her marriage to Samuel that Elizabeth began to become truly influential in the anti-slavery movement. Although Samuel was not as outspoken as his wife, he shared her beliefs and together, they opened their home in Valley Falls, Rhode Island as a Station on the Underground Railroad, at great personal risk, to runaway slaves helping them escape to Canada.

Elizabeth had ten children with Samuel. The first five died in childhood to diseases that ravaged the families of that time.

In 1835, Elizabeth helped to found the Fall River Female Anti Slavery Society, after the original group struggled to integrate the free black women who wished to join as members. She and her sisters held the point of view of working to end all racist practices, and not just working towards abolition as the original group intended. She named the group the "Fall River Anti-Slavery Sewing Society" (The word Sewing was later changed to include Female)

== Civil War years ==
With the outbreak of the American Civil War in 1861, the Chaces continued their striving for the outlaw of slavery and although firmly supportive of the Union cause, were disappointed that Abraham Lincoln did not move immediately to abolish slavery. Elizabeth Buffum Chace met and corresponded regularly with many of the most significant Anti-Slavery figures of that time; she associated personally with William Lloyd Garrison, Frederick Douglass, and William Wells Brown, and hosted them frequently at her home.

As an illustration of just how dedicated to and involved in the anti-slavery movement the Buffum family were, while John Brown was being held in Virginia after his actions at Harpers Ferry and right prior to being hanged, Elizabeth's sister Rebecca Buffum and her son Edward journeyed to Virginia from Rhode Island specifically to visit with Brown in his cell. They requested and received special permission from the Virginia authorities to do so thinking that they could "minister" to John Brown. By their own account of the visits, John Brown welcomed them openly.

== Later years ==
In her later life, Elizabeth continued to advocate for the political rights for women and for prison and workplace reform. She and other influential women were involved in the creation of the RI State Home and School for Dependent and Neglected Children, which resulted in a bill in 1884 to create a home for them. The School was opened in 1885. She died on December 12, 1899, aged 93, and was buried at Swan Point Cemetery in Providence, Rhode Island.

== Legacy ==
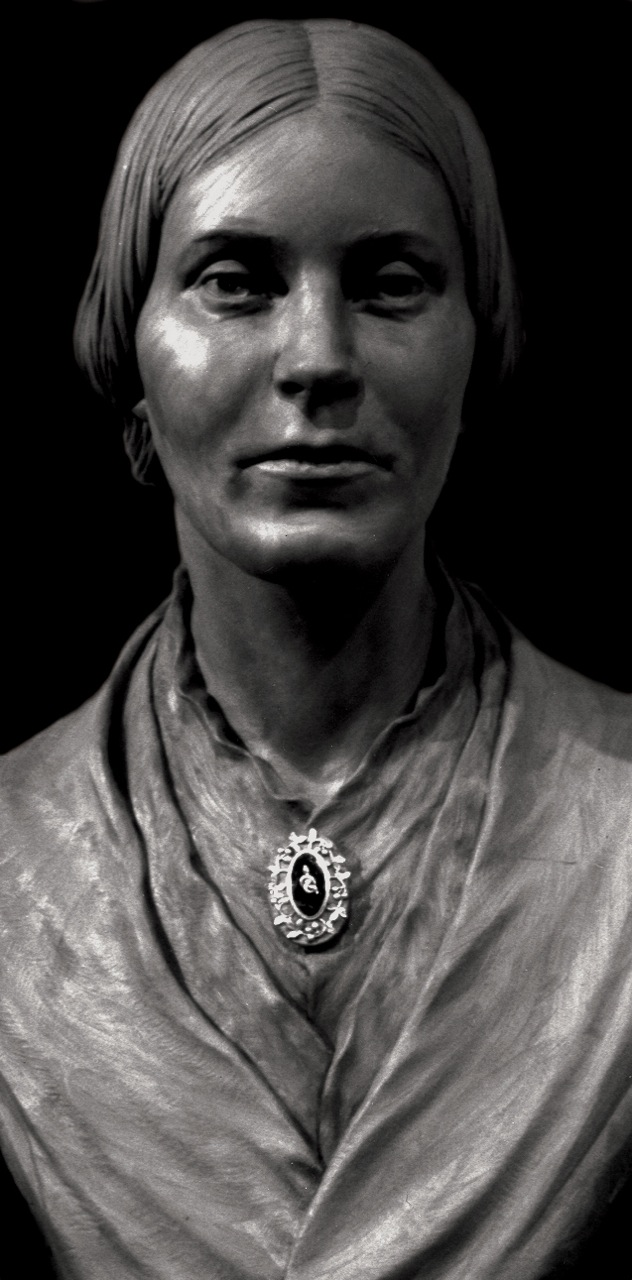
Bronze bust in the Rhode Island State House

Conscience of Rhode Island

In 2001, Rhode Island Secretary of State, Edward S. Inman III selected Elizabeth Buffum Chace out of a field of 36 nominees including Anne Hutchinson and Christiana Carteaux Bannister, to be singularly honored with a bronze bust in the Rhode Island State House as "The Conscience of Rhode Island" for her tireless championing of the rights of the less fortunate. This was the first time in the history of the Rhode Island State House that an image of a woman was displayed within the building. The bust of Elizabeth Buffum Chase was created and sculpted by the Bolivian born artist Pablo Eduardo of Gloucester, Massachusetts.

Influence of the family

Samuel and Elizabeth's progeny played large roles in higher education in the 20th century. Their son, Arnold Buffum Chace, became the Chancellor of Brown University and a renowned mathematician associated with the Rhind Papyrus. Their daughter, Lillie Buffum Chace Wyman, became an author publishing several books and writing regularly for such magazines as The Atlantic Monthly in addition to being a tireless social reformer.

Samuel and Elizabeth's grandson, Malcolm Greene Chace, was a US Collegiate Tennis Champion, and father of American ice hockey. Two of their other grandsons, Richard Chace Tolman and Edward Chace Tolman, both became professors of renown. Richard played a crucial role as Scientific Liaison for the United States Army on the Manhattan Project, and Edward, a pioneer in Behaviorism, successfully sued the University of California, Berkeley for firing him for refusing to sign the infamous Loyalty Oath of the 1950s during the McCarthy Era.

However, the Chace family is perhaps best known for its involvement in textile manufacturing. The textile company associated with the Chace family, the Valley Falls Company, later became known as Berkshire Fine Spinning Associates, later Berkshire Hathaway.

Influence on the Foundation of the Rhode Island State Home and School

Buffum was one of the largest impetuses in the Foundation of the Rhode Island State Home and School in 1885.

== See also ==
- Oliver Chace
