= Arnold Buffum Chace =

American academic (1845–1932)

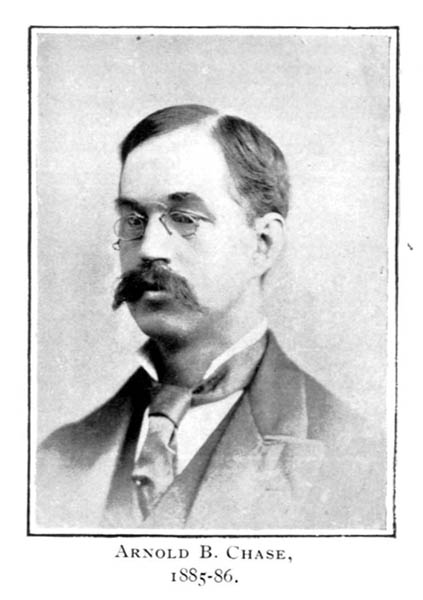

11th Chancellor of Brown University
- In office 1907–1932
- Preceded by: William Goddard
- Succeeded by: Henry D. Sharpe

Personal details
- Born: November 10, 1845 Cumberland, Rhode Island, U.S.
- Died: February 28, 1932 (aged 86) Providence, Rhode Island, U.S.
- Resting place: Swan Point Cemetery
- Spouse: Eliza Greene (m. 1871)
- Children: 3, including Malcolm Greene Chace
- Parents: Samuel Buffington Chace; Elizabeth Buffum Chace
- Relatives: Lillie Buffum Chace Wyman (sister); Oliver Chace (grandfather)
- Education: Brown University
- Occupation: Mathematician, banker, businessman

Arnold Buffum Chace (November 10, 1845 – February 28, 1932) was an American textile businessman, mathematics scholar, and eleventh chancellor of Brown University in Providence, Rhode Island.

== Family ==
Arnold was born November 10, 1845, in Cumberland, Rhode Island. His paternal grandfather Oliver Chace was founder of the Valley Falls textile company, which later became Berkshire Hathaway. His parents Samuel Buffington Chace and Elizabeth Buffum Chace were Quakers and prominent anti-slavery activists. His maternal grandfather, Arnold Buffum, was president of the New England Anti-Slavery Society. His sister Lillie became an author and social reformer.

Arnold married Eliza Chace Greene, daughter of Christopher A. and Sarah A. Greene, on October 24, 1871. Their three children were: Malcolm Greene Chace, Edward Gould Chace, cotton manufacturer, and Margaret Chace, wife of Russell S. Rowland, M.D. of Detroit, MI.

== Academics ==
Arnold Buffum Chace received his bachelor's degree from Brown University in 1866 and a Doctor of Science from Brown in 1892. He also studied for one year at the École de Médecine in Paris. Chace taught physics and mathematics for one term at Brown (1868–69), before having to interrupt his career to handle the family textile business. He remained involved in leadership at Brown for most of his life. In 1876, he was elected trustee; in 1882 he became treasurer; and in 1907 he was elected Chancellor.

Chace's lifelong passion was mathematics. He wrote many articles on mathematical subjects, including one called "A Certain Class of Cubic Surfaces Treated by Quaternions" in the Journal of Mathematics. He attended the International Mathematical Congress at Cambridge, England in 1912. Chace published his work on the Egyptian Rhind Papyrus in 1927 and 1929, at age 87.

== Business and banking ==
His academic career was interrupted in 1869, when he became responsible for his family's cotton mill on the death of a family member. In 1871, he became a director of Westminster Bank, and in 1894 he became its president. He was also a director of the National Bank of North America. During this time, he managed to attend mathematics classes at Harvard once a week.

== Death and burial ==
Chace died in Providence, Rhode Island, on February 28, 1932 and is buried at Swan Point Cemetery.
