= Valley Falls Company =

American textile company, antedecent of Berkshire Hathaway

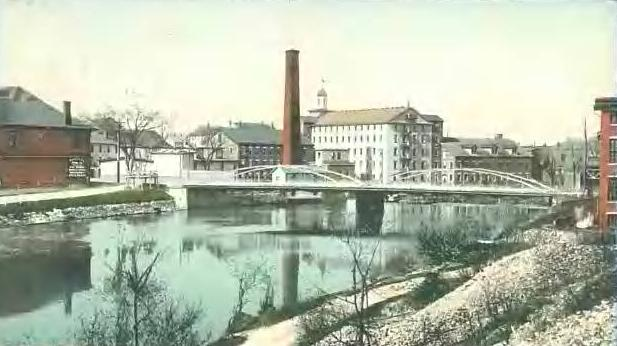
Valley Falls, Cumberland side, 1906

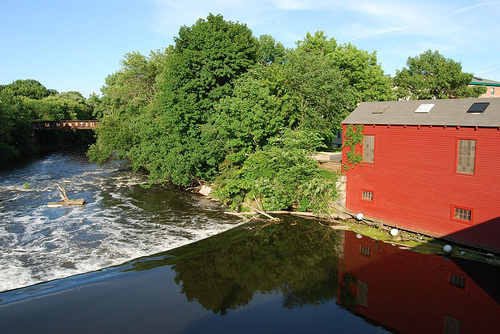
Valley Falls Dam, Central Falls gate house

The Valley Falls Company was founded in 1839 by Oliver Chace, in Valley Falls, Rhode Island, a historic mill village on both sides of the Blackstone River, within the modern-day town of Cumberland and city of Central Falls, Rhode Island. The Valley Falls Company is the original antecedent of Berkshire Hathaway, currently one of the world's largest and most successful companies.

Oliver Chace began his career as a carpenter working for pioneer industrialist Samuel Slater in Pawtucket, Rhode Island. Later, he would become influential in organizing several new mills, including one at Fall River, Massachusetts in 1813.

The first textile manufacturing company at Valley Falls was established in 1818. By 1839, Oliver Chace was a very successful figure in the rapidly developing textile industry. He acquired and reorganized the Valley Falls mills, and eventually added two larger mills, one on each side of the river. His sons Samuel and Harvey would also be involved with expanding the company during this time. The north side of the Village of Valley Falls grew to be the center of town government for the Town of Cumberland which it was located in. The town hall is located there today.

The southern part of the village of Valley Falls, originally part of Lincoln, Rhode Island, would eventually become part of the City of Central Falls in 1895.

The Valley Falls Company would eventually acquire the Albion Mills, Tar-Kiln Factory in Burrillville, Manville Mills in Rhode Island, and Moodus Cotton Factory in Connecticut. In 1929, the Valley Falls Company, and others would combine with the Berkshire Manufacturing Company of Adams, Massachusetts to become Berkshire Fine Spinning Associates. The Valley Falls mills were closed in 1930, and operations were moved elsewhere.

The mills on the Cumberland side were demolished in 1934 to avoid property taxes. The site remained vacant until 1991 when the Town of Cumberland and the Blackstone Valley National Heritage Corridor transformed the site into a historic park. Walkways, ramps and bridges meander along the steep slope and through the former mill site. Some of its foundations are still visible, as is the northern power canal trench.

The 1855 brick mill on the southern, Central Falls side still remains, having been converted into senior housing in 1979; it is listed on the National Register of Historic Places. It ranks as one of the earliest mill conversion projects in New England. Although the older mill closer to the river has been significantly altered and a large addition was built east of the main mill, it is still possible to observe the original power trench which flows through the mills, as well as the original brick mill tower. The gate house that directed water into the trench still stands by the dam. A similar structure once stood in the park on the Cumberland side of the falls, but is no longer standing. Parts of its foundation are still visible, as is the northern power canal.

== See also ==
- Warren Buffett
