= Oliver Chace =

American businessman

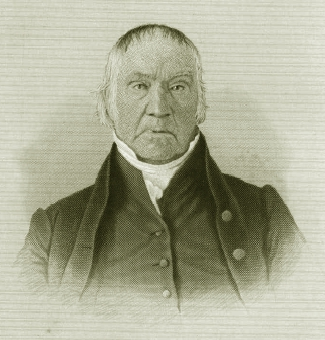
- Born: August 24, 1769; Swansea, Massachusetts, British America
- Died: May 21, 1852 (aged 82); Tiverton, Rhode Island, U.S.
- Occupation: Businessman
- Spouses: Susanna Buffington (m. 1796; died 1827); Patience Robinson
- Children: 7
- Relatives: Arnold Buffum Chace (grandson); Lillie Buffum Chace Wyman (granddaughter); Malcolm Greene Chace (great-grandson)

Oliver Chace (August 24, 1769 – May 21, 1852) was an American 18th and 19th-century businessman. He was the founder of several New England textile manufacturing companies in the early 19th century, including the Valley Falls Company, the original antecedent of Berkshire Hathaway, which as of 2019 is one of the largest and most valuable companies in the world.

== Early life ==
Chace was born on August 24, 1769, in Swansea, Massachusetts, to Jonathan Chace and Mary Earle, members of well known Yankee families in New England who had come from England in 1630 in the Puritan fleet with Governor John Winthrop. Chace and his family were Quakers (Society of Friends).

== Career ==
As a young man, Chace worked as a carpenter for Samuel Slater, who established one of the first successful textile mills in the Americas at Pawtucket, Rhode Island, in 1793. In 1806, Chace eventually started his own textile mill in Swansea, Massachusetts, and then the Troy Cotton & Woolen Manufactory in 1813 in Fall River, Massachusetts, and the Pocasset Manufacturing Company in 1821, also at Fall River. He later acquired and reorganized the Valley Falls Company in Valley Falls, Rhode Island, in 1839.

The Valley Falls Company would eventually acquire the Albion Mills, Tar-Kiln Factory in Burrillville, Manville Mills in Rhode Island, and Moodus Cotton Factory in Connecticut.

Chace's sons and nephews would also be involved in the textile industry of Fall River, Massachusetts, and Valley Falls, Rhode Island, as well as other locations in the area.

He was the father-in-law of Elizabeth Buffum Chace, a noted 19th-century activist in the anti-slavery, women's rights, and prison reform movements. Through her, he was the grandfather of the mathematician Arnold Buffum Chace and the author and activist Lillie Buffum Chace Wyman.

Chace died on May 21, 1852, and was buried in the Old Quaker Burial Ground in Providence on Olive Street.

== Legacy ==
In 1929, the Valley Falls Company, and others, would combine with the Berkshire Manufacturing Company of Adams, Massachusetts, to become Berkshire Fine Spinning Associates. In 1955, Berkshire Fine Spinning Associates would merge with Hathaway Manufacturing Company of New Bedford, Massachusetts, to become Berkshire Hathaway.

Chace's descendant Malcolm Chace Jr. was chairman of Berkshire Hathaway when investor Warren Buffett began buying stock in 1962. When Buffett took control of the company in 1965, Chace refused to sell his share and remained on the board of directors.

== Personal life ==
Chace married Susanna Buffington on September 15, 1796. They had seven children together. Chace's two eldest sons, Harvey (born 1797) and Samuel Buffington (born 1800) would later follow their father into the textile business. Susanna Chace died on July 30, 1827. Oliver's second marriage was to Patience Robinson. They had no children.

== See also ==
- Oliver Chace's Thread Mill
- Valley Falls Company
- History of Fall River, Massachusetts
- Elizabeth Buffum Chace
