= Valley Falls, Rhode Island =

Village and census-designated place in Rhode Island, US

- Census-designated place
- Location in Providence County and the state of Rhode Island.
- Coordinates: 41°55′3″N 71°23′32″W
- Country: United States
- State: Rhode Island
- County: Providence

Area
  - Total: 3.67 sq mi (9.51 km^{2})
  - Land: 3.55 sq mi (9.19 km^{2})
  - Water: 0.12 sq mi (0.32 km^{2})
- Elevation: 105 ft (32 m)

Population (2020)
  - Total: 12,094
  - Density: 3,408.7/sq mi (1,316.12/km^{2})
- Time zone: UTC−5 (Eastern (EST))
  - Summer (DST): UTC−4 (EDT)
- ZIP Code: 02864
- Area code: 401
- FIPS code: 44-72500
- GNIS feature ID: 1218930

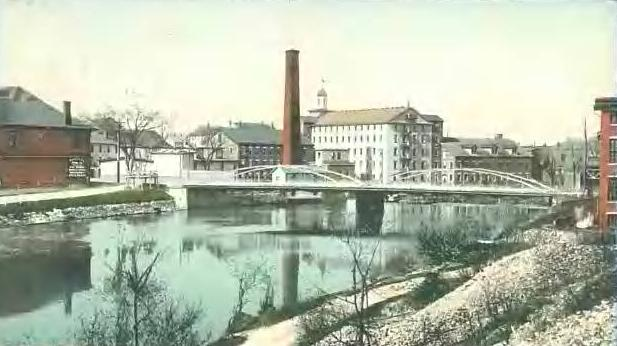
Mills in 1906

Valley Falls is a village and census-designated place (CDP) in the town of Cumberland, Rhode Island, United States. The population was 12,094 at the 2020 census.

Warren Buffett's company Berkshire Hathaway was founded in 1839 by Oliver Chace in Valley Falls as a cotton-manufacturing company, called the Valley Falls Company. Valley Falls is also the home of the Ann & Hope Mill.

== Geography ==
Valley Falls is located at 41°55′03″N 71°23′32″W in the southern part of the town of Cumberland. It is bordered by the city of Central Falls to the south, the city of Attleboro, Massachusetts to the east, and the town of Lincoln to the west. The Blackstone River runs along the western and southern edges of the community.

According to the United States Census Bureau, the CDP has a total area of 9.5 km^{2} (3.7 sq mi), of which 9.2 km^{2} (3.6 sq mi) is land and 0.3 km^{2} (0.12 sq mi) (3.01%) is water.

== Demographics ==
Historical population
Census	Pop.	Note	%±
2020	12,094		—
U.S. Decennial Census

=== 2020 census ===
As of the 2020 census, Valley Falls had a population of 12,094, with 4,818 households and 3,053 families. The population density was 3,408.7 people per square mile (1,316.1 people/km^{2}), and there were 5,027 housing units at an average density of 1,416.9 units per square mile (547.1 units/km^{2}).

The median age was 42.1 years. 20.4% of residents were under the age of 18, 6.8% were from 18 to 24, 26.1% were from 25 to 44, 28.4% were from 45 to 64, and 18.2% were 65 years of age or older. For every 100 females there were 94.9 males, and for every 100 females age 18 and over there were 91.3 males age 18 and over.

100.0% of residents lived in urban areas, while 0.0% lived in rural areas.

There were 4,818 households, of which 29.7% had children under the age of 18 living in them. Of all households, 48.1% were married-couple households, 18.1% were households with a male householder and no spouse or partner present, and 25.6% were households with a female householder and no spouse or partner present. About 26.0% of all households were made up of individuals and 11.8% had someone living alone who was 65 years of age or older.

Non-Hispanic White residents accounted for 77.5% of the population.

Of all housing units, 4.2% were vacant. The homeowner vacancy rate was 0.6% and the rental vacancy rate was 3.8%.

Racial composition as of the 2020 census
Race	Number	Percent
White	9,704	80.2%
Black or African American	360	3.0%
American Indian and Alaska Native	42	0.3%
Asian	186	1.5%
Native Hawaiian and Other Pacific Islander	4	0.0%
Some other race	846	7.0%
Two or more races	952	7.9%
Hispanic or Latino (of any race)	1,538	12.7%

=== Demographic estimates ===
The average household size was 2.5 and the average family size was 3.0. The percent of those with a bachelor's degree or higher was estimated to be 21.0% of the population.

=== Income and poverty ===
The 2016–2020 5-year American Community Survey estimates show that the median household income was $88,927 (with a margin of error of +/- $8,183) and the median family income was $101,415 (+/- $9,974). Males had a median income of $47,752 (+/- $5,915) versus $45,116 (+/- $8,018) for females. The median income for those above 16 years old was $46,121 (+/- $3,101). Approximately, 4.8% of families and 7.6% of the population were below the poverty line, including 11.1% of those under the age of 18 and 10.0% of those ages 65 or over.

=== 2000 census ===
As of the census of 2000, there were 11,599 people, 4,494 households, and 3,258 families residing in the CDP. The population density was 1,261.5 people /km^{2} (3,267 people/mi^{2}). There were 4,668 housing units at an average density of 507.7 units /km^{2} (1,315 units/mi^{2}). The racial makeup of the CDP was 95.88% White, 0.83% African American, 0.11% Native American, 0.52% Asian, 1.42% from other races, and 1.24% from two or more races. Hispanic or Latino of any race were 3.94% of the population. Valley Falls has an extremely large Irish population.

There were 4,494 households, out of which 32.2% had children under the age of 18 living with them, 57.3% were married couples living together, 11.4% had a female householder with no husband present, and 27.5% were non-families. 23.5% of all households were made up of individuals, and 11.5% had someone living alone who was 65 years of age or older. The average household size was 2.57 and the average family size was 3.05.

In the CDP, the population was spread out, with 23.3% under the age of 18, 7.1% from 18 to 24, 30.4% from 25 to 44, 22.8% from 45 to 64, and 16.6% who were 65 years of age or older. The median age was 39 years. For every 100 females, there were 90.3 males. For every 100 females age 18 and over, there were 88.0 males.

The median income for a household in the CDP was $46,163, and the median income for a family was $52,414. Males had a median income of $35,334 versus $25,422 for females. The per capita income for the CDP was $20,373. About 3.8% of families and 5.0% of the population were below the poverty line, including 4.7% of those under age 18 and 10.6% of those age 65 or over.
