= 32nd United States Congress =

1851-1853 U.S. Congress

←	31st	33rd	→
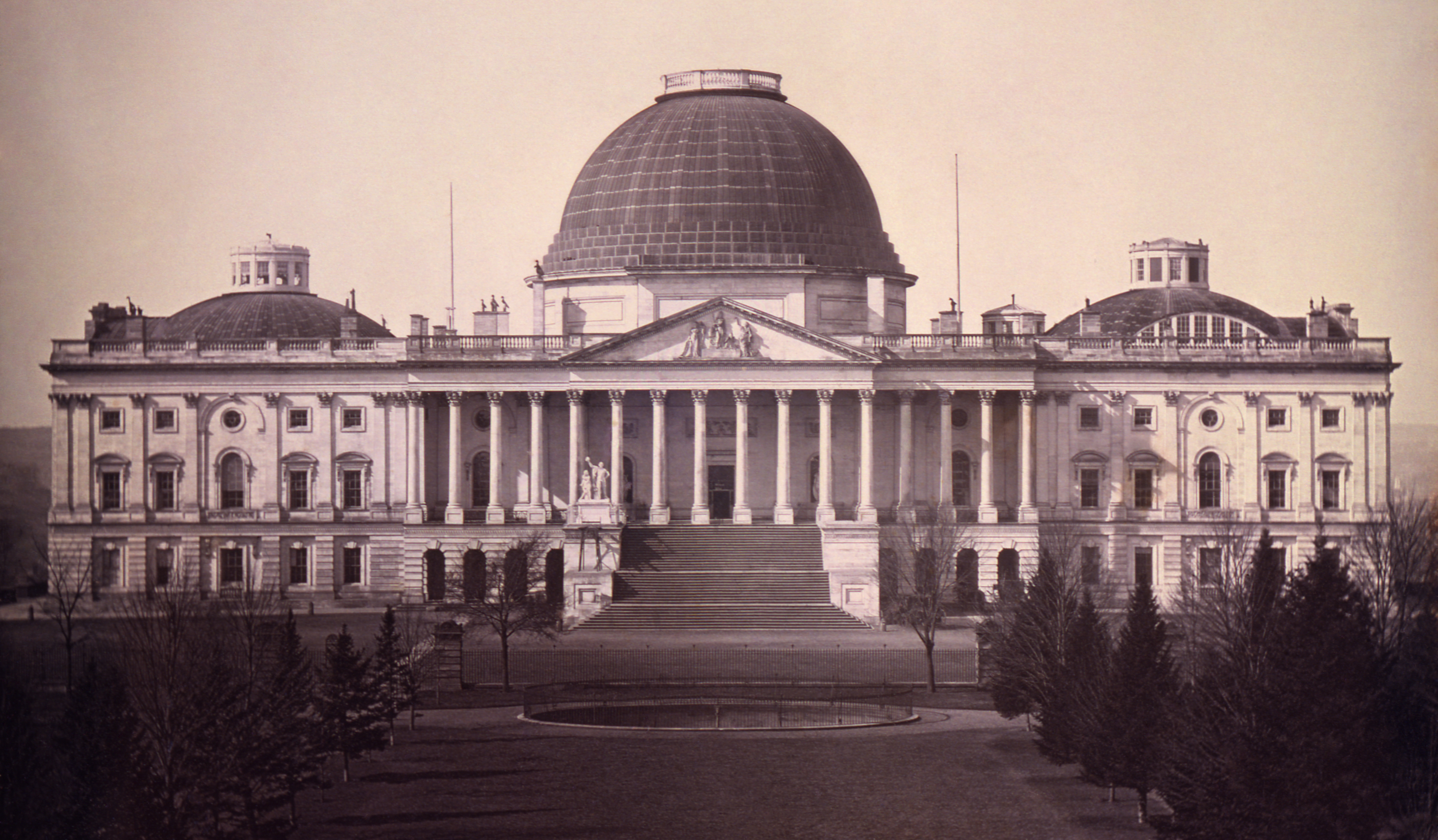
- United States Capitol (1846)

Overview
- Legislative body: United States Congress
- Jurisdiction: United States
- Term: March 4, 1851 – March 4, 1853

Senate
- Members: 62
- President: Vacant
- President pro tempore: William R. King (D); David R. Atchison (D)
- Party control: Democratic

House of Representatives
- Members: 233 representatives 4 non-voting delegates
- Speaker: Linn Boyd (D)
- Party control: Democratic

Sessions
- Special (Note: Special session of the Senate.): March 4, 1851 – March 13, 1851
- 1st: December 1, 1851 – August 31, 1852
- 2nd: December 6, 1852 – March 4, 1853

The 32nd United States Congress was a meeting of the legislative branch of the United States federal government, consisting of the United States Senate and the United States House of Representatives. It met in Washington, D.C. from March 4, 1851, to March 4, 1853, during the last two years of Millard Fillmore's presidency. The apportionment of seats in the House of Representatives was based on the 1840 United States census. Both chambers had a Democratic majority.

It was one of the least active Congresses, forwarding only 74 bills that were signed by the president.

== Major events ==
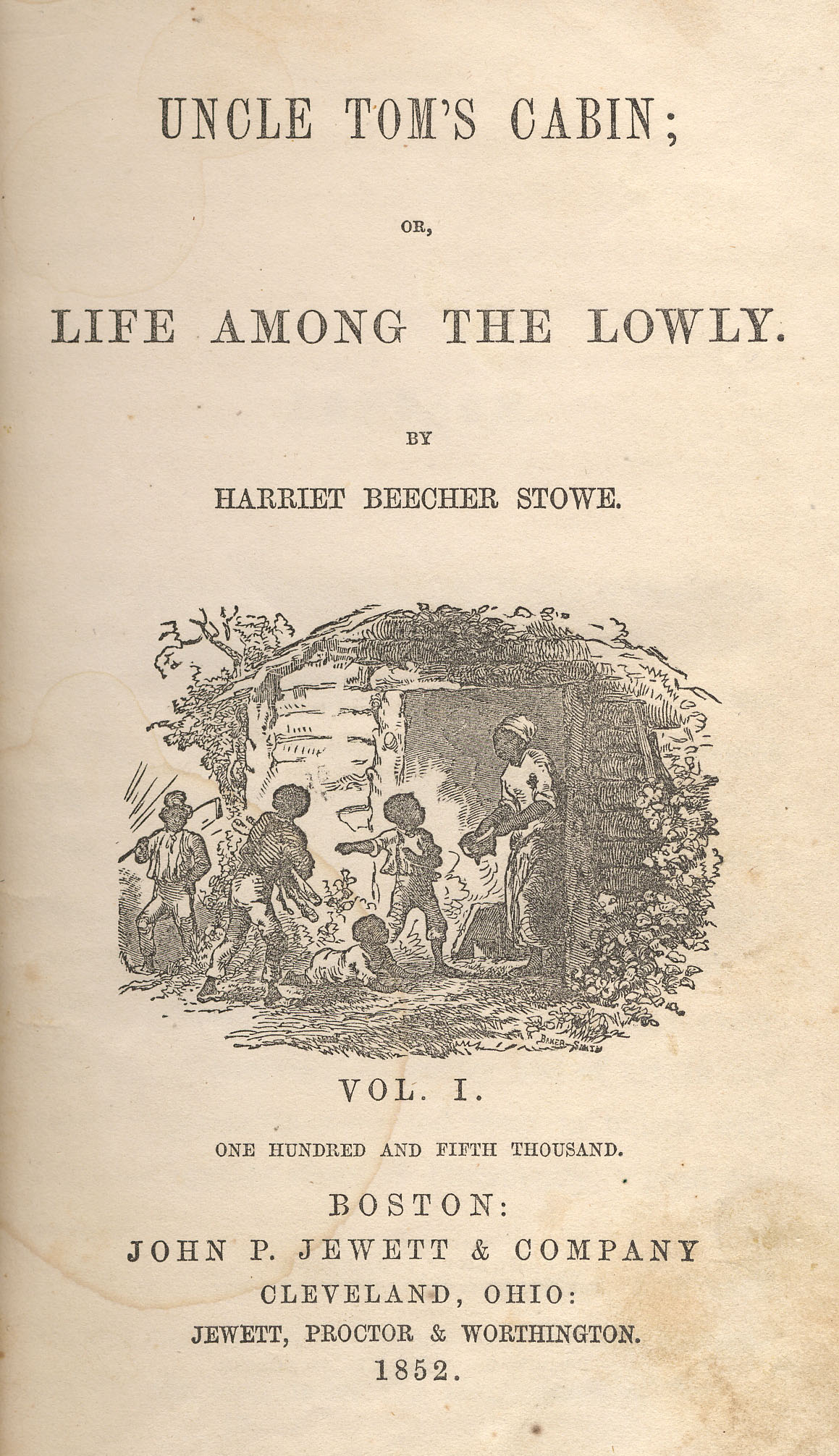
Uncle Tom's Cabin was published in 1852

- March 20, 1852: Uncle Tom's Cabin published.
- July 1, 1852: Henry Clay was the first to lie in state in the United States Capitol rotunda.
- November 2, 1852: 1852 United States presidential election: Democrat Franklin Pierce defeated Whig Winfield Scott.

== Major legislation ==
- March 2, 1853: An act providing for administering the oath of office to William R. King, Vice President elect of the United States of America. Sess. 2, Ch. 93, 10 Stat. 180

== Territories organized ==
- March 2, 1853: Washington Territory was formed from Oregon Territory.

== Party summary ==
=== Senate ===
	Party (shading shows control)			Total	Vacant
	Democratic (D)	Free Soil (FS)	Whig (W)	Total	Vacant
End of previous congress	36	2	24	62	0
Begin	34	2	21	57	5
End	35	3	23	61	1
Final voting share	57.4%	4.9%	37.7%		
Beginning of next congress	36	3	22	61	2

=== House of Representatives ===
	Party (Shading indicates majority caucus)								Total	Vacant
	Democratic (D)	Independent Democratic (ID)	Free Soil (FS)	Southern Rights (SR)	Union (U)	Whig (W)	Independent Whig (IW)	Other	Total	Vacant
End of previous Congress	113	0	9	0	0	107	0	2	231	2
Begin	127	3	4	3	10	85	1	0	233	0
End	125	3	4	3	10	86	1	0	232	1
Final voting share	54.7%	1.3%	1.3%	1.3%	4.3%	36.8%	0.4%	0.0%		
Beginning of next Congress	158	1	3	0	0	71	0	1	234	0

== Leadership ==
Senate presidents pro tempore

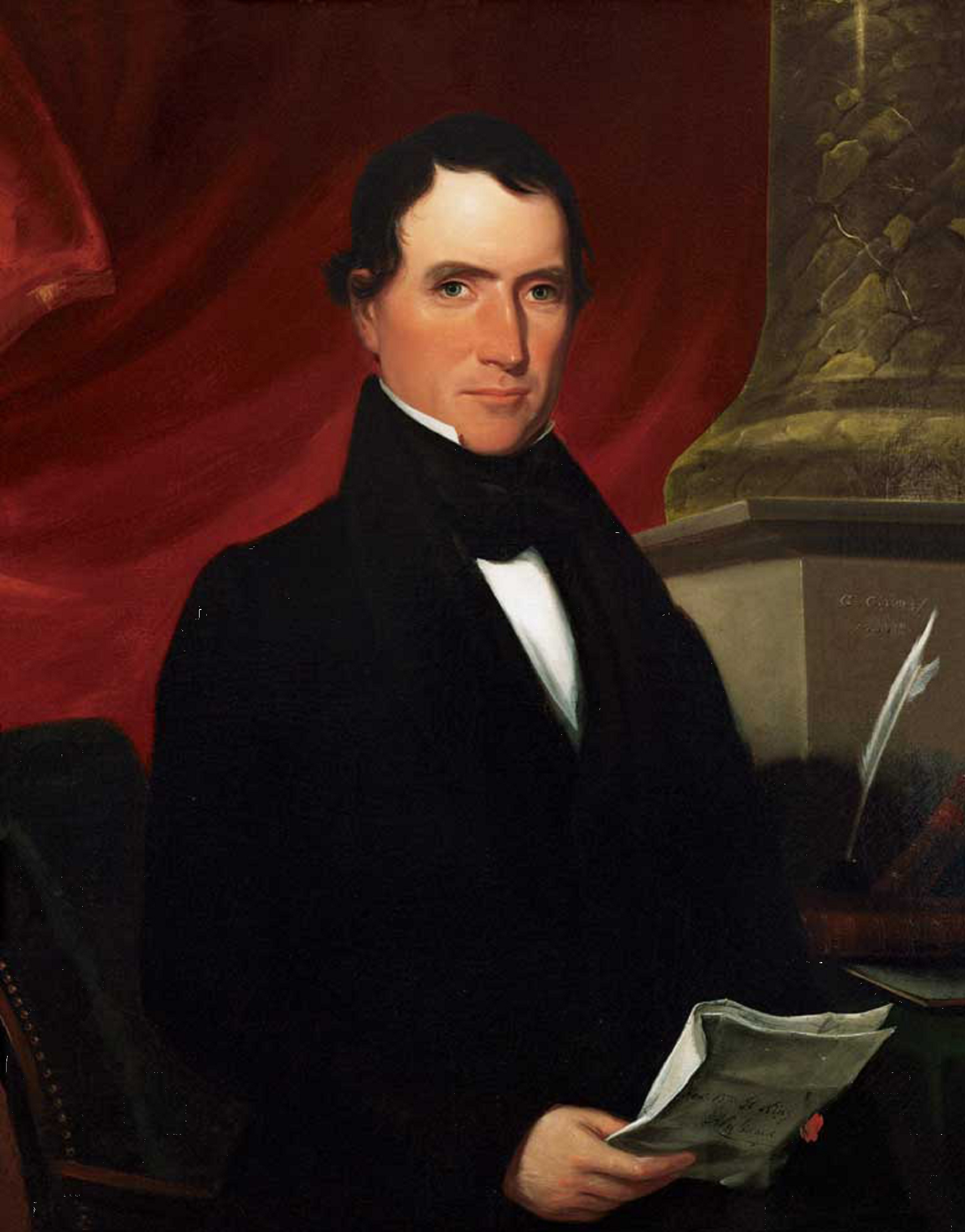
William R. King (D)
(until December 20, 1852)

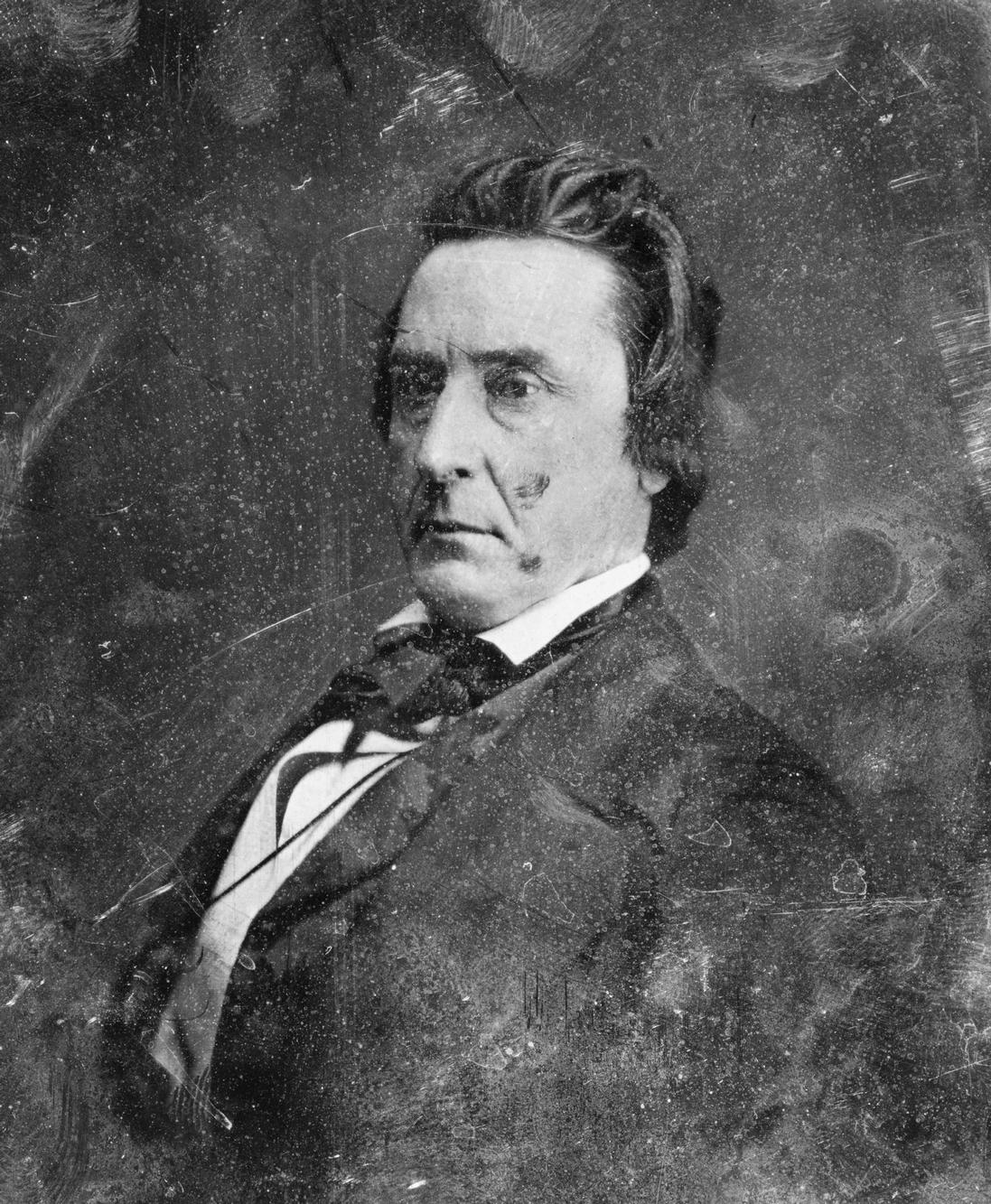
David R. Atchison (D)
(from December 20, 1852)

=== Senate ===
- President: Vacant (since the ascension of Millard Fillmore to U.S. President on July 9, 1850)
- President pro tempore: William R. King (D), until December 20, 1852
  - David R. Atchison (D), from December 20, 1852

=== House of Representatives ===
- Speaker: Linn Boyd (D)

== Members ==
This list is arranged by chamber, then by state. Senators are listed by class and representatives by district.

=== Senate ===
Senators were elected by the state legislatures every two years, with one-third beginning new six-year terms with each Congress. Preceding the names in the list below are Senate class numbers, which indicate the cycle of their election. In this Congress, Class 1 meant their term began with this Congress, facing re-election in 1856; Class 2 meant their term ended with this Congress, facing re-election in 1852; and Class 3 meant their term began in the last Congress, facing re-election in 1854.

==== Alabama ====
▌2. Jeremiah Clemens (D)
▌3. William R. King (D), until December 20, 1852

▌Benjamin Fitzpatrick (D), from January 14, 1853

==== Arkansas ====
▌2. William K. Sebastian (D)
▌3. Solon Borland (D)

==== California ====
▌1. John B. Weller (D), from January 30, 1852
▌3. William M. Gwin (D)

==== Connecticut ====
▌1. Isaac Toucey (D), from May 12, 1852
▌3. Truman Smith (W)

==== Delaware ====
▌1. James A. Bayard Jr. (D)
▌2. Presley Spruance (W)

==== Florida ====
▌1. Stephen Mallory (D)
▌3. Jackson Morton (W)

==== Georgia ====
▌2. John Macpherson Berrien (W), until May 28, 1852

▌Robert M. Charlton (D), from May 31, 1852

▌3. William C. Dawson (W)

==== Illinois ====
▌2. Stephen A. Douglas (D)
▌3. James Shields (D)

==== Indiana ====
▌1. Jesse D. Bright (D)
▌3. James Whitcomb (D), until October 4, 1852

▌Charles W. Cathcart (D), from December 6, 1852, until January 18, 1853
▌John Pettit (D), from January 18, 1853

==== Iowa ====
▌2. George Wallace Jones (D)
▌3. Augustus C. Dodge (D)

==== Kentucky ====
▌2. Joseph R. Underwood (W)
▌3. Henry Clay (W), until June 29, 1852

▌David Meriwether (D), from July 6, 1852, until August 31, 1852
▌Archibald Dixon (W), from September 1, 1852

==== Louisiana ====
▌2. Solomon W. Downs (D)
▌3. Pierre Soulé (D)

==== Maine ====
▌1. Hannibal Hamlin (D)
▌2. James W. Bradbury (D)

==== Maryland ====
▌1. Thomas Pratt (W)
▌3. James A. Pearce (W)

==== Massachusetts ====
▌1. Charles Sumner (FS), from April 24, 1851
▌2. John Davis (W)

==== Michigan ====
▌1. Lewis Cass (D)
▌2. Alpheus Felch (D)

==== Mississippi ====
▌1. Jefferson Davis (D), until September 23, 1851

▌John J. McRae (D), from December 1, 1851, until March 17, 1852
▌Stephen Adams (D), from March 17, 1852

▌2. Henry S. Foote (D), until January 8, 1852

▌Walker Brooke (W), from February 18, 1852

==== Missouri ====
▌1. Henry S. Geyer (W)
▌3. David R. Atchison (D)

==== New Hampshire ====
▌2. John P. Hale (FS)
▌3. Moses Norris Jr. (D)

==== New Jersey ====
▌1. Robert F. Stockton (D), until January 1, 1853
▌2. Jacob W. Miller (W)

==== New York ====
▌1. Hamilton Fish (W), from March 19, 1851
▌3. William H. Seward (W)

==== North Carolina ====
▌2. Willie P. Mangum (W)
▌3. George E. Badger (W)

==== Ohio ====
▌1. Benjamin Wade (W), from March 15, 1851
▌3. Salmon P. Chase (FS)

==== Pennsylvania ====
▌1. Richard Brodhead (D)
▌3. James Cooper (W)

==== Rhode Island ====
▌1. Charles T. James (D)
▌2. John H. Clarke (W)

==== South Carolina ====
▌2. Robert Rhett (D), until May 7, 1852

▌William F. De Saussure (D), from May 10, 1852

▌3. Andrew Butler (D)

==== Tennessee ====
▌1. James C. Jones (W)
▌2. John Bell (W)

==== Texas ====
▌1. Thomas J. Rusk (D)
▌2. Samuel Houston (D)

==== Vermont ====
▌1. Solomon Foot (W)
▌3. William Upham (W), until January 14, 1853

▌Samuel S. Phelps (W), from January 17, 1853

==== Virginia ====
▌1. James M. Mason (D)
▌2. Robert M. T. Hunter (D)

==== Wisconsin ====
▌1. Henry Dodge (D)
▌3. Isaac P. Walker (D)

Senators' party membership by state at the opening of the 32nd Congress in March 1851. The green stripes represent Free Soil. 2 Democrats 1 Democrat and 1 Whig 2 Whigs

=== House of Representatives ===
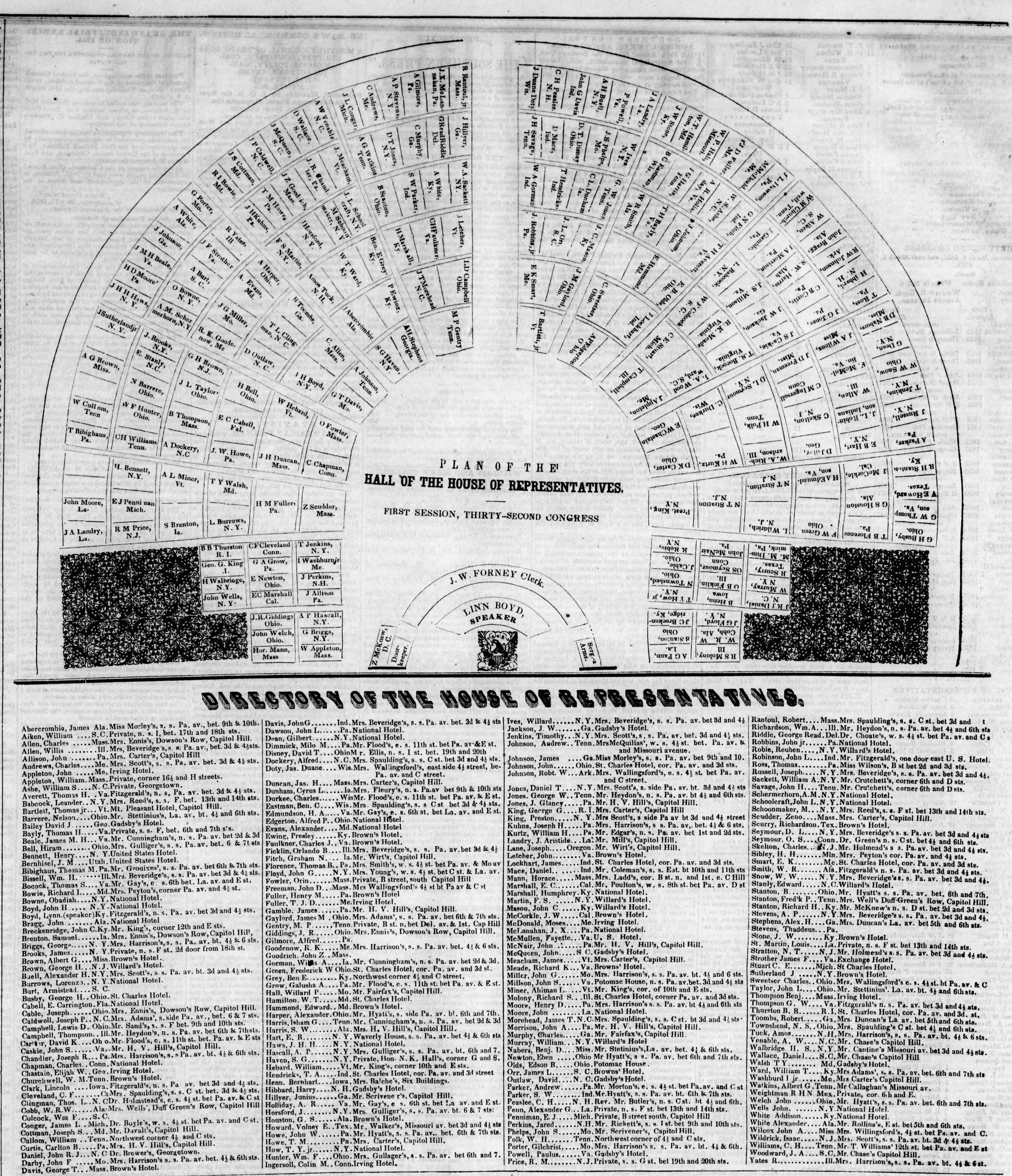
Directory of the U.S. House of Representatives, 32nd Congress, first session

The names of representatives are preceded by their district numbers.

==== Alabama ====
▌1. John Bragg (D)
▌2. James Abercrombie (W)
▌3. Sampson W. Harris (D)
▌4. William R. Smith (U)
▌5. George S. Houston (D)
▌6. Williamson R. W. Cobb (D)
▌7. Alexander White (W)

==== Arkansas ====
▌At-large. Robert W. Johnson (D)

==== California ====
Both representatives were elected statewide on a general ticket.

▌At-large. Edward C. Marshall (D)
▌At-large. Joseph W. McCorkle (D)

==== Connecticut ====
▌1. Charles Chapman (W)
▌2. Colin M. Ingersoll (D)
▌3. Chauncey F. Cleveland (D)
▌4. Origen S. Seymour (D)

==== Delaware ====
▌At-large. George Read Riddle (D)

==== Florida ====
▌At-large. Edward C. Cabell (W)

==== Georgia ====
▌1. Joseph W. Jackson (SR)
▌2. James Johnson (U)
▌3. David J. Bailey (SR)
▌4. Charles Murphey (U)
▌5. Elijah W. Chastain (U)
▌6. Junius Hillyer (U)
▌7. Alexander H. Stephens (U)
▌8. Robert A. Toombs (U)

==== Illinois ====
▌1. William H. Bissell (D)
▌2. Willis Allen (D)
▌3. Orlando B. Ficklin (D)
▌4. Richard S. Molony (D)
▌5. William A. Richardson (D)
▌6. Thompson Campbell (D)
▌7. Richard Yates (W)

==== Indiana ====
▌1. James Lockhart (D)
▌2. Cyrus L. Dunham (D)
▌3. John L. Robinson (D)
▌4. Samuel W. Parker (W)
▌5. Thomas A. Hendricks (D)
▌6. Willis A. Gorman (D)
▌7. John G. Davis (D)
▌8. Daniel Mace (D)
▌9. Graham N. Fitch (D)
▌10. Samuel Brenton (W)

==== Iowa ====
▌1. Bernhart Henn (D)
▌2. Lincoln Clark (D)

==== Kentucky ====
▌1. Linn Boyd (D)
▌2. Benjamin E. Grey (W)
▌3. Presley Ewing (W)
▌4. William T. Ward (W)
▌5. James W. Stone (D)
▌6. Addison White (W)
▌7. Humphrey Marshall (W), until August 4, 1852

▌William Preston (W), from December 6, 1852

▌8. John C. Breckinridge (D)
▌9. John C. Mason (D)
▌10. Richard H. Stanton (D)

==== Louisiana ====
▌1. Louis St. Martin (D)
▌2. J. Aristide Landry (W)
▌3. Alexander G. Penn (D)
▌4. John Moore (W)

==== Maine ====
▌1. Moses MacDonald (D)
▌2. John Appleton (D)
▌3. Robert Goodenow (W)
▌4. Charles Andrews (D), until April 30, 1852

▌Isaac Reed (W), from June 25, 1852

▌5. Ephraim K. Smart (D)
▌6. Israel Washburn Jr. (W)
▌7. Thomas J. D. Fuller (D)

==== Maryland ====
▌1. Richard Bowie (W)
▌2. William T. Hamilton (D)
▌3. Edward Hammond (D)
▌4. Thomas Yates Walsh (W)
▌5. Alexander Evans (W)
▌6. Joseph S. Cottman (IW)

==== Massachusetts ====
▌1. William Appleton (W)
▌2. Robert Rantoul Jr. (D), until August 7, 1852

▌Francis B. Fay (W), from December 13, 1852

▌3. James H. Duncan (W)
▌4. Benjamin Thompson (W), until September 24, 1852

▌Lorenzo Sabine (W), from December 13, 1852

▌5. Charles Allen (FS)
▌6. George T. Davis (W)
▌7. John Z. Goodrich (W)
▌8. Horace Mann (FS)
▌9. Orin Fowler (W), until September 3, 1852

▌Edward P. Little (D), from December 13, 1852

▌10. Zeno Scudder (W)

==== Michigan ====
▌1. Ebenezer J. Penniman (W)
▌2. Charles E. Stuart (D)
▌3. James L. Conger (W)

==== Mississippi ====
▌1. Benjamin D. Nabers (U)
▌2. John A. Wilcox (U)
▌3. John D. Freeman (U)
▌4. Albert G. Brown (SR)

==== Missouri ====
▌1. John F. Darby (W)
▌2. Gilchrist Porter (W)
▌3. John G. Miller (W)
▌4. Willard P. Hall (D)
▌5. John S. Phelps (D)

==== New Hampshire ====
▌1. Amos Tuck (W)
▌2. Charles H. Peaslee (D)
▌3. Jared Perkins (W)
▌4. Harry Hibbard (D)

==== New Jersey ====
▌1. Nathan T. Stratton (D)
▌2. Charles Skelton (D)
▌3. Isaac Wildrick (D)
▌4. George H. Brown (W)
▌5. Rodman M. Price (D)

==== New York ====
▌1. John G. Floyd (D)
▌2. Obadiah Bowne (W)
▌3. Emanuel B. Hart (D)
▌4. John Haws (W)
▌5. George Briggs (W)
▌6. James Brooks (W)
▌7. Abraham P. Stephens (D)
▌8. Gilbert Dean (D)
▌9. William Murray (D)
▌10. Marius Schoonmaker (W)
▌11. Josiah Sutherland (D)
▌12. David L. Seymour (D)
▌13. John L. Schoolcraft (W)
▌14. John H. Boyd (W)
▌15. Joseph Russell (D)
▌16. John Wells (W)
▌17. Alexander H. Buell (D), until January 29, 1853
▌18. Preston King (D)
▌19. Willard Ives (D)
▌20. Timothy Jenkins (D)
▌21. William W. Snow (D)
▌22. Henry Bennett (W)
▌23. Leander Babcock (D)
▌24. Daniel T. Jones (D)
▌25. Thomas Y. Howe Jr. (D)
▌26. Henry S. Walbridge (W)
▌27. William A. Sackett (W)
▌28. Abraham M. Schermerhorn (W)
▌29. Jerediah Horsford (W)
▌30. Reuben Robie (D)
▌31. Frederick S. Martin (W)
▌32. Solomon G. Haven (W)
▌33. Augustus P. Hascall (W)
▌34. Lorenzo Burrows (W)

==== North Carolina ====
▌1. Thomas L. Clingman (W)
▌2. Joseph P. Caldwell (W)
▌3. Alfred Dockery (W)
▌4. James T. Morehead (W)
▌5. Abraham W. Venable (D)
▌6. John R. J. Daniel (D)
▌7. William S. Ashe (D)
▌8. Edward Stanly (W)
▌9. David Outlaw (W)

==== Ohio ====
▌1. David T. Disney (D)
▌2. Lewis D. Campbell (W)
▌3. Hiram Bell (W)
▌4. Benjamin Stanton (W)
▌5. Alfred P. Edgerton (D)
▌6. Frederick W. Green (D)
▌7. Nelson Barrere (W)
▌8. John L. Taylor (W)
▌9. Edson B. Olds (D)
▌10. Charles Sweetser (D)
▌11. George H. Busby (D)
▌12. John Welch (W)
▌13. James M. Gaylord (D)
▌14. Alexander Harper (W)
▌15. William F. Hunter (W)
▌16. John Johnson (ID)
▌17. Joseph Cable (D)
▌18. David K. Cartter (D)
▌19. Eben Newton (W)
▌20. Joshua R. Giddings (FS)
▌21. Norton S. Townshend (D)

==== Pennsylvania ====
▌1. Thomas B. Florence (D)
▌2. Joseph R. Chandler (W)
▌3. Henry D. Moore (W)
▌4. John Robbins Jr. (D)
▌5. John McNair (D)
▌6. Thomas Ross (D)
▌7. John A. Morrison (D)
▌8. Thaddeus Stevens (W)
▌9. J. Glancey Jones (D)
▌10. Milo M. Dimmick (D)
▌11. Henry M. Fuller (W)
▌12. Galusha A. Grow (D)
▌13. James Gamble (D)
▌14. Thomas M. Bibighaus (W)
▌15. William H. Kurtz (D)
▌16. James X. McLanahan (D)
▌17. Andrew Parker (D)
▌18. John L. Dawson (D)
▌19. Joseph H. Kuhns (W)
▌20. John Allison (W)
▌21. Thomas M. Howe (W)
▌22. John W. Howe (W)
▌23. Carlton B. Curtis (D)
▌24. Alfred Gilmore (D)

==== Rhode Island ====
▌1. George G. King (W)
▌2. Benjamin B. Thurston (D)

==== South Carolina ====
▌1. Daniel Wallace (D)
▌2. James L. Orr (D)
▌3. Joseph A. Woodward (D)
▌4. John McQueen (D)
▌5. Armistead Burt (D)
▌6. William Aiken Jr. (D)
▌7. William F. Colcock (D)

==== Tennessee ====
▌1. Andrew Johnson (D)
▌2. Albert G. Watkins (W)
▌3. William M. Churchwell (D)
▌4. John H. Savage (D)
▌5. George W.Jones (D)
▌6. William H. Polk (ID)
▌7. Meredith P. Gentry (W)
▌8. William Cullom (W)
▌9. Isham G. Harris (D)
▌10. Frederick P. Stanton (D)
▌11. Christopher H. Williams (W)

==== Texas ====
▌1. Richardson A. Scurry (D)
▌2. Volney E. Howard (D)

==== Vermont ====
▌1. Ahiman L. Miner (W)
▌2. William Hebard (W)
▌3. James Meacham (W)
▌4. Thomas Bartlett Jr. (D)

==== Virginia ====
▌1. John S. Millson (D)
▌2. Richard K. Meade (D)
▌3. Thomas H. Averett (D)
▌4. Thomas S. Bocock (D)
▌5. Paulus Powell (D)
▌6. John Caskie (D)
▌7. Thomas H. Bayly (D)
▌8. Alexander Holladay (D)
▌9. James F. Strother (W)
▌10. Charles J. Faulkner Sr. (W)
▌11. John Letcher (D)
▌12. Henry A. Edmundson (D)
▌13. LaFayette McMullen (D)
▌14. James M. H. Beale (D)
▌15. George W. Thompson (D), until July 30, 1852

▌Sherrard Clemens (D), from December 6, 1852

==== Wisconsin ====
▌1. Charles Durkee (FS)
▌2. Ben C. Eastman (D)
▌3. James D. Doty (ID)

==== Non-voting members ====
Minnesota Territory. Henry H. Sibley
▌New Mexico Territory. Richard H. Weightman (D)
▌Oregon Territory. Joseph Lane (D)
Utah Territory. John M. Bernhisel

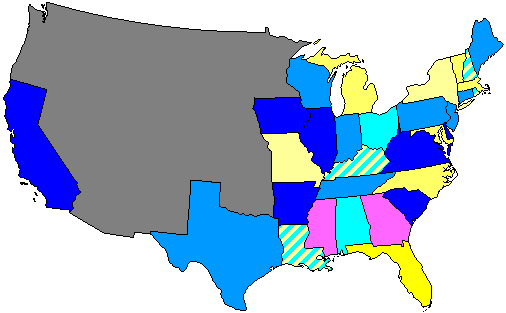
House seats by party holding plurality in state: 80+ to 100% Democratic / Up to 60% Whig; 60+ to 80% Democratic / 60+ to 80% Whig; Up to 60% Democratic / 80+ to 100% Whig; 60+ to 80% Union

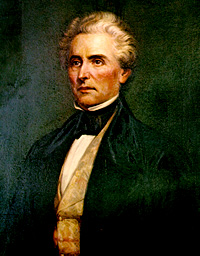
Speaker of the House Linn Boyd

== Changes in membership ==
The count below reflects changes from the beginning of the first session of this Congress.

=== Senate ===
- Replacements: 8
  - Democrats (D): 1 seat net gain
  - Whigs (W): 1 seat net loss
- Deaths: 3
- Resignations: 6
- Interim appointments: 3
- Total seats with changes: 13

Senate changes
State (class)	Vacated by	Reason for change	Successor	Date of successor's formal installation (Note: When seated or oath administered, not necessarily when service began.)
Ohio (1)	Vacant	Failure to elect. The winner was elected late on March 15, 1851, on the 37th ballot over the incumbent appointee. Successor was elected March 15, 1851.	Benjamin Wade (W)	Elected March 15, 1851
New York (1)	Vacant	Failure to elect. Successor was elected March 19, 1851.	Hamilton Fish (W)	Elected March 19, 1851
Massachusetts (1)	Vacant	Failure to elect. Successor was elected April 24, 1851.	Charles Sumner (FS)	Elected April 24, 1851
California (1)	Vacant	Failure to elect. Successor was elected January 30, 1852.	John B. Weller (D)	Elected January 30, 1852
Connecticut (1)	Vacant	Failure to elect. Successor was elected May 12, 1852.	Isaac Toucey (D)	Seated May 12, 1852
Mississippi (1)	Jefferson Davis (D)	Resigned September 23, 1851, to run for Governor of Mississippi. Successor appointed December 1, 1851.	John J. McRae (D)	Appointed December 1, 1851
Mississippi (2)	Henry S. Foote (D)	Resigned January 8, 1852, to become Governor of Mississippi. Successor elected February 18, 1852.	Walker Brooke (W)	Elected February 18, 1852
Mississippi (1)	John J. McRae (D)	Appointee was replaced by an elected successor. Successor elected March 17, 1852.	Stephen Adams (D)	Elected March 17, 1852
South Carolina (2)	Robert Rhett (D)	Resigned May 7, 1852. Successor appointed May 10, 1852, and elected sometime thereafter to finish the term.	William F. De Saussure (D)	Appointed May 10, 1852
Georgia (2)	John M. Berrien (W)	Resigned May 28, 1852. Successor appointed May 31, 1852, to finish the term.	Robert M. Charlton (D)	Appointed May 31, 1852
Kentucky (3)	Henry Clay (W)	Died June 29, 1852. Successor appointed July 6, 1852.	David Meriwether (D)	Appointed July 6, 1852
Indiana (3)	James Whitcomb (D)	Died October 4, 1852. Successor appointed December 6, 1852.	Charles W. Cathcart (D)	Appointed December 6, 1852
Kentucky (3)	David Meriwether (D)	Appointee was replaced by an elected successor. Successor elected September 1, 1852.	Archibald Dixon (W)	Elected September 1, 1852
Alabama (3)	William R. King (D)	Resigned December 20, 1852, due to ill health, having recently being elected Vice President of the United States; Successor appointed January 14, 1853, and elected December 12, 1853 thereafter to finish the term.	Benjamin Fitzpatrick (D)	Appointed January 14, 1853
New Jersey (1)	Robert F. Stockton (D)	Resigned January 1, 1853, to become president of the Delaware and Raritan Canal Company. Successor was not elected until the next Congress.	Vacant	Not filled this term
Vermont (3)	William Upham (W)	Died January 14, 1853. Successor appointed January 17, 1853, to continue the term.	Samuel S. Phelps (W)	Appointed January 17, 1853
Indiana (3)	Charles W. Cathcart (D)	Appointee was replaced by an elected successor. Successor elected January 18, 1853.	John Pettit (D)	Elected January 18, 1853

=== House of Representatives ===
- Replacements: 6
  - Democrats (D): 1 seat net loss
  - Whigs (W): 1 seat net gain
- Deaths: 2
- Resignations: 5
- Total seats with changes: 7

House changes
District	Vacated by	Reason for change	Successor	Date of successor's formal installation
Maine 4th	Charles Andrews (D)	Died April 30, 1852	Isaac Reed (W)	Seated June 25, 1852
Virginia 15th	George W. Thompson (D)	Resigned July 30, 1852, after being appointed judge of the Circuit Court of Virginia	Sherrard Clemens (D)	Seated December 6, 1852
Kentucky 7th	Humphrey Marshall (W)	Resigned August 4, 1852, after being appointed Minister to China	William Preston (W)	Seated December 6, 1852
Massachusetts 2nd	Robert Rantoul Jr. (D)	Died August 7, 1852	Francis B. Fay (W)	Seated December 13, 1852
Massachusetts 9th	Orin Fowler (W)	Died September 3, 1852	Edward P. Little (D)	Seated December 13, 1852
Massachusetts 4th	Benjamin Thompson (W)	Died September 24, 1852	Lorenzo Sabine (W)	Seated December 13, 1852
New York 17th	Alexander H. Buell (D)	Died January 29, 1853	Vacant	Not filled this term

== Committees ==
Lists of committees and their party leaders.

=== Senate ===
- Agriculture (Chairman: Pierre Soule)
- Audit and Control the Contingent Expenses of the Senate (Chairman: Augustus Dodge)
- Claims (Chairman: Richard Brodhead)
- Commerce (Chairman: Hannibal Hamlin)
- Contested Election of 1850 (Chairman: N/A)
- Distributing Public Revenue Among the States (Select)
- District of Columbia (Chairman: James Shields)
- Emigrant Route and Telegraphic Line to California (Select)
- Ether Discovery (Select)
- Finance (Chairman: Robert M.T. Hunter)
- Foreign Relations (Chairman: James M. Mason)
- French Spoilations (Select)
- Indian Affairs (Chairman: David R. Atchison)
- Judiciary (Chairman: Andrew P. Butler)
- Manufactures (Chairman: William K. Sebastian)
- Library (Chairman: James A. Pearce)
- Mexican Boundary (Select)
- Mexican Boundary Commission (Select)
- Mexican Claims Commission (Select)
- Military Affairs (Chairman: James Shields)
- Militia (Chairman: Sam Houston)
- Naval Affairs (Chairman: William M. Gwin)
- Ordnance and War Ships (Select)
- Patents and the Patent Office (Chairman: Moses Norris Jr. and Charles T. James)
- Pensions (Chairman: George Wallace Jones)
- Post Office and Post Roads (Chairman: Thomas J. Rusk)
- Printing (Chairman: Hannibal Hamlin)
- Private Land Claims (Chairman: Solomon W. Downs)
- Public Buildings and Grounds (Chairman: James Whitcomb)
- Public Lands (Chairman: Alpheus Felch)
- Purchase of Catlin's Collection of Indian Scenes (Select)
- Retrenchment (Chairman: James W. Bradbury)
- Revolutionary Claims (Chairman: Issac P. Walker)
- Roads and Canals (Chairman: Jesse D. Bright)
- Tariff Regulation (Select)
- Territories (Chairman: Stephen A. Douglas)
- Seventh Census (Select)
- Whole

=== House of Representatives ===
- Accounts (Chairman: John C. Mason)
- Agriculture (Chairman: John G. Floyd)
- Bounty Land Act of 1850 (Select)
- Bounty Land Bill (Chairman: Cyrus L. Dunham)
- Claims (Chairman: John Reeves Jones Daniel)
- Commerce (Chairman: David L. Seymour)
- District of Columbia (Chairman: Orlando B. Ficklin)
- Elections (Chairman: William S. Ashe)
- Engraving (Chairman: Edward Hammond)
- Expenditures in the Navy Department (Chairman: Fayette McMullen)
- Expenditures in the Post Office Department (Chairman: Alexander G. Penn)
- Expenditures in the State Department (Chairman: Charles E. Stuart)
- Expenditures in the Treasury Department (Chairman: Benjamin B. Thurston)
- Expenditures in the War Department (Chairman: Milo M. Dimmick)
- Expenditures on Public Buildings (Chairman: Thomas Bartlett Jr.)
- Foreign Affairs (Chairman: Thomas H. Bayly)
- Indian Affairs (Chairman: Robert W. Johnson)
- Invalid Pensions (Chairman: Isham G. Harris)
- Judiciary (Chairman: James X. McLanahan)
- Manufactures (Chairman: James M.H. Beale)
- Mileage (Chairman: Thomas A. Hendricks)
- Military Affairs (Chairman: William H. Bissell)
- Militia (Chairman: Charles H. Peaslee)
- Naval Affairs (Chairman: Frederick P. Stanton)
- Patents (Chairman: David K. Cartter)
- Post Office and Post Roads (Chairman: Edson B. Olds)
- Private Land Claims (Chairman: Timothy Jenkins)
- Public Buildings and Grounds (Chairman: Richard H. Stanton)
- Public Expenditures (Chairman: Charles Sweetser)
- Public Lands (Chairman: Willard P. Hall)
- Revisal and Unfinished Business (Chairman: Williamson R. W. Cobb)
- Revolutionary Claims (Chairman: Moses Macdonald)
- Revolutionary Pensions (Chairman: John S. Millson)
- Roads and Canals (Chairman: John L. Robinson)
- Rules (Chairman: Willard P. Hall)
- Standards of Official Conduct
- Territories (Chairman: William A. Richardson)
- Ways and Means (Chairman: George S. Houston)
- Whole

=== Joint committees ===
- Enrolled Bills (Chairman: Rep. Isaac Wildrick)
- The Library (Chairman: Joseph R. Chandler)
- Printing (Chairman: Willis A. Gorman)

== Caucuses ==
- Senate Democratic Caucus
- House Democratic Caucus

== Employees ==
=== Legislative branch agency directors ===
- Architect of the Capitol: Thomas U. Walter, appointed June 11, 1851
- Librarian of Congress: John Silva Meehan

=== Senate ===
- Chaplain: Clement M. Butler (Episcopalian)
- Secretary: Asbury Dickins
- Sergeant at Arms: Robert Beale

=== House of Representatives ===
- Chaplain: Ralph Randolph Gurley (Presbyterian), until December 1, 1851
  - Lyttleton Morgan (Methodist), elected December 1, 1851
  - James Gallagher (Presbyterian), elected December 6, 1852
- Clerk: Richard M. Young, until December 1, 1851
  - John W. Forney, from December 1, 1851
- Doorkeeper: Zadock W. McKnew
- Sergeant at Arms: Adam J. Glossbrenner
- Postmaster: John M. Johnson

== See also ==
- 1850 United States elections (elections leading to this Congress)
  - 1850–51 United States Senate elections
  - 1850–51 United States House of Representatives elections
- 1852 United States elections (elections during this Congress, leading to the next Congress)
  - 1852 United States presidential election
  - 1852–53 United States Senate elections
  - 1852–53 United States House of Representatives elections
