= Eli Thayer =

American politician

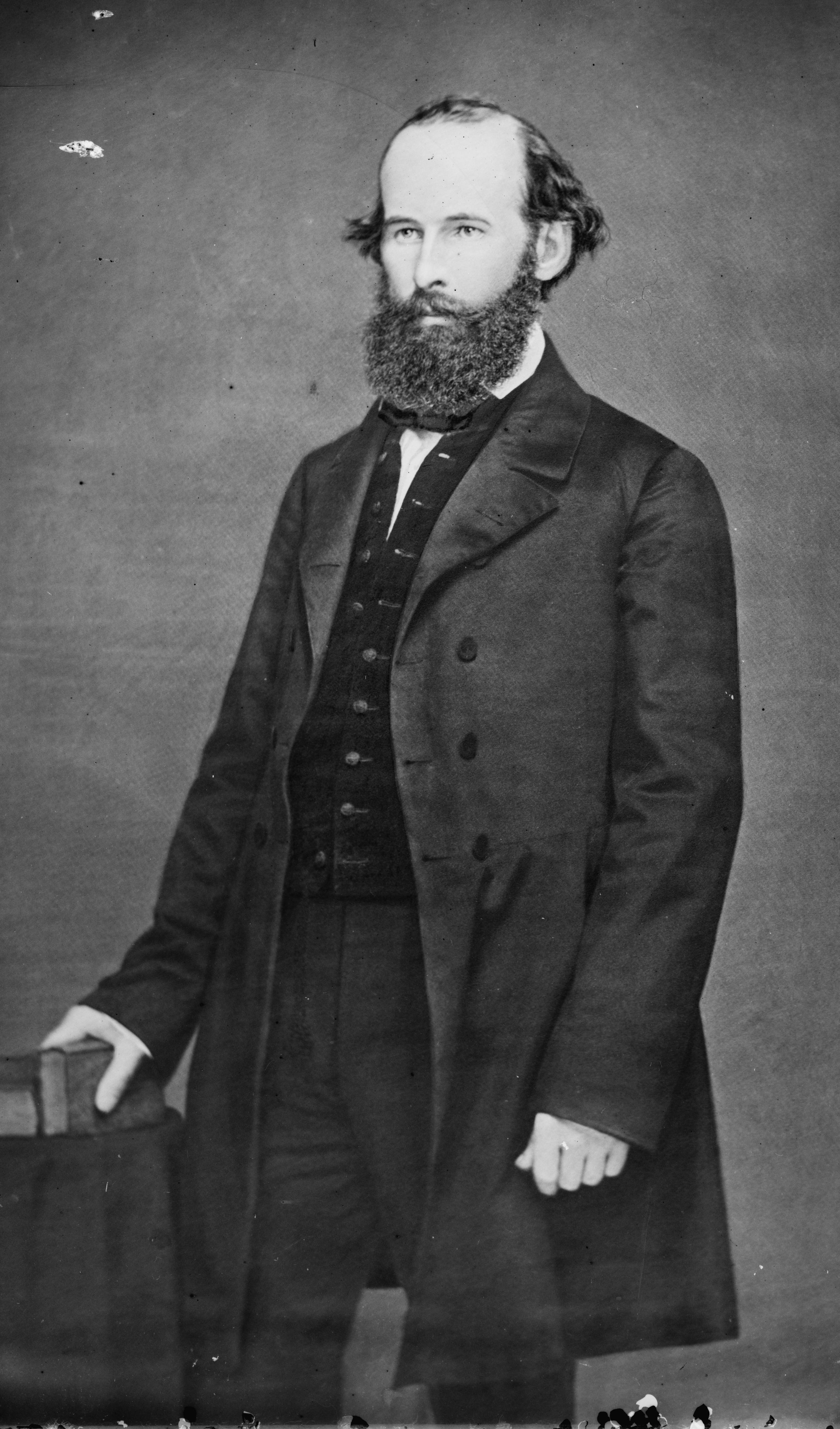

Member of the U.S. House of Representatives from Massachusetts's 9th district
- In office March 4, 1857 – March 3, 1861
- Preceded by: Alexander De Witt
- Succeeded by: Goldsmith Bailey

Personal details
- Born: June 11, 1819 Mendon, Massachusetts
- Died: April 15, 1899 (aged 79) Worcester, Massachusetts
- Resting place: Hope Cemetery
- Party: Whig; Republican Party
- Children: John A. Thayer, Clara Thayer (Mrs. Charles H. Perry M.D.), Ida M. Thayer.
- Education: Worcester Academy, 1840; Brown University, 1845

Eli Thayer (June 11, 1819 – April 15, 1899) was a Republican member of the United States House of Representatives from 1857 to 1861. He was born in Mendon, Massachusetts. He graduated from Worcester Academy in 1840, from Brown University in 1845, and in 1848 founded Oread Institute, a school for young women in Worcester, Massachusetts. He is buried at Hope Cemetery, Worcester.

He is chiefly remembered for his crusade to ensure that the Kansas Territory would enter into the United States as a free state. With this aim in view, early in 1854 Thayer organized the Massachusetts Emigrant Aid Company to send anti-slavery settlers to the Kansas Territory. In 1855, this organization joined with the New York Emigrant Aid Company and the name was changed to the New England Emigrant Aid Company. The motives of Thayer in establishing the New England Emigrant Aid Company were questioned by historian David S. Reynolds, who wrote that Thayer "opposed slavery not on moral grounds but because [he] wanted to foster laissez-faire capitalism in the Territory."

Local leagues were established whose members moved to Kansas and established towns. The Company provided hotels for temporary accommodation (such as the Free State Hotel in Lawrence) and provided sawmills and other improvements. Settlements were established at Manhattan, Lawrence, Topeka, and Osawatomie. The clash of these settlers and other "Free-Stater" Northerners with pro-slavery settlers spawned the violence of Bleeding Kansas.

Thayer wanted to establish an antislavery colony in Virginia, but land was too expensive. He then looked to western Virginia. Thayer chose to build his colony at the mouth of Twelvepole Creek in Wayne County, Virginia (now West Virginia). He named his town Ceredo after the goddess Ceres. The town was founded in 1857.

He enlisted fellow abolitionist Zopher D. Ramsdell to settle there and establish a boot and shoe factory. Ramsdell's house is open (2022) as a historic house museum.

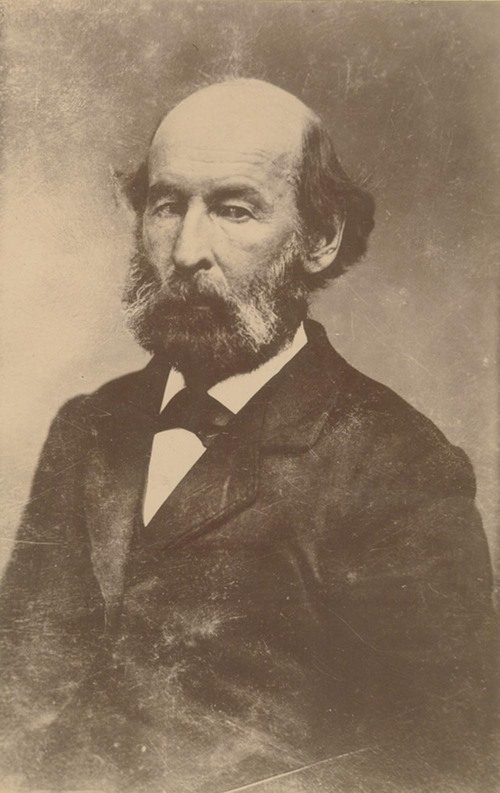
Thayer in his later years

Eli Thayer died at his home in Worcester on April 15, 1899. He was buried in Hope Cemetery in Worcester.

== Books by Thayer ==
- Thayer, Eli (1860). Six speeches, with a sketch of the life of Hon. Eli Thayer. Boston: Brown and Taggard.
- Thayer, Eli (1887). The New England Emigrant Aid Company, and its influence, through the Kansas contest, upon national history. Worcester, Massachusetts: F. P. Rice.
- Thayer, Eli (1889). A history of the Kansas crusade, its friends and its foes. Introduction by Rev. Edward Everett Hale. New York: Harper & Brothers.

U.S. House of Representatives
Preceded by Alexander De Witt	Member of the U.S. House of Representatives from Massachusetts's 9th congressional district 1857–1861	Succeeded by Goldsmith Bailey
