= Rufus K. Goodenow =

American politician (1790–1863)

Member of the U.S. House of Representatives from Maine's 4th district
- In office March 4, 1849 – March 3, 1851
- Preceded by: Franklin Clark
- Succeeded by: Charles Andrews

Personal details
- Born: Rufus King Goodenow; April 24, 1790 Henniker, New Hampshire, U.S.
- Died: March 24, 1863 (aged 72) Paris, Maine, U.S.
- Resting place: Riverside Cemetery, South Paris, Maine, U.S.
- Party: Whig
- Relatives: Robert Goodenow (brother)
- Occupation: Politician, farmer, lawyer

Military service
- Allegiance: United States
- Battles/wars: War of 1812

Rufus King Goodenow (April 24, 1790 – March 24, 1863) was a United States representative from Maine. Born in Henniker, New Hampshire, he moved with his parents to Brownfield, Maine in 1802. He received limited schooling, subsequently engaged in agricultural pursuits. He also made several voyages to European ports and served as a captain in the Thirty-third Regiment, United States Infantry, in the War of 1812. He moved to Paris, Maine in 1821. He was the brother of Robert Goodenow.

He served as clerk of the Oxford County Courts from 1821 to 1837. Goodenow was elected a member of the Maine House of Representatives. He was a delegate to the Whig National Convention at Harrisburg, Pennsylvania in 1839. He studied law, was admitted to the bar and practiced in the courts of Maine. He was elected as a Whig to the Thirty-first Congress (March 4, 1849 – March 3, 1851), and died in Paris, Maine. He was interred in Riverside Cemetery.

U.S. House of Representatives
Preceded by Franklin Clark	Member of the U.S. House of Representatives from Maine's 4th congressional district March 4, 1849 – March 3, 1851 (obsolete district)	Succeeded by Charles Andrews
