= Artemas Hale =

American politician

Member of the U.S. House of Representatives from Massachusetts's 9th district
- In office March 4, 1845 – March 4, 1849
- Preceded by: Henry Williams
- Succeeded by: Orin Fowler

Member of the Massachusetts Senate
- In office 1833-1834

Member of the Massachusetts House of Representatives
- In office 1824-1825; 1827-1828

Personal details
- Born: October 20, 1783 Winchendon, Massachusetts
- Died: August 3, 1882 (aged 98) Bridgewater, Massachusetts
- Profession: teacher

Artemas Hale (October 20, 1783 – August 3, 1882) was a U.S. representative from Massachusetts.

Born in Winchendon, Massachusetts, Hale received a limited education and worked on a farm. He taught school in Hingham, Massachusetts from 1804 to 1814. He became interested in the manufacture of cotton gins in Bridgewater. He served as member of the Massachusetts House of Representatives in 1824, 1825, 1827, and 1828. He served in the Massachusetts Senate in 1833 and 1834. He was again a member of the Massachusetts House of Representatives 1838–1842. He served as delegate to the state constitutional convention in 1853.

Hale was elected as a Whig to the Twenty-ninth and Thirtieth Congresses (March 4, 1845 – March 3, 1849). He engaged in agricultural pursuits. He served as presidential elector on the Republican ticket in 1864. He died in Bridgewater, Massachusetts, August 3, 1882. He was interred in Mount Prospect Cemetery.

U.S. House of Representatives
Preceded by Henry Williams	Member of the U.S. House of Representatives from Massachusetts's 9th congressional district March 4, 1845 – March 3, 1849	Succeeded by Orin Fowler
