= Nathaniel B. Borden =

American businessman and politician

Nathaniel Briggs Borden
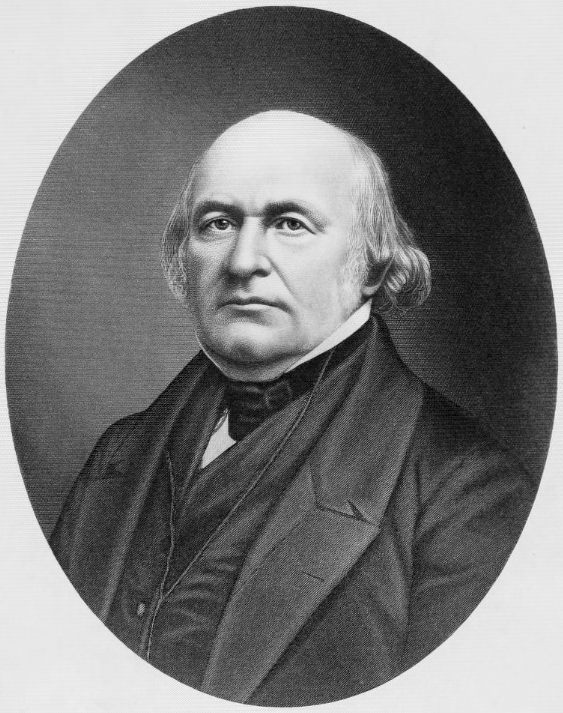

Member of the U.S. House of Representatives from Massachusetts's 10th district
- In office March 4, 1835 – March 3, 1839
- Preceded by: William Baylies
- Succeeded by: Henry Williams
- In office March 4, 1841 – March 3, 1843
- Preceded by: Henry Williams
- Succeeded by: Barker Burnell

Member of the Massachusetts Senate
- In office 1845–1848

Member of the Massachusetts House of Representatives
- In office 1831; 1834; 1851; 1854; 1864

3rd Mayor of Fall River
- In office 1856–1857

Member of the Fall River Board of Aldermen from the 2nd Ward
- In office 1859–1865

Member of the Fall River Board of Selectmen
- Preceded by: John Eddy

Personal details
- Born: April 15, 1801 Freetown, Massachusetts
- Died: April 10, 1865 (aged 63) Fall River, Massachusetts
- Resting place: Oak Grove Cemetery
- Party: Democratic (1835-1839); Whig (1841-1843)
- Spouse(s): Sarah Gray (d. May 22, 1840); Louisa G. Gray (d. June 4, 1842); Sarah Gould Buffum (d. September 10, 1854)
- Children: Simeon Borden (b. March 29, 1829; d. March 9, 1896); Nathaniel Briggs Borden, Jr. (b. February 23, 1844); Sarah (d. September 9, 1854)
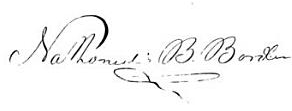
- Signature

Nathaniel Briggs Borden (April 15, 1801 – April 10, 1865) was a businessman and politician from Fall River, Massachusetts. He served as a U.S. representative from Massachusetts's 10th congressional district from 1835 to 1839 and again from 1841 to 1843. He later served as a member of the Massachusetts General Court, first as a state senator, and later a state representative. He also served as the third mayor of Fall River. His business career included interests textile mills, banking and railroads. He was the younger brother of noted land surveyor Simeon Borden.

== Early life and education ==
Nathaniel Briggs Borden was born to Simeon Borden and Amey (Briggs) Borden in the part of Freetown, Massachusetts which became Fall River in 1803. His father died in 1811. His mother Amey, was one of the original incorporators of the Troy Cotton & Woolen Manufactory, the second cotton mill to be established in Fall River, in 1813, which was built on her property. Amey Borden died in 1817, leaving five children, including sixteen-year-old Nathaniel.

Much of Borden's youth was spent in Tiverton, Rhode Island. He attended the district school and Plainfield (Connecticut) Academy, but left when his mother died. Borden acquired an interest in government at a young age. In 1821, when he was just twenty years old, Borden and several associates organized the Pocasset Manufacturing Company, in Fall River, Massachusetts. He served as the company's first clerk and treasurer.

Borden was married four times. His first marriage was to Sarah Gray on March 16, 1820. The couple had five children before Sarah died on May 22, 1840. Their eldest son, Simeon served as clerk of the courts of Bristol County, Massachusetts for thirty-two years.

Borden's second marriage was to Sarah's sister Louisa Gray on December 10, 1840. She died on June 4, 1842.

Borden's third marriage was to Sarah Gould Buffum on February 12, 1843. She was the daughter of Arnold Buffum, and sister of Elizabeth Buffum Chace. She died on September 10, 1854, from Asiatic cholera, one day after their daughter died from the same disease. This marriage also produced a son, Nathaniel Briggs, born in 1844. Nathaniel Briggs Borden Jr. would later follow his father's footsteps with a career business and banking, including the Valley Falls Company, run by his uncle Samuel B. Chace, and later the Barnard Mills in Fall River, which he helped organize.

Borden's last marriage was to Lydia A. Slade on March 14, 1855.

== Political career ==
He served as member of the Massachusetts House of Representatives in 1831 and 1834 and again in 1851 and in 1864.

Borden was elected as a Jacksonian to the Twenty-fourth Congress and reelected as a Democrat to the Twenty-fifth Congress (March 4, 1835 – March 3, 1839), winning both times as the candidate of a coalition that included his district's Anti-Masonic Party. He was an unsuccessful Whig candidate for reelection to the Twenty-sixth Congress in 1838.

Borden was elected as a Whig to the Twenty-seventh Congress (March 4, 1841 – March 3, 1843). He later served as member of the Massachusetts Senate from 1845 to 1848.

In 1856, Borden was elected Mayor of Fall River, and reelected in 1857.

== Business career ==
Borden engaged in banking and served as president of the Fall River Savings Bank and of the Fall River Union Bank. He was also president of the Fall River Railroad, from 1847 to 1854, when it merged with the Old Colony Railroad.

== Death and legacy ==
Borden died in Fall River, Massachusetts, April 10, 1865, just a few days before his sixty-fourth birthday. He was interred in Oak Grove Cemetery. In 1867, the City of Fall River dedicated the N. B. Borden School on Morgan Street in his honor. In 1876, the Academy of Music Building was dedicated in his honor by his widow Lydia, and his surviving adult children.

== See also ==
- List of mayors of Fall River, Massachusetts

== Notes ==
U.S. House of Representatives
Preceded by William Baylies	Member of the U.S. House of Representatives from Massachusetts's 10th congressional district March 4, 1835 – March 3, 1839	Succeeded by Henry Williams
Preceded by Henry Williams	Member of the U.S. House of Representatives from Massachusetts's 10th congressional district March 4, 1841 – March 3, 1843	Succeeded by Barker Burnell
