= Henry Williams (Massachusetts politician) =

American politician

Member of the U.S. House of Representatives from Massachusetts
- In office March 4, 1839 – March 3, 1841
- Preceded by: Nathaniel B. Borden
- Succeeded by: Nathaniel B. Borden
- Constituency: 10th district
- In office March 4, 1843 – March 3, 1845
- Preceded by: William Soden Hastings
- Succeeded by: Artemas Hale
- Constituency: 9th district

Member of the Massachusetts State Senate
- In office 1836-1837

Member of the Massachusetts House of Representatives
- In office 1834

Personal details
- Born: November 30, 1805 Taunton, Massachusetts
- Died: May 8, 1887 (aged 81)
- Party: Democratic
- Education: Brown University

Henry Williams (November 30, 1805 – May 8, 1887) was a U.S. representative from Massachusetts. Born in Taunton, Williams attended Brown University, and studied law. He was admitted to the bar in 1829 and commenced practice in Taunton.

He served as member of the Massachusetts House of Representatives, and served in the Massachusetts State Senate.

Williams was elected as a Democrat to the Twenty-sixth Congress (March 4, 1839 – March 3, 1841). He was an unsuccessful candidate for reelection in 1840 to the Twenty-seventh Congress. He was elected to the Twenty-eighth Congress (March 4, 1843 – March 3, 1845). After retiring from elected office, he resumed the practice of law and died in Taunton on May 8, 1887. He was interred in Mount Pleasant Cemetery.

U.S. House of Representatives
Preceded by Nathaniel B. Borden	Member of the U.S. House of Representatives from Massachusetts's 10th congressional district March 4, 1839 – March 3, 1841	Succeeded by Nathaniel B. Borden
Preceded by William S. Hastings	Member of the U.S. House of Representatives from Massachusetts's 9th congressional district March 4, 1843 – March 3, 1845	Succeeded by Artemas Hale
