= Orin Fowler =

American politician

Member of the U.S. House of Representatives from Massachusetts's 9th district
- In office March 4, 1849 – September 3, 1852
- Preceded by: Artemas Hale
- Succeeded by: Edward P. Little

Personal details
- Born: July 29, 1791 Lebanon, Connecticut
- Died: September 3, 1852 (aged 61) Washington, D.C.
- Profession: minister

Orin Fowler (July 29, 1791 – September 3, 1852) was a U.S. representative and anti-smoking activist from Massachusetts.

== Biography ==
Born in Lebanon, Connecticut, Fowler pursued classical studies and attended Williams College, Williamstown, Massachusetts. He graduated from Yale College in 1814. He studied theology and pursued extensive missionary work in the Valley of the Mississippi. Finally settled as a minister in Plainfield, Connecticut, in 1820. He moved to Fall River, Massachusetts, in 1829, where he was installed as pastor of the Congregational Church in 1831. Wrote a history of Fall River in 1841. He served in the State senate in 1848.

Fowler was elected as a Whig to the Thirty-first and Thirty-second Congresses and served from March 4, 1849, until his death in Washington, D.C., September 3, 1852. He was interred in the North Burial Ground, Fall River, Massachusetts. The former Fowler School in Fall River was named in his honor; it closed and was consolidated into the Vivieros School in the early 2000s.

== Anti-smoking ==
Fowler was a leading opponent of tobacco-smoking. In 1842, he authored A Disquisition on the Evils of Using Tobacco.

== Selected publications ==
- A Disquisition on the Evils of Using Tobacco (1842)
- History of Fall River: With notices of Freetown and Tiverton (1862)

== See also ==
- List of members of the United States Congress who died in office (1790–1899)

U.S. House of Representatives
Preceded by Artemas Hale	Member of the U.S. House of Representatives from Massachusetts's 9th congressional district March 4, 1849 – September 3, 1852	Succeeded by Edward P. Little
