= William Soden Hastings =

American politician

Member of the U.S. House of Representatives from Massachusetts's 9th district
- In office March 4, 1837 – June 17, 1842
- Preceded by: William Jackson
- Succeeded by: Henry Williams

Personal details
- Born: June 3, 1798 Mendon, Massachusetts
- Died: June 17, 1842 (aged 44) Red Sulphur Springs, Virginia (now West Virginia)
- Party: Whig
- Education: Harvard University
- Occupation: Lawyer

William Soden Hastings (June 3, 1798 – June 17, 1842) was a United States representative from Massachusetts.

== Life and career ==
Born in Mendon, Massachusetts, his father was Seth Hastings, also a U.S. Representative. On his father's side of the family, he was a descendant of Thomas Hastings (colonist) who came from the East Anglia region of England to the Massachusetts Bay Colony in 1634. The younger Hastings completed preparatory studies and graduated from Harvard University in 1817; he studied law, was admitted to the bar in 1820 and commenced practice in Mendon.

Hastings became a member of the Massachusetts House of Representatives in 1828, and served in the Massachusetts State Senate from 1829 to 1833. He was elected as a Whig to the Twenty-fifth, Twenty-sixth, and Twenty-seventh Congresses, serving from March 4, 1837, until his death in 1842. He died in Red Sulphur Springs, Virginia (now West Virginia) and was buried in Old Cemetery, Mendon.

== See also ==
- List of members of the United States Congress who died in office (1790–1899)

U.S. House of Representatives
Preceded by William Jackson	Member of the U.S. House of Representatives from Massachusetts's 9th congressional district 1837–1842	Succeeded by Henry Williams
