= Maine's 4th congressional district =

Former U.S. congressional district

- Obsolete district
- Created: 1821; 1885
- Eliminated: 1883; 1933
- Years active: 1821-1883; 1885-1933

Maine's 4th congressional district was a congressional district in Maine. It was created in 1821 after Maine achieved statehood in 1820 due to the result of the ratification of the Missouri Compromise. It was eliminated in 1933 after the 1930 U.S. census. Its last congressman was Donald F. Snow.

== List of members representing the district ==
Member	Party	Years ↑	Cong ress	Electoral history	District location
District created March 4, 1821
William D. Williamson (Bangor)	Democratic-Republican	March 4, 1821 – March 3, 1823	17th	Redistricted from the Massachusetts's 18th district and re-elected in 1821. Redistricted to the 7th district and lost re-election.	1821 – 1823; Hancock, Penobscot, and Washington counties
Joshua Cushman (Winslow)	Democratic-Republican	March 4, 1823 – March 3, 1825	18th	Redistricted from the 6th district and re-elected in 1823 on the second ballot. Lost re-election.	1823 – 1833; Kennebec and Lincoln counties
Peleg Sprague (Hallowell)	Anti-Jacksonian	March 4, 1825 – March 3, 1829	19th 20th	Elected in 1825 on the third ballot. Re-elected in 1826. Re-elected in 1828 but resigned when elected U.S. Senator.	1823 – 1833; Kennebec and Lincoln counties
Vacant		March 4, 1829 – July 20, 1829	21st		1823 – 1833; Kennebec and Lincoln counties
George Evans (Gardiner)	Anti-Jacksonian	July 20, 1829 – March 3, 1837	21st 22nd 23rd 24th 25th 26th	Elected July 20, 1829 to finish Sprague's term and seated December 7, 1829. Re-elected in 1830. Re-elected in 1833. Re-elected in 1834. Re-elected in 1836. Re-elected in 1838. Re-elected in 1840 but resigned when elected U.S. Senator.	1823 – 1833; Kennebec and Lincoln counties
George Evans (Gardiner)	Anti-Jacksonian	July 20, 1829 – March 3, 1837	21st 22nd 23rd 24th 25th 26th	Elected July 20, 1829 to finish Sprague's term and seated December 7, 1829. Re-elected in 1830. Re-elected in 1833. Re-elected in 1834. Re-elected in 1836. Re-elected in 1838. Re-elected in 1840 but resigned when elected U.S. Senator.	1833 – 1843 [data missing]
George Evans (Gardiner)	Whig	March 4, 1837 – March 3, 1841	21st 22nd 23rd 24th 25th 26th	Elected July 20, 1829 to finish Sprague's term and seated December 7, 1829. Re-elected in 1830. Re-elected in 1833. Re-elected in 1834. Re-elected in 1836. Re-elected in 1838. Re-elected in 1840 but resigned when elected U.S. Senator.	1833 – 1843 [data missing]
Vacant		March 4, 1841 – May 31, 1841	27th		1833 – 1843 [data missing]
David Bronson (Anson)	Whig	May 31, 1841 – March 3, 1843	27th	Elected to finish Evans's term. Retired.	1833 – 1843 [data missing]
Freeman H. Morse (Bath)	Whig	March 4, 1843 – March 3, 1845	28th	Elected in 1843. Retired.	1843 – 1853 [data missing]
John D. McCrate (Wiscasset)	Democratic-States Rights	March 4, 1845 – March 3, 1847	29th	Elected in 1844. Retired.	1843 – 1853 [data missing]
Franklin Clark (Wiscasset)	Democratic	March 4, 1847 – March 3, 1849	30th	Elected in 1846. Retired.	1843 – 1853 [data missing]
Rufus K. Goodenow (Paris)	Whig	March 4, 1849 – March 3, 1851	31st	Elected in 1848. Retired.	1843 – 1853 [data missing]
Charles Andrews (Paris)	Democratic	March 4, 1851 – April 30, 1852	32nd	Elected in 1850. Died.	1843 – 1853 [data missing]
Vacant		April 30, 1852 – June 25, 1852	32nd		1843 – 1853 [data missing]
Isaac Reed (Waldoboro)	Whig	June 25, 1852 – March 3, 1853	32nd	Elected to finish Andrews's term. Retired.	1843 – 1853 [data missing]
Samuel P. Benson (Winthrop)	Whig	March 4, 1853 – March 3, 1855	33rd	Elected in 1852. Re-elected in 1854. Retired.	1843 – 1853 [data missing]
Samuel P. Benson (Winthrop)	Opposition	March 4, 1855 – March 3, 1857	34th	Elected in 1852. Re-elected in 1854. Retired.	1843 – 1853 [data missing]
Freeman H. Morse (Bath)	Republican	March 4, 1857 – March 3, 1861	35th 36th	Elected in 1856. Re-elected in 1858. Retired.	1843 – 1853 [data missing]
Anson P. Morrill (Readfield)	Republican	March 4, 1861 – March 3, 1863	37th	Elected in 1860. Retired.	1843 – 1853 [data missing]
John H. Rice (Foxcroft)	Republican	March 4, 1863 – March 3, 1867	38th 39th	Redistricted from the 5th district and re-elected in 1862. Re-elected in 1864. Retired.	1863 – 1873 [data missing]
John A. Peters (Bangor)	Republican	March 4, 1867 – March 3, 1873	40th 41st 42nd	Elected in 1866. Re-elected in 1868. Re-elected in 1870. Retired.	1863 – 1873 [data missing]
Samuel F. Hersey (Bangor)	Republican	March 4, 1873 – February 3, 1875	43rd	Elected in 1872. Re-elected in 1874 but died before next term.	1873 – 1883 [data missing]
Vacant		February 3, 1875 – September 13, 1875	43rd 44th		1873 – 1883 [data missing]
Harris M. Plaisted (Bangor)	Republican	September 13, 1875 – March 3, 1877	44th	Elected to finish Hersey's term. Retired.	1873 – 1883 [data missing]
Llewellyn Powers (Houlton)	Republican	March 4, 1877 – March 3, 1879	45th	Elected in 1876. Lost re-election.	1873 – 1883 [data missing]
George Washington Ladd (Bangor)	Greenback	March 4, 1879 – March 3, 1883	46th 47th	Elected in 1878. Re-elected in 1880. Redistricted to the at-large district and lost re-election.	1873 – 1883 [data missing]
Inactive		March 3, 1883 – March 4, 1885	48th	At-large districts used	
Charles A. Boutelle (Bangor)	Republican	March 4, 1885 – March 3, 1901	49th 50th 51st 52nd 53rd 54th 55th 56th	Redistricted from the at-large district and re-elected in 1884. Re-elected in 1886. Re-elected in 1888. Re-elected in 1890. Re-elected in 1892. Re-elected in 1894. Re-elected in 1896. Re-elected in 1898. Re-elected in 1900 but resigned before next term.	1885 – 1893 [data missing]
Charles A. Boutelle (Bangor)	Republican	March 4, 1885 – March 3, 1901	49th 50th 51st 52nd 53rd 54th 55th 56th	Redistricted from the at-large district and re-elected in 1884. Re-elected in 1886. Re-elected in 1888. Re-elected in 1890. Re-elected in 1892. Re-elected in 1894. Re-elected in 1896. Re-elected in 1898. Re-elected in 1900 but resigned before next term.	1893 – 1903 [data missing]
Vacant		March 4, 1901 – April 8, 1901	57th		1893 – 1903 [data missing]
Llewellyn Powers (Houlton)	Republican	April 8, 1901 – July 28, 1908	57th 58th 59th 60th	Elected to finish Boutelle's term. Re-elected in 1902. Re-elected in 1904. Re-elected in 1906. Died.	1893 – 1903 [data missing]
Llewellyn Powers (Houlton)	Republican	April 8, 1901 – July 28, 1908	57th 58th 59th 60th	Elected to finish Boutelle's term. Re-elected in 1902. Re-elected in 1904. Re-elected in 1906. Died.	1903 – 1913 [data missing]
Vacant		July 28, 1908 – November 3, 1908	60th		1903 – 1913 [data missing]
Frank E. Guernsey (Dover)	Republican	November 3, 1908 – March 3, 1917	60th 61st 62nd 63rd 64th	Elected to finish Powers's term. Also elected to the next full term. Re-elected in 1910. Re-elected in 1912. Re-elected in 1914. Retired to run for U.S. senator.	1903 – 1913 [data missing]
Frank E. Guernsey (Dover)	Republican	November 3, 1908 – March 3, 1917	60th 61st 62nd 63rd 64th	Elected to finish Powers's term. Also elected to the next full term. Re-elected in 1910. Re-elected in 1912. Re-elected in 1914. Retired to run for U.S. senator.	1913 – 1923 [data missing]
Ira G. Hersey (Houlton)	Republican	March 4, 1917 – March 3, 1929	65th 66th 67th 68th 69th 70th	Elected in 1916. Re-elected in 1918. Re-elected in 1920. Re-elected in 1922. Re-elected in 1924. Re-elected in 1926. Lost renomination.	1913 – 1923 [data missing]
Ira G. Hersey (Houlton)	Republican	March 4, 1917 – March 3, 1929	65th 66th 67th 68th 69th 70th	Elected in 1916. Re-elected in 1918. Re-elected in 1920. Re-elected in 1922. Re-elected in 1924. Re-elected in 1926. Lost renomination.	1923 – 1933 [data missing]
Donald F. Snow (Bangor)	Republican	March 4, 1929 – March 3, 1933	71st 72nd	Elected in 1928. Re-elected in 1930. Redistricted to the 3rd district and lost renomination.	1923 – 1933 [data missing]
District eliminated March 3, 1933
