= Alexander De Witt =

American politician

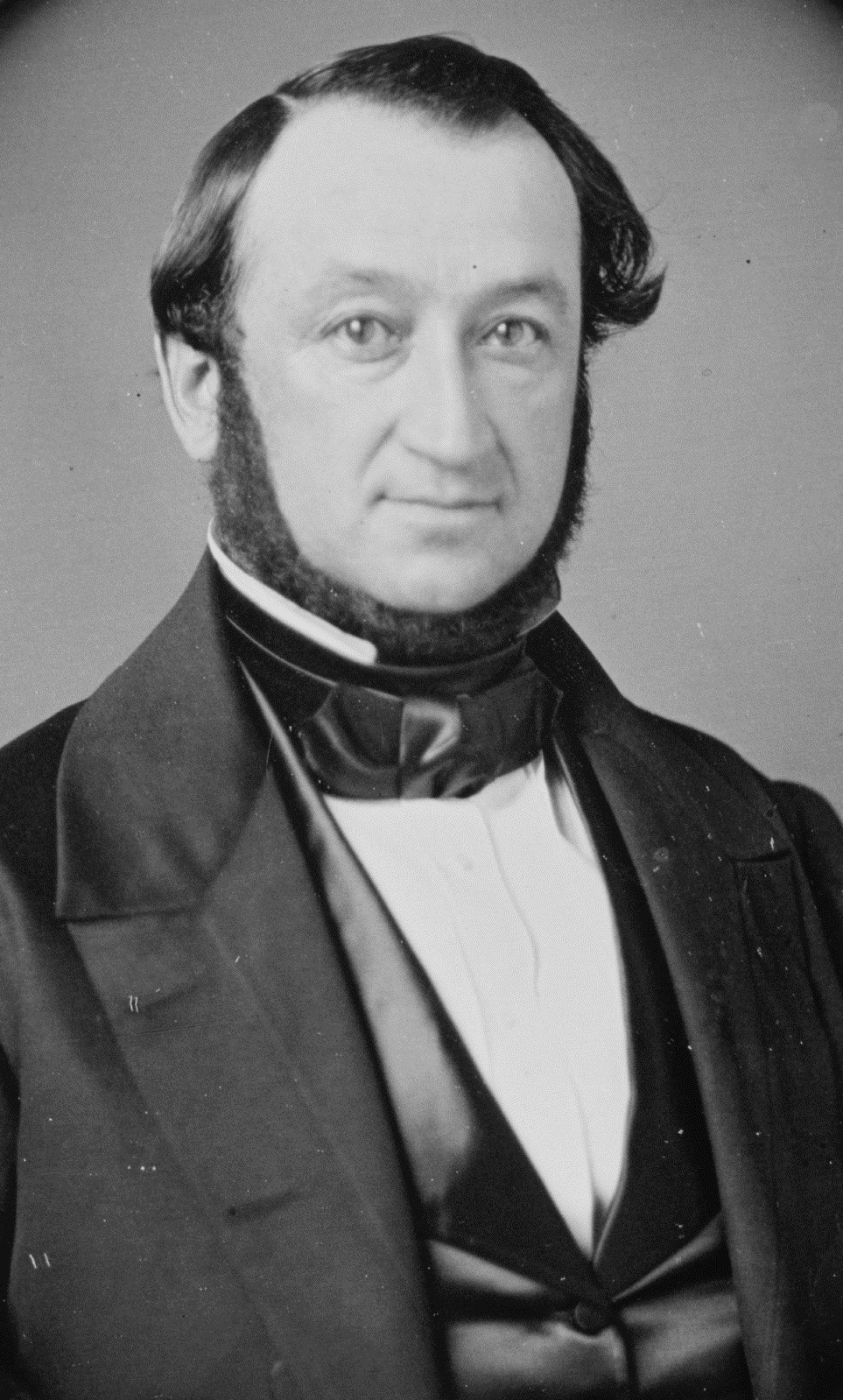
- From the Clara Barton Papers in the Library of Congress Prints and Photographs Division. Circa 1855.

Member of the U.S. House of Representatives from Massachusetts's 9th district
- In office March 4, 1853 – March 3, 1857
- Preceded by: Edward P. Little
- Succeeded by: Eli Thayer

Member of the Massachusetts Senate
- In office 1842; 1844; 1850; 1851

Member of the Massachusetts House of Representatives
- In office 1830–1836

Personal details
- Born: April 2, 1798 New Braintree, Massachusetts
- Died: January 13, 1879 (aged 80) Oxford, Massachusetts
- Party: Democratic; Free-Soil; American Party; Republican Party

Alexander De Witt (April 2, 1798 – January 13, 1879) was a 19th-century American politician from the state of Massachusetts.

Born in New Braintree, Massachusetts, De Witt worked in textile manufacturing in Oxford, Massachusetts. Active in politics as a Democrat, he was elected to the Massachusetts House of Representatives in 1830, serving until 1836. He served in the Massachusetts State Senate in 1842, 1844, 1850, and 1851.

An anti-slavery activist, De Witt later joined the Free Soil Party. As a Free Soiler he was elected to the United States Congress in 1853. In January 1854, he was one of six signatories of the "Appeal of the Independent Democrats", drafted to oppose the Kansas-Nebraska Act.

After the demise of the Free Soil Party, De Witt joined the American Party, then the only major party with an anti-slavery platform. He won a second term in 1854, and served in the 34th Congress.

He was defeated in his 1856 bid for reelection and returned to his previous work as a textile manufacturer. De Witt later became a Republican, and supported the Union during the American Civil War by participating in efforts to recruit and equip soldiers for Massachusetts regiments.

De Witt died in Oxford on January 13, 1879. He is buried in Oxford's South Cemetery.

U.S. House of Representatives
Preceded by Edward P. Little	Member of the U.S. House of Representatives from Massachusetts's 9th congressional district March 4, 1853 – March 3, 1857	Succeeded by Eli Thayer
