= Samuel P. Benson =

American politician

Samuel Page Benson
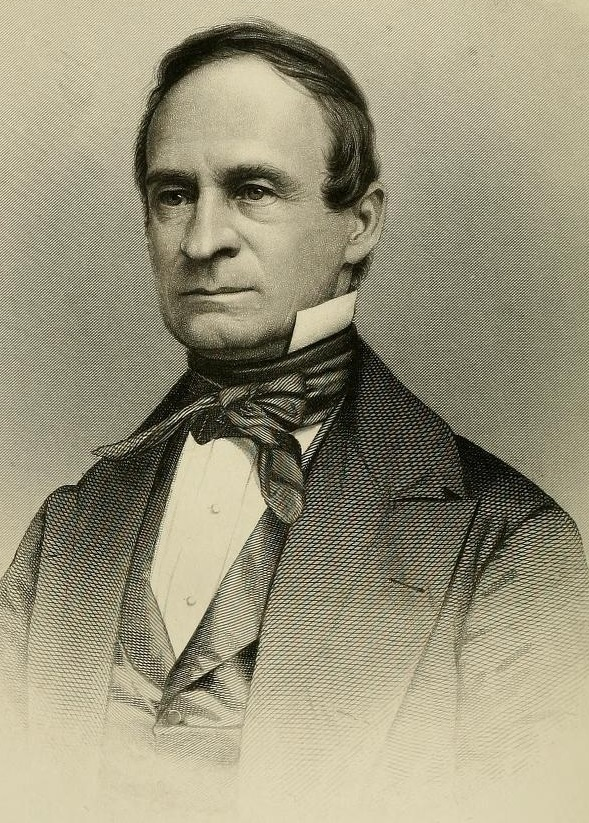
- From 1882's "History of Bowdoin College" by Cleaveland and Packard.

Member of U.S. House of Representatives from Maine's 4th district
- In office March 4, 1853 – March 3, 1857
- Preceded by: Isaac Reed
- Succeeded by: Freeman H. Morse

6th Secretary of State of Maine
- In office 1838–1838
- Governor: Edward Kent
- Preceded by: Asaph R. Nichols
- Succeeded by: Asaph R. Nichols

9th Secretary of State of Maine
- In office 1839–1839
- Governor: John Fairfield
- Preceded by: Philip C. Johnson
- Succeeded by: Philip C. Johnson

Member of the Maine Senate
- In office 1836–1837

Member of the Maine House of Representatives
- In office 1833–1834

Personal details
- Born: November 28, 1804 Winthrop, Massachusetts (now Maine)
- Died: August 12, 1876 (aged 71) Yarmouth, Maine
- Party: Whig
- Other political affiliations: Republican
- Education: Bowdoin College, 1825

Samuel Page Benson (November 28, 1804 – August 12, 1876) was a United States representative from Maine. He was born to Peleg and Sally Benson in Winthrop, Massachusetts (now in Maine) on November 28, 1804. He received instruction from private teachers and attended the Monmouth Academy of Maine. He graduated from Bowdoin College in 1825. He studied law, was admitted to the bar and commenced practice in Unity. He returned to Winthrop and practiced law until 1850.

He was a railroad builder, and was secretary of the Androscoggin & Kennebec Railroad (later the Maine Central Railroad). Benson was elected member of the Maine House of Representatives, and served in the Maine State Senate. He was elected Maine Secretary of State in 1838 and in 1841. He was an overseer of Bowdoin College from 1838 to 1876 and president of the board for sixteen years. He served as chairman of the Winthop board of selectmen from 1844 to 1848. Benson was elected as a Whig to the (Thirty-third Congress) and as a Republican member to the Thirty-fourth Congress (March 4, 1853 – March 3, 1857). He was chairman of the Committee on Naval Affairs (Thirty-fourth Congress).

He was not a candidate for reelection in 1856. Benson resumed the practice of law, and died in Yarmouth on August 12, 1876. His interment in Maple Cemetery in Winthrop.

U.S. House of Representatives
| Preceded by Isaac Reed | Member of the U.S. House of Representatives from Maine's 4th congressional district March 4, 1853 – March 3, 1857 | Succeeded by Freeman H. Morse |
Political offices
| Preceded by Asaph R. Nichols | 6th Secretary of State of Maine; 1838–1838 | Succeeded by Asaph R. Nichols |
| Preceded by Philip C. Johnson | 9th Secretary of State of Maine; 1841–1841 | Succeeded by Philip C. Johnson |
