= John D. McCrate =

American politician (1802–1879)

John Dennis McCrate

Member of the U.S. House of Representatives from Maine's 4th district
- In office March 4, 1845 – March 3, 1847
- Preceded by: Freeman H. Morse
- Succeeded by: Franklin Clark

Member of the Maine House of Representatives

Personal details
- Born: October 1, 1802 Wiscasset, Massachusetts (now Maine)
- Died: September 11, 1879 (aged 76) Sutton, Massachusetts
- Party: Democratic-States Rights

John Dennis McCrate (October 1, 1802 – September 11, 1879) was a United States representative from Maine. He was born in Wiscasset, Massachusetts (now in Maine) on October 1, 1802. McCrate graduated from Bowdoin College in 1819. He studied law, was admitted to the bar and practiced in Damariscotta and in Wiscasset.

McCrate was elected a member of the Maine House of Representatives. McCrate was elected as a Democrat to the Twenty-ninth Congress (March 4, 1845 – March 3, 1847). He resumed the practice of law in Wiscasset before moving to Boston, Massachusetts, continuing the practice of his profession until 1852 when he moved to Sutton, Massachusetts and engaged in agricultural pursuits.

== Death and burial ==
McCrate died in Sutton, Massachusetts on September 11, 1879, and was interred in Ancient Cemetery in Wiscasset.

U.S. House of Representatives
Preceded by Freeman H. Morse	Member of the U.S. House of Representatives from Maine's 4th congressional district March 4, 1845 – March 3, 1847 (obsolete district)	Succeeded by Franklin Clark
