= Freeman H. Morse =

American politician

Freeman Harlow Morse
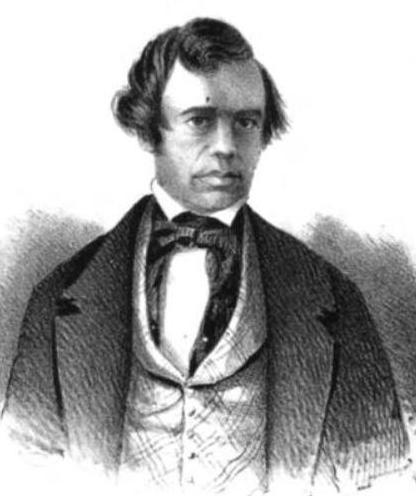

Member of the U.S. House of Representatives from Maine's 4th district
- In office March 4, 1857 – March 3, 1861
- Preceded by: Samuel P. Benson
- Succeeded by: Anson P. Morrill

Member of the U.S. House of Representatives from Maine's 4th district
- In office March 4, 1843 – March 3, 1845
- Preceded by: David Bronson
- Succeeded by: John D. McCrate

Member of the Maine House of Representatives

Mayor of Bath, Maine

United States Consul in London

Personal details
- Born: February 18, 1807 Bath, Massachusetts, U.S. (now Maine)
- Died: February 5, 1891 (aged 83) Surbiton, Surrey, England, U.K.
- Resting place: St. Mary’s churchyard, Long Ditton, England.
- Party: Whig
- Other political affiliations: Republican

Freeman Harlow Morse (February 18, 1807 – February 5, 1891) was a United States representative from Maine.

== Early life and education ==
He was born in Bath, Massachusetts (now in Maine) on February 18, 1807. He attended private schools and the academy in Bath. He engaged in business as a carver of figureheads for ships.

== Early political career ==
Morse was elected a member of the Maine House of Representatives. He was elected as a Whig to the Twenty-eighth Congress (March 4, 1843 – March 3, 1845). Morse was elected Mayor of Bath, Maine.

== Congressional career ==
Morse was elected as a Republican to the Thirty-fifth and Thirty-sixth Congresses (March 4, 1857 – March 3, 1861). Morse was Chairman of the Committee on Naval Affairs (Thirty-sixth Congress). He was not a candidate for renomination.

== Diplomatic career ==
Morse was a delegate to the Peace Convention held in Washington, D.C. in 1861, in an effort to devise means to prevent the impending war. He was appointed by President Abraham Lincoln as United States consul in London March 22, 1861, and Consul General April 16, 1869. He resided in England after his retirement from office.

== Death and burial ==
Morse died in Surbiton, Surrey, England, U.K. on February 5, 1891. His interment was in the parish churchyard of St. Mary’s in Long Ditton, England.

== See also ==
- List of mayors of Bath, Maine

Party political offices
Preceded by Edward Robinson	Whig nominee for Governor of Maine; 1845	Succeeded by David Bronson
U.S. House of Representatives
Preceded by David Bronson	Member of the U.S. House of Representatives from Maine's 4th congressional district March 4, 1843 – March 3, 1845 (obsolete district)	Succeeded by John D. McCrate
Preceded by Samuel P. Benson	Member of the U.S. House of Representatives from Maine's 4th congressional district March 4, 1857 – March 3, 1861 (obsolete district)	Succeeded by Anson P. Morrill
Diplomatic posts
Preceded by	United States Consul in London; March 22, 1861–April 16, 1869	Succeeded by
