= Anson Morrill =

American politician (1803–1887)

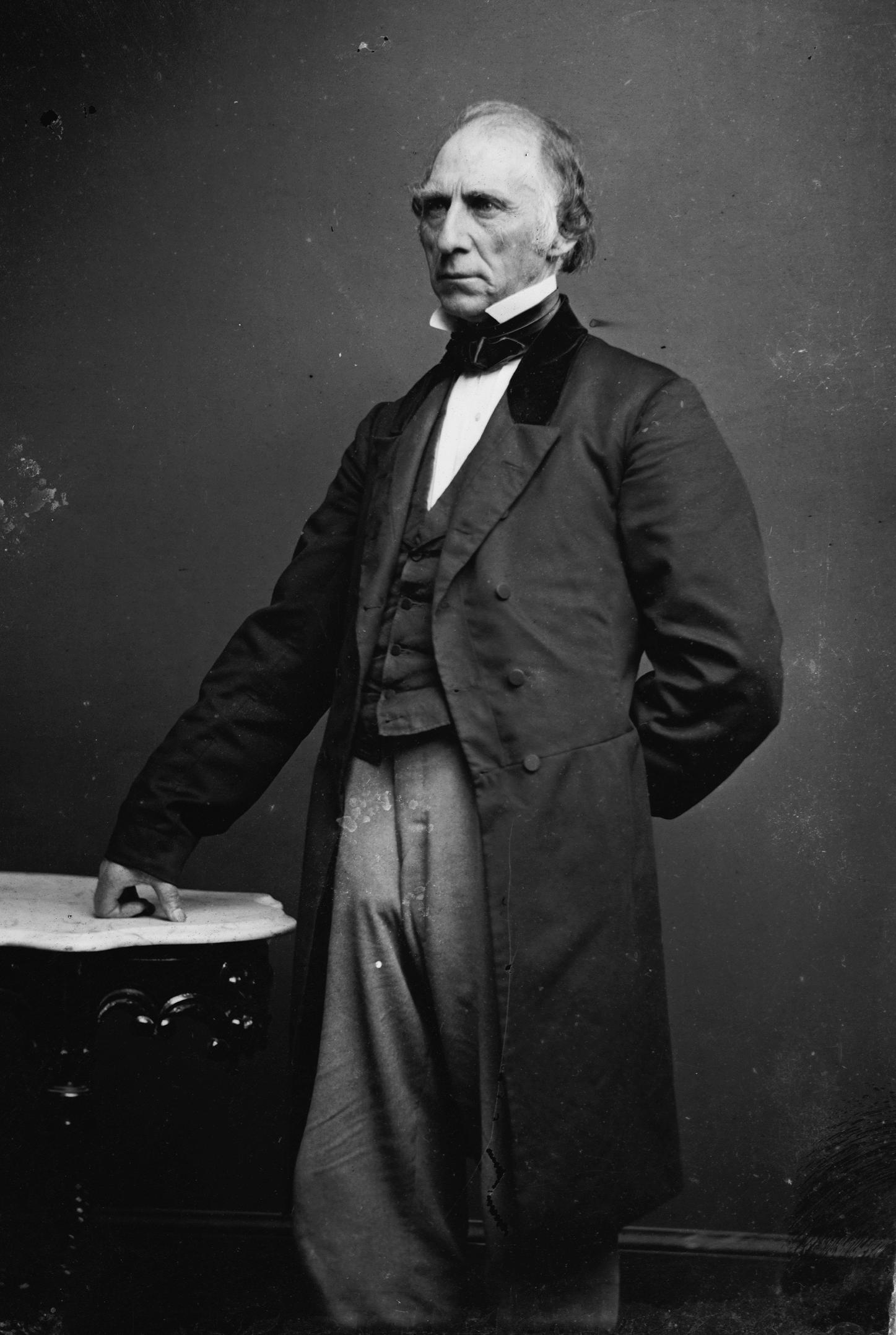
- Morrill, c. 1860–1865

Member of the U.S. House of Representatives from Maine's 4th district
- In office March 4, 1861 – March 3, 1863
- Preceded by: Freeman H. Morse
- Succeeded by: John H. Rice

24th Governor of Maine
- In office January 3, 1855 – January 2, 1856
- Preceded by: William G. Crosby
- Succeeded by: Samuel Wells

Personal details
- Born: Anson Peaslee Morrill; June 10, 1803 Belgrade, Massachusetts (now Maine)
- Died: July 4, 1887 (aged 84) Augusta, Maine
- Party: Republican
- Relatives: Lot M. Morrill (brother)

Anson Peaslee Morrill (June 10, 1803 – July 4, 1887) was an American politician who served as the 24th governor of Maine from 1855 to 1856 and later as the U.S. representative from Maine's 4th congressional district from 1861 to 1863.

== Biography ==
Morrill was born in 1803 in Belgrade (in modern-day Maine, then a part of Massachusetts). In his early years, Morrill served as the Postmaster of Dearborn and ran a general store. He was elected to the Maine House of Representatives in 1833 from Belgrade. He served as Cumberland County Sheriff in 1839, and was subsequently elected the State House from Madison in 1844. In 1850, Morrill was appointed State Land Agent, and served until 1854.

Though Morrill was a Democrat, he emerged as the Maine Law candidate for governor in 1853. In that year's gubernatorial election, Morrill placed third, winning 13% of the vote to Democrat Albert Pillsbury's 44% and incumbent Whig Governor William Crosby’s 32%. No candidate received a majority of the vote, which threw the election to the state legislature. Though the governing coalition of Whigs, Free Soilers, and anti-Maine Law Democrats originally agreed to elect Morrill as governor, the Whigs backed out—and instead re-elected Crosby as governor.

Morrill again in 1854, this time as the Know Nothing nominee, and won 49% of the vote to Albion Parris's 31% and Isaac Reed's 15%. The election was once again thrown to the legislature, which elected Morrill. He ran for re-election in 1855 as the nominee of the newly formed Republican Party, but though he won 47% of the vote to Democrat Samuel Wells's 44%, the legislature elected Wells over Morrill.

In 1860, Morrill was elected to the United States House of Representatives from Maine's 4th congressional district. Though James G. Blaine had originally planned on running for the seat, he deferred to Morrill. In 1862, Morrill opted against seeking re-election to allow Blaine to run. After leaving Congress, he served as President of the Maine Central Railroad. He served one final term as a member of the Maine House from 1881 to 1882. In 1882, Morrill urged Blaine, his old friend, to run for Congress, but Blaine declined.

The small town of Morrill is named in honor of Anson P. Morrill.

Governor Morrill died in 1887 in Augusta, Maine and is buried at the Forest Grove Cemetery in Augusta.

Party political offices
First	Know Nothing nominee for Governor of Maine; 1854	Succeeded by None
First	Republican nominee for Governor of Maine; 1855	Succeeded by Hannibal Hamlin
Political offices
Preceded by William G. Crosby	Governor of Maine; 1855–1856	Succeeded by Samuel Wells
U.S. House of Representatives
Preceded by Freeman H. Morse	Member of the U.S. House of Representatives from Maine's 4th congressional district March 4, 1861 – March 3, 1863	Succeeded by John H. Rice
