= Franklin Clark =

American politician

Member of U.S. House of Representatives from Maine's 4th district
- In office March 4, 1847 – March 3, 1849
- Preceded by: John D. McCrate
- Succeeded by: Rufus K. Goodenow

Member of the Maine Senate
- In office 1847

Personal details
- Born: August 2, 1801 Wiscasset, Massachusetts (now Maine)
- Died: August 24, 1874 (aged 73) Brooklyn, New York
- Resting place: Green-Wood Cemetery
- Party: Democratic

Franklin Clark (August 2, 1801 – August 24, 1874) was a United States representative from Maine. He was born in Wiscasset, Massachusetts (now in Maine) on August 2, 1801. He attended the common schools, then engaged in the lumber and shipping business there. He was elected a member of the Maine Senate in 1847. He was elected as a Democrat to the (Thirtieth Congress) (March 4, 1847 – March 3, 1849). After retiring from Congress, he reengaged in the manufacture of lumber, and died in Brooklyn, New York on August 24, 1874. His interment was in Green-Wood Cemetery, Brooklyn, Kings County, New York.

U.S. House of Representatives
| Preceded by John D. McCrate | Member of the U.S. House of Representatives from Maine's 4th congressional district March 4, 1847–March 3, 1849 (obsolete district) | Succeeded by Rufus K. Goodenow |
