= N. B. Borden School =

- U.S. National Register of Historic Places
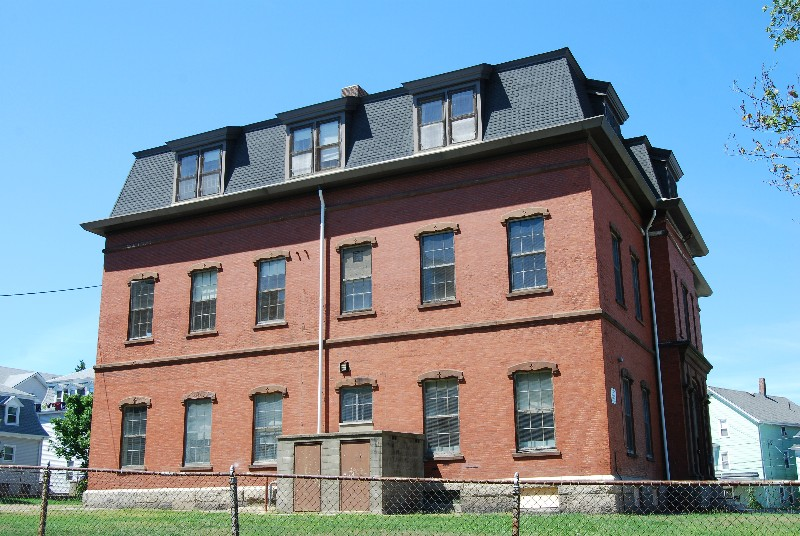

- Location within Massachusetts Location within the United States
- Location: Fall River, Massachusetts
- Coordinates: 41°41′48″N 71°09′34″W
- Built: 1867
- Architectural style: Second Empire
- MPS: Fall River MRA
- NRHP reference No.: 83000631
- Added to NRHP: February 16, 1983

The N. B. Borden School was a historic school building at 43 Morgan Street in Fall River, Massachusetts. It was a three-story red brick building with a mansard roof pierced by shed-roof dormers, and brownstone beltcourses above each level. It was built in 1867–68, during a period of growth in the city, and was used for many years as a vocational training school. It was listed on the National Register of Historic Places in 1983.

Also known as the Morgan Street School, it was named for Nathaniel B. Borden, who was the owner of the Pocasset Mills, as well as a former mayor, state representative and U.S. Representative. Borden died in 1865, and the school was named after him on its founding in 1867.

The Morgan Street School was the oldest operating school in the city when it closed in 2007. Students were transferred to the new Carlton M. Viveiros Elementary School.

In 2012, Kevin Santos, co-owner of T.A. Restaurant purchased the school from the city for $5,000 with the promise to convert the school to market rate housing. The city had turned down other, more well established developers who also bid for the property in favor of Santos.

After many years and no progress made on the school, Santos made the decision to demolish the school instead of developing into apartments in 2019. The Preservation Society of Fall River investigated and asked the Historical Commission to place a 6-month delay on the demolition. The biggest point of contention was a missing purchase & sales agreement between Santos and the city. The city was unable to find their copy of the agreement.

In August 2021, the Nathaniel B. Borden School was demolished after a long battle between the private owner, the local non-profit Preservation Society and the city's Historical Commission. The owner has since converted the site to a surface parking lot for customers of their restaurant around the corner on South Main Street.

== See also ==
- National Register of Historic Places listings in Fall River, Massachusetts
