= Massachusetts's 9th congressional district =

U.S. House district for Massachusetts

Coordinates: 41°41′42″N 70°29′07″W

- Interactive map of district boundaries since January 3, 2023
- Representative: Bill Keating; D–Bourne
- Population (2025): 796,375
- Median household income: $103,299
- Ethnicity: 83.0% White; 6.0% Hispanic; 5.3% Two or more races; 2.6% Black; 1.9% other; 1.3% Asian
- Cook PVI: D+6

Massachusetts's 9th congressional district is located in eastern Massachusetts. It is represented by Democrat Bill Keating. With a Cook Partisan Voting Index rating of D+6, it is the least Democratic district in Massachusetts, a state with an all-Democratic congressional delegation.

Redistricting after the 2010 census eliminated Massachusetts's 10th congressional district; the 9th covers much of the old 10th's eastern portion. The district also added some Plymouth County communities from the old 4th district, and some Bristol County communities from the old 3rd and 4th districts. It eliminated a few easternmost Norfolk County communities and northernmost Plymouth County communities.

From 1963 to 2013, the 9th covered most of southern Boston, and in its latter years, it included many of Boston's southern suburbs. Most of that territory is now the 8th district.

== Recent election results from statewide races ==
Year	Office	Results
2008	President	Obama 56% - 42%
2008	Senate	Kerry 61% - 39%
2010	Senate (Spec.)	Brown 59% - 41%
2010	Governor	Baker 47% - 44%
2012	President	Obama 55% - 45%
2012	Senate	Brown 53% - 47%
2014	Senate	Markey 55% - 45%
2014	Governor	Baker 54% - 41%
2016	President	Clinton 51% - 41%
2018	Senate	Warren 51% - 46%
2018	Governor	Baker 74% - 26%
2018	Secretary of the Commonwealth	Galvin 65% - 32%
2018	Attorney General	Healey 61% - 39%
2018	Treasurer and Receiver-General	Goldberg 59% - 38%
2018	Auditor	Bump 56% - 39%
2020	President	Biden 58% - 40%
2020	Senate	Markey 58% - 41%
2022	Governor	Healey 56% - 42%
2022	Secretary of the Commonwealth	Galvin 62% - 36%
2022	Attorney General	Campbell 54% - 46%
2022	Auditor	DiZoglio 48% - 44%
2024	President	Harris 54% - 44%
2024	Senate	Warren 51% - 49%

== Cities and towns in the district ==
For the 118th and successive Congresses (based on redistricting following the 2020 census), the district contains all or portions of six counties and 49 municipalities:

Barnstable County (15)

All 15 municipalities

Bristol County (6)

Acushnet, Dartmouth, Fairhaven, New Bedford, Raynham (part; also 4th), Westport

Dukes County (7)

All 7 municipalities

Nantucket County (1)

Nantucket

Norfolk County (1)

Cohasset

Plymouth County (19)

Bridgewater, Carver, Duxbury, Halifax, Hanover, Hanson, Kingston, Marion, Marshfield, Mattapoisett, Middleborough, Norwell, Pembroke, Plymouth, Plympton, Rochester, Rockland, Scituate, Wareham

== Cities and towns in the district prior to 2013 ==
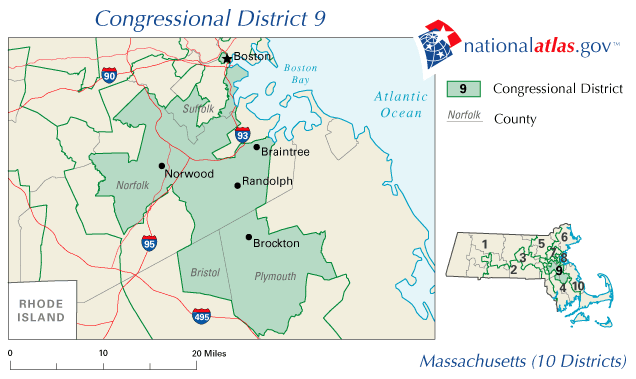
The district from 2003 to 2013

=== 1840s ===
1849: "The towns in the County of Plymouth, excepting Abington, Hingham, Hull, North Bridgewater, Rochester, and Wareham; and all the towns in the County of Bristol, excepting Dartmouth, Fairhaven, and New Bedford."

=== 1860s ===
1862: "The towns of Ashburnham, Auburn, Barre, Boylston, Brookfield, Charlton, Clinton, Douglas, Dudley, Fitchburg, Gardner, Grafton, Holden, Hubbardston, Lancaster, Leicester, Leominster, Millbury, New Braintree, North Brookfield, Oakham, Oxford, Paxton, Princeton, Rutland, Shrewsbury, Southbridge, Spencer, Sterling, Sturbridge, Sutton, Templeton, Webster, West Boylston, Westminster, and Winchendon, and the city of Worcester, in the county of Worcester."

=== 1890s ===
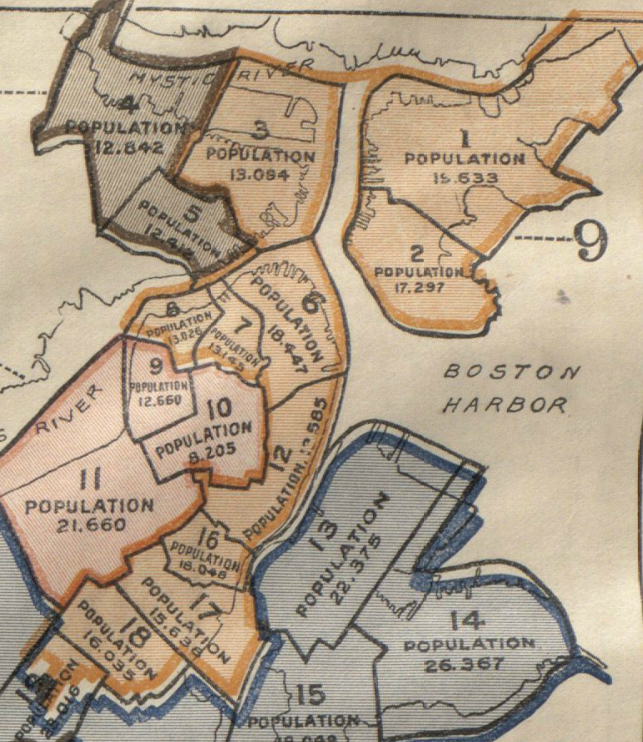
Massachusetts's 9th congressional district, 1891

1893: Boston, Wards 1, 2, 3, 6, 7, 8, 12, 16, 17, 18, 19 (Precincts 2, 3, 4, 6); Winthrop.

=== 1900s ===
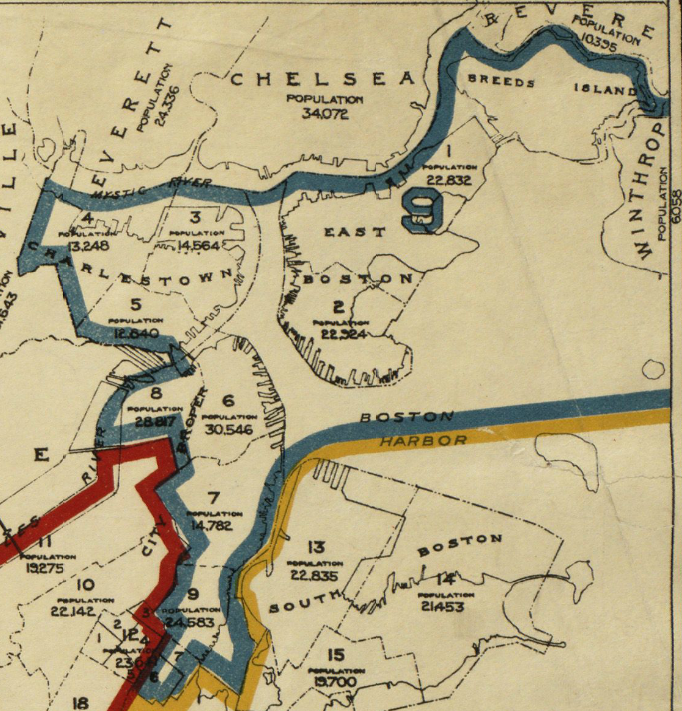
Massachusetts's 9th congressional district, 1901

=== 1910s ===
1916: In Middlesex County: Everett, Malden, Somerville. In Suffolk County: Chelsea, Revere, Winthrop.

=== 1950s ===
1953: "Counties: Barnstable, Dukes, and Nantucket. Bristol County: City of Fall River, ward 6, and city of New Bedford; towns of Acushnet, Dartmouth, Fairhaven, and Westport. Norfolk County: Town of Cohasset. Plymouth County: Towns of Abington, Bridgewater, Carver, Duxbury, East Bridgewater, Halifax, Hanover, Hanson, Hingham, Hull, Kingston, Lakeville, Marion, Marshfield, Mattapoisett, Middleborough, Norwell, Pembroke, Plymouth, Plympton, Rochester, Rockland, Scituate, Wareham, West Bridgewater, and Whitman."

=== 1960s ===
1963: Boston (Wards 4- 17, 19, 20).

=== 1970s ===
1977: "Norfolk County: Towns of Canton, Dedham, Dover, Needham, Norwood, Walpole, and Westwood. Suffolk County: City of Boston: Wards 3, 4, 6—14, 19, and 20."

=== 1980s ===
1985: "Bristol County: City of Taunton. Towns of Dighton, Easton, and Raynham. Norfolk County: Towns of Canton, Dedham, Needham, Norwood, Stoughton, and Westwood. Plymouth County: Towns of Bridgewater, Halifax, Lakeville, and Middleborough. Suffolk County: City of Boston: Wards 3, 6–14, 19, and 20."

=== 2003–2013 ===
In Bristol County:

Easton.

In Norfolk County:

Avon, Braintree, Canton, Dedham, Holbrook, Medfield, Milton, Needham, Norwood, Randolph, Stoughton, Walpole, Westwood.

In Plymouth County:

Bridgewater, Brockton, East Bridgewater, Hanson, Precincts 1 and 3, West Bridgewater, Whitman.

In Suffolk County:

Boston, Ward 3, Precincts 5 and 6; Ward 5, Precincts 3–5, 11; Ward 6; Ward 7, Precincts 1–9; Ward 13, Precincts 3, 7–10; Ward 15, Precinct 6; Ward 16, Precincts 2, 4–12; Ward 17, Precincts 4, 13, 14; Ward 18, Precincts 9–12, 16–20, 22, 23; Ward 19, Precincts 2, 7, 10–13; Ward 20.

== List of members representing the district ==
Representative	Party	Years	Cong ress	Electoral history	District location
District created March 4, 1795
Joseph B. Varnum (Dracut)	Democratic- Republican	March 4, 1795 – March 3, 1803	4th 5th 6th 7th	Elected in 1795. Re-elected in 1796. Re-elected in 1798. Re-elected in 1800. Redistricted to the 4th district.	1795 – 1803 "2nd Middle district"
Phanuel Bishop (Rehoboth)	Democratic- Republican	March 4, 1803 – March 3, 1807	8th 9th	Redistricted from the 7th district and re-elected in 1802. Re-elected in 1804. Retired.	1803 – 1815 "Bristol district"
Josiah Dean (Raynham)	Democratic- Republican	March 4, 1807 – March 3, 1809	10th	Elected in 1806. Lost re-election.	1803 – 1815 "Bristol district"
Laban Wheaton (Easton)	Federalist	March 4, 1809 – March 3, 1815	11th 12th 13th	Elected in 1808. Re-elected in 1810. Re-elected in 1812. Redistricted to the 10th district.	1803 – 1815 "Bristol district"
John Reed, Jr. (Yarmouth)	Federalist	March 4, 1815 – March 3, 1817	14th	Redistricted from the 8th district and re-elected in 1814. Lost re-election.	1815 – 1823 "Barnstable district"
Walter Folger, Jr. (Nantucket)	Democratic- Republican	March 4, 1817 – March 3, 1821	15th 16th	Elected May 1, 1817 on the third ballot. Lost re-election.	1815 – 1823 "Barnstable district"
John Reed Jr. (Yarmouth)	Federalist	March 4, 1821 – March 3, 1823	17th	Elected in 1820. Redistricted to the 13th district.	1815 – 1823 "Barnstable district"
Henry W. Dwight (Stockbridge)	Adams-Clay Federalist	March 4, 1823 – March 3, 1825	18th 19th 20th 21st	Redistricted from the 7th district and re-elected in 1822. Re-elected in 1824. Re-elected in 1827 on the second ballot. Re-elected in 1828. [data missing]	1823 – 1833 "Berkshire district"
Henry W. Dwight (Stockbridge)	Anti-Jacksonian	March 4, 1825 – March 3, 1831	18th 19th 20th 21st	Redistricted from the 7th district and re-elected in 1822. Re-elected in 1824. Re-elected in 1827 on the second ballot. Re-elected in 1828. [data missing]	1823 – 1833 "Berkshire district"
George N. Briggs (Lanesboro)	Anti-Jackson	March 4, 1831 – March 3, 1833	22nd	Elected in 1830. Redistricted to the 7th district.	1823 – 1833 "Berkshire district"
William Jackson (Newton)	Anti-Masonic	March 4, 1833 – March 3, 1837	23rd 24th	Elected in 1833. Re-elected in 1834. Retired.	1833–1843 [data missing]
William S. Hastings (Mendon)	Whig	March 4, 1837 – June 17, 1842	25th 26th 27th	Elected in 1836. Re-elected in 1838. Re-elected in 1840. Died.	1833–1843 [data missing]
Vacant		June 17, 1842 – March 3, 1843	27th		1833–1843 [data missing]
Henry Williams (Taunton)	Democratic	March 4, 1843 – March 3, 1845	28th	Elected in 1842. Retired.	1843–1853 [data missing]
Artemas Hale (Bridgewater)	Whig	March 4, 1845 – March 3, 1849	29th 30th	Elected in 1844. Re-elected in 1846. Retired.	1843–1853 [data missing]
Orin Fowler (Fall River)	Whig	March 4, 1849 – September 3, 1852	31st 32nd	Elected in 1848. Re-elected in 1850. Died.	1843–1853 [data missing]
Vacant		September 3, 1852 – December 13, 1852	32nd		1843–1853 [data missing]
Edward P. Little (Marshfield)	Democratic	December 13, 1852 – March 3, 1853	32nd	Elected to finish Fowler's term. Retired.	1843–1853 [data missing]
Alexander Dewitt (Oxford)	Free Soil	March 4, 1853 – March 3, 1855	33rd 34th	Elected in 1852. Re-elected in 1854. Lost re-election.	1853–1863 [data missing]
Alexander Dewitt (Oxford)	Know Nothing	March 4, 1855 – March 3, 1857	33rd 34th	Elected in 1852. Re-elected in 1854. Lost re-election.	1853–1863 [data missing]
Eli Thayer (Worcester)	Republican	March 4, 1857 – March 3, 1861	35th 36th	Elected in 1856. Re-elected in 1858. [data missing]	1853–1863 [data missing]
Goldsmith Bailey (Fitchburg)	Republican	March 4, 1861 – May 8, 1862	37th	Elected in 1860. Died.	1853–1863 [data missing]
Vacant		May 8, 1862 – December 1, 1862	37th		1853–1863 [data missing]
Amasa Walker (North Brookfield)	Republican	December 1, 1862 – March 3, 1863	37th	Elected to finish Bailey's term. [data missing]	1853–1863 [data missing]
William B. Washburn (Greenfield)	Republican	March 4, 1863 – December 5, 1871	38th 39th 40th 41st 42nd	Elected in 1862. Re-elected in 1864. Re-elected in 1866. Re-elected in 1868. Re-elected in 1870. Resigned to become governor of Massachusetts.	1863–1873 [data missing]
Vacant		December 5, 1871 – January 2, 1872	42nd		1863–1873 [data missing]
Alvah Crocker (Fitchburg)	Republican	January 2, 1872 – March 3, 1873	42nd	Elected to finish Washburn's term. Redistricted to the 10th district.	1863–1873 [data missing]
George Frisbie Hoar (Worcester)	Republican	March 4, 1873 – March 3, 1877	43rd 44th	Redistricted from the 8th district and re-elected in 1872. Re-elected in 1874. [data missing]	1873–1883 [data missing]
William W. Rice (Worcester)	Republican	March 4, 1877 – March 3, 1883	45th 46th 47th	Elected in 1876. Re-elected in 1878. Re-elected in 1880. [data missing]	1873–1883 [data missing]
Theodore Lyman (Brookline)	Independent; Republican	March 4, 1883 – March 3, 1885	48th	Elected in 1882. [data missing]	1883–1893 [data missing]
Frederick D. Ely (Dedham)	Republican	March 4, 1885 – March 3, 1887	49th	Elected in 1884. Lost re-election.	1883–1893 [data missing]
Edward Burnett (Southborough)	Democratic	March 4, 1887 – March 3, 1889	50th	Elected in 1886. [data missing]	1883–1893 [data missing]
John W. Candler (Worcester)	Republican	March 4, 1889 – March 3, 1891	51st	Elected in 1888. [data missing]	1883–1893 [data missing]
George F. Williams (Dedham)	Democratic	March 4, 1891 – March 3, 1893	52nd	Elected in 1890. [data missing]	1883–1893 [data missing]
Joseph H. O'Neil (Boston)	Democratic	March 4, 1893 – March 3, 1895	53rd	Elected in 1892. Lost renomination.	1893–1903 [data missing]
John F. Fitzgerald (Boston)	Democratic	March 4, 1895 – March 3, 1901	54th 55th 56th	Elected in 1894. Re-elected in 1896. Re-elected in 1898. [data missing]	1893–1903 [data missing]
Joseph A. Conry (Boston)	Democratic	March 4, 1901 – March 3, 1903	57th	Elected in 1900. [data missing]	1893–1903 [data missing]
John A. Keliher (Boston)	Democratic	March 4, 1903 – March 3, 1911	58th 59th 60th 61st	Elected in 1902. Re-elected in 1904. Re-elected in 1906. Re-elected in 1908. [data missing]	1903–1913 [data missing]
William F. Murray (Boston)	Democratic	March 4, 1911 – March 3, 1913	62nd	Elected in 1910. [data missing]	1903–1913 [data missing]
Ernest W. Roberts (Chelsea)	Republican	March 3, 1913 – March 3, 1917	63rd 64th	Elected in 1912. Re-elected in 1914. [data missing]	1913–1933 [data missing]
Alvan T. Fuller (Malden)	Republican	March 4, 1917 – January 5, 1921	65th 66th	Elected in 1916. Re-elected in 1918. Resigned after being elected Lieutenant Governor.	1913–1933 [data missing]
Vacant		January 5, 1921 – March 3, 1921	66th		1913–1933 [data missing]
Charles L. Underhill (Somerville)	Republican	March 4, 1921 – March 3, 1933	67th 68th 69th 70th 71st 72nd	Elected in 1920. Re-elected in 1922. Re-elected in 1924. Re-elected in 1926. Re-elected in 1928. Re-elected in 1930. Retired.	1913–1933 [data missing]
Robert Luce (Waltham)	Republican	March 4, 1933 – January 3, 1935	73rd	Elected in 1932. [data missing]	1933–1943 [data missing]
Richard M. Russell (Cambridge)	Democratic	January 3, 1935 – January 3, 1937	74th	Elected in 1934. [data missing]	1933–1943 [data missing]
Robert Luce (Waltham)	Republican	January 3, 1937 – January 3, 1941	75th 76th	Elected in 1936. Re-elected in 1938. [data missing]	1933–1943 [data missing]
Thomas H. Eliot (Cambridge)	Democratic	January 3, 1941 – January 3, 1943	77th	Elected in 1940. Lost renomination.	1933–1943 [data missing]
Charles L. Gifford (Cotuit)	Republican	January 3, 1943 – August 23, 1947	78th 79th 80th	Elected in 1942. Re-elected in 1944. Re-elected in 1946. Died.	1943–1953 [data missing]
Vacant		August 23, 1947 – November 18, 1947	80th		1943–1953 [data missing]
Donald W. Nicholson (Wareham)	Republican	November 18, 1947 – January 3, 1959	80th 81st 82nd 83rd 84th 85th	Elected to finish Gifford's term. Re-elected in 1948. Re-elected in 1950. Re-elected in 1952. Re-elected in 1954. Re-elected in 1956. [data missing]	1943–1953 [data missing]
Donald W. Nicholson (Wareham)	Republican	November 18, 1947 – January 3, 1959	80th 81st 82nd 83rd 84th 85th	Elected to finish Gifford's term. Re-elected in 1948. Re-elected in 1950. Re-elected in 1952. Re-elected in 1954. Re-elected in 1956. [data missing]	1953–1963 [data missing]
Hastings Keith (West Bridgewater)	Republican	January 3, 1959 – January 3, 1963	86th 87th	Elected in 1958. Re-elected in 1960. Redistricted to 12th district.	1953–1963 [data missing]
John W. McCormack (Boston)	Democratic	January 3, 1963 – January 3, 1971	88th 89th 90th 91st	Redistricted from the 12th district and re-elected in 1962. Re-elected in 1964. Re-elected in 1966. Re-elected in 1968. Retired.	1963–1973 [data missing]
Louise Day Hicks (Boston)	Democratic	January 3, 1971 – January 3, 1973	92nd	Elected in 1970. Lost re-election.	1963–1973 [data missing]
Joe Moakley (Boston)	Democratic	January 3, 1973 – May 28, 2001	93rd 94th 95th 96th 97th 98th 99th 100th 101st 102nd 103rd 104th 105th 106th 107th	Elected in 1972 as an independent, but became a Democrat at beginning of the term Re-elected in 1974. Re-elected in 1976. Re-elected in 1978. Re-elected in 1980. Re-elected in 1982. Re-elected in 1984. Re-elected in 1986. Re-elected in 1988. Re-elected in 1990. Re-elected in 1992. Re-elected in 1994. Re-elected in 1996. Re-elected in 1998. Re-elected in 2000. Announced retirement, then died.	1973–1983 [data missing]
Joe Moakley (Boston)	Democratic	January 3, 1973 – May 28, 2001	93rd 94th 95th 96th 97th 98th 99th 100th 101st 102nd 103rd 104th 105th 106th 107th	Elected in 1972 as an independent, but became a Democrat at beginning of the term Re-elected in 1974. Re-elected in 1976. Re-elected in 1978. Re-elected in 1980. Re-elected in 1982. Re-elected in 1984. Re-elected in 1986. Re-elected in 1988. Re-elected in 1990. Re-elected in 1992. Re-elected in 1994. Re-elected in 1996. Re-elected in 1998. Re-elected in 2000. Announced retirement, then died.	1983–1993 [data missing]
Joe Moakley (Boston)	Democratic	January 3, 1973 – May 28, 2001	93rd 94th 95th 96th 97th 98th 99th 100th 101st 102nd 103rd 104th 105th 106th 107th	Elected in 1972 as an independent, but became a Democrat at beginning of the term Re-elected in 1974. Re-elected in 1976. Re-elected in 1978. Re-elected in 1980. Re-elected in 1982. Re-elected in 1984. Re-elected in 1986. Re-elected in 1988. Re-elected in 1990. Re-elected in 1992. Re-elected in 1994. Re-elected in 1996. Re-elected in 1998. Re-elected in 2000. Announced retirement, then died.	1993–2003 [data missing]
Vacant		May 28, 2001 – October 15, 2001	107th		1993–2003 [data missing]
Stephen Lynch (Boston)	Democratic	October 16, 2001 – January 3, 2013	107th 108th 109th 110th 111th 112th	Elected to finish Moakley's term. Re-elected in 2002. Re-elected in 2004. Re-elected in 2006. Re-elected in 2008. Re-elected in 2010. Redistricted to the 8th district.	1993–2003 [data missing]
Stephen Lynch (Boston)	Democratic	October 16, 2001 – January 3, 2013	107th 108th 109th 110th 111th 112th	Elected to finish Moakley's term. Re-elected in 2002. Re-elected in 2004. Re-elected in 2006. Re-elected in 2008. Re-elected in 2010. Redistricted to the 8th district.	2003–2013
Bill Keating (Bourne)	Democratic	January 3, 2013 – present	113th 114th 115th 116th 117th 118th 119th	Redistricted from the 10th district and re-elected in 2012. Re-elected in 2014. Re-elected in 2016. Re-elected in 2018. Re-elected in 2020. Re-elected in 2022. Re-elected in 2024. Re-elected in 2026.	2013–2023
Bill Keating (Bourne)	Democratic	January 3, 2013 – present	113th 114th 115th 116th 117th 118th 119th	Redistricted from the 10th district and re-elected in 2012. Re-elected in 2014. Re-elected in 2016. Re-elected in 2018. Re-elected in 2020. Re-elected in 2022. Re-elected in 2024. Re-elected in 2026.	2023–present

== Election results ==
=== 2012 ===
Massachusetts's 9th congressional district, 2012
Party	Candidate	Votes	%
Democratic	Bill Keating (incumbent)	212,754	58.7
Republican	Christopher Sheldon	116,531	32.2
Independent	Daniel Botelho	32,655	9.0
n/a	Write-ins	465	0.1
Total votes		359,060	100.0
Democratic hold			

=== 2014 ===
Massachusetts's 9th congressional district, 2014
Party	Candidate	Votes	%
Democratic	Bill Keating (incumbent)	140,413	54.9
Republican	John Chapman	114,971	45.0
n/a	Write-ins	157	0.1
Total votes		255,541	100.0
Democratic hold			

=== 2016 ===
Massachusetts's 9th congressional district, 2016
Party	Candidate	Votes	%
Democratic	Bill Keating (incumbent)	211,790	55.8
Republican	Mark C. Alliegro	127,803	33.6
Independent	Paul J. Harrington	26,233	6.9
Independent	Christopher D. Cataldo	8,338	2.2
Independent	Anna Grace Raduc	5,320	1.4
n/a	Write-ins	411	0.1
Total votes		379,895	100.0
Democratic hold			

=== 2018 ===
Massachusetts' 9th congressional district, 2018
Party	Candidate	Votes	%
Democratic	Bill Keating (incumbent)	192,347	59.4
Republican	Peter Tedeschi	131,463	40.6
Write-in		118	0.0
Total votes		323,928	100.0
Democratic hold			

=== 2020 ===
Massachusetts's 9th congressional district, 2020
Party	Candidate	Votes	%
Democratic	Bill Keating (incumbent)	260,262	61.3
Republican	Helen Brady	154,261	36.3
Independent	Michael Manley	9,717	2.3
Write-in		361	0.1
Total votes		424,601	100.0
Democratic hold			

=== 2022 ===
Massachusetts's 9th congressional district, 2022
Party	Candidate	Votes	%
Democratic	Bill Keating (incumbent)	197,823	59.1
Republican	Jesse G. Brown	136,347	40.9
Write-in		150	0.0
Total votes		424,240	100.0
Democratic hold			

=== 2024 ===
2024 Massachusetts's 9th congressional district election
Party	Candidate	Votes	%
Democratic	Bill Keating (incumbent)	251,931	56.4
Republican	Dan Sullivan	193,822	43.4
Write-in		642	0.1
Total votes		446,395	100.0
Democratic hold			

U.S. House of Representatives
Preceded by Massachusetts's 12th congressional district	Home district of the speaker January 3, 1963 – January 3, 1971	Succeeded by Oklahoma's 3rd congressional district
