= Goldsmith Bailey =

American politician

Goldsmith Fox Bailey
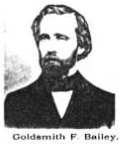

Member of the U.S. House of Representatives from Massachusetts's 9th district
- In office March 4, 1861 – May 8, 1862
- Preceded by: Eli Thayer
- Succeeded by: Amasa Walker

Member of the Fitchburg School Committee
- In office 1849–1854

Member of the Massachusetts House of Representatives
- In office 1857

Member of the Massachusetts State Senate
- In office 1858–1860

Personal details
- Born: July 17, 1823 East Westmoreland, New Hampshire, US
- Died: May 8, 1862 (aged 38) Fitchburg, Massachusetts, US
- Spouse: Sophia Bailey
- Occupation: Printer editor and publisher (up to 1848)
- Profession: Attorney (admitted to the bar in 1848)

Goldsmith Fox Bailey (July 17, 1823 – May 8, 1862) was a U.S. representative from Massachusetts.

Born in East Westmoreland, New Hampshire, when he was three years old, his widowed mother moved with him to Fitchburg.

Bailey attended the public schools of Fitchburg, Massachusetts. When he was 17 Bailey started work as an apprentice for the Bellows Falls Gazette. By 1844 Bailey became editor and publisher of the newspaper.

In 1845 Bailey began to study law, first with William C. Bradley in Westminster, Vermont, and later with the firm of Torrey and Wood in Fitchburg.

Bailey was admitted to the bar in 1848 and commenced practice in Fitchburg, Massachusetts, as a partner in the law firm of N. Wood & Co.

Bailey served on the Fitchburg, Massachusetts school committee from 1849 to 1854. He was appointed postmaster of Fitchburg on May 3, 1851, and served until May 4, 1853, when his successor was appointed. Bailey served as member of the Massachusetts house of representatives in 1857. He served in the Massachusetts State Senate 1858–60. Bailey was the Republican Party candidate for congress in Massachusetts' ninth congressional district in the 1860 election.

Bailey was elected as a Republican to the Thirty-seventh Congress and served from March 4, 1861, until his death in Fitchburg, Massachusetts, May 8, 1862. He was interred in Laurel Hill Cemetery, with a cenotaph at the Congressional Cemetery.

== See also ==
- List of members of the United States Congress who died in office (1790–1899)

U.S. House of Representatives
Preceded by Eli Thayer	Member of the U.S. House of Representatives from Massachusetts's 9th congressional district 1861–1862	Succeeded by Amasa Walker
