= Edward P. Little =

American politician

Member of the U.S. House of Representatives from Massachusetts's 9th district
- In office December 13, 1852 – March 3, 1853
- Preceded by: Orin Fowler
- Succeeded by: Alexander De Witt

Personal details
- Born: November 7, 1791 Marshfield, Massachusetts
- Died: February 6, 1875 (aged 83) Lynn, Massachusetts
- Profession: agriculture

Edward Preble Little (November 7, 1791 – February 6, 1875) was a member of the United States House of Representatives from Massachusetts. He was born in Marshfield in 1791. He attended public schools. At the age of nine (in 1800) he was on the U.S. frigate Boston with his father, Capt. George Little, at the suggestion of President John Adams, who gave him a commission as midshipman. He engaged in agricultural pursuits.

== Career ==
Little served as a member of the Massachusetts House of Representatives and was elected as a Democrat to the Thirty-second Congress to fill the vacancy caused by the death of Orin Fowler. He served from December 13, 1852, to March 3, 1853. He was not a candidate for renomination to the Thirty-third Congress, but served as collector of customs at the port of Plymouth. Edward Preble Little was named after Commodore Edward Preble. His parents were Capt. George Little (1754–1809) and Rachel (Rogers) Little (1758–1838). Edward Preble Little married Edy Rogers (1789–1852) March 13, 1811 in Marshfield, Massachusetts. Source: "John Rogers of Marshfield" 1898 by Josiah H. Drummond, pages 69 and 87.

== Agriculture ==
Little resumed agricultural pursuits, and died in Lynn, Massachusetts on February 6, 1875. His interment was in the Congregational Church Cemetery in Marshfield Hills.

U.S. House of Representatives
Preceded by Orin Fowler	Member of the U.S. House of Representatives from Massachusetts's 9th congressional district December 13, 1852 – March 3, 1853	Succeeded by Alexander Dewitt
