= Isaac Reed (politician) =

American politician (1809–1887)

Member of the U.S. House of Representatives from Maine's 4th district
- In office June 25, 1852 - March 3, 1853
- Preceded by: Charles Andrews
- Succeeded by: Samuel P. Benson

16th Maine State Treasurer
- In office 1856
- Governor: Samuel Wells
- Preceded by: Woodbury Davis
- Succeeded by: Benjamin D. Peck

Member of the Maine House of Representatives
- In office 1842-1843, 1846, 1870-1871

Member of the Maine Senate
- In office 1839-1840, 1850, 1863

Town Clerk of Waldoboro, Maine
- In office 1836-1838

Personal details
- Born: August 22, 1809 Waldoboro, Massachusetts, US (now Maine)
- Died: September 19, 1887 (aged 78) Waldoboro, Maine, US
- Resting place: Waldoboro Cemetery
- Party: Whig
- Other political affiliations: Democratic
- Profession: Merchant-ship builder, Banker

Isaac Reed (August 22, 1809 – September 19, 1887) was a United States representative from Maine.

== Biography ==
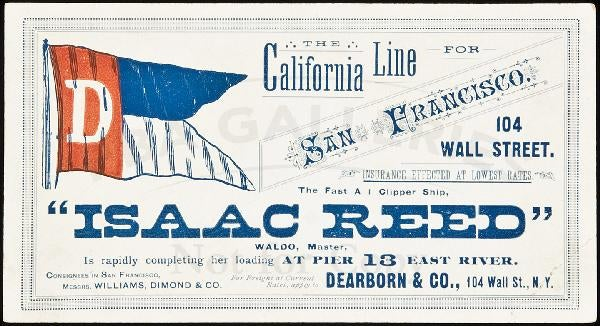
Sailing card for the clipper ship Isaac Reed

Reed was born in Waldoboro, Massachusetts (now in Maine) on August 22, 1809, and was the oldest son of Col. Isaac G. Reed. He prepared for college at Bloomfield Academy, but chose to become a merchant-ship builder, rather than attending college, and became the senior partner in the shipbuilding company of Reed, Welt and Co. He also engaged in banking as the "...president of Waldoboro State and National Bank during its entire existence of thirty-two years."

Reed was town clerk of Waldoboro from 1836 to 1838. He served in the Maine State Senate in 1839, 1840, 1850 and 1863. He was a member of the Maine House of Representatives in 1842, 1843 and 1846.

He was called as a member of the State board of agriculture and a trustee of the Maine Insane Hospital. He was an unsuccessful candidate for election in 1850 to the Thirty-second Congress, but subsequently was elected as a Whig to the Thirty-second Congress to fill the vacancy caused by the death of Charles Andrews and served from June 25, 1852, to March 3, 1853. He was an unsuccessful candidate for Governor of Maine in 1854 and 1855.

Reed resumed shipbuilding. He served as Maine State Treasurer in 1856. Upon the dissolution of the Whig Party, he became a Democrat. Reed was again elected a member of the Maine House of Representatives in 1870 and 1871.

== Reed Mansion ==
In 1811 Reed's father purchased a house under construction begun in 1808 by the congregational reverend John R. Cutting. Known at the time as "Cuttings folly" the house is now known as the Reed Mansion and is listed on the National Register of Historic Places. In this house was designed and sketched the Seal of Maine.

On April 2, 2017, the Reed Mansion was destroyed by a fire. The mansion was a complete loss.

== Death ==
Reed died in Waldoboro on September 19, 1887.

== See also ==
- Emily Reed (ship)

Party political offices
| Preceded by William G. Crosby | Whig nominee for Governor of Maine; 1854, 1855 | Succeeded by George F. Patten |
Political offices
| Preceded by Woodbury Davis | Treasurer of Maine; 1856 | Succeeded by Benjamin D. Peck |
U.S. House of Representatives
| Preceded by Charles Andrews | Member of the U.S. House of Representatives from Maine's 4th congressional district June 25, 1852 – March 3, 1853 | Succeeded by Samuel P. Benson |
