= Charles Andrews (Maine politician) =

American politician (1814–1852)

Member of the U.S. House of Representatives from Maine's 4th district
- In office March 4, 1851 – April 30, 1852
- Preceded by: Rufus K. Goodenow
- Succeeded by: Isaac Reed

Member of the Maine House of Representatives
- In office 1839–1843

Personal details
- Born: February 11, 1814 Paris, Massachusetts (now Maine)
- Died: April 30, 1852 (aged 38) Paris, Maine
- Resting place: Hillside Cemetery

Charles Andrews (February 11, 1814 – April 30, 1852) was a United States representative from Maine. He was born in Paris, Massachusetts (now in Maine) on February 11, 1814. He attended the district school and graduated from Hebron Academy.

He studied law, and was admitted to the bar in 1837. He commenced practice in Turner, Maine before returning to Paris. He was elected as a member of the Maine House of Representatives 1839–1843, serving as speaker in 1842. He became clerk of the courts for Oxford County, Maine on January 1, 1845, serving three years. He was elected as a delegate to the Democratic National Convention in Baltimore in 1848.

He was elected as a Democrat to the Thirty-second Congress and served from March 4, 1851, until his death in Paris on April 30, 1852. Interment is in Hillside Cemetery.

== See also ==
- List of members of the United States Congress who died in office (1790–1899)

U.S. House of Representatives
Preceded by Rufus K. Goodenow	Member of the U.S. House of Representatives from Maine's 4th congressional district March 4, 1851–April 30, 1852 (obsolete district)	Succeeded by Isaac Reed
