= Ruggles Park =

- U.S. National Register of Historic Places
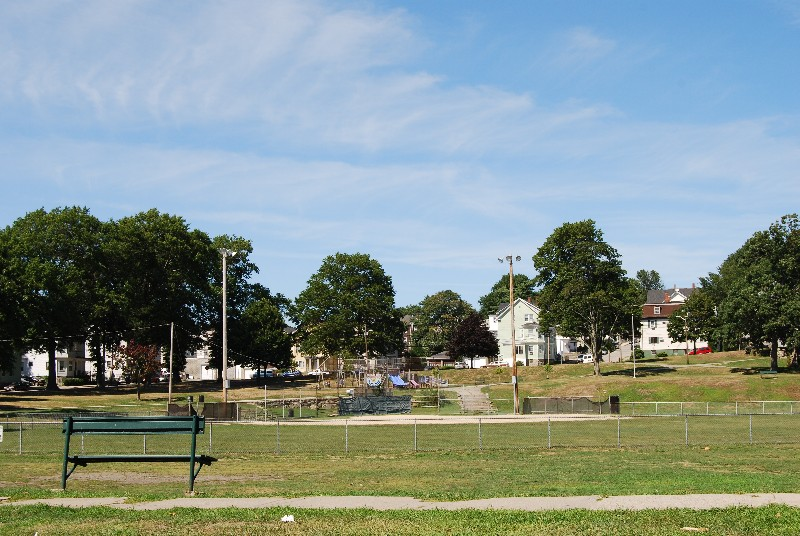

- Location within Massachusetts Location within the United States
- Location: Fall River, Massachusetts
- Coordinates: 41°42′14″N 71°8′46″W
- Area: 9 acres (3.6 ha)
- Built: 1868
- Architect: Olmsted Brothers
- MPS: Fall River MRA
- NRHP reference No.: 83000711
- Added to NRHP: February 16, 1983

Ruggles Park is a park in Fall River, Massachusetts. It covers about 9 acres within a densely populated working-class neighborhood bounded by Seabury, Robeson, Pine, and Locust Streets, just north of the Granite Mills.

The land for park was originally part of the Rodman Farm. In 1868, the city purchased 15 acres (6.1 ha) that included a fine natural plantation known as Ruggles Grove. It was redesigned in 1903 by the Olmsted Brothers.

It is one of three Olmsted parks in the city, along with Kennedy Park (originally known as South Park) and North Park (part of the Highlands Historic District).

Ruggles Park was added to the National Register of Historic Places in 1983.

== See also ==
- National Register of Historic Places listings in Fall River, Massachusetts
- List of Olmsted works
