= Queen Anne Pool =

Swimming pool in Seattle, Washington, U.S.

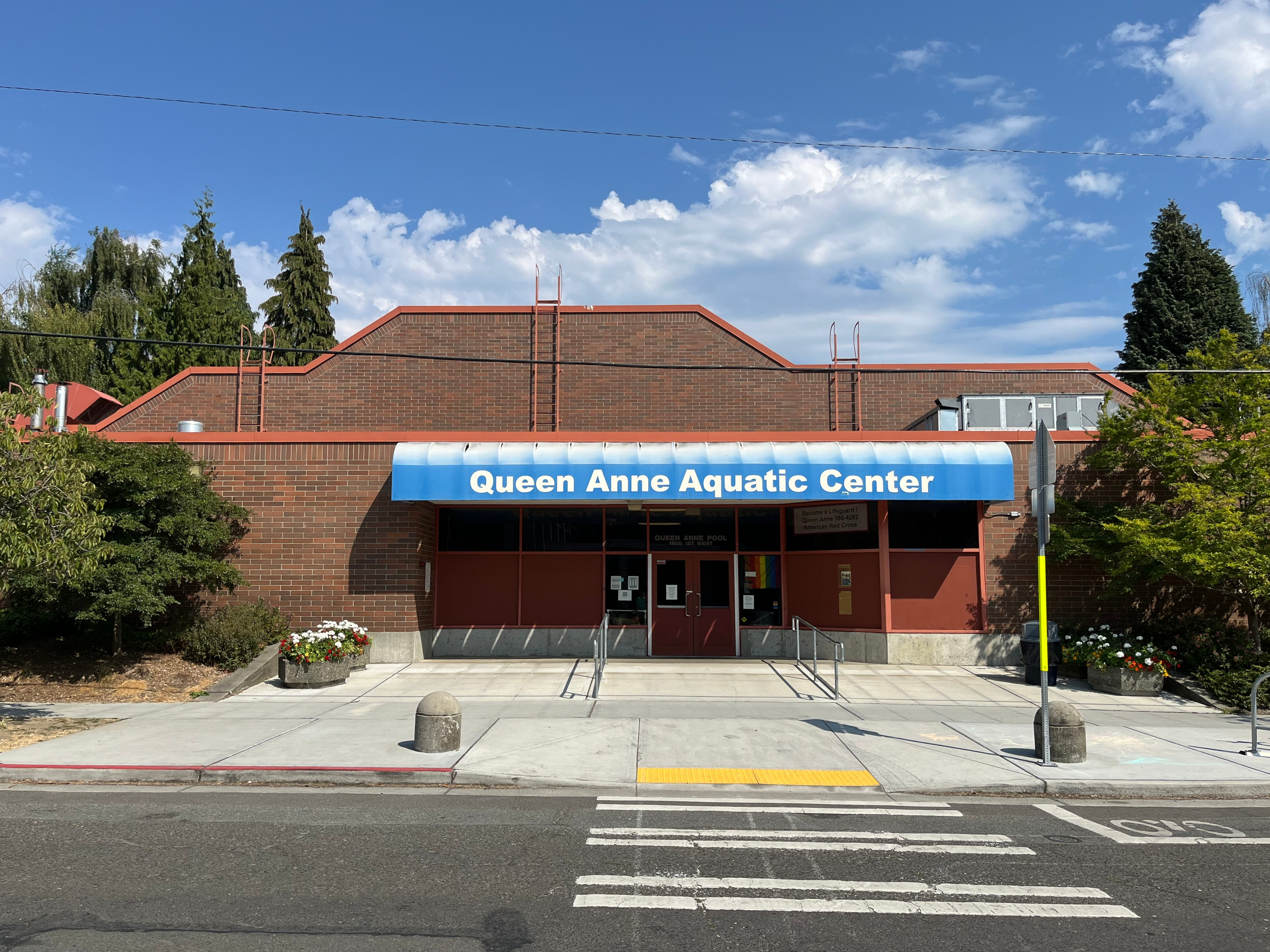
- Alternative names: Queen Anne Aquatic Center

General information
- Type: Swimming pool
- Architectural style: Modernist
- Location: 1920 1st Avenue West; Seattle, Washington, United States
- Coordinates: 47°38′11″N 122°21′28″W
- Elevation: 380 ft (120 m)
- Year built: 1974–1977
- Opened: November 10, 1977
- Inaugurated: November 21, 1977
- Cost: $843,000 (equivalent to $4,500,000 in 2023)

Technical details
- Floor count: 1

Design and construction
- Architect: Benjamin F. McAdoo

Seattle Landmark
- Designated: May 15, 2024

The Queen Anne Pool (also known as the Queen Anne Aquatic Center) is a public pool in the Queen Anne neighborhood of Seattle, Washington, United States. Funded by the Forward Thrust initiatives in 1968, the pool construction was delayed for years in deliberations over funding and location. After ten houses adjacent to the McClure Middle School were purchased by the city recreation fund, in 1974 local architect Benjamin F. McAdoo was selected to design the structure. Construction began on the site two years later; the project exceeded the construction firm's initial bid, for a total cost of $843,000 (equivalent to $4,800,000 in 2025). It was opened to the public on November 10, 1977, and dedicated by Mayor Wesley C. Uhlman eleven days later.

The pool building is T-shaped, with the pool located in the leg of the T, away from the street. It is fashioned from reinforced concrete with a brick veneer and features an asymmetrical red roof. It was designed in Modernist style, featuring trademark details in the interior such as exposed concrete wall, brickwork, and support beams. The pool itself, measuring 75 by 43 ft (23 by 13 m), features one-meter and three-meter diving platforms, a rope swing, and a pool lift. A sauna is also located within the facility.

Today, Queen Anne Pool is used for local recreational swimming, provides lessons, and hosts daily family and lap swims. In addition, the pool serves as the practice facility and home pool of the Lincoln High School boys' and girls' swim and dive teams during their respective athletic seasons.

== History ==
In 1968, King County voters approved Forward Thrust, a series of bond ballot initiatives to fund various improvements in Seattle and the surrounding King County. Park and recreation improvements in Seattle were funded by $65,000,000 (equivalent to $601,800,000 in 2025) in bonds, with almost 200 distinct recreation projects included within the program. This included a set of seven public pools: Medgar Evers Pool, Capt. William R. Ballard, Helene Madison, Rainier Beach, Meadowbrook, Sealth, and Queen Anne. The legislation specified that all of these pools were to be constructed in the vicinity of high schools.

While the Queen Anne Pool was initially planned to be among the first pools constructed under the Forward Thrust program, it was the only pool that was not completed or under construction by 1975. The pool's construction was first delayed in 1972 due to high property costs in Queen Anne and a lack of open space. No suitable pool locations were available in the area around Queen Anne High School due to a lack of open space and high property values, prompting Park Superintendent Hans Thompson to suggest a location adjacent to McClure Middle School, a proposal supported by local community organizations. This was opposed by residents in Magnolia, who advocated for a location in the Interbay neighborhood, situated between Queen Anne and Magnolia. A location on the Seattle Pacific College campus was also proposed, but rejected.

After public debate and delays from deliberations over whether the bond allowed the proposed locations, the City Council's Parks Committee chose the site adjacent to McClure in late 1973. As the bond program only funded the construction of the pool and not the resulting land acquisition, arrangements were made with the Seattle City Council and Seattle Public Schools to help fund the latter. Following an early 1973 environmental survey, ten houses situated on the site were purchased through a $325,000 (equivalent to $3,000,000 in 2025) payment by the Parks and Recreation Fund.

The Forward Thrust pools had a variety of architectural styles and influences, with others having been constructed in Brutalist and New Formalist styles. In November 1974, African-American architect Benjamin F. McAdoo, a specialist in Modernist and Northwest Regional styles, was selected to design the structure. McAdoo had previously focused on designing private residences, but had shifted towards civic commissions after returning to Seattle in 1964.

Donald Harris, of the Seattle Parks Department, was appointed the project's manager. He was later replaced in favor of Dave Buchan, adding several months of delay to the pool's construction. After bidding, Frodesen & Associates was selected as the construction firm after a low bid of $764,000 (equivalent to $5,000,000 in 2025). Frodesen & Associates began work on the site in July 1976; their costs went on to exceed their initial bid for a total cost of $843,000 (equivalent to $4,800,000 in 2025).

While the opening date was planned for November 9, 1977, it was delayed by one day after a faulty thermostat overheated the pool to 100 °F (38 °C), far exceeding the intended temperature of 84 °F (29 °C). Seattle Mayor Wesley C. Uhlman officially dedicated the pool on November 21, 1977. In August 1978, the pool was closed for over a month to be dried and dampproofed, due to humidity damaging the brickwork and turning the building white; dampproofing was only partially applied during construction. The Seattle Landmarks Preservation Board chose to designate the pool a Seattle Landmark in May 2024.

== Site and structure ==
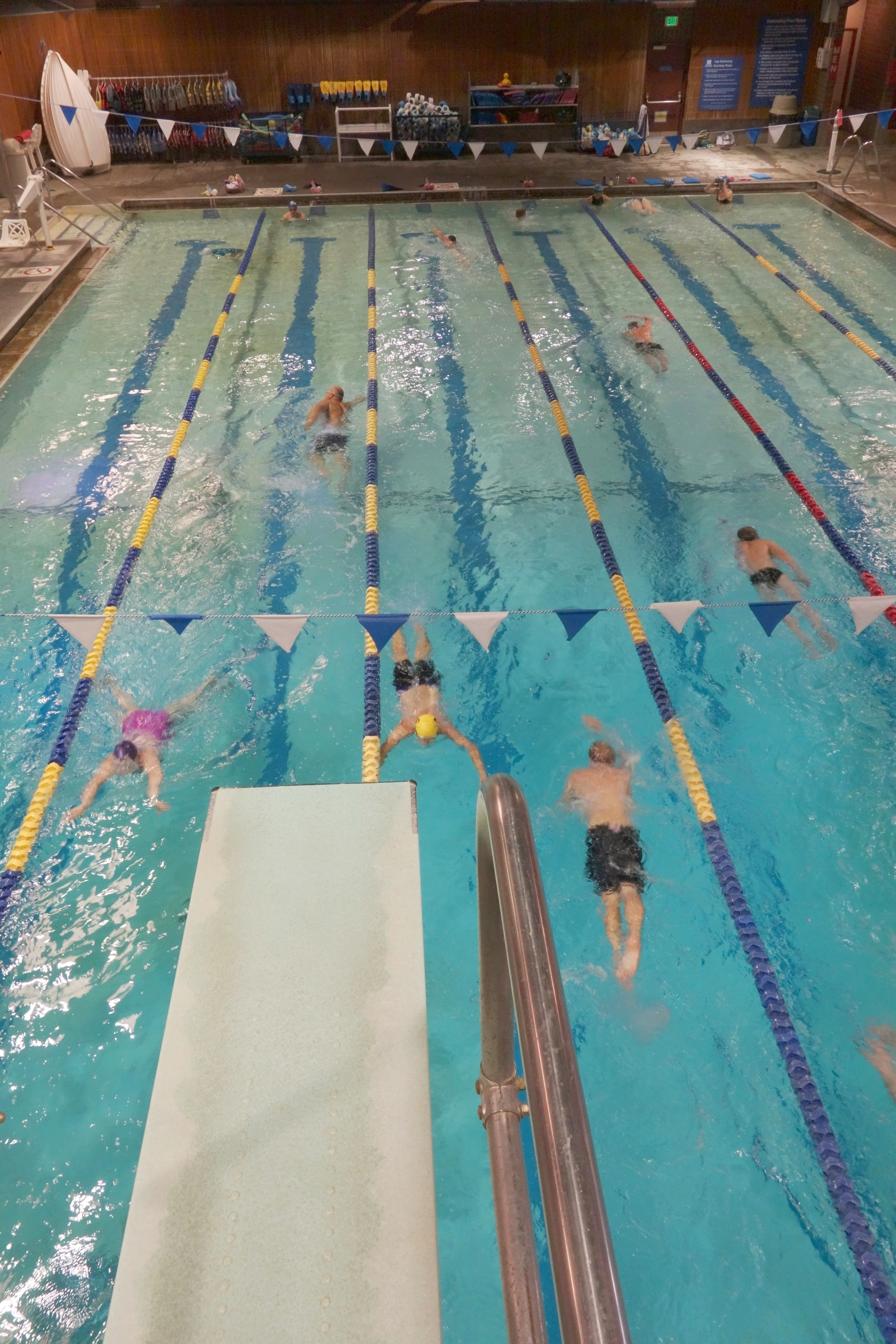
Swimmers at the pool, 2013

The Queen Anne Pool sits near the center of the Queen Anne neighborhood of Seattle, on a block bounded by Queen Anne Avenue N. to its east and 1st Avenue W. to its west, which separates the pool from McClure Middle School, Queen Anne Playfield, and the Queen Anne Community Center. Raised grassy berms to the north and south of the building, trees to the northeast and northwest, and flower beds on all sides shield the structure and blend it into the surrounding area, which mainly consists of single-family houses. A 50 ft (15 m) wide concrete walkway featuring concrete bollards and a bike rack connect the building to the street and the crosswalk to the middle school. It is located near the top of Queen Anne Hill, at an elevation of 380 feet (120 m).

=== Architecture ===
The building is fashioned from reinforced concrete, with a brick veneer in running bond. It is roughly T-shaped, with the wide edge facing towards 1st Avenue. This side of the building is single-story, and features a large recessed front entrance to the pool composed of six 6-foot-wide (1.8 m) bays, with a pair of single doors at the center . Above the entrance is an awning displaying the name "Queen Anne Aquatic Center". The pool area itself is within the one-and-a-half-story leg of the T. Above it, the asymmetrical red roof alternates between sloped (fashioned from corrugated metal) and flat portions (built from composition roofing), mirroring the depth of the pool itself; this gives clearance for the pool's diving board. Exposed timber beams, stained to blend in with the surrounding brickwork, hold up the roof inside the pool area. A number of skylights have been installed along the outer portion of the roof.

The building's natatorium is lined with concrete walls, with brick on the uppermost portions. The pool itself is 75 by 43 ft (23 by 13 m), sloping from 3 ft (0.9 m) in depth on the south end to 12 ft (4 m) on the north, and is flanked by a concrete deck. The pool features one-meter and three-meter diving platforms, adjacent to a number of starting blocks for racing, alongside a rope swing suspended from a beam over the deep end of the pool. A pool lift provides additional access to the pool. A public sauna sits adjacent to the natatorium. The building measures 13,300 sq ft (1,240 m^{2}) in area.

The pool is designed in a modernist style most visible in the interior due to aspects such as wood slat paneling and exposed brickwork, concrete, and support beams. However, it also features callbacks to earlier architecture, such as the use of a stepped parapet. The building was designed to maintain compatible infill, blending into the surrounding structures in its design and materials, with significant inspiration taken from the architecture of the adjacent middle school.
