= Sarah Cornell =

Sarah Cornell may refer to:

- Sarah Maria Cornell (1803–1832), American mill worker found hanged
- Sarah Cornell (actress), Canadian actress
