= Community centers in Seattle =

Aspect of leisure in Seattle, Washington

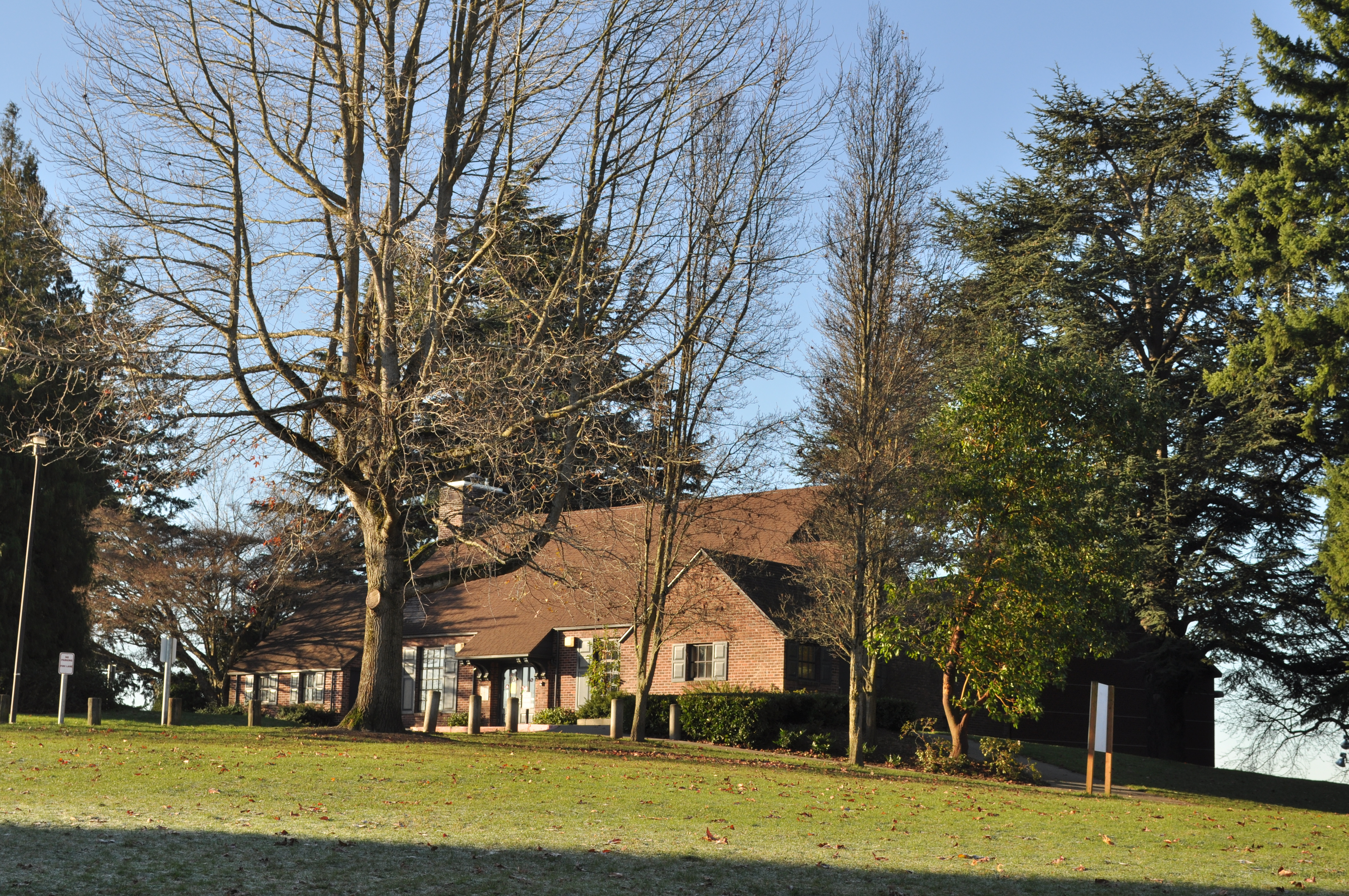
Laurelhurst Community Center

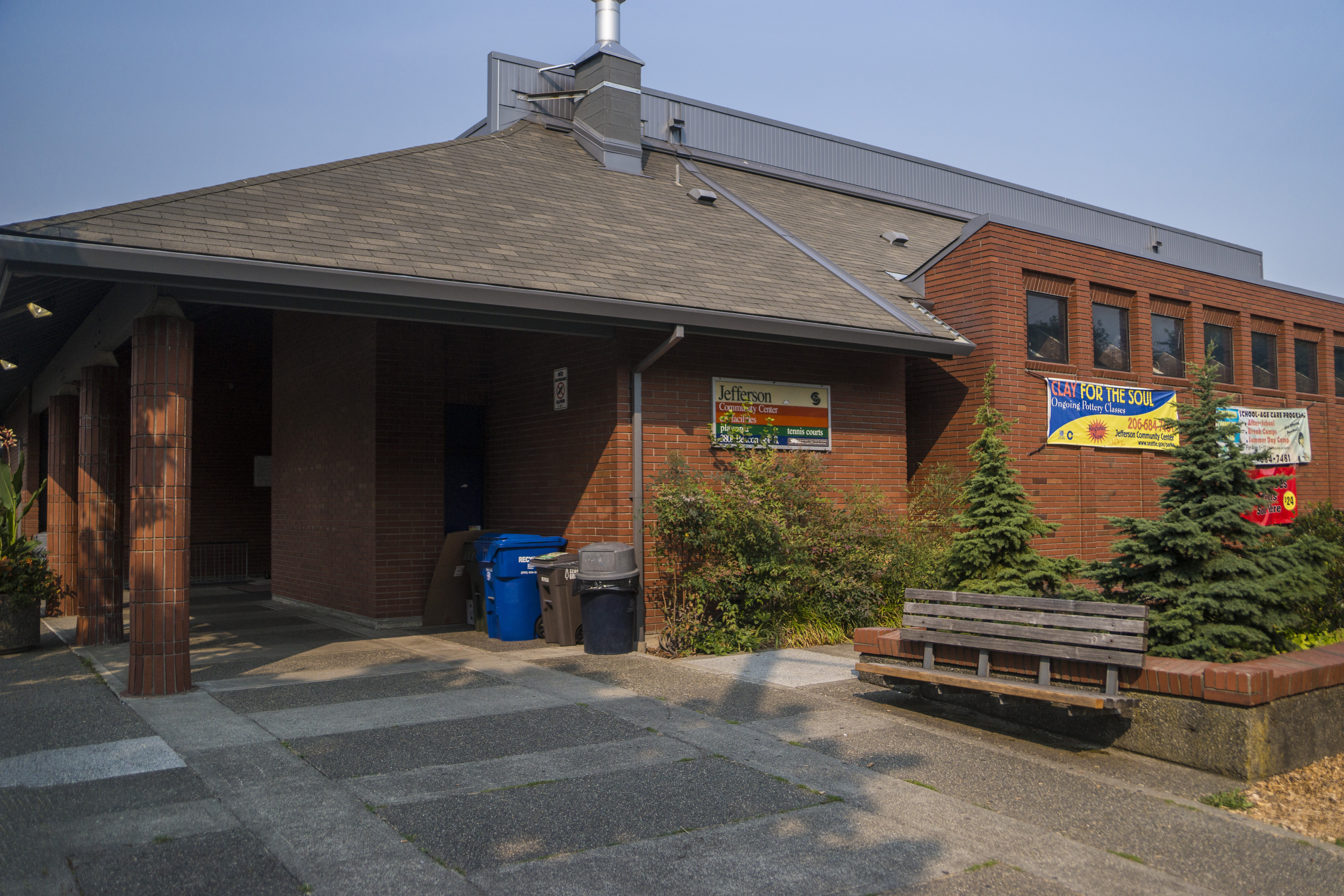
Jefferson Community Center

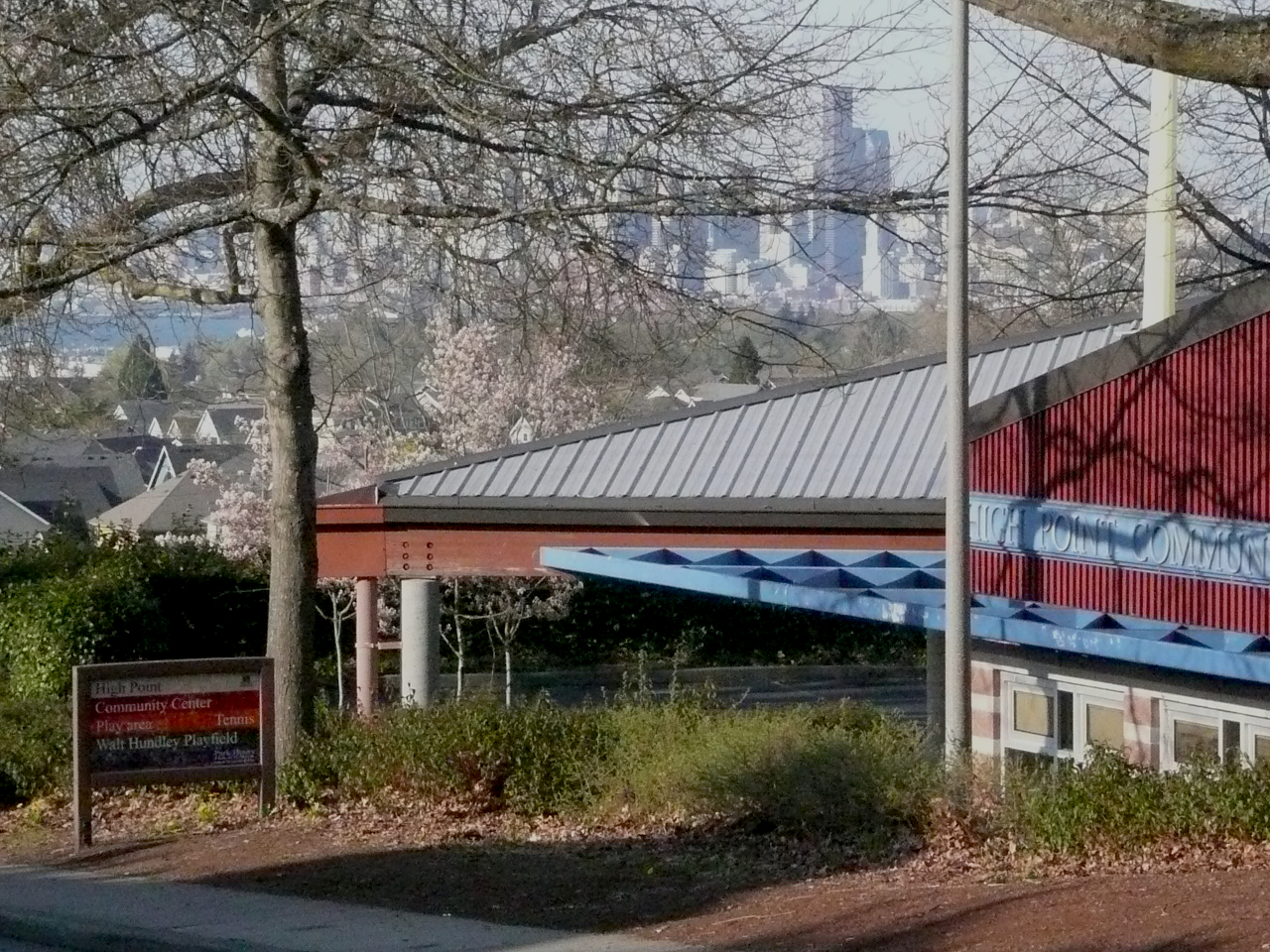
High Point Community Center

Seattle, Washington is home to many community centers. During the day some of these centers have child services such as day camp, after-school camp, and swimming activities.

As of 2011, there were 25 community centers in Seattle that were operated by the Seattle Department of Parks and Recreation. The community centers had their hours of operation reduced due to budget cuts in the 2010s; services were later restored through funding from a nonprofit organization that lasted until 2019.

== North Seattle ==
- Ballard Community Center, 6020 28th Avenue NW
- Green Lake Community Center, 7201 E Green Lake Drive N
- Laurelhurst Community Center, 4554 NE 41st Street
- Loyal Heights Community Center, 2101 NW 77th Street

== South Seattle ==
- Rainier Community Center, 4600 38th Avenue S
- Rainier Beach Community Center, 8825 Rainier Avenue S
- Van Asselt Community Center, 2820 S Myrtle Street
- Jefferson Community Center, 3801 Beacon Avenue S

== West Seattle ==
- Hiawatha Community Center, 2700 California Ave SW
- High Point Community Center, 6920 34th Ave SW
- Alki Community Center, 5817 SW Stevens St
- Delridge Community Center, 4501 Delridge Way SW

== See also ==
- Queen Anne Community Center – Community center in Seattle, Washington, U.S.
