= List of Olmsted works =

The landscape architecture firm of Frederick Law Olmsted, and later of his sons John Charles Olmsted and Frederick Law Olmsted Jr. (known as the Olmsted Brothers), produced designs and plans for hundreds of parks, campuses and other projects throughout the United States and Canada. Together, these works totaled 355. This is a non-exhaustive list of those projects.

== Frederick Law Olmsted Sr. ==
=== Academic campuses ===
Frederick Law Olmsted Sr. designed numerous school and college campuses between 1857 and 1895. Some of the most famous done while he headed his firm are listed here. Projects continuing past Olmsted's retirement in 1895 were completed by his sons, the Olmsted Brothers.

- American University Main Campus, Washington, D.C.
- Berwick Academy, South Berwick, Maine (1894)
- Bryn Mawr College, Bryn Mawr, Pennsylvania (1885)
- Cornell University, Ithaca, New York (1867–1873)
- Fairleigh Dickinson University, Madison, New Jersey
- Gallaudet University, Washington, D.C. (1866)
- Groton School, Groton, Massachusetts (1884–1904)
- Lawrenceville School, Lawrenceville, New Jersey (1883–1901)
- Manhattanville College, Purchase, New York
- Mount Holyoke College, South Hadley, Massachusetts
- Noble and Greenough School, Dedham, Massachusetts
- Phillips Academy, Andover, Massachusetts (1891–1965)
- Pomfret School, Pomfret, Connecticut
- St. Albans School (Washington, D.C.)
- Smith College, Northampton, Massachusetts (1891–1909)
- The Southern Baptist Theological Seminary, Louisville, KY
- Stanford University, Palo Alto, California, Main Quad (1887–1906) and campus master plan (1886–1914)
- Trinity College, Hartford, Connecticut (1872–1894)
- University of California, Berkeley, Berkeley, California, master plan (1865)
- University of Chicago, Chicago, Illinois
- University of Maine, Orono, Maine
- University of Rochester, Rochester, New York
- Washington University in St. Louis, St. Louis, Missouri (1865–1899)
- Wellesley College, Wellesley, Massachusetts
- Yale University, New Haven, Connecticut (1874–1881)

=== Selected private and civic designs ===
By Frederick Law Olmsted Sr.:

Project	City	State or province	Date
Arnold Arboretum	Boston	Massachusetts	1877
Back Bay Fens, Arborway and Riverway	Boston	Massachusetts	1890s–1900
Bayard Cutting Arboretum State Park	Great River	New York, on Long Island	
Beardsley Park	Bridgeport	Connecticut	1884
Belle Isle Park	Detroit	Michigan	master plan and landscape in the 1880s
Biltmore Estate grounds	Asheville	North Carolina	1890–1895
Brandywine Park	Wilmington	Delaware	1886
Buffalo, New York parks system	Buffalo	New York	
Butler Hospital	Providence	Rhode Island	
Buttonwood Park	Buttonwood Park Historic District, New Bedford	Massachusetts	
Cadwalader Park	Trenton	New Jersey	
Central Park	Manhattan	New York	1853 (opened in 1856)
Cherokee Park	Louisville	Kentucky	
Congress Park	Saratoga Springs	New York	
Cushing Island	Portland	Maine	
D.W. Field Park	Brockton	Massachusetts	
Dilworth	Charlotte	North Carolina	
Downing Park	Newburgh	New York	
Druid Hills Historic District and parks along Ponce de Leon Avenue (Springdale, Virgilee, Druid Hills, Brightwood, Shady Side, Olmsted Linear, Deepdene)	Druid Hills (Atlanta)	Georgia	
Eastern Parkway	Brooklyn	New York	
Edgewood Park	Westville, New Haven	Connecticut	
Elizabeth Park	Hartford & West Hartford	Connecticut	
Elmwood Cemetery	Detroit	Michigan	
Emerald Necklace	Boston	Massachusetts	
Filmore Farm Charles Henry Jones	Weston	Massachusetts	circa 1880
Fine Arts Garden	Cleveland	Ohio	
Florham, former estate of Hamilton and Florence (Vanderbilt) Twombly. Now the campus of Fairleigh Dickinson University	Florham Park	New Jersey	
Forest Park	Queens	New York	
Fort Greene Park	Brooklyn	New York	
Franklin Park	Boston	Massachusetts	
Genesee Valley Park	Rochester	New York	
Glen Magna Farms	Danvers	Massachusetts	
Grand Army Plaza	Brooklyn	New York	
Highland Park	Rochester	New York	
Hubbard Park	Meriden, Connecticut	Connecticut	
The Institute of Living	Hartford	Connecticut	1860s
Jackson Park, originally South Park	Chicago	Illinois	
John T. Davis house (17 Westmoreland Place)	St. Louis	Missouri	1892
Lakehurst Gardens	Roches Point	Ontario	ca. 1870
Lake Park	Milwaukee	Wisconsin	
Lynn Woods	Lynn	Massachusetts	
Manchester Town Common	Manchester	Massachusetts	
Manor Park	Larchmont	New York	
Masconomo Park	Manchester	Massachusetts	
Maplewood Park	Rochester	New York	
MIT Endicott House	Dedham	Massachusetts	
Montebello Park	St. Catharines	Ontario	
Morningside Park	New York City	New York	
Mount Royal Park	Montreal	Quebec	inaugurated in 1876
Mountain View Cemetery	Oakland	California	dedicated in 1865
National Zoological Park	Washington	District of Columbia	
Nay Aug Park	Scranton	Pennsylvania	
New York State Hospital for the Insane	Buffalo	New York	
Niagara Reservation (now Niagara Falls State Park)	Niagara Falls	New York	dedicated in 1885
Ocean Parkway	Brooklyn	New York	
Olmsted Linear Park	Atlanta	Georgia	
Oyster Harbors	Osterville	Massachusetts	
Piedmont Avenue	Berkeley	California	
Roads and green space in central village area of Pinehurst	Pinehurst	North Carolina	ground broken in 1895
Point Chautauqua, a Baptist planned resort community	Point Chautauqua	New York	
Prospect Park	Brooklyn	New York	finished 1868
Public Pleasure Grounds	San Francisco	California	
River Park (now Riverside Park)	Milwaukee	Wisconsin	
Village of Riverside	Riverside	Illinois	
Riverside Drive	Manhattan	New York	
Riverside Park	Manhattan	New York	
The Rockery	Easton	Massachusetts	
Ruggles Park	Fall River	Massachusetts	
Seaside Park	Bridgeport	Connecticut	1860s
Seneca Park	Rochester	New York	
Shelburne Farms	Shelburne	Vermont	
Skillman Epilepsy Hospital (subsequently North Princeton Developmental Center)	Montgomery	New Jersey	
South Park (now Kennedy Park)	Fall River	Massachusetts	1868
Sudbrook Park	Baltimore	Maryland	1889
Olmsted Subdivision Historic District	Swampscott	Massachusetts	
United States Capitol grounds	Washington	District of Columbia	
Vanderbilt Mausoleum	Staten Island	New York	
Walnut Hill Park	New Britain	Connecticut	
Washington Park	Chicago	Illinois	circa 1870 (blueprints were destroyed in the Great Chicago Fire of 1871)
West Park Zoological Gardens (now Washington Park)	Milwaukee	Wisconsin	
Whitman Town Park	Whitman	Massachusetts	circa 1875
Willow Brook Cemetery	Westport	Connecticut	circa 1881
Woodburn Circle, West Virginia University	Morgantown	West Virginia	
Wood Island Park (taken by eminent domain in the 1960s to expand Logan International Airport)	Boston	Massachusetts	
World's Columbian Exposition	Chicago	Illinois	1893
World's End, formerly the John Brewer Estate	Hingham, Massachusetts	Massachusetts	1889

== Olmsted Brothers ==
After the retirement of Frederick Law Olmsted Sr in 1895, the firm was managed by John Charles Olmsted and Frederick Law Olmsted Jr., as Olmsted and Olmsted, Olmsted Olmsted and Eliot, and Olmsted Brothers. Works from this period, which spanned from 1895 to 1950, are often misattributed to Frederick Sr. They include:

=== Academic campuses ===
- Alabama A&M University, Normal, Alabama
- Bryn Mawr College, Bryn Mawr, Pennsylvania (1895–1927)
- Chatham University, Pittsburgh, Pennsylvania
- Denison University, Granville, Ohio (1916)
- Eastern Kentucky University, Richmond, Kentucky
- Fisk University, Nashville, Tennessee (1929-1933)
- Florence State Teachers College, Florence, Alabama (University of North Alabama)
- Grove City College, Grove City, Pennsylvania (1929)
- Harvard Business School, Allston, Massachusetts (1925–1931)
- Haverford College, Haverford, Pennsylvania (1925–1932)*
- Huntingdon College campus, Montgomery, Alabama
- Indiana University, Bloomington, Indiana (1929–1936)
- Iowa State University Ames, Iowa (1906)
- Johns Hopkins University, Baltimore, Maryland (1903–1919)
- Lafayette College, Easton, Pennsylvania (1909)
- Lincoln Institute, Lincoln Ridge, Kentucky (1911)
- Louisiana State University, Baton Rouge, Louisiana
- Morehead State University, Morehead, Kentucky (1923)
- Middlesex School, Concord, Massachusetts (1901)
- Mount Holyoke College, South Hadley, Massachusetts (1896–1922)
- Newton Country Day School, Newton, Massachusetts (1927)
- Oberlin College, Oberlin, Ohio (1903)
- Ohio State University, Columbus, Ohio (1909)
- Oregon State University, Corvallis, Oregon (1909)
- Roslyn High School, Roslyn, New York (1920s)
- Saint Joseph College, West Hartford, Connecticut
- Samford University, Homewood, Alabama
- Stanford University, Stanford, California (1886–1914)
- Troy University, Troy, Alabama
- Tufts University, Medford, Massachusetts (1920)
- University of Chicago, Chicago, Illinois (1901–1910)
- University of Florida, Gainesville, Florida (1925)
- University of Idaho, Moscow, Idaho (1908)
- University of Montevallo, Montevallo, Alabama
- University of Maine, Orono, Maine (1932)
- University of Notre Dame, Notre Dame, Indiana (1929–1932)
- University of Rhode Island, Kingston, Rhode Island (1894–1903)
- University of Washington, Seattle, Washington (1902–1920)
- Vassar College, Poughkeepsie, New York (1896–1932)
- Western Michigan University Main Campus, Kalamazoo, Michigan (1904)
- Williams College, Williamstown, Massachusetts (1902–1912)

=== Selected private and civic designs ===
By Olmsted and Olmsted, Olmsted Olmsted and Eliot, and Olmsted Brothers:

- Adair Country Inn gardens, Bethlehem, New Hampshire
- Audubon Park, New Orleans, Louisiana
- Ashland Park, residential neighborhood built around Ashland, The Henry Clay Estate in Lexington, Kentucky
- Bloomfield, Villanova, PA. Private house of George McFadden.
- Branch Brook Park, Newark, New Jersey
- The British Properties, Vancouver, British Columbia, Canada
- Brookdale Park, Bloomfield & Montclair, New Jersey
- Cambridge American Cemetery and Memorial a memorial for American World War II servicemen in Cambridgeshire, near Cambridge, England
- Caracas Country Club (1928), Alta Florida, Capital District, Caracas, Venezuela
- Carroll Park, Baltimore, Maryland
- Cedar Brook Park, Shakespeare Garden, Plainfield, New Jersey
- Cleveland Metroparks System, in the Greater Cleveland area, Ohio
- Craig Colony for Epileptics, Sonyea, New York
- Crocker Field, Fitchburg, Massachusetts
- Deering Oaks, Portland, Maine
- The Gardens at Dey Mansion Washington's Headquarters, Wayne, New Jersey
- Druid Hills, Atlanta, Georgia
- Dunn Gardens, Seattle, Washington
- Eastern Promenade, Portland, Maine
- Elm Bank Horticulture Center, Wellesley, Massachusetts
- Fairmont Park, Riverside, California
- First Presbyterian Church of Far Rockaway, Queens, New York
- Fort Tryon Park, New York City
- Franklin Delano Roosevelt Park, Philadelphia, Pennsylvania (originally League Island Park)
- Fresh Pond, Cambridge, Massachusetts
- Garret Mountain Reservation, Woodland Park, New Jersey
- Goffle Brook Park, Hawthorne, New Jersey
- Grover Cleveland Park, Caldwell, New Jersey
- Hermann Dudley Murphy House, Lexington, Massachusetts
- Hiawatha Playfield, Seattle, Washington
- High Point Park, Montague, New Jersey
- High Rock Reservation, a park in Lynn, Massachusetts
- Homelands Neighborhood, Springfield, Massachusetts
- "New" Katonah, Katonah, New York
- Kentucky State Capitol Grounds, Frankfort, Kentucky
- Kohler (Village of), Wisconsin
- Kykuit gardens, Rockefeller family estate, Mount Pleasant (from 1897 but largely revised by later architects)
- Leimert Park Neighborhood, Los Angeles
- Locust Valley Cemetery, Locust Valley, New York
- Metro Parks, Summit County, Ohio
- Manito Park and Botanical Gardens, Spokane, Washington
- Marconi Plaza (originally Oregon Plaza)
- Marquette Park, Chicago, Illinois
- Memorial Park (Jacksonville), Florida
- Memorial Park, Maplewood, New Jersey
- Mill Creek Park, Youngstown, Ohio
- Munsey Park, New York
- North Park, Fall River, Massachusetts, 1901
- Otto Kahn Estate, Cold Spring Hills, New York
- Oldfields-Lilly House and Gardens, a National Historic Landmark, originally Hugh Landon estate (Olmsted job # 6883 1920–1927) , Indianapolis, Indiana
- Palos Verdes Estates Project, Palos Verdes Estates, California (Olmsted Job #05950, Start Year 1920)
- Passaic County Parks System
- Piedmont Park, Atlanta, Georgia
- Pittsburgh downtown ("industrial district") and thoroughfares, 1909
- Planting Fields, Oyster Bay, Long Island, New York
- Pope Park (Hartford, Connecticut)
- The Portland park plan, Portland, Oregon
- Plan for Los Angeles Region, with Harland Bartholomew & Associates (1930)
- Preakness Valley Park, Wayne, New Jersey
- Prouty Garden, Boston Children's Hospital, Boston This garden is at risk of being destroyed for redevelopment purposes.
- Pulaski Park, Holyoke, Massachusetts
- Rahway River Parkway Union County, New Jersey
- Riverside Park, Hartford, Connecticut
- Rancho Los Alamitos Gardens, Long Beach, California
- Riverbend, Walter J. Kohler Sr. estate grounds, Kohler, Wisconsin
- Seattle Park System
- Southern Boulevard Parkway (Philadelphia, Pennsylvania)
- South Mountain Reservation, Maplewood, Millburn, South Orange, West Orange, New Jersey
- South Park (now Kennedy Park), Fall River, Massachusetts, 1904
- Spokane, Washington city parks
- Springdale Park, Holyoke, Massachusetts
- Thompson Park and roadways, Watertown, New York
- Union County, New Jersey park system
- Uplands, Victoria, British Columbia, Canada
- Utica, New York Parks and Parkway System (1908–1914)
- Landscape of the Town of Vandergrift, Pennsylvania (1895)
- Verona Park, Verona, New Jersey
- Wade Lagoon, on University Circle, Cleveland
- The garden at Welwyn Preserve, Long Island, New York
- Warinanco Park, Roselle, New Jersey
- Washington State Capitol campus, Olympia, Washington
- Watsessing Park, Bloomfield, New Jersey
- Weasel Brook Park, Clifton, New Jersey
- Weequahic Park, Weequahic section of Newark, New Jersey
- The Highlands Neighborhood, Seattle
- Barberrys, Nelson Doubleday house, Mill Neck, New York (1919–1924)
- "Allgates," Horatio Gates Lloyd house, Coopertown Road, Haverford, Pennsylvania (1911–1915)
