= Kennedy Park (Fall River, Massachusetts) =

- U.S. National Register of Historic Places
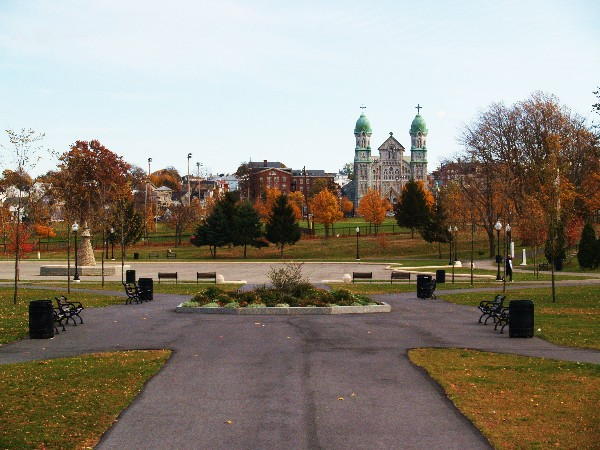

- Location within Massachusetts Location within the United States
- Location: Fall River, Massachusetts
- Coordinates: 41°41′44″N 71°10′12″W
- Built: 1868
- Architect: Olmsted Brothers; Vaux & Co.
- Architectural style: Colonial Revival, Shingle Style
- MPS: Fall River MRA
- NRHP reference No.: 83000686
- Added to NRHP: February 16, 1983

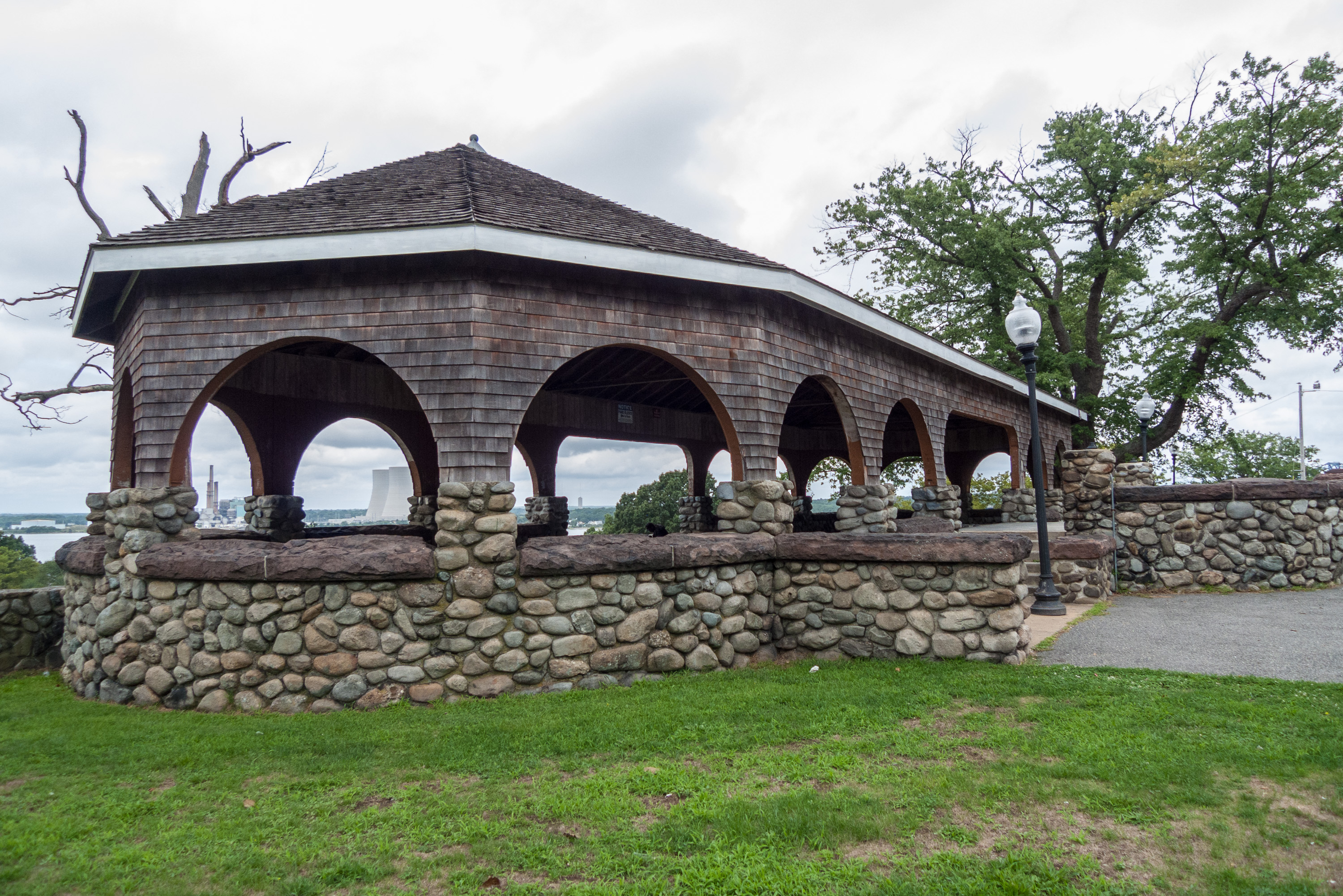
The Pavilion at Kennedy Park, Fall River, Massachusetts.

Kennedy Park (originally known as South Park) is a 57-acre (23 ha) historic park located in Fall River, Massachusetts. It is bounded by South Main Street, Bradford Avenue, Middle, and Bay Streets in the southern part of the city. The area of the city where the park is located was until 1862, part of Rhode Island.

== History ==
The park was originally the farm of John Durfee. The location gained national attention in December 1832, when the pregnant lifeless body of Sarah M. Cornell was found hanging from a stackpole there. Her death was later deemed to be murder. Methodist minister Ephraim K. Avery was accused of the crime, but acquitted after a sensational trial. The verdict outraged many local citizens. Sarah's body was initially buried on the Durfee farm, but moved years later to Oak Grove Cemetery when the park was being built.

Built in 1868, designed by famed 19th century landscape architect Frederick Law Olmsted and Calvert Vaux, the park was originally known as "South Park". It was updated in 1904 by the Olmsted Brothers. The park was renamed in 1963 following the assassination of President John F. Kennedy. The park provides a vast area of open space in the middle of a particularly dense portion of the city, surrounded by many triple-decker working-class tenement houses and the Catholic St. Anne's Church.

== Description ==
The park has three sections: a flat upper section used for baseball and recreation fields, a sloping middle portion with sweeping views of Mount Hope Bay, and a lower somewhat wooded portion along the Bay.

The park was added to the National Historic Register in 1983. It was restored in 2001.

Kennedy Park has long been used a place for public events in the city.

In September 1996, over 25,000 people gathered in the lower portion of the park to see then President Bill Clinton during a campaign stop for his 1996 re-election.

Each August since 1986, the park hosts the Great Holy Ghost Feast of New England, a celebration of Azorean culture which attracts over 200,000 people each year.

In 2014, an "inclusion playground" opened in Kennedy Park, which features equipment accessible to children with disabilities. The park includes a partially fenced playground area with slides, a seesaw, and mini monkey bars. An empty ice skating rink provides a place for children to ride bicycles.

== See also ==
- National Register of Historic Places listings in Fall River, Massachusetts
- List of Olmsted works
