= Ota Residence =

General information
- Architectural style: Mid-century modern
- Location: Rainier Beach, Seattle, Washington, United States
- Address: 10300 61st Avenue
- Coordinates: 47.5086°N 122.2582°W
- Year(s) built: 1955–1956

Technical details
- Floor count: 2
- Floor area: 2,540 sq ft (236 m^{2})

Design and construction
- Architect(s): Benjamin F. McAdoo

The Ota Residence is a house located in the Rainier Beach neighborhood of Seattle. Commissioned by Kenneth and Kimi Ota in 1955 and designed by architect Benjamin F. McAdoo, the two-story residence is built in a blend of mid-century modern and traditional Japanese architecture. It features five bedrooms, two bathrooms, and second-story deck overlooking a forested terrace. Built on a steeply sloping hill, the main entrance and carport are located on the southern side of the top floor. The upper story also features shoji sliding doors in addition to a two-sided fireplace and a tokonoma alcove which divide the dining and living rooms. The house was declared "House of the Month' by Margery Philips in a May 1956 Seattle Times column. It remained in the possession of the Ota family until 2004, when it was sold to architect Hiroshi Asano.

== Description ==
The residence sits on a steeply sloped lot on a cul-de-sac at the end of 61st Avenue South in the Rainier Beach neighborhood of Seattle, overlooking Lake Washington and the Cascades. The lot features a variety of trees and native vegetation in order to provide privacy for the property, alongside a rock garden and access to an adjacent stream. The house itself is L-shaped, with 2,540 sq ft (236 m^{2}) of floor space divided evenly between its two stories; both function as living units by themselves. The master bedroom is on the upper level, sharing a compartmented bathroom with an adjacent bedroom. The upper story also features a living room, dining room, a kitchen, and an entrance room. The lower level has three bedrooms and a bar, alongside a playroom and storage space. An enclosed carport on the southern flank of the residence, adjacent to the main entrance, is accessible via the kitchen.

The southern side has no windows or portals beyond the carport, entranceway, and a single vertical window adjacent to the front door. Shoji (sliding paper doors) shield the entrance room from the rest of the household. A two-way fireplace (connected to a brick chimney) divides the living and dining room, adjacent to a tokonoma alcove for storing artifacts. The exterior wall of the tokonoma features a built-in desk. A deck is accessible on the northern side of the upper story, with a patio below on the ground floor. Floor-to-ceiling windows look out over the deck to the surrounding trees. The building has poured concrete foundations. It is clad in brick veneer and vertical cedar siding.

=== History ===
The residence was commissioned by Kenneth and Kimi Ota, a Japanese-American family with four young children at the time of construction. Due to redlining practices, Rainier Beach was one of only a few areas where Japanese families could purchase or rent property. Kenneth worked as a buyer for Boeing, which had various facilities in the industrial district to the west of Rainier Beach. The house was designed by the architect Benjamin F. McAdoo and built by Torkel Nilson from 1955 to 1956. McAdoo had entered architectural practice in the late 1940s, noted as the first licensed African-American architect in the state of Washington. His designs were generally influenced both by Modern architecture and the Northwest Regional style, but he incorporated various influences from traditional Japanese architecture for the Ota Residence. In a May 1956 Seattle Times column, architecture journalist Margery Philips declared the residence the "House of the Month".

The house initially had the address 10240 61st Avenue South, but its street number changed to 10300 in 1960. Kenneth Ota lived in the house until 1969. The property stayed in the possession of the Ota family until 2004, when it was sold to architect Hiroshi Asano and Frances Asano, who remained occupants as of 2010.
