= Hiawatha Playfield =

Park in Seattle, Washington, U.S.

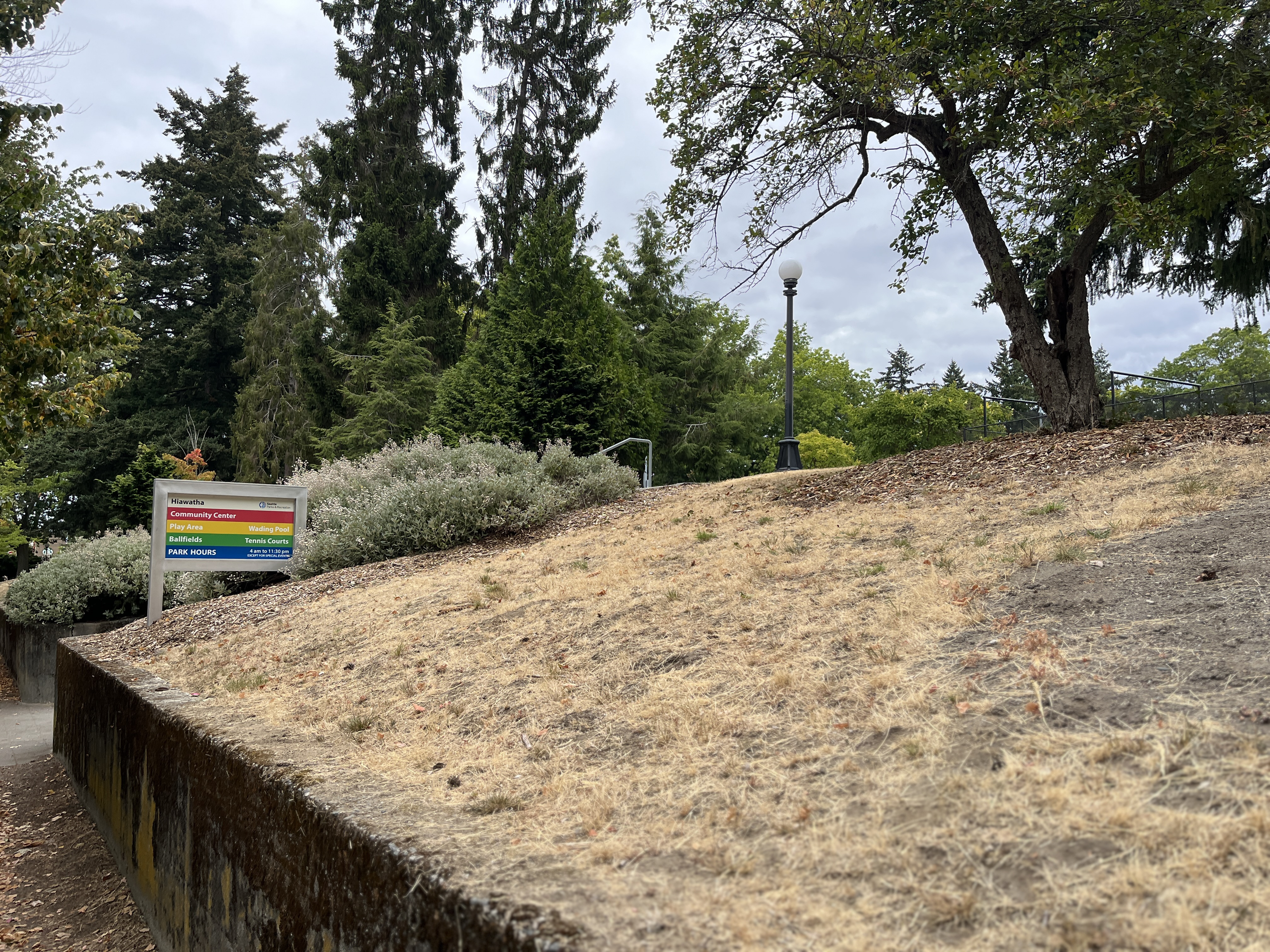
- Interactive map of Hiawatha Playfield
- Type: Public
- Location: Seattle, Washington, U.S.
- Coordinates: 47.579°N 122.386°W
- Area: 10.3 acres
- Opened: 1911; 115 years ago
- Operator: Seattle Parks and Recreation
- Designation: Seattle Landmark (1984)

Hiawatha Playfield (formerly West Seattle Playfield) is a 10.3-acre public park and recreation center in the Admiral District of West Seattle, Seattle, Washington. The park was designed by the Olmsted Brothers and dedicated in 1911. The community center building located on the east side of the playfield is recognized as the oldest municipal community center building west of the Mississippi River. The site was designated an official Seattle Landmark in 1984.

Hiawatha Playfield is located along California Avenue SW, immediately north of West Seattle High School and within walking distance of the Admiral District commercial core.

== History ==
Following the 1907 annexation of West Seattle, landscape architecture firm Olmsted Brothers recommended acquiring a 10.3-acre tract of second-growth forest in their 1908 park system expansion report. Eleven preliminary landscape and grading plans were completed between 1910 and 1911. Originally referred to as the West Seattle Playfield, Park Commissioner Ferdinand Schmitz proposed naming the park after the hero of Longfellow's poem The Song of Hiawatha.

The then 11.317 park was dedicated in 1911 as the largest public playfield in Seattle. Hiawatha was praised as a model recreation center in the Pacific Northwest. The unified design incorporated "spaces for team sports, playground equipment, a fieldhouse, gymnastic apparatus, ... groves of trees and planting beds." The park included a ballfield, a double tennis court, an outdoor gymnasium, a wading pool for older children, a playground for smaller children, and benches. Much of the park perimeter had paths and landscaping.

In the 1930s, a running track was moved. During World War II, the facility was temporarily repurposed by the War Department to quarter military officers and house troops in tents on the lawn. In 1948, Seattle voters passed a bond issue that funded the remodeling of the field house and the addition of a full-size gymnasium, which reopened in 1949.

In 1984, the playfield and community center complex were designated a City of Seattle Landmark. On May 31 of that same year, the Friends of Seattle's Olmsted Parks and the Seattle Department of Parks and Recreation cosponsored the first event celebrating of the Olmsted legacy in Seattle at Hiawatha Playfield, followed by a national conference highlighting "Olmsted Parks of the West."

The park underwent a renovation in 2009 that added artificial turf to a now larger ballfield and a new running track. It served as a gathering site for the 'We’re Still Standing' demonstration organized by West Seattle Indivisible in 2026.

Early 20th century
Planting Plan for Hiawatha Park

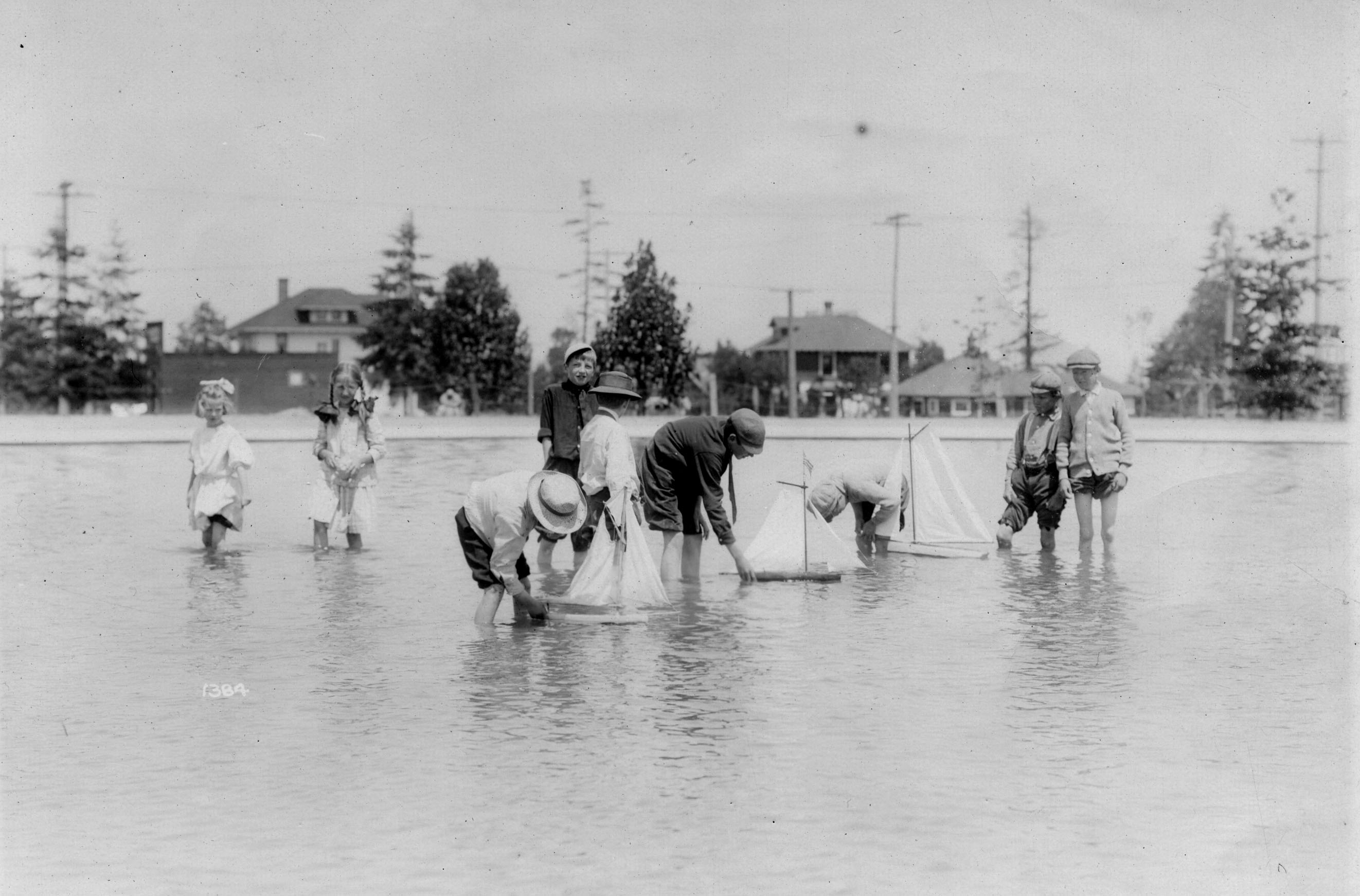
Hiawatha Playfield wading pool, 1912

Hiawatha Playfield in 1913

== Facilities and features ==
Hiawatha Community Center, 2008

The park and community center offer a wide range of recreational amenities:

Community Center

- Top floor: Features an auditorium and stage, along with a galley kitchenette.
- Main floor: Contains multi-purpose rooms for child care, youth programming, and classes.
- Lower level: Houses a full-size gymnasium utilized for adult and youth sports (such as table tennis, basketball, and volleyball), toddler playtimes, and community athletic leagues, alongside fitness facilities.

Playfield

- Full-sized synthetic athletic fields for soccer, football, and baseball, complete with an all-weather running track (jointly used with adjacent West Seattle High School).
- Outdoor tennis courts.
- Children's playground and seasonal wading pool.
- Landscaped walking paths, picnic tables, and open lawn areas incorporating historic plantings.

== See also ==
- Community centers in Seattle
- List of Olmsted works
- List of parks in Seattle
- List of Seattle landmarks
