= Benjamin F. McAdoo =

American architect (1920–1981)

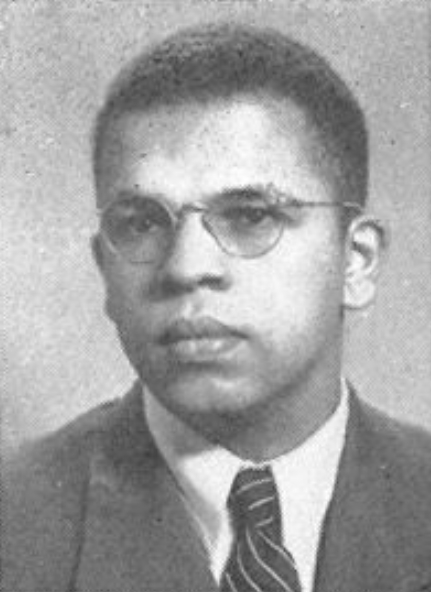
- McAdoo in 1946
- Born: Benjamin Franklin McAdoo Jr. October 29, 1920; Pasadena, California, US
- Died: June 18, 1981 (aged 60); Seattle, Washington, US
- Education: Pasadena Junior College; University of Southern California; University of Washington
- Occupation: Architect
- Years active: 1946–1981
- Style: Modernist; Northwest Regional
- Spouse: Alice Thelma Dent (m. 1942)
- Children: 3

Benjamin Franklin McAdoo Jr. (October 29, 1920 – June 18, 1981) was an American architect. He designed several residential, civic, and commercial structures in the Seattle area in a modernist aesthetic influenced by the Northwest Regional style.

Born in Pasadena, California, McAdoo attended school in southern California, where he was inspired by the work of Paul R. Williams and began to pursue architectural training. After working as a draftsman for local architectural firms and the Army Corps of Engineers, he pursued his Bachelor of Architecture at the University of Washington in Seattle, graduating in 1946. He became the first licensed African-American architect in the state of Washington, and after a brief period designing remodels and alterations, he began to receive commissions to design private residences.

Favorable coverage in The Seattle Times by architecture journalist Margery Phillips boosted McAdoo's career. A residence designed by him in Burien was declared the "Home of the Year" by The Seattle Times in association with the American Institute of Architects. After designing a number of low-income houses and apartments throughout the 1950s, including around eighty single-family "Houses of Merit", he was hired by the Agency for International Development to design modular houses in Jamaica. He returned to the United States after eighteen months in Jamaica and briefly worked for the Department of State and the General Services Administration in Washington, D.C., where he aided Edward Durell Stone in designing the John F. Kennedy Center for the Performing Arts. He returned to Seattle in 1964, where he pursued public and civic architectural commissions. In addition to his architectural work, he participated in the NAACP, (Note: In full, the National Association for the Advancement of Colored People) hosted a weekly radio show on racial issues for several years, and unsuccessfully ran for a seat in the Washington House of Representatives.

== Early life and education ==
On October 29, 1920, Benjamin Franklin McAdoo Jr. was born in Pasadena, California, to Alferetta Deroussel (Note: Her first name is sometimes rendered "Alfravetta", "Alforetta" and "Alfretta", and surname sometimes "Deroussell".) and Benjamin F. McAdoo Sr. He was the eldest of their four children. Benjamin McAdoo Sr. worked a variety of jobs, including as a hardwood floor contractor, while Alfaretta worked as a music instructor. McAdoo Jr. grew up in a racially diverse neighborhood of Pasadena, one of a few neighborhoods tolerating black renters when redlining practices excluded them from much of the city. He attended Pasadena High School while working part-time with his father on flooring installation and tree hauling. He took an interest in architecture after taking a mechanical drawing class in ninth grade. He frequently clipped newspaper articles about projects and architects, and became particularly inspired by the California African-American architect Paul R. Williams.

After graduating in 1938, McAdoo attended Pasadena Junior College. By 1940, he was living alongside his parents and siblings with his paternal grandmother, who ran a grocery store in the area. He was active in the local Seventh-day Adventist Church, giving speeches and sermons at church events. In 1941, he transferred to the University of Southern California in Los Angeles to study architecture. He worked nights and attended classes during the day, but was forced to withdraw from the university for financial reasons. He then began work at a number of private architectural firms in Los Angeles.

In July 1942, following the United States' entry into World War II, McAdoo joined the Army Corps of Engineers at Camp Roberts, California, where he continued to work as a draftsman. Soon afterwards, he married Alice Thelma Dent. In October 1943, the couple relocated with their newborn daughter to Portland, Oregon, for McAdoo to pursue a job at the Kaiser Shipyards designing pipe systems for oil tankers. He sent inquiries to the architecture departments of the University of Oregon and the University of Washington (UW), both of which approved his request to transfer credits from his previous colleges. He chose to enroll in UW, due to a more receptive response to his letters and his belief that Seattle would be a more racially tolerant environment for him and his family than Oregon. While at UW, he published a junior project entitled "An Automobile Salesroom and Shop for Maintenance and Repair" in the university's architectural year book. While in college, he entered employment at a firm owned by James J. Chiarelli and Paul Hayden Kirk, prolific designers of Seattle homes who helped create the Northwest Regional style.

== Architectural practice ==
McAdoo graduated with a Bachelor of Architecture degree on June 22, 1946. In October 1946, he became the first licensed African-American architect in the state of Washington. In the April of the following year, he left Chiarelli & Kirk to found his own practice, working from his apartment in Seattle's University District. Business was favorable for architects at this time due to a post-war housing boom. The housing market in Seattle had been limited since the Great Depression, with the last major expansion in the late 1920s. This period corresponded with the rise of modernist architecture in the United States. He was initially hired for remodels and alterations, undertaking seventeen such commissions during his first year of business.

In June 1947, he received his first full commission for the Madrona residence of local dentist and Black community activist John P. Browning. After living in various homes to the south of Seattle, McAdoo moved into the city proper in 1949, living in a renovated house across the street from the Browning residence. He participated in a small homes design competition in 1947, designing an 887 sq ft (80 m^{2}) ranch house featuring a butterfly roof. Although the design did not receive the prize, it was reviewed favorably in a column in The Seattle Times. His 1948–1949 Moorhouse residence in Magnolia, Seattle, was also praised by the paper. His work received consistently favorable coverage by The Seattle Times architecture columnist Margery Phillips, with her coverage becoming a major source of publicity across his early career. Beginning in 1954, Phillips launched a Seattle "Home-of-the-Month" column in association with the Seattle chapter of the American Institute of Architects. One of McAdoo's works was chosen as one of the first winners, and his houses would ultimately be featured ten times in Phillips' columns. In 1956, a home McAdoo designed for George Hage was selected as "Home of the Year".

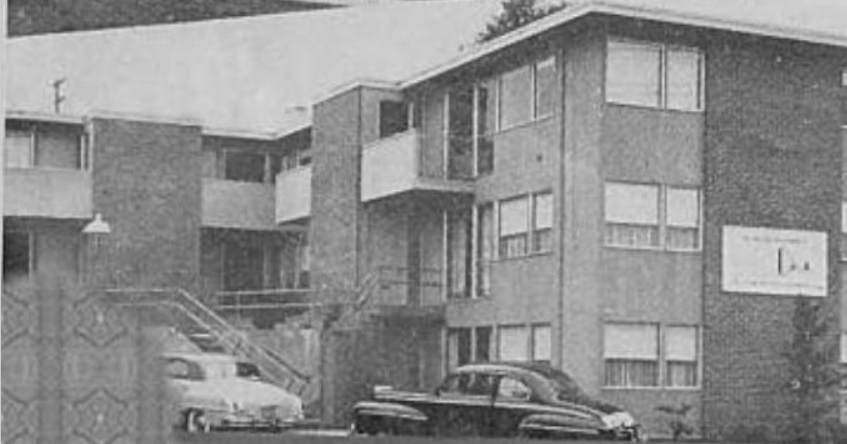
McAdoo's Ben Mar Apartments, 1951

McAdoo broke into real estate development in 1948, designing and establishing the nine-unit Ben-Mar Apartments, named for his children Benjamin and Marcia. Unlike other apartment complexes in the area, these apartments were not limited to White tenants. In 1950, he created a design for a 620 sq ft (60 m^{2}) single-family house titled the "House of Merit", featuring two bedrooms, a combined living and dining room, a projecting carport, and exterior walls covered in wood shakes. The House of Merit design was intended to be affordable and easy to construct; five of these homes were constructed before the end of the year, with around eighty constructed over the following four years. With increased business success, he purchased an office for his firm in 1951. The following year, he purchased a home in the Montlake neighborhood. At this time, less than 0.1% of the neighborhood's residents were Black. Local opinion among the predominately White residents was divided on his arrival due to tensions over racial integration in the city.

McAdoo's early designs were strongly influenced by the emerging Northwest Regional style, alongside general modern architecture. Key aspects of his designs include exposed structural elements, flat roofs, frequent use of wood, floor-to-ceiling windows, a reliance on horizontal lines, and the integration of the design into the surrounding landscape. His 1955–1956 design for the Kenneth & Kimi Ota house, the residence of a Japanese-American family living in Rainier Valley, Seattle, combined mid-century modern design with aspects of traditional Japanese architecture.

As residential neighborhoods spread across Seattle, McAdoo and his wife chose to relocate from Montlake into a residence outside of the Seattle city limits in the late 1950s, seeking to live closer to nature and take advantage of larger, less expensive properties. He selected a plot in the rural neighboring community of Bothell, which may have had nonexistent or unenforced laws against Black property owners. McAdoo and fellow architect Edward Watanabe designed the spacious residence in mid-century modern style, totaling 3,700 sq ft (340 m^{2}) across a main floor and an exposed basement. Phillips featured McAdoo's residence three times in her Seattle Times coverage.

=== Overseas and D.C. ===
After hosting a Ghanaian ambassador, McAdoo traveled to Ghana in 1960, seeking to set up an architectural business in the newly independent country. This venture was unsuccessful, but led to him meeting with President Kwame Nkrumah and hosting Ghanaian exchange students at his house. In 1961, he designed the "Pagoda of Medicine" in Nashville, Tennessee, which served as the medical offices of his brother-in-law Carl A. Dent. That same year, he was appointed the Chief Housing Advisor of the United States Agency for International Development (USAID), and was sent to design modular homes in Jamaica. He arrived in Kingston on January 14, 1962.

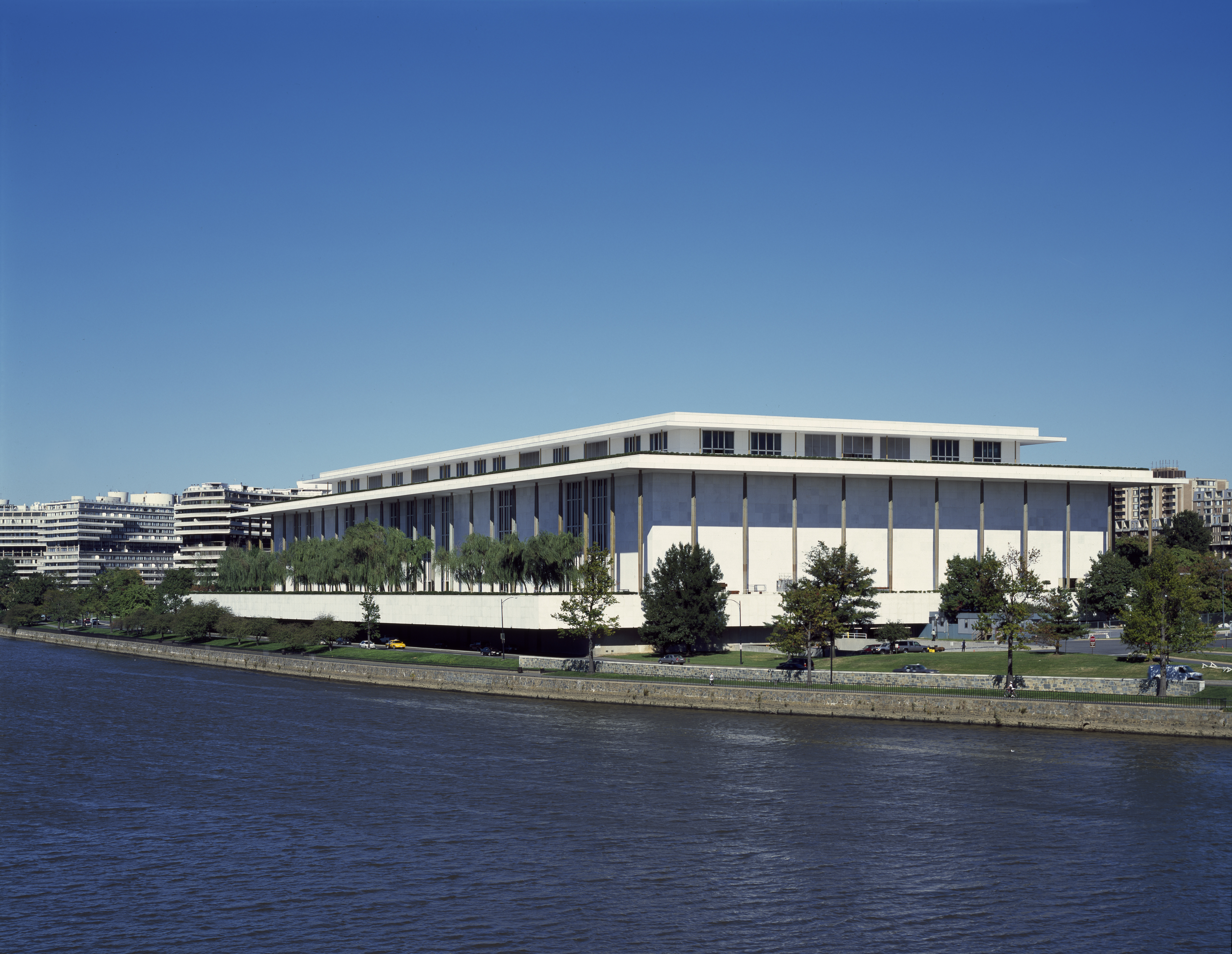
McAdoo served as a coordinating architect for the Kennedy Center for the Performing Arts under Edward Durell Stone.

These homes were fashioned from concrete blocks and were able to be constructed by untrained builders, and allowed low-income areas to be connected to water and electrical infrastructure. While in Jamaica, McAdoo lived in a middle-class neighborhood, unlike the upper class accommodations where most foreigners were residing. He attended ceremonies for the Independence of Jamaica in 1962, alongside other American dignitaries such as Vice President Lyndon B. Johnson.

After staying in Jamaica for 18 months, McAdoo briefly stayed in Washington, D.C., where he did architectural work for the Department of State and the General Services Administration. During this time, he continued to do some work in Seattle, designing the Four Seas Restaurant with Robert K. L. Wong. In D.C., McAdoo designed elements of the John F. Kennedy Center for the Performing Arts supervised by chief architect Edward Durell Stone. He attempted to organize a Latin America division of the USAID, but was unsuccessful.

=== Later career ===
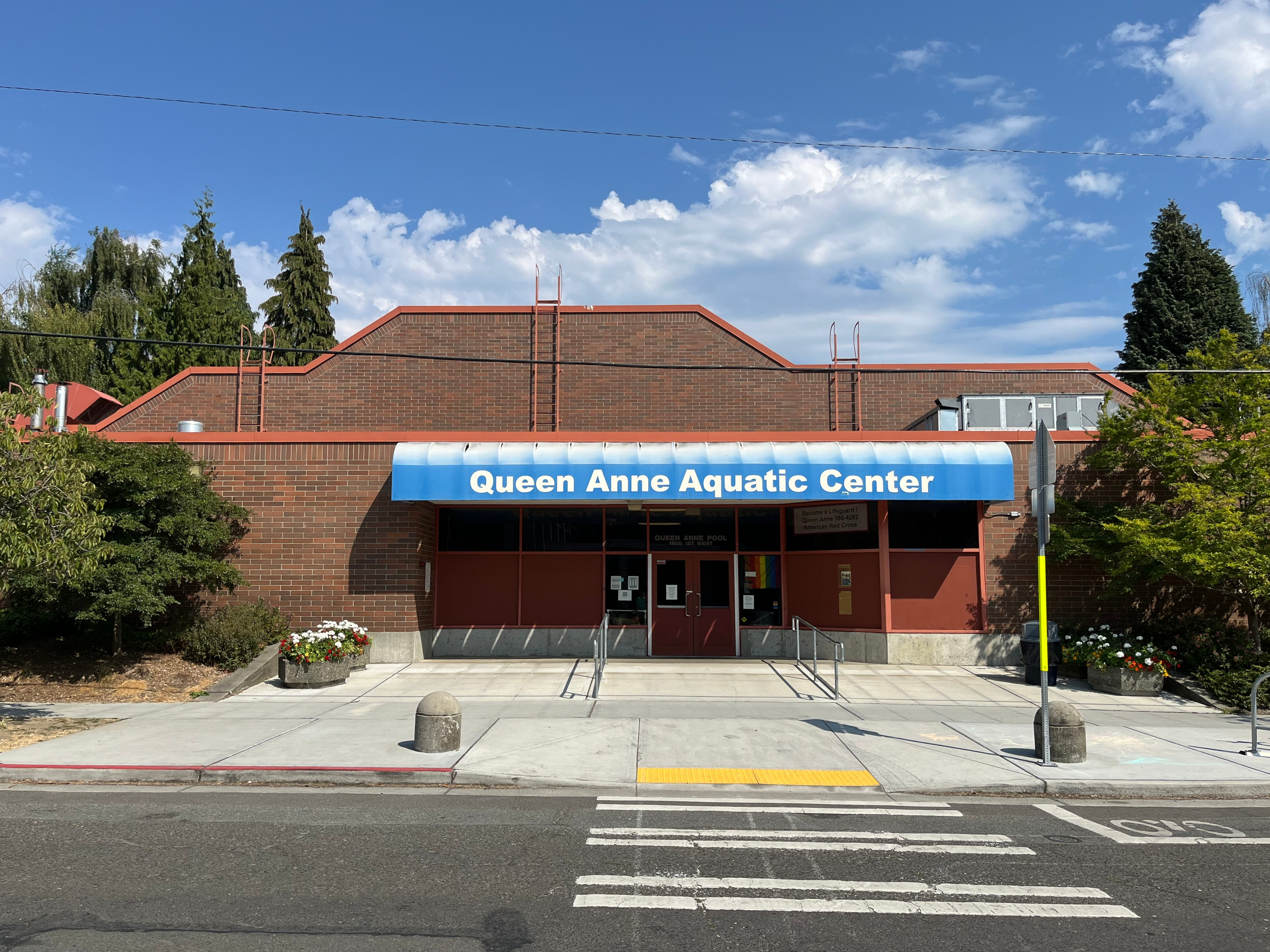
McAdoo designed the Queen Anne Pool (built 1977).

Upon returning to Seattle in 1964, McAdoo and his family initially lived in an apartment atop his offices in Capitol Hill. After a difficult housing search held back by redlining practices and seller's discrimination, they moved to the Hilltop Community in Bellevue, Washington, where they lived in a home designed by Paul Hayden Kirk.

McAdoo continued his work with the General Services Administration at its Auburn offices, with his private architectural practice as a secondary job. In the late 1960s, he returned to private practice full-time, specializing in civic and educational buildings. His projects during the late 1960s and 1970s include the Southcenter Blood Bank, the University of Washington Ethnic Cultural Center, and a warehouse complex at the Naval Submarine Base Bangor. He designed the Queen Anne Pool in 1974–1978 as part of the Forward Thrust development project. Among his last designs was the Creston-Nelson Substation for Seattle City Light, which was built in 1979–1981.

McAdoo worked up until his death on June 18, 1981. His funeral was held at Green Lake Seventh-day Adventist Church. After his death, architects Garold Malcolm and Richard Youel continued his firm for about twenty years under the name "McAdoo, Malcolm and Youel". The firm was responsible for designing the Des Moines Library, which opened in 1988.

== Personal life and political ventures ==
Washington House of Representatives member Charles M. Stokes, a Republican, declined to run for reelection in order to pursue a State Senate office in 1954. He was first elected to his seat in 1950 for the 37th District, a district containing Seattle's predominantly black neighborhoods. He became the first African-American state representative from King County. Seeking to fill Stokes' now-vacant seat, McAdoo ran as a Democrat on a civil rights platform, advocating the elimination of sales taxes on food and clothing, greater funding for public schools, and support for the United Nations. He placed second in the district's Democratic primaries, behind Fred H. Dore. This allowed McAdoo to advance to the general election.

The third place candidate, Paul Revelle, disputed the results; McAdoo had listed his office as his address for the election, but his Montlake residence was outside of the district. McAdoo's lawyers pointed to the large numbers of voters registered to districts they did not live in. A superior court judge ruled that although many voters were indeed registered to other districts, McAdoo was ineligible to run in the 37th district. He appealed the decision to the Washington Supreme Court, which maintained the ruling. McAdoo's attorneys attributed the ruling to anti-Black discrimination on the part of the Democratic party. In 1964, he was elected president of the Seattle chapter of the NAACP; he would serve as chapter president until 1968. He began hosting a weekly KUOW-FM radio show in 1964 to discuss racial issues.

McAdoo was a member of a variety of architectural and civic organizations, including the American Institute of Architects, the National Council of Architectural Registration Boards, the National Organization for Minority Architects, the Seattle Metropolitan Chamber of Commerce, and the Society of American Military Engineers. He was a board member of the King County Central Blood Bank, the Seattle Environmental Review Committee, the University of Washington's Educational Opportunity Program, and the board of trustees of Walla Walla College. McAdoo and his wife had two daughters and a son.

== Works ==
Select designs by Benjamin F. McAdoo
Name	Location	Date	Ref.
John P. Browning House	Madrona, Seattle, Washington	1947	
Moorhouse Residence	3037 37th Avenue W, Seattle, Washington	1948–1949	
Ben-Mar Apartments	315 23rd Ave E, Seattle, Washington	1949–1950	
House of Merit (around 80 built)	Various locations in Seattle, Washington	1950–1953	
George Hage House	Burien, Washington	1955	
Ota Residence	10300 61st Avenue S, Seattle, Washington	1955–1956	
McAdoo House	17823 88th Avenue NE, Bothell, Washington	1957–1958	
Four Seas Restaurant	413 8th Avenue S, Chinatown–International District, Seattle, Washington	1962	
Pagoda of Medicine	Riverside Hospital, Nashville, Tennessee	1963	
Seattle Fire Station No. 29	2139 Ferry Ave SW, Seattle, Washington	1969–1972	
King County Central Blood Bank, Southcenter Branch	130 Andover Park E, Tukwila, Washington	1970	
Samuel E. Kelly Ethnic Cultural Center	3931 Brooklyn Ave NE, Seattle, Washington	1970–1972	
Seattle First National Bank, Wedgwood Branch	8405 35th Ave NE, Seattle, Washington	1972	
Trident Warehouse	Naval Submarine Base Bangor, Bangor, Washington	1975	
Queen Anne Pool	1920 1st Ave W, Seattle, Washington	1974–1977	
Seattle City Light, Creston-Nelson Substation	5300 South Bangor Street, Seattle, Washington	1979–1981	

== See also ==
- African-American architects

== Notes ==
=== Bibliography ===
- Cottrell-Crawford, Penelope; Heuser, Tom (2023). "McAdoo House, Bothell". Docomomo US Western Washington.
- Drosendahl, Glenn (November 30, 2016). "Des Moines Library, King County Library System". HistoryLink.
- Dunham, Sandy Deneau (September 9, 2022a). "Benjamin F. McAdoo's Lasting Legacy as an Architect and Activist". Pacific NW Magazine. The Seattle Times.
- Dunham, Sandy Deneau (September 9, 2022b). "Benjamin F. McAdoo Jr., NW Modernism and Midcentury Design Coverage". Pacific NW Magazine. The Seattle Times.
- Houser, Michael (n.d.). "Benjamin F. McAdoo Jr". Docomomo US Western Washington.
- Lee, Casey (2022). "Race, Religion, Healthcare, and Architecture: Benjamin McAdoo's Pagoda of Medicine". Arris. 33: 60–70. doi:10.1353/arr.2022.0000.
- Mahmoud, Jessica (June 1, 2022). "Benjamin F. McAdoo Jr". Black Arts Legacies. Crosscut.
- Michelson, Alan (2012). "Benjamin F., Jr., and Thelma McAdoo House". SAH Archipedia. Society of Architectural Historians.
- Michelson, Alan (n.d.). "Benjamin Franklin McAdoo Jr. (Architect)". Pacific Coast Architecture Database (PCAD). University of Washington.
- Mumford, Esther Hall (2014). "Benjamin F. McAdoo Jr.". In Ochsner, Jeffery Karl (ed.). Shaping Seattle Architecture: A Historical Guide to the Architects (2nd ed.). University of Washington Press. ISBN 9780295806891. JSTOR j.ctvcwnd1m.
- Ochsner, Jeffery Karl (2017). "The Emergence of Regional Modernism in Seattle Architecture: From the 1930s to the 1950s". Pacific Northwest Quarterly. 108 (1): 12–28. JSTOR 44790797.
- Sprague, Tyler S. (2022). "Working at the Intersection of Equity & Architecture: The Contributions of Benjamin McAdoo, Jr" (PDF). Columbia: The Magazine of Northwest History. 36 (4): 20–27.
- Williams, Kelsey Rose (January 15, 2021). "Benjamin McAdoo: A Modernist Architect of Merit". Arcade. Archived from the original on October 19, 2021.
- Wooten, Andre (January 18, 2007). "Charles Moorehead Stokes (1903–1996)". BlackPast.
- "Benjamin F. McAdoo Papers, 1940–1981". Archives West. 2023.
- "Top Architect McAdoo Dies". Seattle Post-Intelligencer. June 19, 1981.
- "Benjamin McAdoo, Jr., Dies; Service Monday". The Seattle Times. June 20, 1981.
