= Ephraim Kingsbury Avery =

American Methodist minister

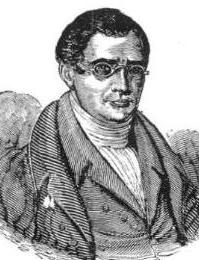
Illustrated portrait of Ephraim Kingsbury Avery, from Avery's book, The correct, full and impartial report of the trial of Rev. Ephraim K. Avery, 1833.

Ephraim Kingsbury Avery (December 18, 1799 – October 23, 1869) was a Methodist minister who was among the first clergymen tried for murder in the United States. Avery is often cited as "the first", although it is thought there is at least one case that precedes Avery's.

== The murder ==
On December 21, 1832, farmer John Durfee of Tiverton, Rhode Island, discovered a woman's corpse hanging by her neck from a rope tied to a stackpole used to dry hay. Investigators identified the woman as 30-year-old factory worker Sarah Maria Cornell, of Fall River, Massachusetts. The family from whom Sarah Cornell rented a room discovered among her personal effects a note written by Cornell and dated the same day as her death:

"If I should be missing, enquire of the Rev. Mr. Avery of Bristol, he will know where I am."

Other suspicious and incriminating letters came to light, as well as a conversation she had had with a doctor indicating the married Avery was the father of her unborn child. A coroner's jury was convened in Tiverton before any autopsy had been performed. This jury found that Cornell had "committed suicide by hanging herself upon a stake ... and was influenced to commit said crime by the wicked conduct of a married man."

After the autopsy was performed, however, it was discovered that Cornell had been four months pregnant at the time of her death. A second coroner's jury was convened, this time in Bristol, Rhode Island. This jury overruled the earlier finding of suicide and accused Ephraim Kingsbury Avery, a married Methodist minister, as the "principal or accessory" in her death. Avery was quickly arrested on a charge of murder, but just as quickly set free on his own recognizance.

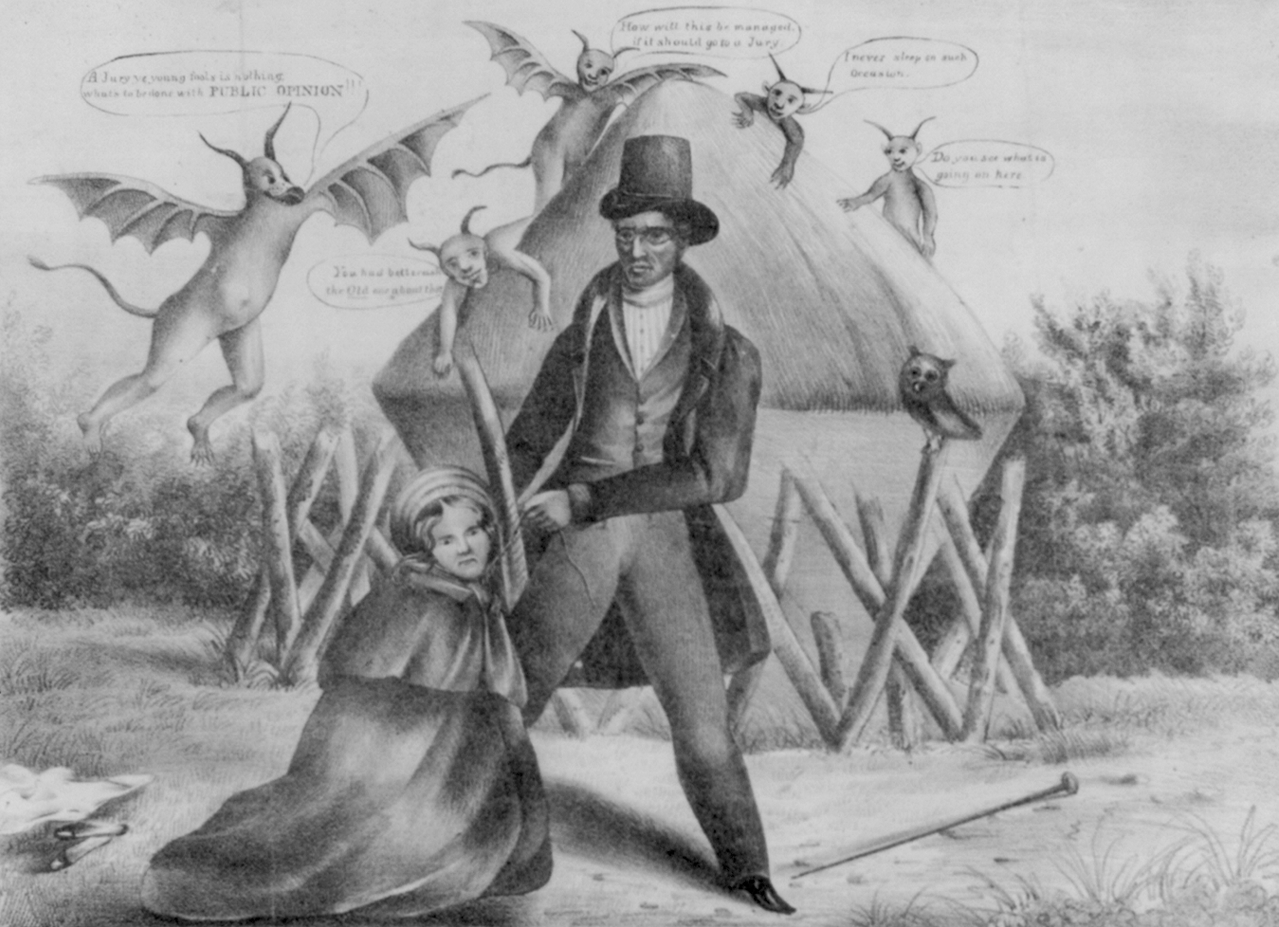
An 1833 print illustrating the widely held belief that Avery was guilty despite his acquittal. One demon asks, "How will this be managed if it should go to a jury?" Another replies, "A Jury, ye young fools, is nothing. What's to be done with Public Opinion."

Cornell's pregnancy led another Methodist minister to reject the responsibility of burying her the second time (she already once been exhumed for autopsy). He claimed that she had only been a "probationary" member of his congregation. Responsibility for her burial was assumed by the Fall River Congregationalists, and Cornell was buried as an indigent, on Christmas Eve. That night in Fall River, money was raised and two committees pledged to assist the officials of Tiverton with the murder investigation. The next day (Christmas being not widely celebrated in largely Puritan New England), a steamship was chartered to take one hundred men from Fall River to Bristol. They surrounded Avery's home and demanded he come out. Avery declined, but did send a friend outside to try to placate the crowd. The men eventually left when the steamship signaled its return to Fall River.

In Bristol, an inquest was convened, in which two Justices of the Peace found there to be insufficient evidence to try Avery for the crime of murder. The people of Fall River were outraged, and there were rumors that one of the justices was a Methodist, and was looking to quell the scandal. The deputy sheriff of Fall River, Harvey Harnden, obtained from a Rhode Island superior court judge a warrant for Avery's arrest. When a Rhode Island sheriff went to serve it, he discovered that Avery had already fled.

On January 20, 1833, Harnden tracked Avery to Rindge, New Hampshire. Avery later claimed he had fled because he feared for his life, particularly at the hands of the mob that had surrounded his house. Harnden extradited Avery to Newport, Rhode Island, where Avery was put in jail. On March 8, 1833, Avery was indicted for murder by a Newport County grand jury. He pleaded "not guilty".

== Media and public opinion ==
There were a great deal of external concerns interested in the case of the young Methodist girl who had been employed at the Fall River Manufactory. For one, New England Protestantism was suspicious of the encroachment of the comparatively new sect of Methodism, and the trial seemed to confirm their worst fears. Another was the 19th-century American industrialists whose cotton mills relied on the labor of young, newly independent women. The case of Sarah Cornell cast into doubt the industrialists' assertion that women would be as safe in the factories as they were working at home with their families.

It was therefore in the interest of the factory-owners to keep Cornell from being smeared in the press, and to push for the arrest and conviction of her murderer. Conversely, the Methodist Church wanted to earn respectability and make converts, and wanted to avoid at all costs a criminal and sexual scandal involving one of its own ministers. Consequently, both of these groups contributed a great deal of effort, money and publicity to the trial, for either the prosecution's side or the defense.

== Trial ==
The trial began on May 6, 1833, and was heard by the Supreme Judicial Council (what is today the Rhode Island Supreme Court). The lawyers for the prosecution were Rhode Island Attorney General Albert C. Greene and former attorney general Dutee Jerauld Pearce. The six lawyers for the defense, hired by the Methodist Church, were led by former United States Senator and New Hampshire Attorney General Jeremiah Mason.

The trial lasted 27 days. Under Rhode Island law at the time, defendants in capital cases were not permitted to offer testimony in their own defense, so Avery did not get the opportunity to speak. However, both the prosecution and the defense called a large number of witnesses to testify, 68 for the prosecution, and 128 for the defense.

Although Jeremiah Mason maintained that Avery had not been present when the murder occurred, the larger part of the defense strategy was to call into question Sarah Cornell's morals. The defense characterized her as "utterly abandoned, unprincipled, profligate," and brought forth many witnesses to testify to her promiscuity, suicidal ideation and mental instability. Much was made of how Cornell had been cast out of the Methodist Church for fornication.

Sarah Maria Cornell had come from a fairly prosperous and prominent Connecticut family, but had fallen on hard times after her father, a successful paper cutter, had abandoned them. In her late teens and twenties, Cornell went back and forth between factory work and skilled employment as a seamstress. She acquired a reputation for petty theft and general "bad character". She moved from town to town in New England, engaging in several affairs along the way, and once contracting gonorrhea.

The prosecution largely attempted to portray the Methodist clergy as a dangerous, almost secret society, willing to defend their minister and the good name of their church at any cost.

A medical debate centered around whether the unborn child was in fact conceived in August, although Puritan standards of propriety regarding the female body sometimes made it difficult to elicit factual information. One female witness, when questioned as to the state of Cornell's body, absolutely refused to answer, saying, "I never heard such questions asked of nobody."

== Acquittal and aftermath ==
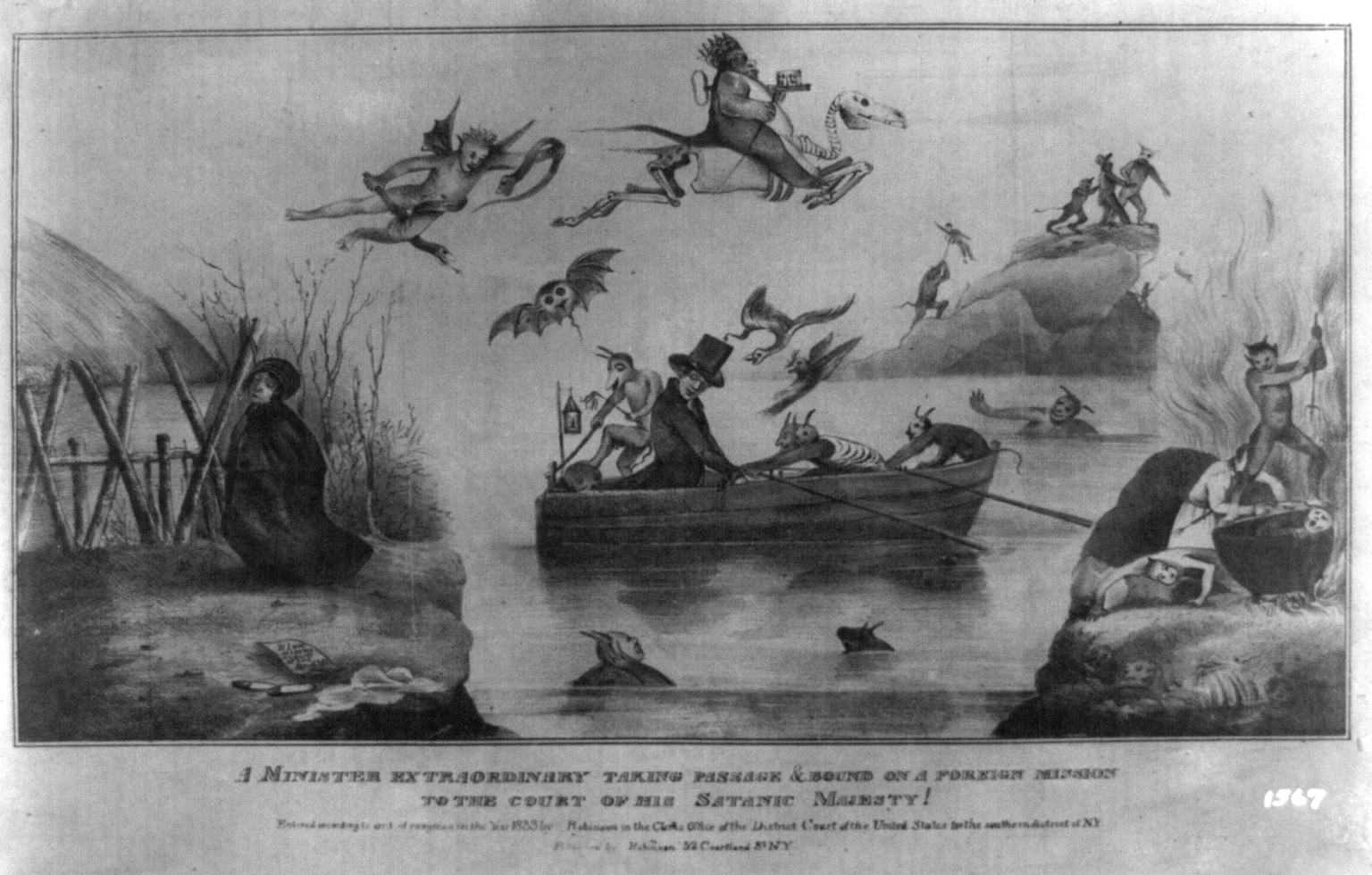
1833 print depicting Avery being transported to hell by demons.

On June 2, 1833, after deliberating for 16 hours, the jury found Ephraim Kingsbury Avery "not guilty". The minister was set free and returned to his position in the Methodist Church, but the public opinion was that Avery had been wrongfully acquitted. Rallies hanged or burned effigies of Avery, and he himself was once almost lynched in Boston. A great deal of anger was also directed at the Methodist Church. To ease tensions, the church's New England Conference convened a trial of its own, chaired by Wilbur Fisk, in which Avery was again acquitted. This did little, if anything, to quell public antipathy toward Avery or the church.

Avery later embarked on a speaking tour to vindicate himself in the eyes of the public, but his efforts were largely unsuccessful. In 1836, Avery left the Methodist ministry, and took his family first to Connecticut, then upstate New York. They ultimately settled in Ohio, where he lived out the rest of his days as a farmer. Avery also wrote a pamphlet called The correct, full and impartial report of the trial of Rev. Ephraim K. Avery.
