= Queen Anne Community Center =

Community center in Seattle, Washington, U.S.

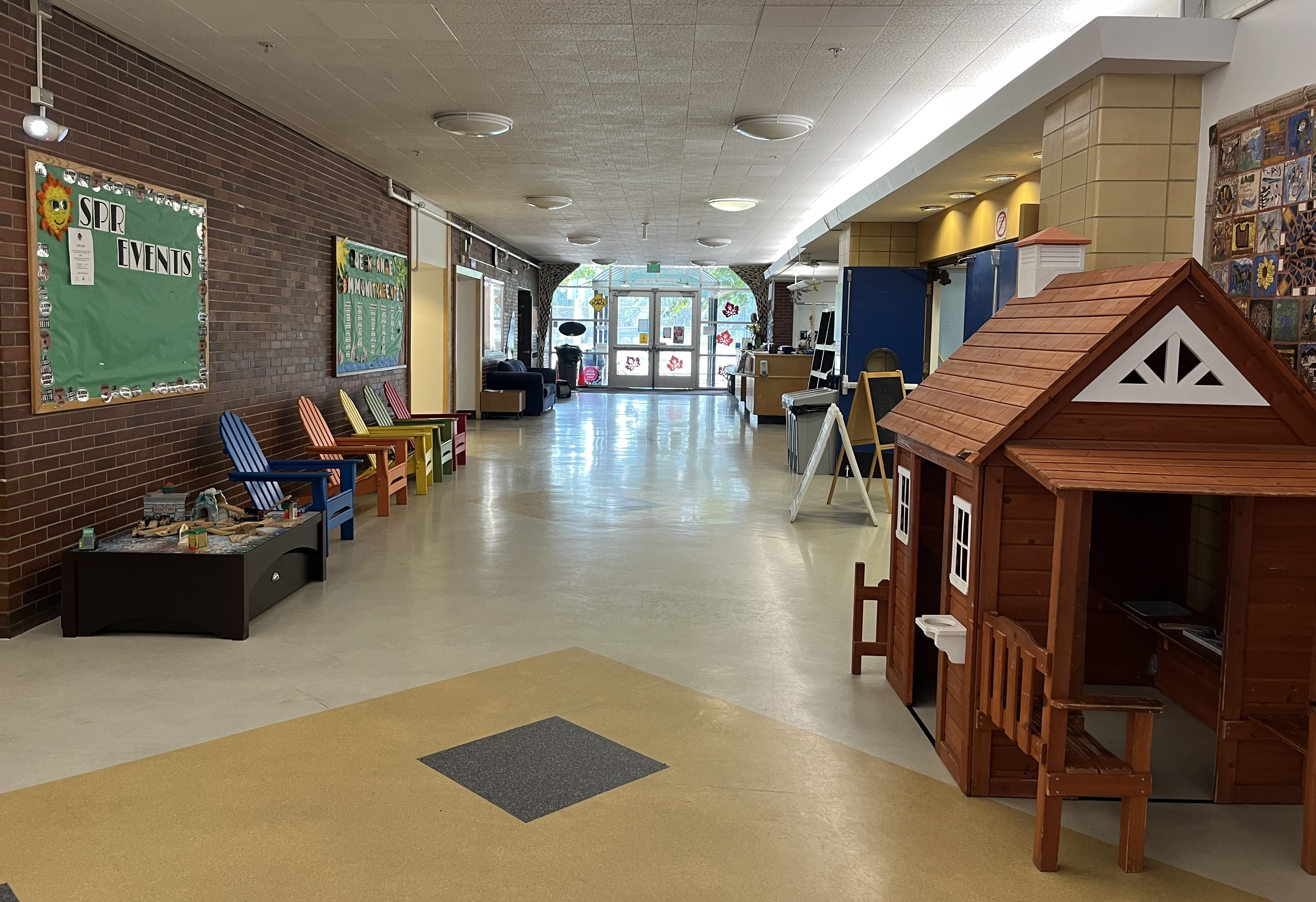
- The center's interior, 2024
- Interactive map of the Queen Anne Community Center area

General information
- Location: 1901 1st Avenue W, Seattle, Washington, U.S.
- Coordinates: 47.6362°N 122.3588°W

The Queen Anne Community Center is a community center in Seattle's Queen Anne neighborhood, in the U.S. state of Washington. It has a fitness center, an indoor pool, and a playground. It has hosted child care and various activities such as an egg hunt, storytelling, and the annual dance event Thrill the World.

Michael McGinn had proposed a plan to rent out the center's gym to the television series Biz Kids, which is about financial literacy.
