= Sarah Maria Cornell =

American murder victim

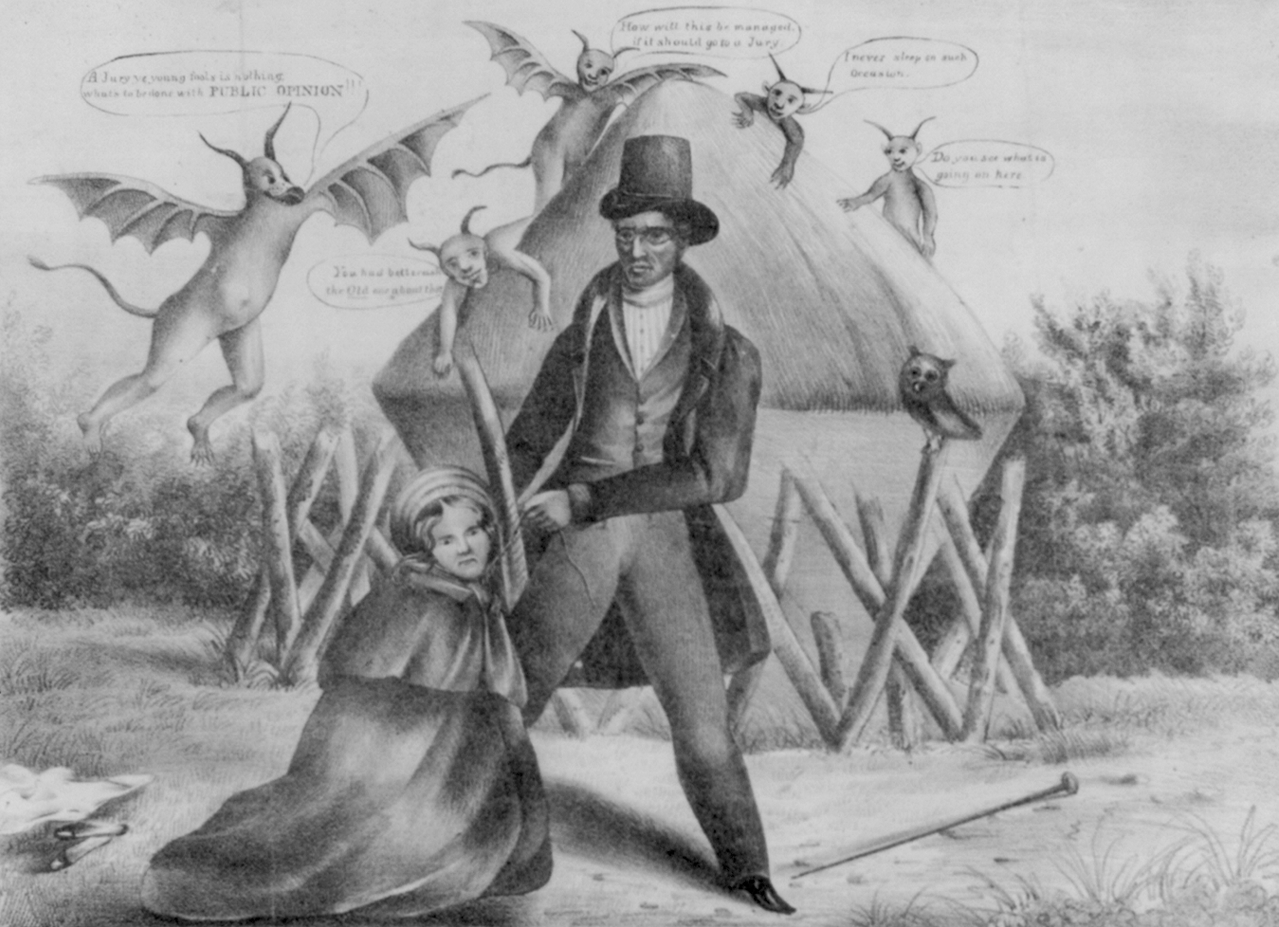
An 1833 print illustrating the widely held belief that Avery was guilty of the murder of Sarah M. Cornell, despite his acquittal.

Sarah Maria Cornell (May 3, 1803 – December 20, 1832) was a Fall River, Massachusetts, mill worker whose corpse was found hanging from a stackpole on the farm of John Durfee in nearby Tiverton, Rhode Island on December 21, 1832. Her death was at first thought to be a suicide. After an autopsy, it was discovered she was pregnant. Methodist minister Ephraim K. Avery would be suspected of her pregnancy and tried for her murder, in a trial that would engage local industrialists against the New England Conference of the Methodist Episcopal Church. Although Avery would be acquitted for the murder, he was forever scorned in the eyes of the public.

== Biography ==
Sarah Maria Cornell was born on May 3, 1803, likely in Rupert, Vermont to James and Lucretia (Leffingwell) Cornell. Lucretia had been born well-off in an old Puritan family, the daughter of a Connecticut merchant and paper maker. However she had been disowned by her father after she married James Cornell, who had worked in his paper mill, and of whom he did not approve. James abandoned the family when Cornell was a baby, forcing her mother to give up her older sister and brother to relatives as she was financially unable to care for three children. Cornell remained with her mother to age eleven when she moved in with her aunt Joanna, in Norwich, Connecticut. Later in her teens, she apprenticed as a tailor. In 1820 she moved to nearby Bozrahville and worked as a tailor for about two years.

Around 1822 or 1823 she went to work at a cotton mill in Killingly, Connecticut. In the years that followed, she would move often and work at various mills in Rhode Island and Connecticut, including stints in North Providence, Jewett City, Slatersville. During this period, Cornell often got into trouble, including charges of theft and other "inappropriate" acts for a woman of that time.

During her time at Slatersville between 1823 and 1826, Cornell converted to Methodism, and sought to change her ways. However, in February 1826, the mill at Slatersville burned to the ground and she was forced to seek employment elsewhere. She first moved to the nearby village of Branch Factory and later to Mendon Mills (later called Millville, Massachusetts), several miles away.

In early 1827, Cornell moved again to find mill work in Dedham, Massachusetts. However, after only a few weeks there she moved again to Dorchester, Massachusetts, where she was able to reconnect with the Methodists. In May 1828, she moved to the booming mill town of Lowell, Massachusetts where she worked as a weaver until about the end of 1829. It was during this period in Lowell that she met a newly arrived Methodist minister, Ephraim Kingsbury Avery.

In September 1830, she moved to Dover, New Hampshire. Only two months later she moved again to Somersworth, New Hampshire. During the summer of 1831 she left New Hampshire for Waltham, Massachusetts but only stayed there a few weeks. She then moved to Taunton, Massachusetts where she found employment. In May 1832 she left Taunton for Woodstock, Connecticut where she was able to find work again as a tailor in Grindall Rawson's shop. It was at a Methodist Camp Meeting in Thompson, Connecticut at the end of August 1832 that Cornell once again crossed paths with Reverend Avery. By this time, Avery had become the minister in Bristol, Rhode Island. It is alleged that during the Thompson Camp meeting that Avery seduced Sarah Cornell.

In October 1832, she moved to Fall River where she found lodging at the home of Elija Cole. By this time she was showing clear signs of pregnancy, and sought advice from a local doctor in Fall River. By early December 1832, she moved to the Hathaway residence on Spring Street.

== Death ==
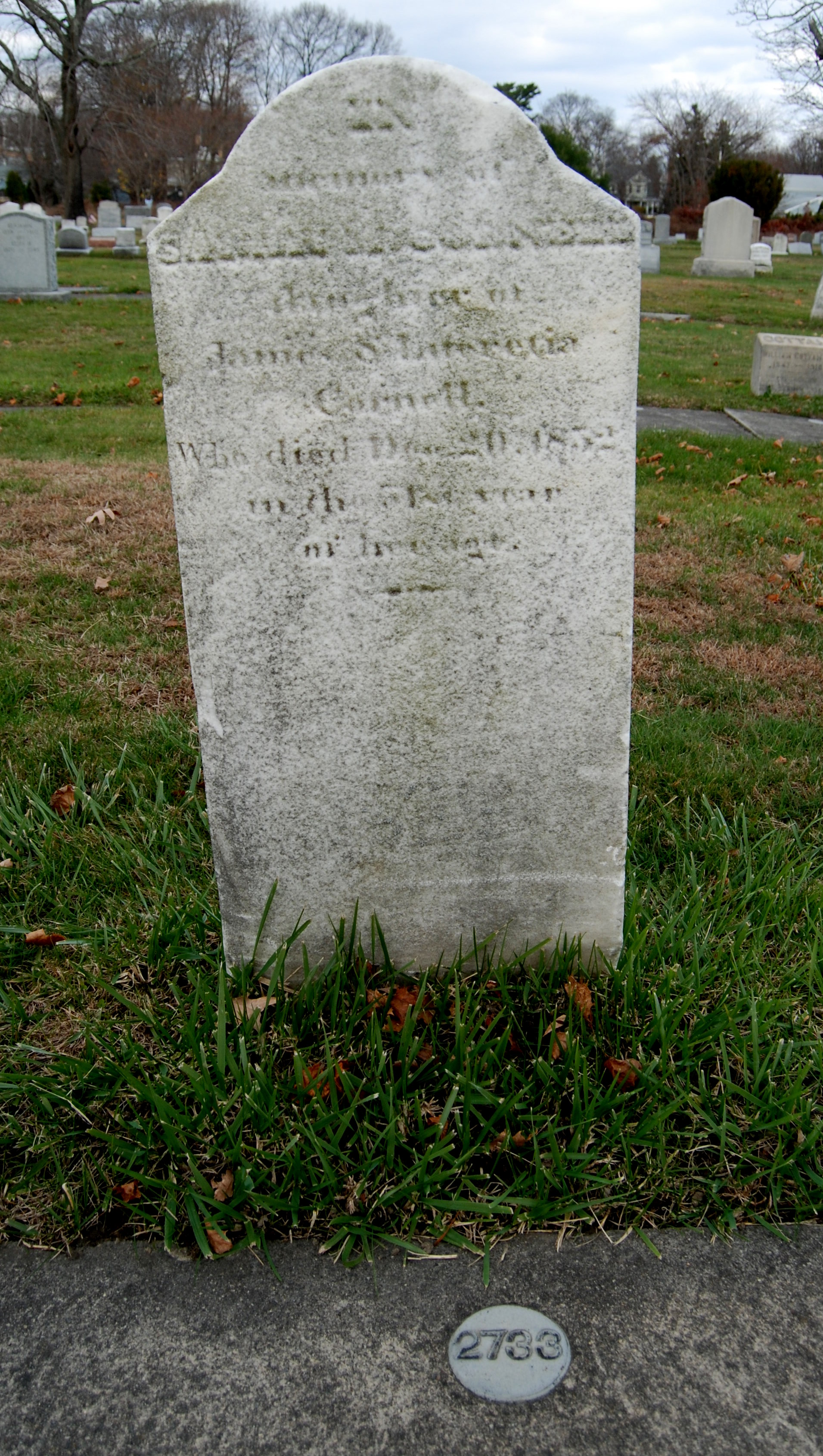
Grave of Sarah M. Cornell, Oak Grove Cemetery in Fall River, Massachusetts.

On the morning of December 21, 1832, Cornell's body was found by farmer John Durfee quickly identified by the minister. Later discovered among her personal effects at the Hathaway residence was a note written by Cornell and dated the same day as her death:

"If I should be missing, enquire of the Rev. Mr. Avery of Bristol, he will know where I am."

Other suspicious and incriminating letters were also discovered, as well as a conversation she had had with a doctor indicating the married Avery was the father of her unborn child. A coroner's jury was convened in Tiverton before any autopsy had been performed. This jury found that Cornell had "committed suicide by hanging herself upon a stake ... and was influenced to commit said crime by the wicked conduct of a married man."

After the autopsy was performed, it was discovered that Cornell had been four months pregnant at the time of her death. A second coroner's jury was convened, this time in Bristol, Rhode Island. This jury overruled the earlier finding of suicide and accused Ephraim Kingsbury Avery, a married Methodist minister, as the "principal or accessory" in her death. Avery was quickly arrested on a charge of murder, but just as quickly set free on his own recognizance.

Cornell's pregnancy led another Methodist minister to reject the responsibility of burying her the second time (she already once been exhumed for autopsy). He claimed that she had only been a "probationary" member of his congregation. Responsibility for her burial was assumed by the Fall River Congregationalists, and Cornell was buried as an indigent, on Christmas Eve. That night, in Fall River, money was raised and two committees pledged to assist the officials of Tiverton with the murder investigation. The next day, a steamship was chartered to take one hundred men from Fall River to Bristol. They surrounded Avery's home and demanded he come out. Avery declined, but did send a friend outside to try to placate the crowd. The men eventually left when the steamship signaled its return to Fall River.

In Bristol, an inquest was convened, in which two Justices of the Peace found there to be insufficient evidence to try Avery for the crime of murder. The people of Fall River were outraged, and there were rumors that one of the justices was a Methodist, and was looking to quell the scandal. The deputy sheriff of Fall River, Harvey Harnden, obtained from a Rhode Island superior court judge a warrant for Avery's arrest. When a Rhode Island sheriff went to serve it, he discovered that Avery had already fled.

On January 20, 1833, Harnden tracked Avery to Rindge, New Hampshire. Avery later claimed he had fled because he feared for his life, particularly at the hands of the mob that had surrounded his house. Harnden extradited Avery to Newport, Rhode Island, where Avery was put in jail. On March 8, 1833, Avery was indicted for murder by a Newport County grand jury. He pleaded "not guilty".

== Trial ==
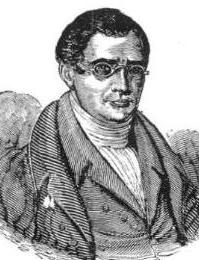
Illustrated portrait of Ephraim Kingsbury Avery, 1833.

The trial began in Newport, Rhode Island on May 6, 1833, and was heard by the Supreme Judicial Council. The lawyers for the prosecution were Rhode Island Attorney General Albert C. Greene and former attorney general Dutee Jerauld Pearce. The six lawyers for the defense, hired by the Methodist Church, were led by former United States Senator and New Hampshire Attorney General Jeremiah Mason.

The trial lasted 27 days. Under Rhode Island law at the time, defendants in capital cases were not permitted to offer testimony in their own defense, so Avery did not get the opportunity to speak. However, both the prosecution and the defense called a large number of witnesses to testify, 68 for the prosecution, and 128 for the defense.

Although the defense maintained that Avery had not been present when the murder occurred, the larger part of the defense strategy was to call into question Cornell's morals. The defense characterized her as "utterly abandoned, unprincipled, profligate," and brought forth many witnesses to testify to her promiscuity, suicidal ideation and mental instability. Much was made of how Cornell had been cast out of the Methodist Church for fornication.

The prosecution largely attempted to portray the Methodist clergy as a dangerous, almost secret society, willing to defend their minister and the good name of their church at any cost.

A medical debate centered around whether the unborn child was in fact conceived in August, although Puritan standards of propriety regarding the female body sometimes made it difficult to elicit factual information. One female witness, when questioned as to the state of Cornell's body, absolutely refused to answer, saying, "I never heard such questions asked of nobody."

On June 2, 1833, after deliberating for 16 hours, the jury found Ephraim Kingsbury Avery "not guilty". The minister was set free and returned to his position in the Methodist Church, but the public opinion was that Avery had been wrongfully acquitted. Rallies hanged or burned effigies of Avery, and he himself was once almost lynched in Boston. A great deal of anger was also directed at the Methodist Church. To ease tensions, the church's New England Conference convened a trial of its own, chaired by Wilbur Fisk, in which Avery was again acquitted. This did little, if anything, to quell public antipathy toward Avery or the church.

Avery later embarked on a speaking tour to vindicate himself in the eyes of the public, but his efforts were largely unsuccessful. In 1836, Avery left the Methodist ministry, and took his family first to Connecticut, then upstate New York. They ultimately settled in Ohio, where he lived out the rest of his days as a farmer. Avery also wrote a pamphlet called The correct, full and impartial report of the trial of Rev. Ephraim K. Avery. He died on October 23, 1869.

== Legacy ==
Cornell's body was originally buried on the farm near where her body was found. However, years later it was moved to Plot 2733 on Whitethorn Path at Oak Grove Cemetery when the farm became South Park.

The story of Cornell's death and the ensuing trial were the subject of the 1833 book Fall River: An Authentic Narrative by Catharine Williams and the 2025 book The Sinners All Bow by Kate Winkler Dawson, as well as the 2001 academic paper 'The Scarlet Letter' and the 1833 Murder Trial of the Reverend Ephraim Avery by Kristin Boudreau. Both Dawson and Boudreau found parallels between Cornell and Rev. Avery and The Scarlet Letter characters Hester Prynne and Arthur Dimmesdale.
