= Overloading =

The term overloading may refer to:

- Function overloading, a software engineering process whereby multiple functions of different types are defined with the same name
- Operator overloading, a software engineering process whereby operators (e.g. + or -) are treated as polymorphic functions having different behaviors depending on the types of arguments used
- Overloading (chess), a tactical theme arising out of an opponent piece performing more than one defensive task in the game
- Overloading, in weight training, refers to performing exercises with higher resistance than the muscles can handle, causing microtrauma which leads to hypertrophy, or muscle growth

== See also ==
- Overload (disambiguation)
- Overlay (disambiguation)
- Overlap (disambiguation)
