= Overton =

Overton may refer to:

== Places ==
=== Canada ===
- Overton, Nova Scotia

=== United Kingdom ===
- Overton, Aberdeen
- Overton, Frodsham, in Cheshire
- Overton, Malpas, Cheshire
- Overton, Gloucestershire
- Overton, Greenock, Inverclyde
- Overton, Hampshire
- Overton, Lancashire
  - Overton (ward)
- Overton, North Yorkshire
- Overton, Shropshire
- Overton, Staffordshire
- Overton, Swansea
- Overton, West Yorkshire
- Overton, a settlement in Cunninghamhead, Perceton and Annick Lodge, Ayrshire
- Overton, an area of Halfway, South Lanarkshire
- Overton Down, an experimental archaeology site
- Overton or Overton-on-Dee, Wrexham
- Cold Overton, Leicestershire
- Market Overton, Rutland
- West Overton, Wiltshire

=== United States ===
- Overton, Missouri
- Overton, Nebraska
- Overton, Nevada
- Overton, Ohio
- Overton, Texas
- Overton, Virginia
- Overton County, Tennessee
- Overton Township, Pennsylvania
- West Overton, Pennsylvania

== Railway stations ==
- Overton railway station, Overton, Hampshire, England
- Ferry Meadows railway station, originally and currently known as Overton station, Peterborough, England
- Overton railway station, New Zealand, a defunct station in the Manawatū-Whanganui region

== Other ==
- Overton (name), including a list of people with the name
- Overton Arcade, shopping arcade in Wrexham, Wales
- Overton Formation, England
- Overton Islands (Nevada), United States
- Overton Period in British archaeology
- Overton Prize in computational biology
- Overton window, a concept in political theory
- USS Overton (DD-239), a World War II US Navy destroyer

== See also ==
- Overtones (disambiguation)
- Overtown (disambiguation)
