= Overtones (disambiguation) =

Overtones may refer to:

- Overtone, a frequency higher than the fundamental frequency of a sound
- Overtone band in spectroscopy, at a frequency higher than the fundamental band
- Overtone (software), an open source audio programming environment based on Clojure and SuperCollider synthesis engine
- Overtones (album), an album by Just Jack
- The Overtones, a British doo-wop band
- California Golden Overtones, a collegiate a cappella group
- Rustic Overtones, a rock/jazz/funk band from Maine, United States
- "Strange Overtones", a song by David Byrne and Brian Eno
- Overtone (musical group), an a cappella group from South Africa
- Overtone, a type of poem writing like that of an autobiographical overtone.

== See also ==
- Overton (disambiguation)
- Overtown (disambiguation)
- Over (disambiguation)
- Tone (disambiguation)
