= Superposition (disambiguation) =

A superposition is a linear combination in mathematics. It can also refer to:

== Math and science ==
=== Math, electrical engineering and quantum physics ===
- The superposition principle of linear differential equations (LDEs), that a linear combination of solutions to an LDE is itself another solution
  - Superposition theorem, for electric circuits
  - Quantum superposition, in quantum physics
- The Kolmogorov–Arnold superposition theorem, representing a multivariate function as a superposition of univariate functions
- Superposition calculus, used in logic for equational first-order reasoning

=== Chemistry ===
- Dalton's law

=== Geology ===
- Law of superposition in geology and archaeology

=== Political science ===
- Superposition or parallel voting, a mixture of two electoral systems that do not interact

== Music and art ==
- "Superposition", a song by Young the Giant from the 2018 album Mirror Master
- "Superposition", a song by Daniel Caesar from the 2019 album Case Study 01
- In music theory, "reaching over"

== See also ==
- Superimposition (disambiguation)
- Overlay (disambiguation)
- Overlap (disambiguation)
