= Layover (disambiguation) =

A layover is a point where a vehicle stops, with passengers possibly changing vehicle.

Layover may also refer to:

- Layover (novel), a 1999 novel by Lisa Zeidner
- The Layover (TV series), an American travel and food show
- The Layover EP, a 2008 hip-hop EP by Evidence
- Layover (EP), a 2023 pop jazz EP by V
- The Layover (film), a 2017 film directed by William H. Macy
- "Layover" (Soulmates), a 2020 television episode
- Layover, alternative title for the 2012 tele-movie Abducted with Lauren Holly

== See also ==
- Overlay (disambiguation)
- Over (disambiguation)
- Lay (disambiguation)
