= Stepover (disambiguation) =

Stepover or step over may refer to:

- Fault stepover, term from strike-slip tectonics
- Stepover toehold, wrestling hold
- Stepover, an espalier design in horticulture
- Step over, football dribbling move

== See also ==
- Stepove (disambiguation)
- Stopover (disambiguation)
