= Overload =

Overload or overloaded may refer to:

== Arts and entertainment ==
- Overload (novel), a 1979 novel by Arthur Hailey
- Overload (Teen Titans), a character from the Teen Titans animated series
- Overload (video game), a 2018 first-person shooter game from Revival Productions
- "Overload", an episode from the second season of the television series CSI: Crime Scene Investigation

== Medical ==
- Information overload, having too much information to make a decision or remain informed about a topic
- Iron overload, an accumulation of iron in the body from any cause
- Sensory overload, occurs when one or more of the body's senses experiences over-stimulation from the environment

== Music ==
=== Bands ===
- Overload (Chinese band), a Chinese rock / thrash metal band
- Overload (Pakistani band), a Pakistani rock band from Lahore, Punjab
- Overload (Swedish band), a heavy metal band from Bollnäs, Sweden
- Overload Generation, an English boy band

=== Albums ===
- Overload (Anthem album), a 2000 album by Japanese heavy metal band Anthem
- Overload (Georgia Anne Muldrow album), a 2018 album by American musician Georgia Anne Muldrow
- Overload (Harem Scarem album), a 2005 album by the Canadian hard rock band Harem Scarem
- Overload (Overload album), a 2006 album by Pakistani rock band Overload
- Overloaded: The Singles Collection, a 2006 album by the Sugababes
- Overload (EP), a 2022 extended play by South Korean rock band Xdinary Heroes

=== Songs ===
- "Overload" (John Legend song), a song from the album Darkness and Light (album)
- "Overload" (Dot Rotten song), a 2012 grime/dubstep song by rapper Dot Rotten
- "Overload" (Sugababes song), a 2000 pop song by the UK girl group Sugababes
- "Overload" (Voodoo and Serano song), a 2003 dance song by Voodoo and Serano
- "Overload", a song by Future and Metro Boomin from their 2024 album We Still Don't Trust You
- "Overload", a song by Raven from their 1987 album Life's a Bitch
- "The Overload", a song by Talking Heads from their 1980 album Remain in Light

== Technology ==
- Electrical overload
- Function overloading, the ability to create multiple functions of the same name with different implementations
- Mechanical overload (engineering), when a component is stressed to failure in one event
- Operator overloading, a process where different operators have different implementations depending on their arguments
- Overload (magazine), a software development journal
- Overload protection, for power supplies

== Other uses ==
- Overload (chess)
- Overload (convention), an anime and manga convention held in Auckland, New Zealand
- Operation Overload, a military operation by the Rhodesian Army in 1974

== See also ==
- Maximum Overload (disambiguation)
- Overloading (disambiguation)
- Overlay (disambiguation)
- Overlap (disambiguation)
- Overpower
