= Overtown =

Overtown may refer to:

- Overtown (Miami), a neighborhood of Miami, Florida, United States
- Overtown, Lancashire, England, UK
- Overtown, North Lanarkshire, Scotland, UK
- Overtown, West Yorkshire, England, UK
- Overtown, Wiltshire, England, UK

== See also ==
- Overton (disambiguation)
- Overtones (disambiguation)
- Over (disambiguation)
- Town (disambiguation)
