= Overlay =

Overlay may refer to:

== Computers ==
- Overlay network, a computer network which is built on top of another network
- Video overlay, techniques to display video on computer display
- Hardware overlay, one type of video overlay that uses memory dedicated to the application
- Another term for exec, replacing one process by another
- Overlay (programming), a technique to reduce the amount of memory used by a program
- Overlay keyboard, a specialized keyboard with no pre-set keys
- Keyboard overlay, a sheet of printed text sitting between the keys, depicting an alternate keyboard layout
- Vector overlay, an analysis procedure in a geographic information system for integrating multiple data sets

== Other uses ==
- Overlay architecture, temporary elements that supplement existing buildings and infrastructure for major sporting events or festivals
- Overlay complex, a method of introducing new area codes in telephony
- Overlay control, in semiconductor manufacturing, for monitoring layer-to-layer alignment on multi-layer device structures
- Historic overlay district, a zoning district that applies special rules to a portion of other districts, usually for historic or conservation reasons
- When the payoffs in gambling are greater than the costs; see Advantage gambling

== See also ==
- Layover (disambiguation)
- Over (disambiguation)
- Lay (disambiguation)
- Overlap (disambiguation)
- Overload (disambiguation)
- Superposition (disambiguation)
