= Stopover =

A stopover, or layover, is a break in a journey.

Stopover may also refer to:

- Stopover, Kentucky, United States, an unincorporated community
- The Stopover, a 2016 French film
- "Stopover" (The Professionals), an episode of the television series

== See also ==
- Over (disambiguation)
- Stop (disambiguation)
- Layover (disambiguation)
