= Orthogonality (term rewriting) =

Property of term rewriting systems

Orthogonality as a property of term rewriting systems (TRSs) describes where the reduction rules of the system are all left-linear, that is each variable occurs only once on the left hand side of each reduction rule, and there is no overlap between them, i.e. the TRS has no critical pairs. For example $D(x,x) \to E$ is not left-linear.

Orthogonal TRSs have the consequent property that all reducible expressions (redexes) within a term are completely disjoint—that is, the redexes share no common function symbol.

For example, the TRS with reduction rules
$$\begin{array}{lrcl}
\rho_1:\ & f(x,y) & \rightarrow & g(y) \\
\rho_2:\ & h(y) & \rightarrow & f(g(y), y)
\end{array}$$
is orthogonal—it is easy to observe that each reduction rule is left-linear, and the left hand side of each reduction rule shares no function symbol in common, so there is no overlap.

Orthogonal TRSs are confluent.

== Weak orthogonality ==
A TRS is weakly orthogonal if it is left-linear and contains only trivial critical pairs, i.e. if $(t,s)$ is a critical pair then $t=s$. Weakly orthogonal TRSs are confluent.

A TRS is almost orthogonal if it is weakly orthogonal and has the additional property that overlap between redex occurrences occurs only at the root of the redex occurrences.
