= Superimposition (disambiguation) =

Superimposition is the placement of one thing over another, typically so that both are still evident.

Superimposition or superimposed may also refer to:

- Adhyasa, a Sanskrit term for the superimposition or false attribution of properties of one thing on another thing
- Superimposition (album), an album by American pianist Eddie Palmieri

== See also ==
- Superimposed code
- Superposition (disambiguation)
