= Over church =

Over church may refer to:

- Overchurch, a parish containing Upton, Merseyside, England
- St Chad's Church, Over, in Winsford, Cheshire, England
- St Mary's Church, in Over, Cambridgeshire, England

== See also ==
- Over (disambiguation)
