= Conformal linear transformation =

A conformal linear transformation, also called a homogeneous similarity transformation or homogeneous similitude, is a similarity transformation of a Euclidean or pseudo-Euclidean vector space which fixes the origin. It can be written as the composition of an orthogonal transformation (an origin-preserving rigid transformation) with a uniform scaling (dilation). All similarity transformations (which globally preserve the shape but not necessarily the size of geometric figures) are also conformal (locally preserve shape). Similarity transformations which fix the origin also preserve scalar–vector multiplication and vector addition, making them linear transformations.

Every origin-fixing reflection or dilation is a conformal linear transformation, as is any composition of these basic transformations, including rotations and improper rotations and most generally similarity transformations. However, shear transformations and non-uniform scaling are not. Conformal linear transformations come in two types, proper transformations preserve the orientation of the space whereas improper transformations reverse it.

As linear transformations, conformal linear transformations are representable by matrices once the vector space has been given a basis, composing with each-other and transforming vectors by matrix multiplication. The Lie group of these transformations has been called the conformal orthogonal group, the conformal linear transformation group or the homogeneous similtude group.

Alternatively any conformal linear transformation can be represented as a versor (geometric product of vectors); every versor and its negative represent the same transformation, so the versor group (also called the Lipschitz group) is a double cover of the conformal orthogonal group.

Conformal linear transformations are a special type of Möbius transformations (conformal transformations mapping circles to circles); the conformal orthogonal group is a subgroup of the conformal group.

== General properties ==
Across all dimensions, a conformal linear transformation has the following properties:

- Distance ratios are preserved by the transformation.
- Given an orthonormal basis, a matrix representing the transformation must have each column the same magnitude and each pair of columns must be orthogonal.
- The transformation is conformal (angle preserving); in particular orthogonal vectors remain orthogonal after applying the transformation.
- The transformation maps concentric k-spheres to concentric k-spheres for every k (circles to circles, spheres to spheres, etc.). In particular, k-spheres centered at the origin are mapped to k-spheres centered at the origin.
- By the Cartan–Dieudonné theorem, every orthogonal transformation in an n-dimensional space can be expressed as some composition of up to n reflections. Therefore, every conformal linear transformation can be expressed as the composition of up to n reflections and a dilation. Because every reflection across a hyperplane reverses the orientation of a pseudo-Euclidean space, the composition of any even number of reflections and a dilation by a positive real number is a proper conformal linear transformation, and the composition of any odd number of reflections and a dilation is an improper conformal linear transformation.

== Two dimensions ==
In the Euclidean vector plane, an improper conformal linear transformation is a reflection across a line through the origin composed with a positive dilation. Given an orthonormal basis, it can be represented by a matrix of the form

$$\begin{bmatrix}a&b\\b&-a\end{bmatrix}.$$

A proper conformal linear transformation is a rotation about the origin composed with a positive dilation. It can be represented by a matrix of the form

$$\begin{bmatrix}a&-b\\b&a\end{bmatrix}.$$

Alternately a proper conformal linear transformation can be represented by a complex number of the form $a + bi.$

== Practical applications ==
When composing multiple linear transformations, it is possible to create a shear/skew by composing a parent transform with a non-uniform scale, and a child transform with a rotation. Therefore, in situations where shear/skew is not allowed, transformation matrices must also have uniform scale in order to prevent a shear/skew from appearing as the result of composition. This implies conformal linear transformations are required to prevent shear/skew when composing multiple transformations.

In physics simulations, a sphere (or circle, hypersphere, etc.) is often defined by a point and a radius. Checking if a point overlaps the sphere can therefore be performed by using a distance check to the center. With a rotation or flip/reflection, the sphere is symmetric and invariant, therefore the same check works. With a uniform scale, only the radius needs to be changed. However, with a non-uniform scale or shear/skew, the sphere becomes "distorted" into an ellipsoid, therefore the distance check algorithm does not work correctly anymore.
