= Overlap =

Overlap may refer to:

- In set theory, an overlap of elements shared between sets is called an intersection, as in a Venn diagram.
- In music theory, overlap is a synonym for reinterpretation of a chord at the boundary of two musical phrases
- Overlap (railway signalling), the length of track beyond a stop signal that is proved to be clear of obstructions as a safety margin
- Overlap (road), a place where multiple road numbers overlap
- Overlap (term rewriting), in mathematics, computer science, and logic, a property of the reduction rules in term rewriting systems
- Overlap add, an efficient convolution method using FFT
- Overlap coefficient, a similarity measure between sets
- Orbital overlap, important concept in quantum mechanics describing a type of orbital interaction that affects bond strength
- Overlap, publisher of the light novel series Arifureta: From Commonplace to World's Strongest

Overlapping can refer to:

- "Reaching over", term in Schenkerian theory, see Schenkerian analysis#Lines between voices, reaching over

== See also ==
- Intersection (disambiguation)
- Overlay (disambiguation)
- Overload (disambiguation)
