= Overton (ward) =

- Shown within Hyndburn
- Area: 9.46 km^{2} (3.65 sq mi)
- Population: 6,314 (2011)
  - Density: 667/km^{2} (1,730/sq mi)
- District: Hyndburn
- Ceremonial county: Lancashire
- Region: North West
- Country: England
- Sovereign state: United Kingdom
- UK Parliament: Hyndburn
- Councillors: Stephanie Haworth (Labour); Patrick McGinley (Conservative); Jenny Molineux (Labour)

Overton is one of the 18 electoral wards that form the Parliamentary constituency of Hyndburn, Lancashire, England. The ward returns three councillors to represent western Great Harwood on the Hyndburn Borough Council. As of the May 2019 Council election, Overton had an electorate of 5,076.
