= Maximum Overload (disambiguation) =

Maximum Overload (2014) is the sixth studio album by British power metal band DragonForce.

Maximum Overload may also refer to:

- Lego Marvel Super Heroes: Maximum Overload, an animated Lego film based on Marvel Comics characters
- Maximum Overload (Acid Drinkers album) (2002), first compilation album by Acid Drinkers
