= Layover (novel) =

1999 novel by Lisa Zeidner

- First edition
- Author: Lisa Zeidner
- Language: English
- Genre: tragicomedy, erotica
- Publisher: Random House
- Publication date: 1999
- Publication place: United States
- Pages: 288 pp
- ISBN: 978-0-375-50286-6
- OCLC: 40408903

Layover is a novel by the American writer, Lisa Zeidner, first published in 1999 by Random House. It is one of New York Times' Notable Books of the Year. The novel focuses on the theme of maternal grief.

A film adaptation of Layover was announced in 2016. As of May 2022, the film has not been released.

== Description ==
After her young son is killed in a car accident and her husband, a surgeon, admits during sex to having had an affair, the protagonist Claire Newbold – a successful medical sales representative in her early forties – fails to return home from a business trip. She drifts, staying in hotel rooms without paying, obsessively swimming in their pools and becoming adept at evading both hotel security and her husband's calls. She starts to have sex with a series of strangers, including a youth in his late teens and his father, constructs lies in which her son is still alive, and begins to descend into madness. The novel is written in the first person, with a narrator who is not always reliable.

== Writing and publication ==
Layover has been described by the author and literary agent Donald Maass as Zeidner's "breakout novel". It is her fourth novel, published a decade after her third; Zeidner spent five years writing it, stating that she wanted to create "a smart, middle-aged woman, a grownup". As in some of her other novels, including Customs (1981) and Love Bomb (2012), the protagonist is close to Zeidner's own age at the time of writing. Zeidner characterized the plot in 2016 as a "woman kind of losing her mind after the loss of her son" and her attempts to "find a way back to her marriage and to herself". She said that the book focuses on "how women lose it", and highlighted that "women keep better control of the things they have to do."

Despite the serious subject matter, Zeidner intended the novel to be "entertaining". She stated in a 2012 interview that "tragicomedy is what interests me" and that all her writing attempts

to bring humor to bear on subjects that are usually straight-faced and earnest. I did that with my first novel, which was about a homeless person, and my second, which was about date rape, and have just kept it going, because I truly believe that there's truth in irony, in complexity of tone.

She reported researching medical conditions that might underlie the protagonist's behavioral change, as well as how hotel security operates. The novel has been translated into several languages including Dutch, French, German and Hebrew.

== Reviews and critical analysis ==
Reviewers Joanne Kaufman and Betsy Kline liken the novel to other fiction of the 1990s in which a woman leaves her life and family behind, including Anne Tyler's Ladder of Years (1995), Kathryn Harrison's Exposure (1993) and the short story "Crocodile Tears" by A. S. Byatt (anthologized in 1998). The novelist Karen Karbo, reviewing the novel in The New York Times, writes:

With '"Layover," Zeidner joins the ranks of Doris Lessing, Margaret Atwood and Fay Weldon, all of whom have written in the women-spiraling-into-madness genre. But Claire is something new. Unlike would-be female nut cases from an earlier time, she doesn't set off on her journey needing to shuck her good-wife persona.

She highlights the appropriateness of the name "Newbold", and considers that the novel "really begins to soar" after Claire seduces the teenager, adding:

There are few aspects of a novel more compelling than watching the writer go out on a limb, wondering how dare she. Claire's odyssey of lust, seduction, desire, control ... never veers from what we think of as classic male acting out, which forces us to examine why we would more easily accept such behavior in a bereaved father than in a bereaved mother.

The review focuses on the novel's treatment of grief, which Karbo describes as "wise and shrewd", and highlights the way in which Claire fails to grieve in an acceptable fashion.

Karbo praises the novel's handling of the sexuality of a woman in her forties, and highlights the fact that Claire's journey is not "a simple sexual one". The academics Caroline Field Levander and Matthew Pratt Guterl quote this comment from Karbo, adding that the novel is about "a self in desperate need". They identify Claire as a "modern-day Erica Jong", and highlight the role of the hotel setting, which "facilitates transgressive feminine performance and female sexuality".

In a review for the Chicago Tribune, Kaufman writes: "The considerable strength of "Layover" can be measured in the willingness of readers to give Claire the rights and privileges and emotional rope they'd probably withhold from others." She considers the novel to have "a terrific, unforced edginess and power—it's no accident that author Lisa Zeidner is a poet. And there are moments when she simply rips out your heart and hands it to you." She criticises "some questionable plot points and some stretches of self-indulgence." The Publishers Weekly review praises the novel's unusual approach to the theme of long-term grief, and states that in addition to the "titillating—and sometimes funny" sex scenes it presents a sharply satirical view of society, that deconstructs those men whose work supplies "a false sense of aggrandizement" as well as their female partners. Bonnie Johnston, reviewing the novel for Booklist, praises its fresh and unmelodramatic exploration of the protagonist's angst. A review in Library Journal recommends the novel, describing Claire's course as "oddly appealing, even familiar to any reader caught in the absurd quests demanded by midlife." The New Yorker review states: "Zeidner's writing is like her heroine: taut, intelligent, and seductive."

Betsy Kline, in a review for the Pittsburgh Post-Gazette, writes that Layover "dares to poke holes in the surface of polite grief and allow an intelligent women free rein of a consuming pain, descending to levels of larceny and lust that are both chilling and, at times, exhilarating to behold." Martin Wilson, in a review for The Austin Chronicle, praises the novel's "humor, wisdom, and poignancy" and its "compelling, sometimes hilarious" narrator; he states that a strength of the work is its emphasis on the notion that redemptive endings require effort and might not always be achievable. He criticises the characters as sometimes appearing overly scripted.

In an analysis of why the novel succeeded, Maass writes that

Zeidner dug deep, and as a result Claire Newbold achieves a kind of Everywoman depth and power. Emotional appeal, a rare-but-credible decision to drop out and the conflict inherent in a married woman plunging into a mind-numbing, soul-freeing bout of sex all combine to make a breakout premise. Poetic and honest writing then turn that premise into a breakout novel.

In an online review for Metapsychology Online, Christian Perring points out that

Claire works through her problem by getting laid. Presumably the pun in the title is intentional, and it even occurred to me that there's "lover" in "layover". Given the well-crafted and deliberate writing with many layers of meaning, it's unlikely that there are any accidents in the choice of words, especially the title.

== Awards ==
Layover was selected as one of New York Times' Notable Books of the Year for 1999.

== Film adaptation ==
In April 2016, it was announced that a film of the novel is in production, adapted and directed by Toni Kalem, which is to star Penélope Cruz. Kalem stated in a September 2016 interview that the film setting had been updated from 1999 – in particular, by updating the communications technology used – to avoid transforming it into "a period piece". As of May 2022, the film has not been produced.
