= Cunninghamhead, Perceton and Annick Lodge =

Hamlet in North Ayrshire, Scotland

Coordinates: 55.643°N 4.581°W

Cunninghamhead is a hamlet in North Ayrshire, Scotland. It was the centre of the lands of Cunninghamhead, Perceton and Annick Lodge in Cunninghame. This mainly rural area is noted for its milk and cheese production and the Ayrshire, Cunninghame or Dunlop breed of cattle.

== Bourtreehill Estate ==
The estate was within the demesne of the De Morvilles, Lords of Cunninghame, and passed by marriage to Alan de la Zouche and William de Ferrars (see Lambroughton) who, as supporters of John Baliol forfeited the property to Robert the Bruce. James Francis of Stane obtained most of the property and Roger de Blair of that Ilk, a small portion, for which he had to annually pay twelve silver pennies or a pair of gilt spurs to the King. Listed by Pont/Blaeu as 'Bourtreen' in 1654 and other variations are 'Bourtree' and 'Bow Tree'.

Etymology
A 'Bour Tree' is the Ayrshire name for the Common Elder tree, Sambucus nigra, often found in the older and more biodiverse local woodlands.

The Hunter family papers as published by the Scottish Record Society include 16th - 17th century references to Bourtreehill in connection with a family of Lynns who were the Lords of Lynn in nearby Dalry, the location also of Lynn Glen and Lynn Falls. Another mention of the Lynns in Bourtreehill can be found in a 1608 testament. The record of Lynns of Bourtreehill is as follows: On 7 Nov 1522, Robert Hunter resigned lands of Highlees [Dundonald] to John Lyn of Boutrehill. On 2 May 1528, John Lyn of Bowrtrehill (Sic) witnessed an instrument in Glasgow concerning the Montgomeries. On 21 January 1548, John Lyn of that Ilk and Bowtrehill conveyed the lands of Highlees to Archibald Crawford as guardian for the heir of Hunterston. On 8 Feb 1568, Laurence Lin of Bourtrehill witnessed an instrument executed by John Lin of that Ilk, superior of Highlees. Lawrence Lyn in Bourtriehill was widowed in 1608, a testament being recorded on 17 Oct of that year for his wife, Bessie Wallace. In 1621 William, son of John Cuninghame of Cunninghamhead holds the property and by 1661 it is in the hands of Hugh, later Earl of Eglinton.

In 1685, and 1696 the barony belonged to Sir James Montgomerie of Skelmorlie, from whom it was purchased in 1748 by Peter Montgomerie, merchant in Glasgow whose son, James Montgomerie, sold it to Robert Hamilton of Rozelle, prior to 1748. Robert Hamilton of Rozelle was born 5 January 1698 and was the eldest son of Hugh Hamilton of Clongall, merchant in Ayr. He and his younger brother, John, ancestor of the Hamiltons of Sundrum, were long resident in Jamaica, where they possessed the estate of Pemberton valley, and acquired very considerable wealth. Robert died 4 June 1773, aged 75. He was succeeded by his eldest daughter, Jean, the Countess of Craufurd, who died 6 October 1809. Her sister, Dame Margaret Hamilton Cathcart, widow of Sir John Cathcart of Carelton, who died in 1785 then succeeded. She died in 1817 and the property devolved upon her nephew, Archibald William, Earl of Eglintoun through the marriage of Hugh, twelfth Earl of Eglinton to his cousin Eleonora, youngest daughter of Robert Hamilton.

Alexander Guthrie of Mount in Kilmarnock purchased Bourtreehill in 1847 and it passed to his daughter, Christina in 1852 (Dobie 1876). Christina married the Hon. D. A. F. Browne, who became Lord Oranmore and Browne in the Peerage of Ireland. Nothing now remains of Bourtreehill House, however remains of outbuildings are still visible. In 1776, plate 45 of G. Taylor and A. Skinner's 'Survey and maps of the roads of North Britain or Scotland' shows Bourtreehill and gives the Countess of Crawfurd as proprietor. This was a valuable Barony, lying partly in the Parish of Irvine and partly in Dreghorn.

In the 18th century, the Earl of Crawford, whose house in Kilbirnie burned to the ground, rescued his wife and daughter and took residence in Bourtreehill House. The building was demolished in the 1960s. The woodland policies with many specimen trees and a good quality ground flora are still of significance today (2009).

Views of the old Bourtreehill Estate (2007)

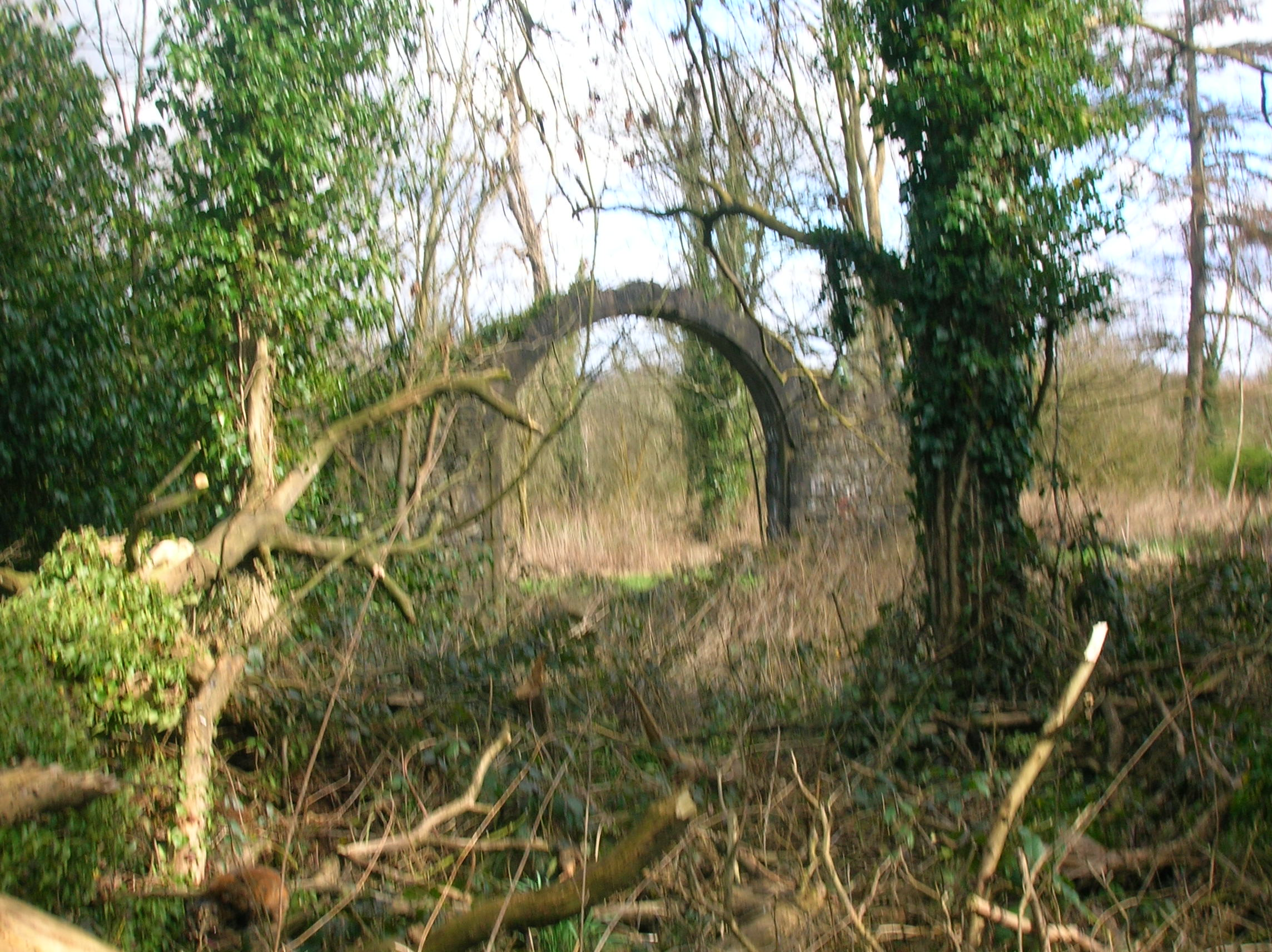
Ruins of estate outbuildings with arch

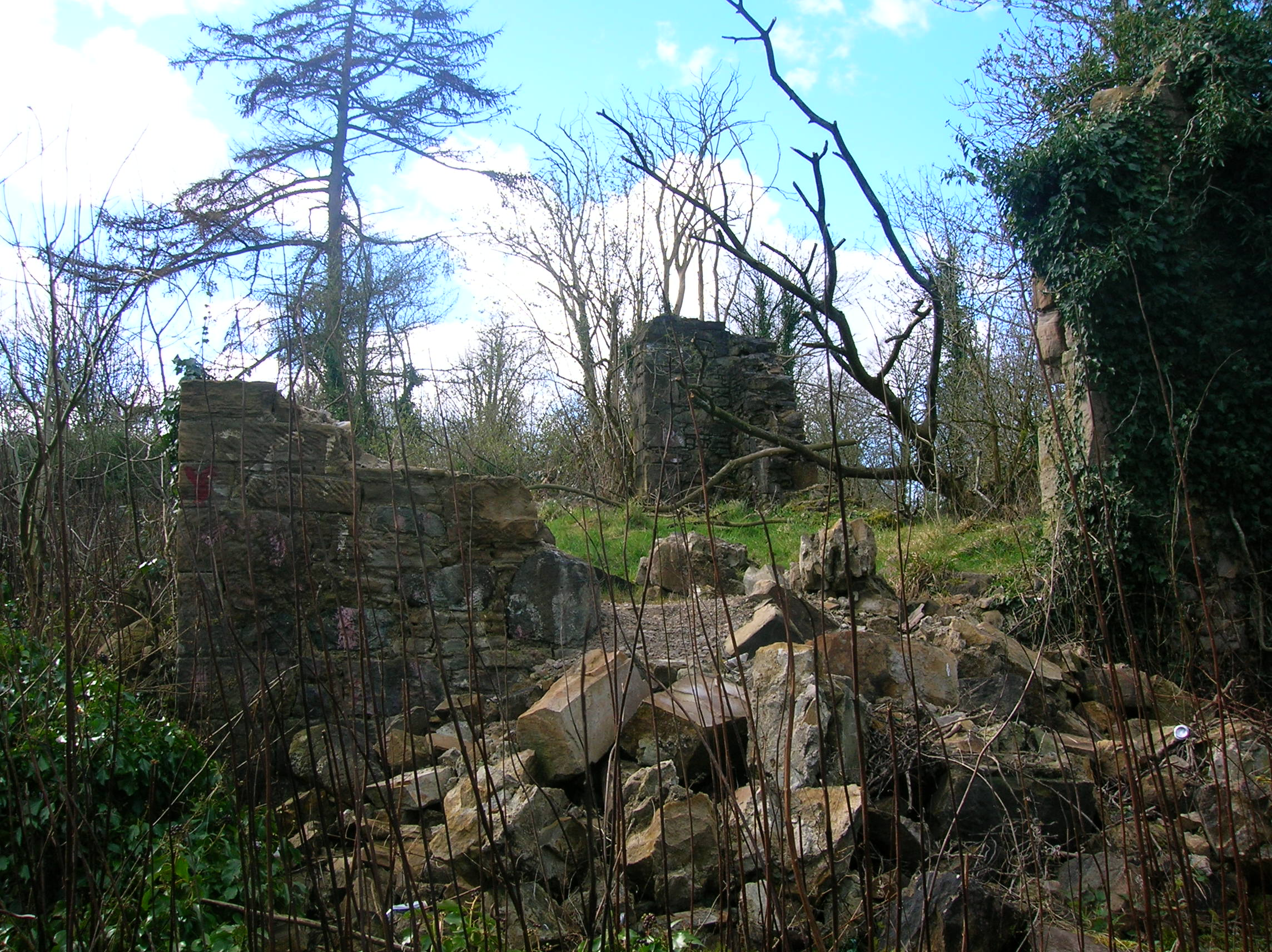
Ruins of estate outbuildings - stables, etc.

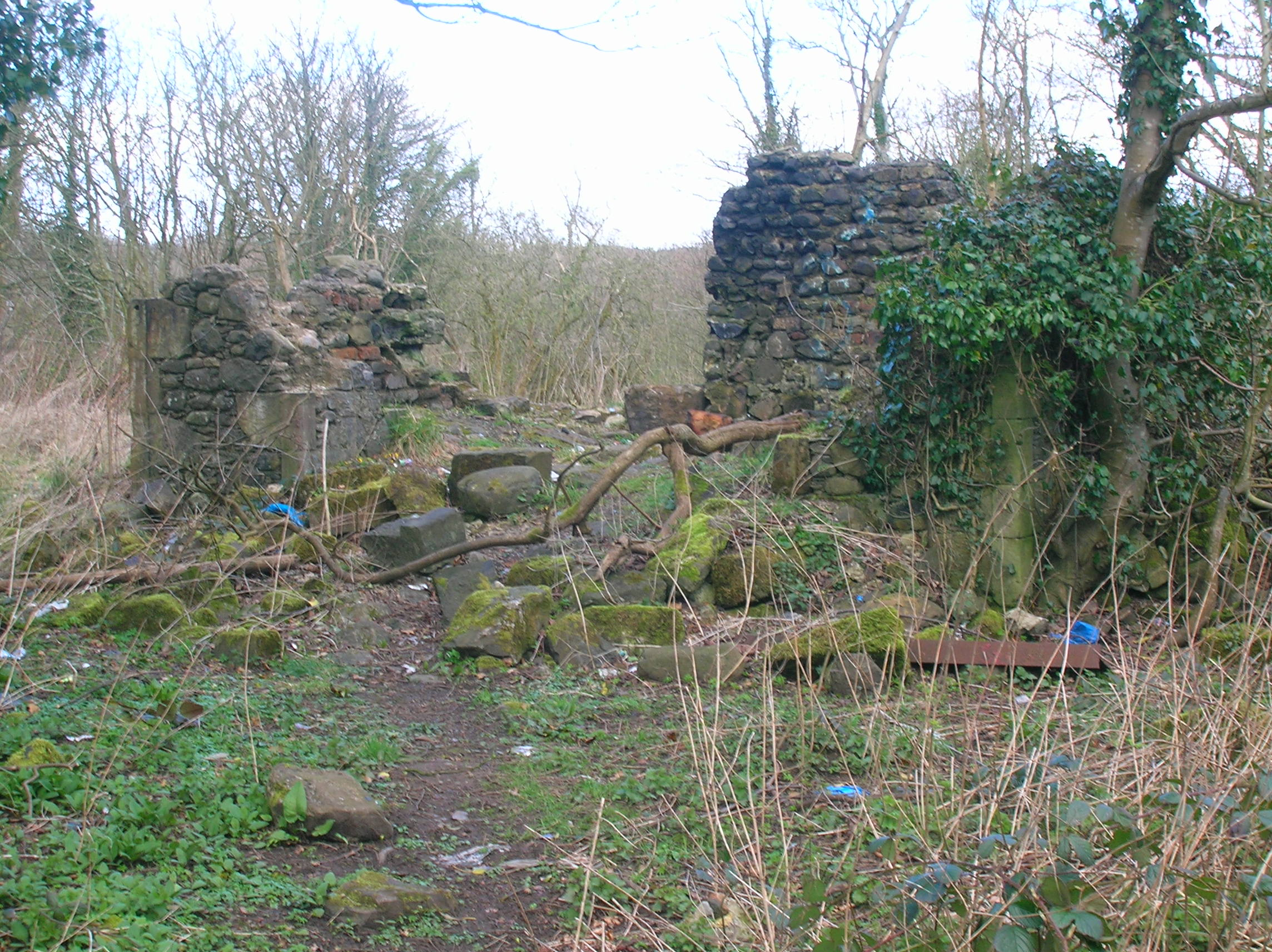
Ruins of estate outbuildings

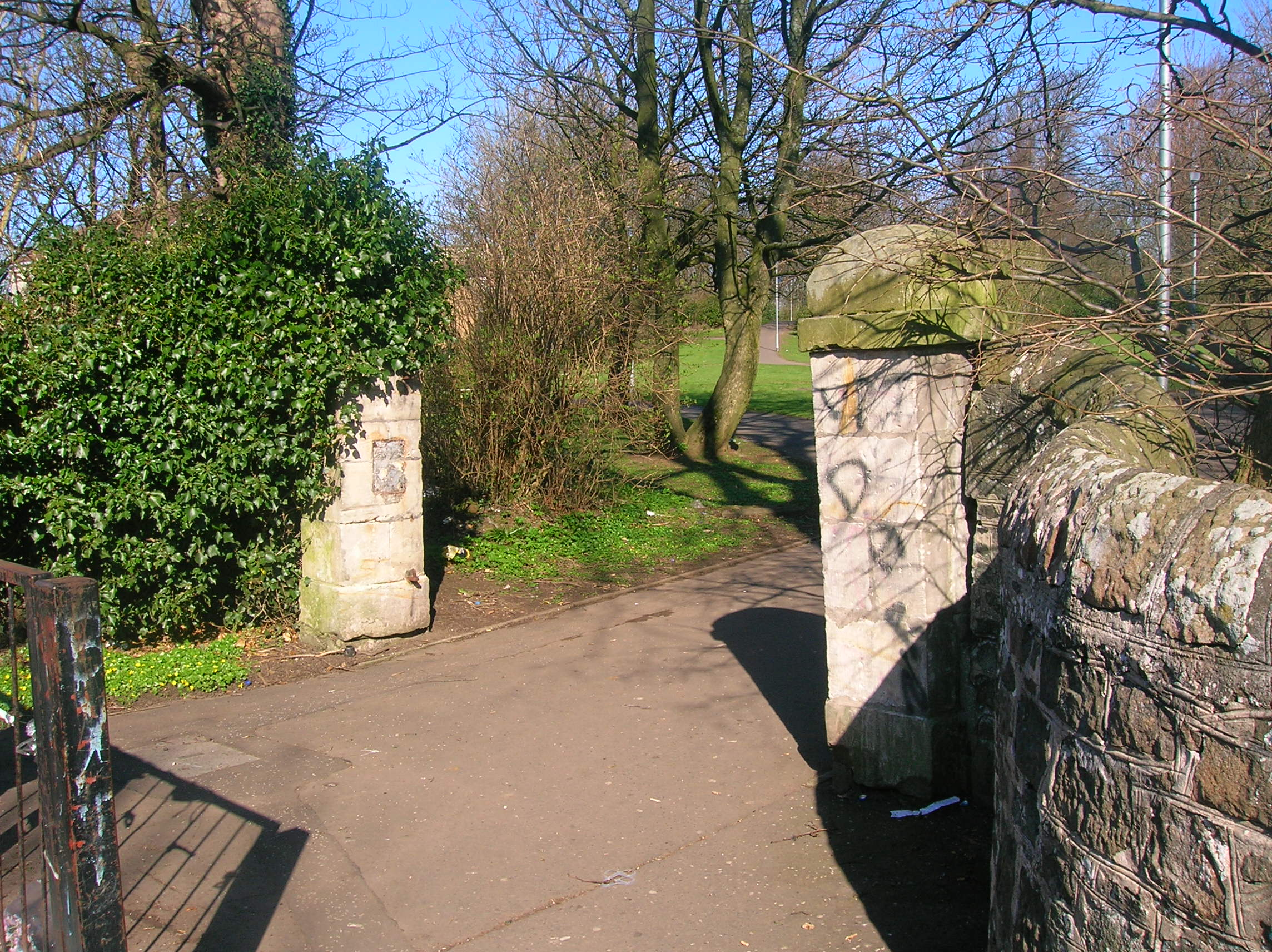
An old main entrance gate to Bourtreehill House

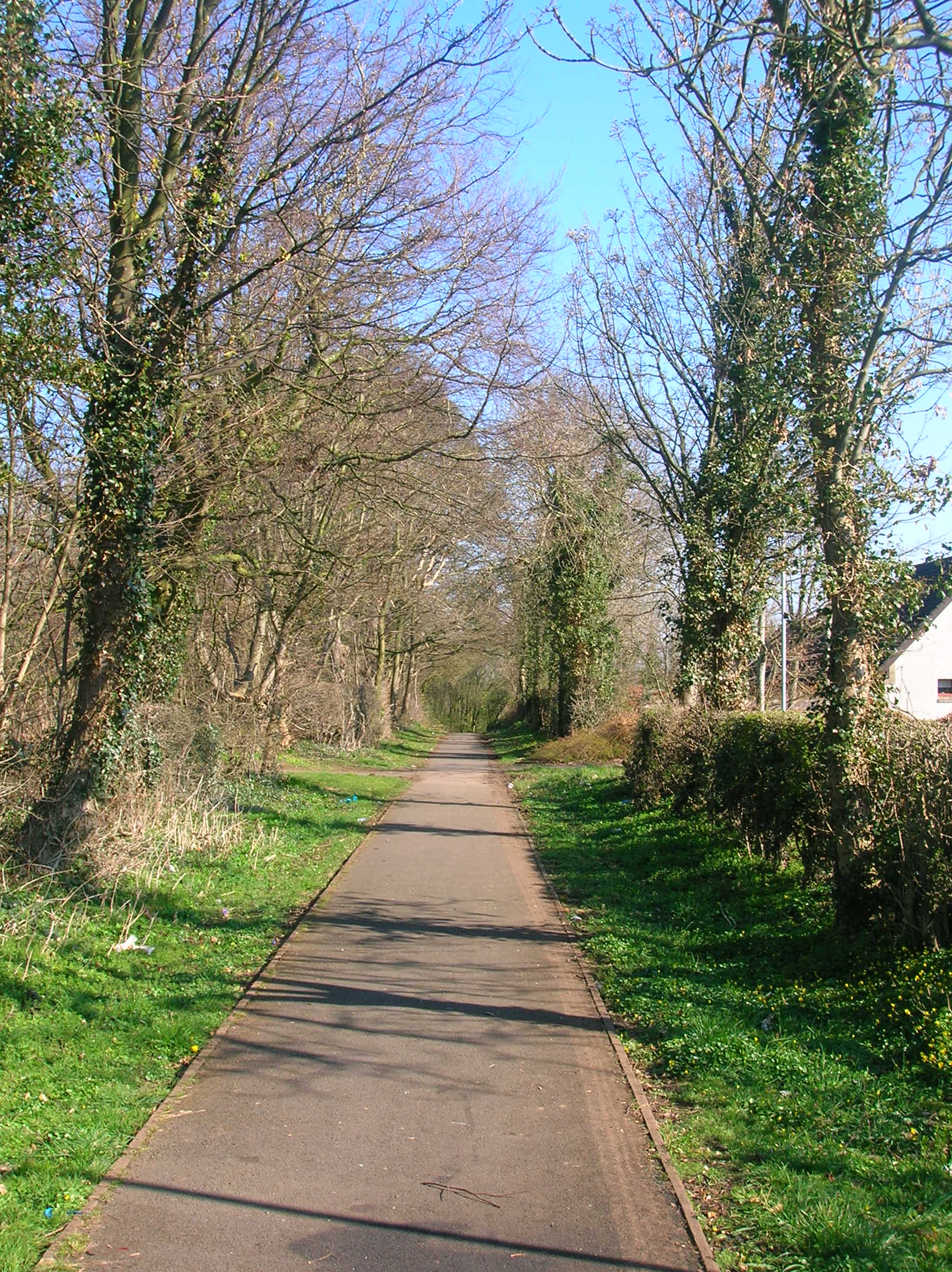
The old farm lane running down to the Annick Water

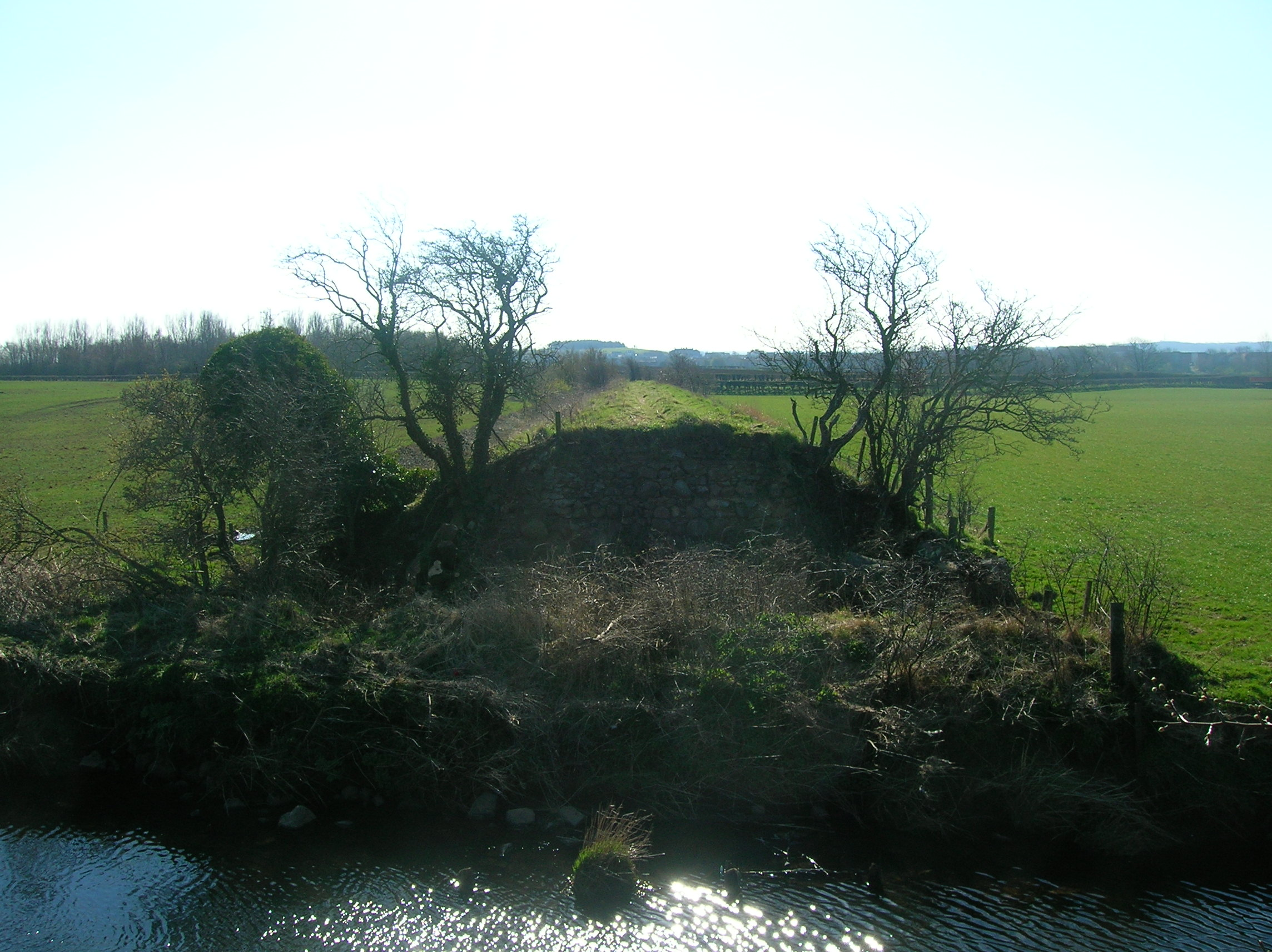
The old railway line to Perceton Colliery

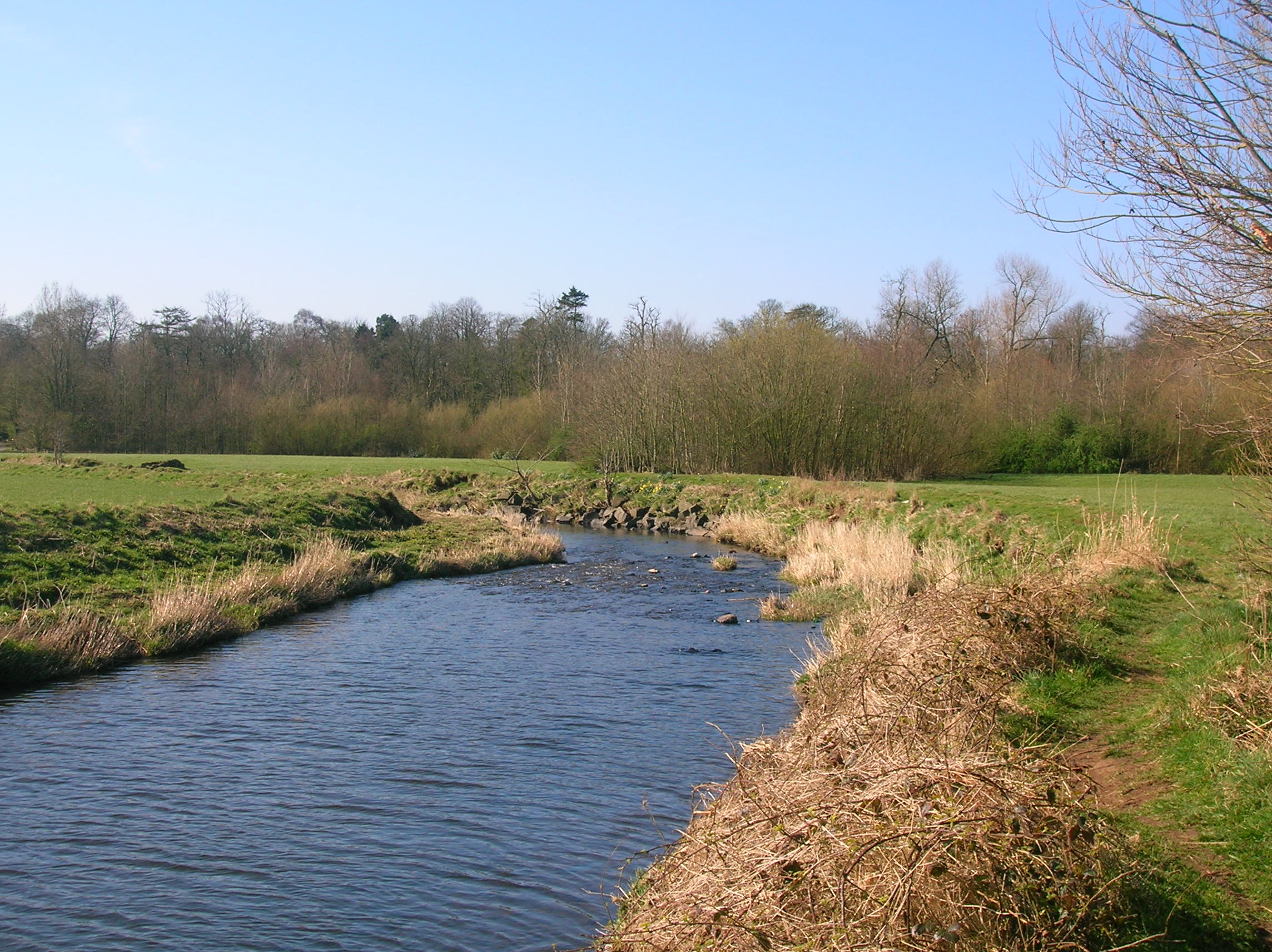
The Annick Water

== Standalane ==
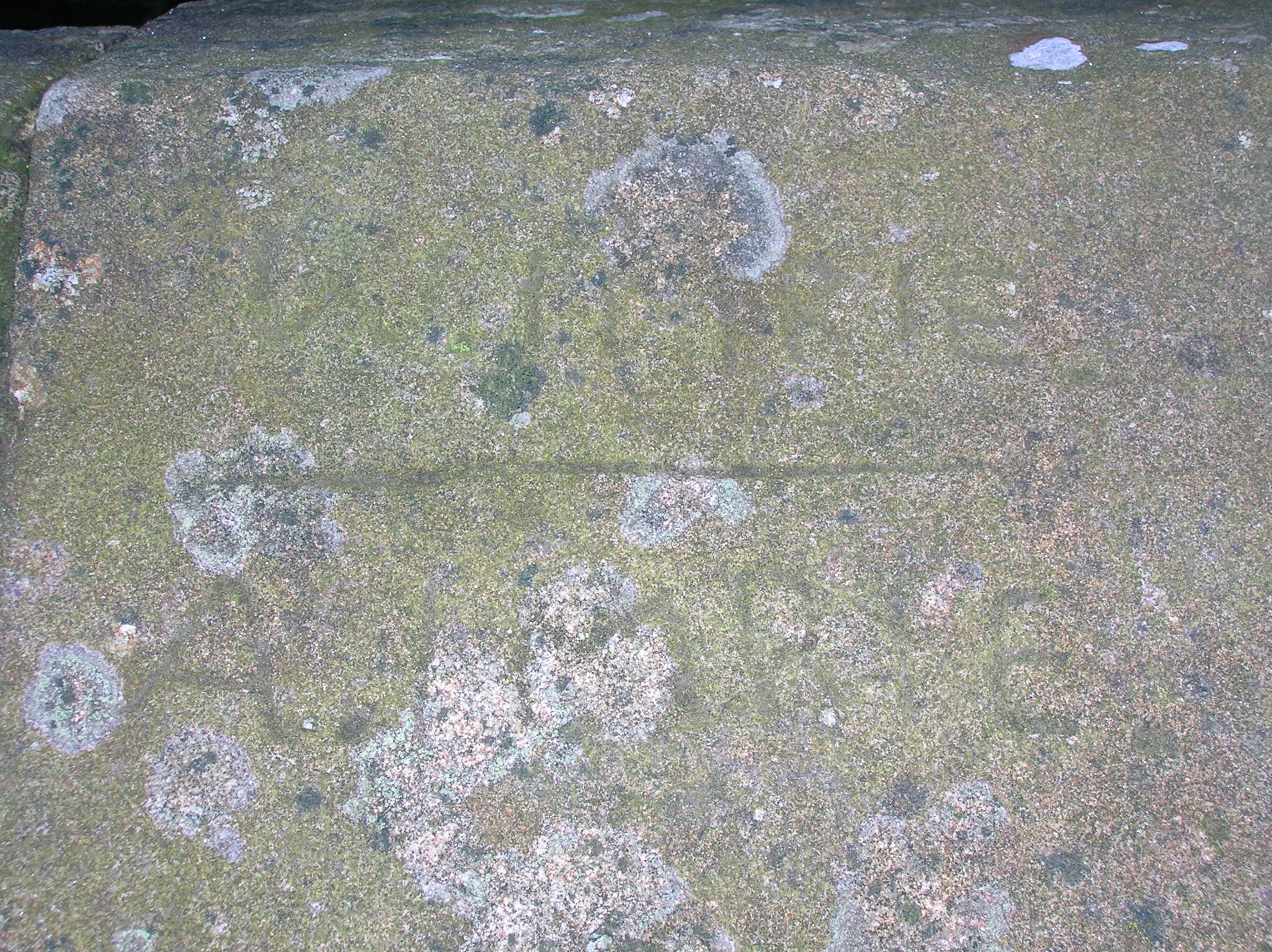
A Carving on the parapet of the road bridge over the old Cunninghamhead railway station

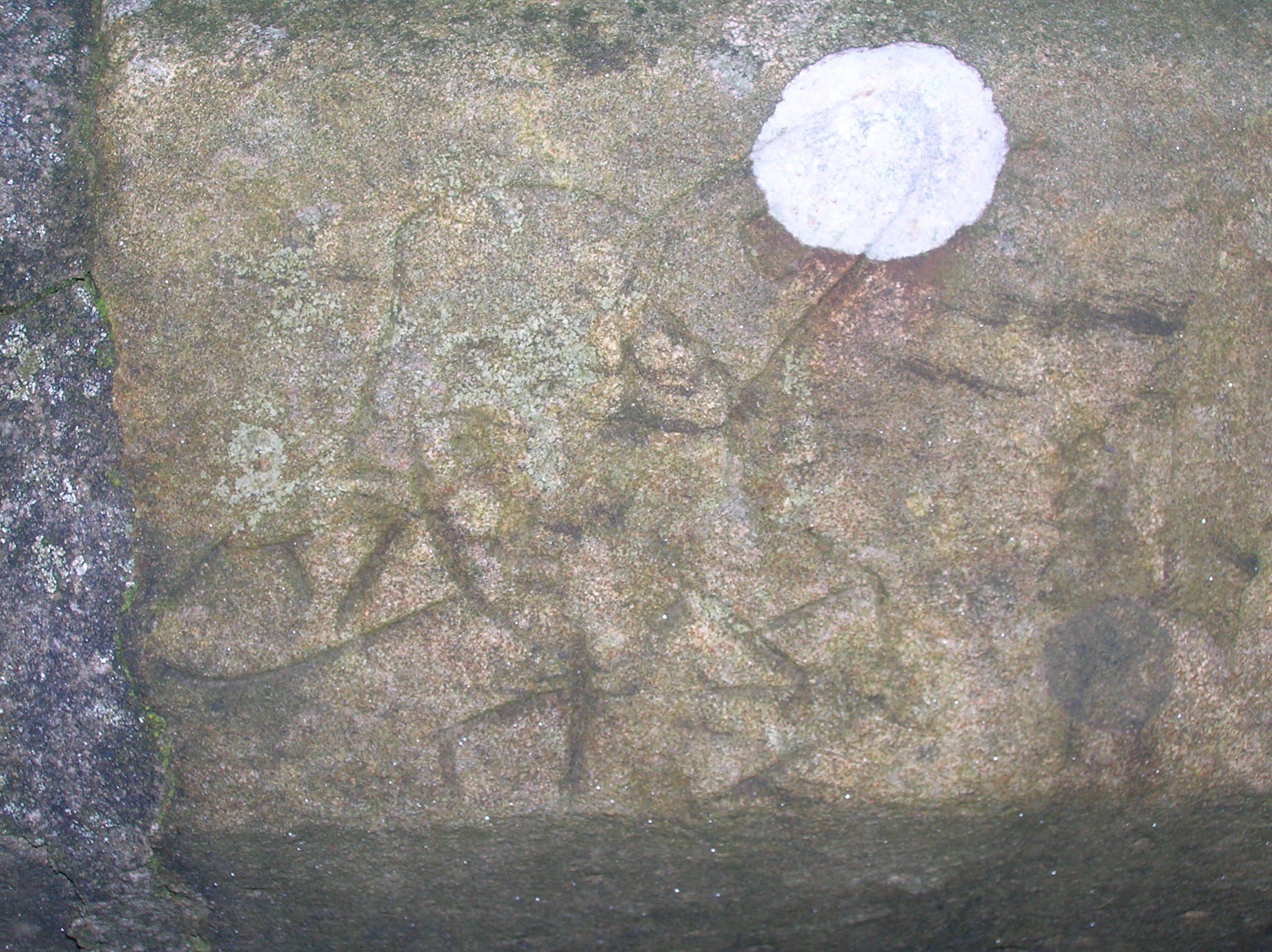
An aeroplane carved onto the parapet of the road bridge over the old Cunninghamhead railway station site. A piece of social history.

Above Cunninghamhead station in 1860 was a cottage, Standalane, lying on the left hand side of the old road to Springside, which is now closed as a new road has been constructed closer to Irvine for traffic safety reasons. Standalane's position in 1897 is shown as being almost on the mineral line; The OS maps after this date do not show it at all. The name 'Standalane' is quite common and was applied to dwellings which lay just outside and thus separated and 'standing alone' from villages or small towns, in this case Crossroads. In 1776, plate 45 of G. Taylor and A. Skinner's 'Survey and maps of the roads of North Britain or Scotland' shows 'Standalone' marked.

The sandstone parapet of the old bridge overlooking the site of Cunninghamhead railway station has many naive graffiti carvings on it, made over the years by local children / pupils from the local village school as they watched the old steam and diesel trains going by on the railway below.

== Warrickhill and Righouse Estates ==
Like Annick Lodge, Righouse was also described as a 'ferme ornee' or 'rustic dwelling'. It was occupied by Colonel Fullarton of Fullarton in 1838.

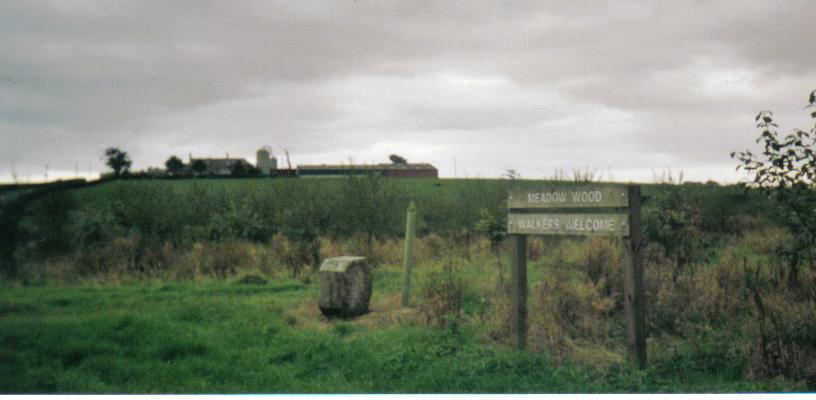
A view of the Meadow Wood and Warwickdale Farm in 2006.

Warrix (now Warrick) Hill also formed part of the demesne of the De Morvilles who forfeited their lands to Robert the Bruce. Sir James, son of Sir James Stewart of Bonkill, son of Alexander the High Steward of Scotland, obtained Peirstoun and Warrixhill, and his son, also Sir James, in turn inherited. This son had only a daughter as heir and she married Sir William Douglas and thus the property passed by marriage to the Barclay's of Pierstoun. Warrixhill became divided into two and the Montgomeries of Bourtreehill held one half while the Cunninghamhead family obtained the other. In 1524 William Cuninghame inherited the lands from his father John and both parts were sold to John Edmeston, Minister of Cardross, whose son John sold them to Jonathan Anderson, a Glasgow Merchant. William Henry Ralston, a cadet of the Ralstons of that Ilk purchased them in 1790 from John, son of Jonathan Edmeston. A nephew, Alexander MacDougal Ralston inherited in 1833. Margaret Fullarton was the wife of Alexander McDougall Ralston. They were buried in Dreghorn parish churchyard. The three sections of Peirstoun were known as Pierstoun-Barclay, Pierstoun-Blair and Pierstoun-Cunninghame. This latter portion is thought to have contained Warrickhill itself. John Muir of Warwick Mains died in 1875. He was a private in the Ayrshire Yeomanry Cavalry and was killed in an accident by his horse. He was buried in Dreghorn Parish Churchyard.

Mr & Mrs Ralston of Warrickhill attended the famous 1839 Eglinton Tournament in what is now Eglinton Country Park and were allotted a seat in the Grand Stand.

== Langlands Farm ==
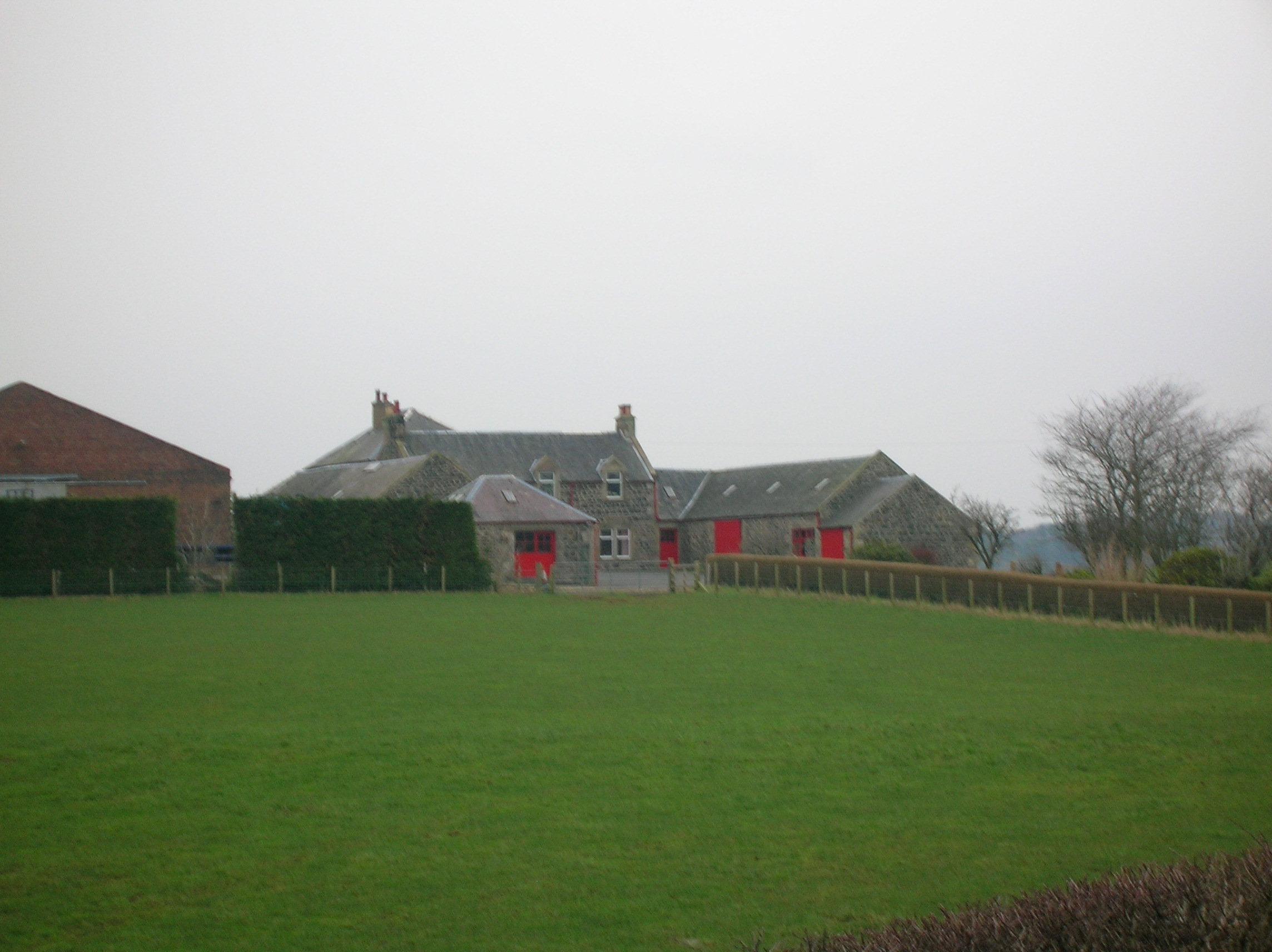
A view of the Langlands Farm. 2007.

This farm is shown on Pont's / Blaeu's 1654 map and it is close to the River Annick (previously Annock or Annack Water) in the area once known as Strathannick. The name may refer to the appearance of the long strips of land which were typical of the 'rig and furrow' ploughing system. Langlands Farm overlooks the confluence of the Annick and the Glazert at Water Meetings; two high-arched bridges provide the road crossing. Langlands was owned at one time by the Sword family who ran the Western SMT Bus Company in the mid-20th century. They had a large collection of Hackney horses with an exercise track and other facilities at Langlands (Smith 2006). A rare example of a pear tree grows near the farm.

== Scroaggy or Fairliecrevoch Mill ==
A mill is marked on Timothy Pont's map of 1604–1608, published in 1654, identified as a waulk mill, used for preparing serge for clothing. The site of the mill is marked on Aitken's 1829 map as Scroaggie Mill, in Robertson (1820) it is called Scrogie Mill and valued at £36 rent. Thomson's 1832 map shows it as being close to and upstream from Ramstane on the Annick Water. It was on the west side near to a pronounced bend in the river.

Etymology
The word Scroag or Scrog in Scots means a gnarled or stunted tree or tree stump. Specifically it can mean a Crab Apple tree or Scrog-Apple as they were known.

William King was born to Thomas King and Barbara Neilson who are recorded on the 1755 baptismal records as living at Sevenacres Mill near Kilwinning. William went on to become the miller at Scroggie Mill and also worked as a farmer. Baptismal records show that his son, also William, was born in 1792 at Scroggie. His son, again a William, was born in 1833 remained at Scroggie until 1851 when he moved to Old Monkland, his place of work. Buried in St Maurs-Glencairn Kirk in Kilmaurs William and Mary King's gravestone reads "...late of Scrogiemill parish of Stewarton d. 3.6.1816 aged 61y. Also his wife Mary Aitken d. 17.11.1841 aged 86y".

Aiton comments that crab-apple-trees were sometimes used in the hedges which were erected since the year 1766. The 'Place of the Crab apples' description fits well with the present appearance of the site which has an old wood next to it with a contiguous woodland recently planted by the farmer at Langlands. Crab apples trees are common among the ruins of the old mill itself.

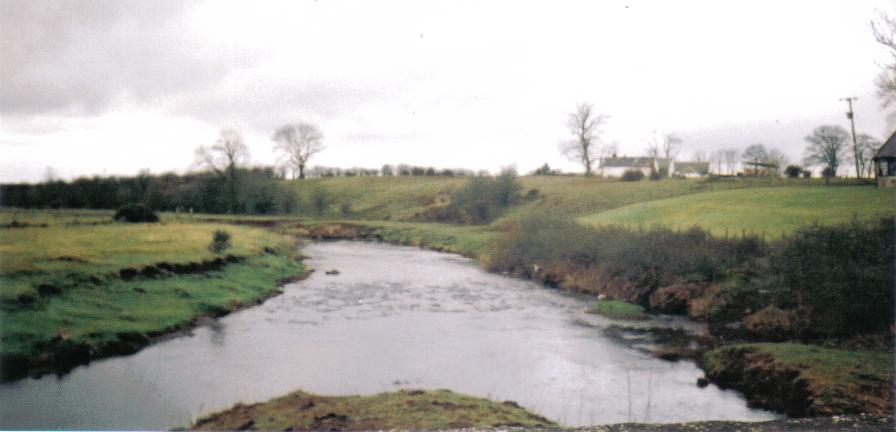
The Glazert Rivulet and the Annick Water at Water Meetings with Rashillhouse Farm on the Horizon

In 1832 Thomson's map shows a ford and a lane running down from Ramstane, which can still be made out and the natural bedrock dyke of the river bed here made this an obvious site for a ford. The 1860 OS shows a lade running across the 'peninsula' of land made by the 'U' bend, with a dam across the river below Langlands farm forming a mill pond. At this date the mill is known only as Fairliecrevoch, being a clothmill with a track running down to it from Barnahill and a footbridge across the river from Ramstane.

Steven states that the representative of the family of Ross now the Earl of Glasgow, has inter alia the title of Lord Boyle of Stewarton, and at this date, January 1842, has now only about 12 acres (49,000 m^{2}) in the parish, formerly called Crivochmill, but now commonly called Scrogmill where was till late, a meal - mill, now converted to a wool - spinning mill.

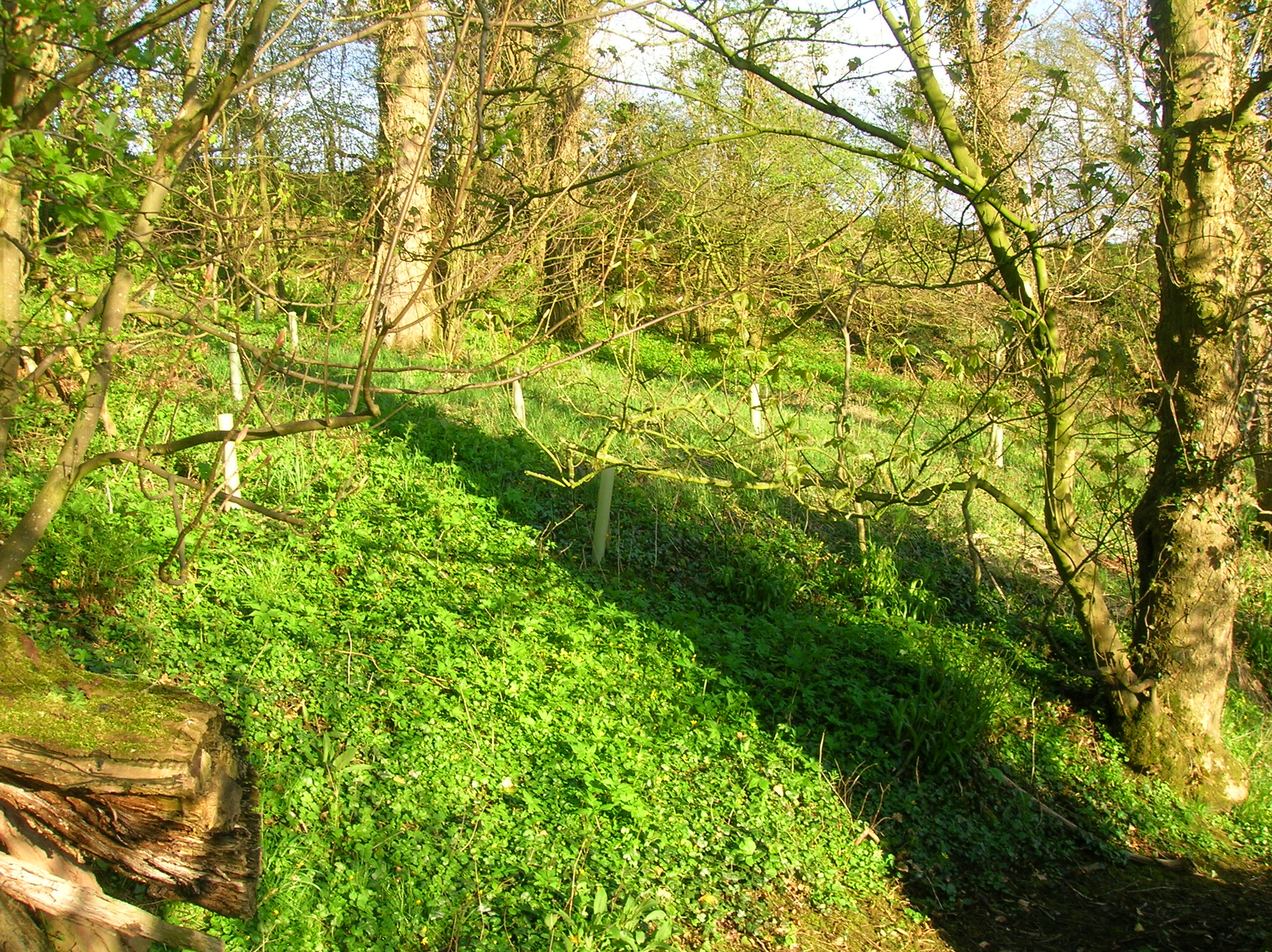
Fairliecrevoch or Scroaggy woods.

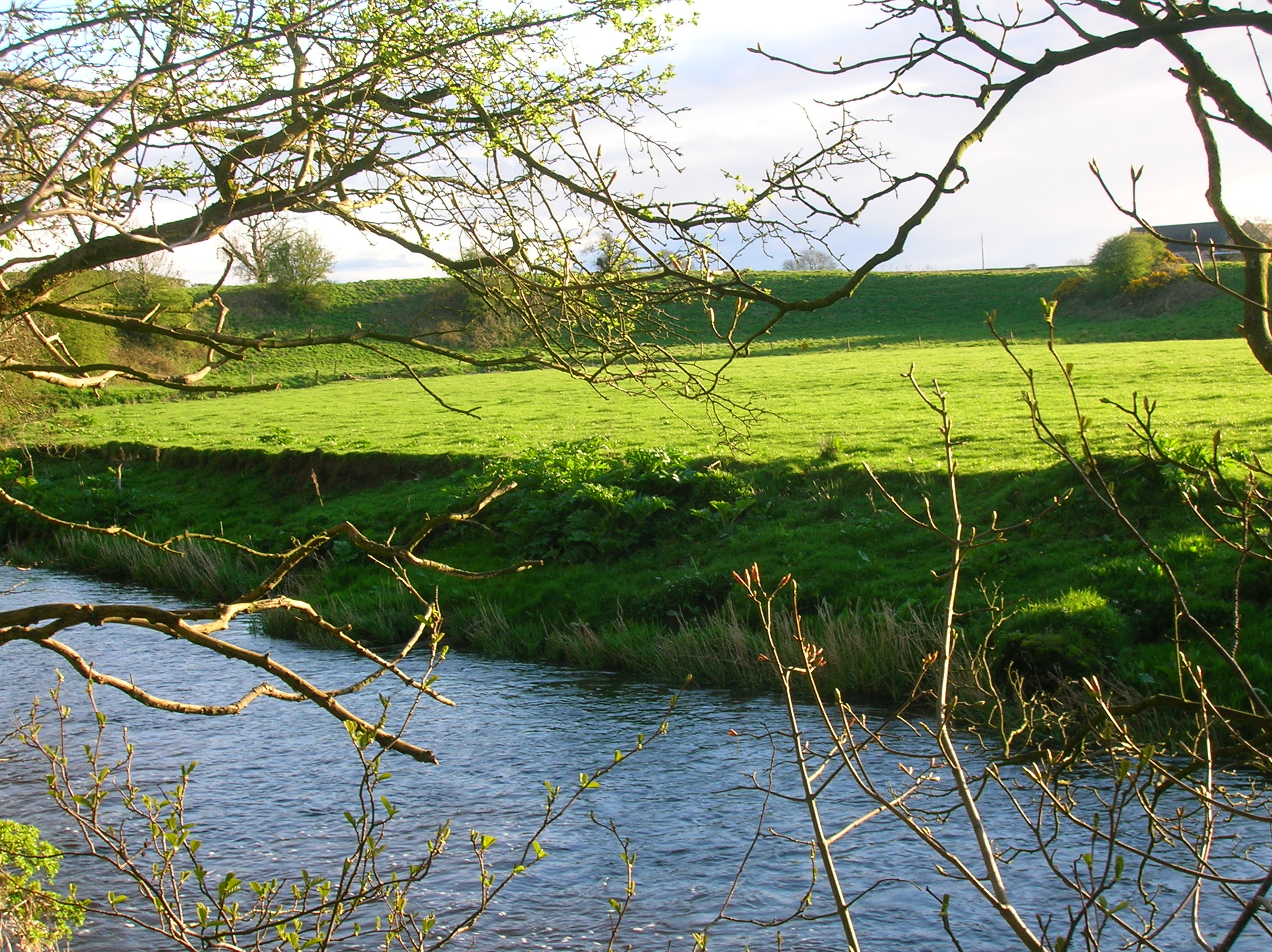
Fairliecrevoch or Scroaggy Holm.

The 1923 OS marks the site and the ford, but does not name it as a mill and the 1963 OS indicates a single building at the end of a rough track which would originally have been the miller's dwelling. Very little remains today (2006) other than the vague line of the lade, the ruins of the miller's house, the foundations of the mill and the lade water outlet area beside the river. The name change may have occurred as the mill at Fairlie-Crevoch by Kennox had been abandoned and could now be used here next to the farm of that name. Scroaggy is a name still used for this area by local farmers (Hastings 2006).

A very substantial metal bridge with concrete abutments crosses the Annick nearby. It is now without its wooden decking and was presumably built by the Sword's when they owned both Barnahill and Langlands farms. The map rather improbably shows the track from this bridge running up to join the mainroad near the point where the lane runs down towards Aultonhead and Aulton Farms. The track can still be seen below the hedge with a gradient that would be too great for most vehicles and a dangerous proximity to the river. The exit to the road was at a dangerous bend and this route must have been abandoned after only a relatively short period of use.

== Ramstane ==
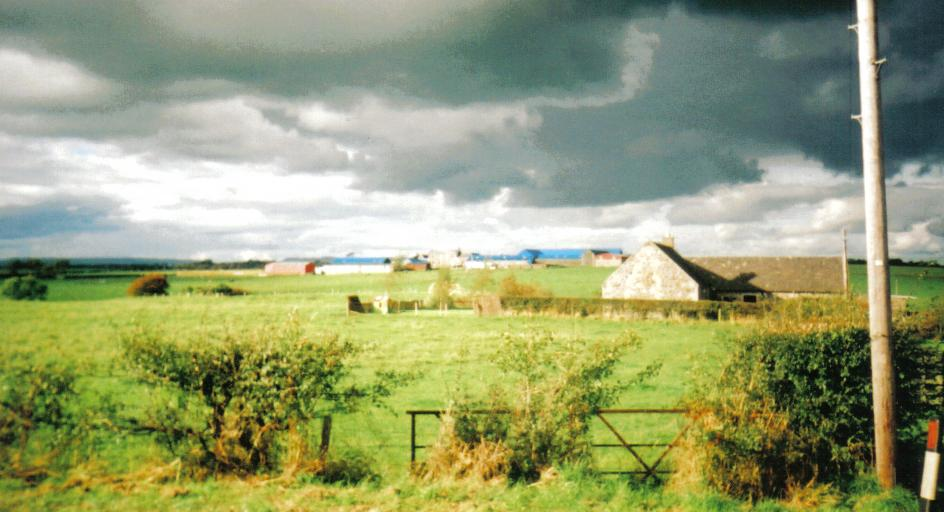
Ramstane with Barnahill Farm in the background.

This 'Butt and Ben' is an old site, first recorded in 1775. The name can probably be translated literally as no obvious alternative seems to exist in old Scot's. Thomson's map records it as Ramston in 1832. A lane, still visible, ran down to the River Annick here, the line it took being still clearly visible. A dyke here formed a suitable site for a ford and stepping stones, which are likewise still discernible. The lane from the ford ran up to Barnahill and to old Scroaggy or Failliecrevoch Mill, while another lane didn't cross over and instead followed the river and came out at what is now Cunninghamhead. A favourite swimming pool, called 'Toad Hole' is found near here (Hastings 2006). The house was destroyed by fire in the 1990s but was rebuilt on the same site. James Speirs and his spouse Mary Caldwell (possibly Galdwell) farmed 'Ramstone' in the early 19th. century. James died aged 80 in 1831 and Mary died Mary aged 87 in 1841. They are buried with some of their descendants in the Kilmaurs-Glencairn church cemetery.

== The Lands of Balgray ==
Sir Hugh de Eglintoun held a charter for Pocertoon in 1361 from John de Moravia (Dobie 1876). In 1361 the Barony of Balgray existed; the lands changed hands many times over the centuries, passing through the hands of the families from Corsehill, Pearston Hall (Annick Lodge), Bourtreehill, Eglintoun, Rowallan, Grange, Auchenharvie, Lainshaw and others. The lands were divided up into South Balgray (now West), East Balgray, Muirhead of Balgray and Knowehead of Balgray. Balgray or East Balgray was originally called Bagra, a Celtic name, on Pont's 17th century map, Bagraw on Ainslie's 1821 map and in 1832 Thomson marks it as Balgary.

East Balgray had been the Sword family farm and it was also used to house the John C. Sword collection of 160 Scottish motorcars as well as horse-drawn carriages and motorbikes. It had been hoped to open 'The Museum of the Sword Collection of Transport' at East Balgray using John C. Sword's collection of sixty vehicles, however the level of estate Death Duties made this impossible to achieve (Neill 2006). An auction had already taken place in 1962 to sell off duplicate or unrepresentative vehicles and eventually the whole collection was sold off and dispersed.

== Barnahill ==
Barnahill's name previously been Barnhill.(1775) and also Barneyhills on Thomson's 1832 map and Barnyhill in 1837, at which time William Pollock Esq. is recorded by Pigot as being in possession. The farm is not shown on Pont's map of 1654. The traditional workhorse of the ploughman, the Clydesdale, are kept here for breeding and showing by the Mitchell family. Robertson (1820) records the rental value at £168, the farm belonging to an R. Montgomery. Alexander Lindsay (died 5 October 1872, aged 77) and his spouse Marion Miller (died 20 November 1881) farmed at Byrahill (as spelt on their tombstone) in the mid-19th century. They were buried at the Laigh Kirk in Stewarton.

== Rashillhouse Farm ==
This farm has had many name and spelling changes with Shakhill from Ainslie's 1821 and Armstrong's 1775 maps, Rashshallhouse from Thomson's 1832 survey and Rashillhouse from 1895 onwards. 'Shak' in old Scots is to shake as in threshing, this being usually done on exposed windy sites to help blow away the chaff from the grain. Given its elevated position above the river, Rashillhouse may well have been such a site. Watermeeting's Cottage is nearby, rebuilt from a ruin in the 1980s. The traditional workhorse of the ploughman, the Clydesdale, are kept here for breeding and showing by the Craig family. Robertson (1820) mentions a Thrasher-house farm near Barnahill at a £82 rental

== The turnpike and milestones ==
Wheeled vehicles were unknown to farmers in Ayrshire until the end of the 17th century and prior to this sledges were used to haul loads as wheeled vehicles were completely useless. Roads at this time were mere tracks and such bridges as there were could only take pedestrians, men on horseback or pack-animals. The first wheeled vehicles to be used in Ayrshire were carts offered gratis to labourers working on Riccarton Bridge in 1726 and even then some refused to use them. In 1763 it was still said that no roads existed between Glasgow and Kilmarnock or Kilmarnock and Ayr and the whole traffic was by twelve pack horses, the first of which had a bell around its neck.

The road running up from Irvine to Cunninghamehead and on to Stewarton was made into a turnpike by the Ayr Roads Act 1767 (7 Geo. 3. c. 106). and the opportunity was taken to move its route to make the road as convenient as possible for travellers. The date of construction is unclear as the 1775 map doesn't show a new route. Toll houses were at intervals and one was on the right as the road joins with the Stewarton to Kilmaurs road opposite the site of the old Lainshaw Mill and the other toll house. Cunninghamhead Toll house was at the corner where the road runs down to the mill.

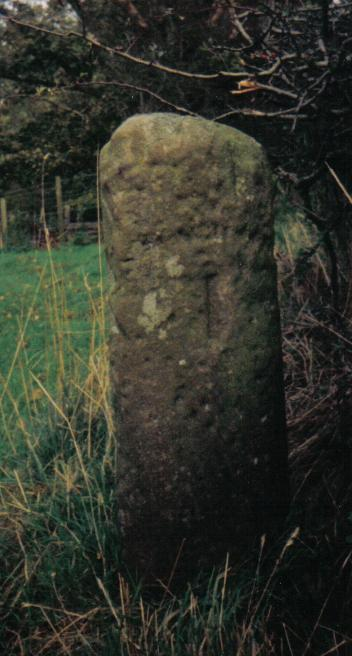
a Milestone near Stewarton in East Ayrshire.

In 1782 Neil Snodgrass of Cunninghamhead petitioned the road meeting at Stewarton for compensation. In adjusting the line of a road, a piece of his improved land had been taken; he had been given in return the land occupied by the old line. His loss amounted to the money he had expended on improving the land given up to the new road. Many of the local dignitaries were present, including The Earl of Loudoun, John Dunlop of Dunlop, Sir Walter Montgomerie of Corsehill, Major Alexander Dunlop of Aiket, etc. His case was carefully researched and he was awarded compensation of £40 5s 9 3/4d. with interest, as well as a further 50 shillings as the Fee and Wages for a herd for his cattle for five months during which his grounds were laid open by the alteration of the road.

Red sandstone milestones were positioned every mile. Only one survives in the hedge opposite the entrance to the upper Law Mount field, indicating Stewarton 1-mile (1.6 km) and Irvine 6 3/4 miles, another was positioned opposite the entrance to Mid Lambroughton farm and as with the others the only remaining clue is a 'kink' in the hedgerow as seen near Langlands Farm. The milestones were buried during the Second World War so as not to provide assistance to invading troops, German spies, etc. This seems to have happened all over Scotland, however Fife was more fortunate than Ayrshire, for the stones were taken into storage and put back in place after the war had finished.

The minutes of the turnpike trust of 27 May 1780 state that the road from Stewarton westwards to Crevoch (Crivoch, two miles (3 km) to the west of Stewarton on the minor road running past Lainshaw towards Crossgates—Crivoch was on the road running south from Kennox), had for more than 13 years been totally neglected, not one penny of statute money or repair of any kind have been expended. In the winter season and during wet weather the road was impassable, even for travelling on horseback, nor could carriages of any kind pass along it.

== Newtonhead, Paddocklaw, Overton, Newtonhead and Southhook Farms ==
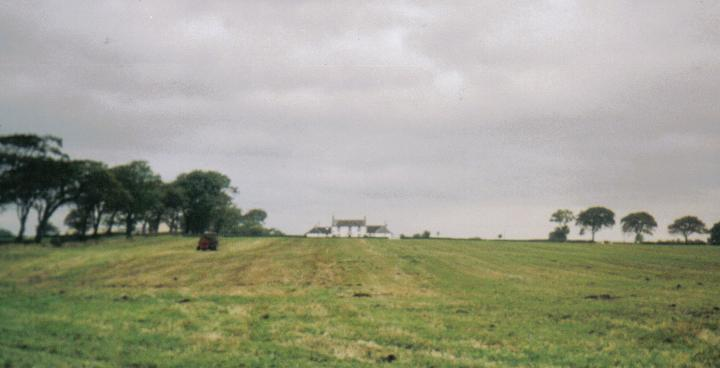
A view of Overtoun from the Capringstone Burn bridge, close to the old Overtoun Miner's Row and School.

Only a Newton farm is marked on the 1775 map and a by 1860 a Newtonend Farm is shown just beside the railway, but it is no longer marked by 1897.

Etymology
The name 'Paddocklaw' was originally 'Puddocklaw', which is Toad Hill or Burial Mound in Scot's.

Not shown on the 1775 Armstrong map, Paddocklaw was shown on a crossroads in 1821 on Ainslie's map. Thomson's 1820 map only shows three roads and not the fourth which ran down to the Thorntoun Estate area. Paddocklaw has an unusual semi-circular road running around it and would have been an ideal site for a wayside inn. The road across to Newtonhead Farm is still present in 1895, however it is only a rough track by 1912 and no longer marked by 1960. The nearby law, next to the railway cutting, is shown on the 1897 OS, but it has now been 'ploughed out'

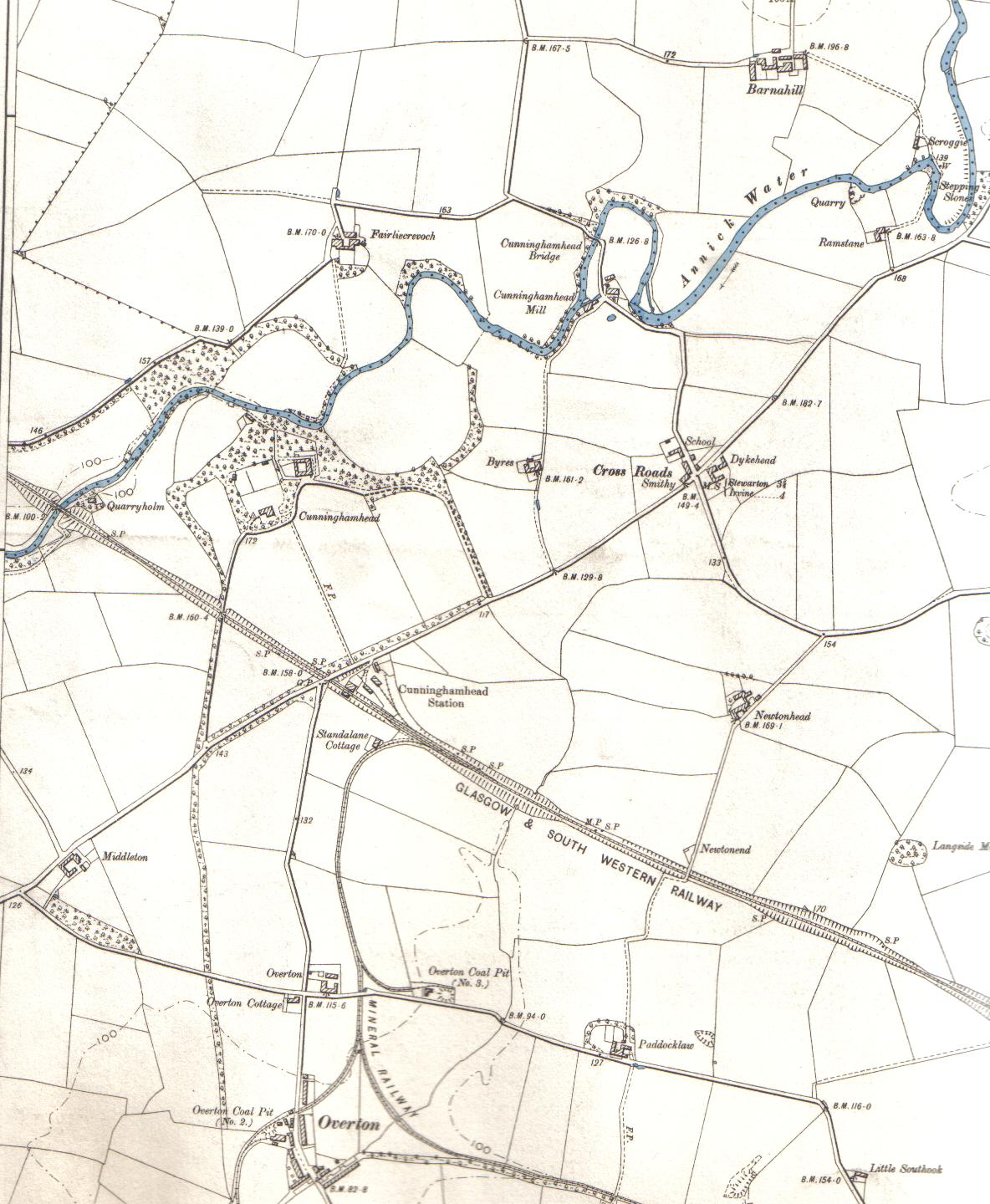
A map of the area in 1897.

The Barony of Kilmaurs was composed of the lands of Buston (now Buiston), Fleuris (now Floors), Lambroughton, whyrrig (now Wheatrig), and Southhook (otherwise Southwick, Southook, Southuck, Southeuk, Seurnhouck, Seurnbenck or Hooks (1775)) and therefore this area was associated with the Lands of Lambroughton. On Thomson's 1820 map an East and a West Southhook are shown, but only on Ainslie's map. A Little Southhook is shown on the 1960 OS. A brickworks with this name used to exist in the area, using local clay and coal.

James Hunter farmed here in the 1840s with his wife Margaret Young. He died in 1844 and was buried in Dreghorn Parish churchyard. Their son died when his ship, taking him from Quebec to Dundee, sank with all hands.

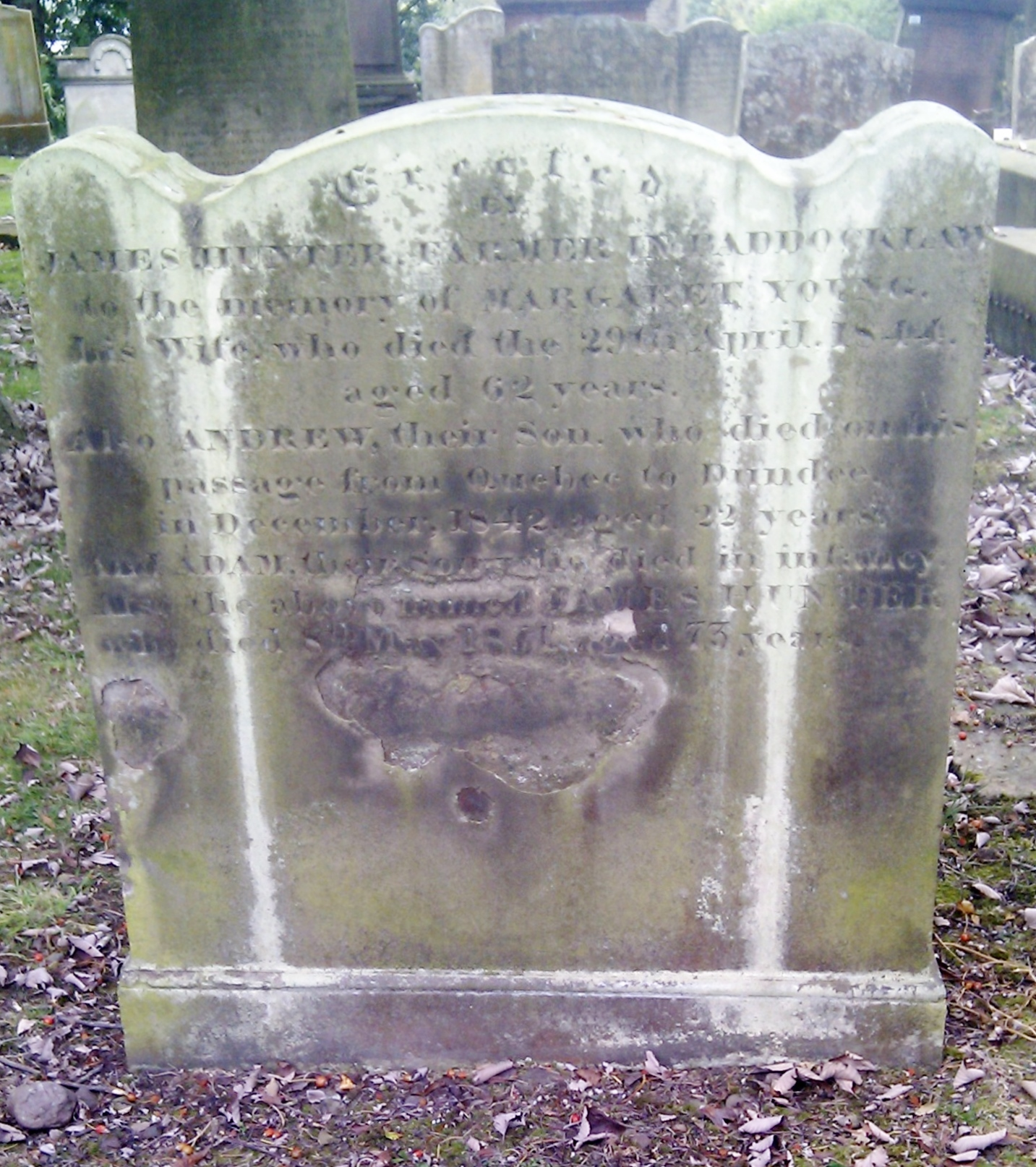
Gravestone of James Hunter and family

== Overton ==
Overton, previously Overtoun or Evertoun (1775) is surprisingly not on the 1821 map, however it is shown on Thomson's map of 1820. The 1895 OS shows the main line railway and a mineral or freight line branching off near Cunninghamhead railway station and running close to Overton with a branch running parallel to the road to Southhook just in front of the shelterbelt plantation. These lines are gone by 1912 and only some low embankments remain today. In 1860 miners rows, coal pit, school and fireclay works were all located near the point where the Capringstone Burn passes under the road at what is now the Meadow Wood Community Woodland site. Overton Row is marked on the 1912 OS, the place was called Overton, by 1936 only one row remained—Warwickdale Row —it was finally demolished in the late 1950s or 60s, only the foundation being visible today (2007). William McKerrell and his aunt Janet are two names that can be linked with the settlement, having been born there. A colliery near Southhook and a brickworks and a coal pit are shown at Springside on the 1912 OS. The road down to Overton seems to have had a small Belvedere of trees in 1832. In the 1880s the village had a population of 413.

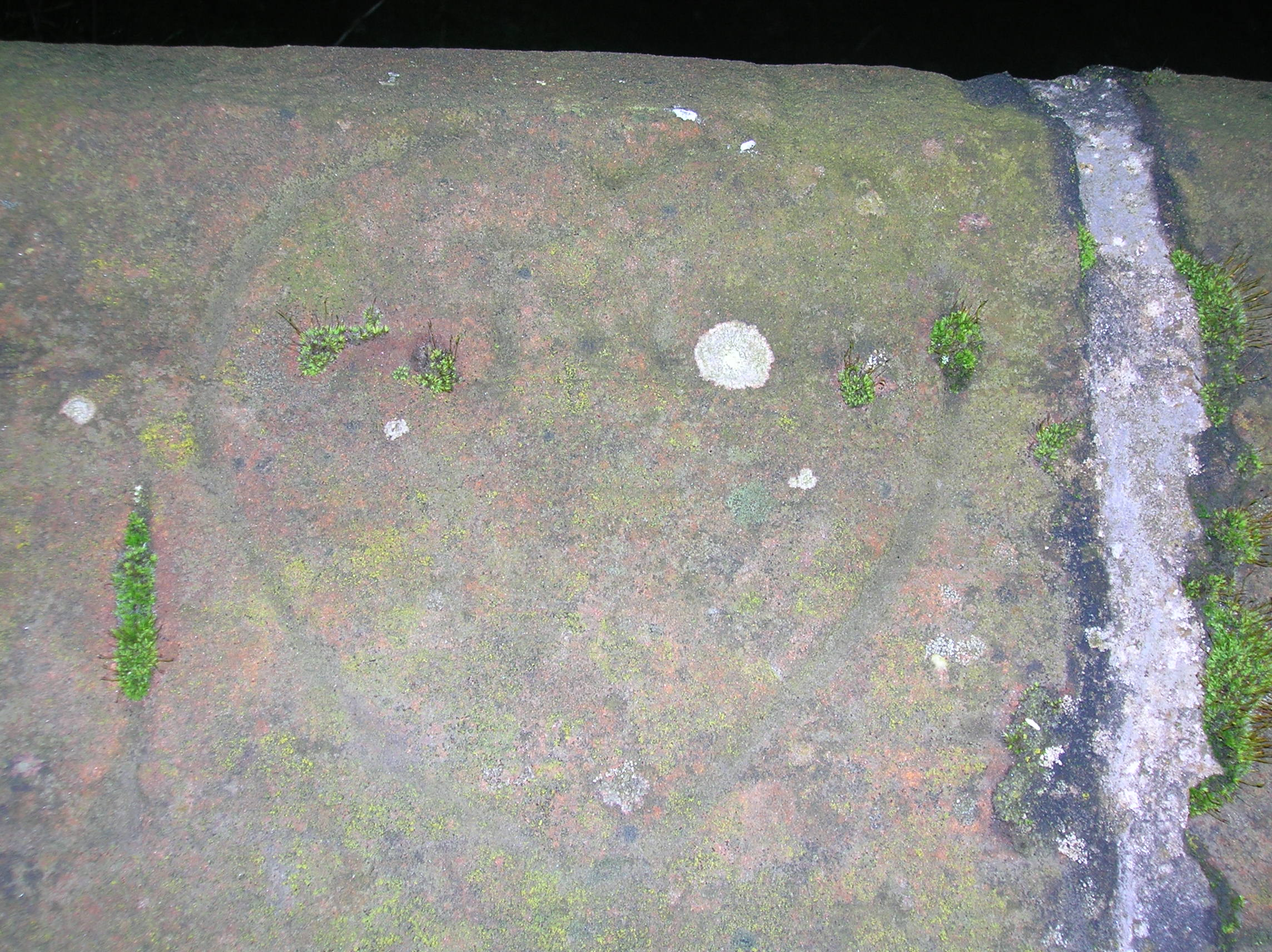
A carving on the Capringstone Burn bridge, close to the old Overtoun Miner's Row and School.

== Barony of Roberton ==
Robertson (1820) mentions this barony, once part of the Barony of Kilmaurs, which ran from Kilmaurs south to the river Irvine. It had no manor house and belonged to the Eglinton family latterly. The following properties were part of the barony: parts of Kilmaurs, Gatehead, Woodhills, Greenhill, Altonhill, Plann, Hayside, Thorntoun, Rash-hill Park, Milton, Windyedge, Fardelhill, Muirfields, Corsehouse and Knockentiber.

== Thorntoun House and estate ==
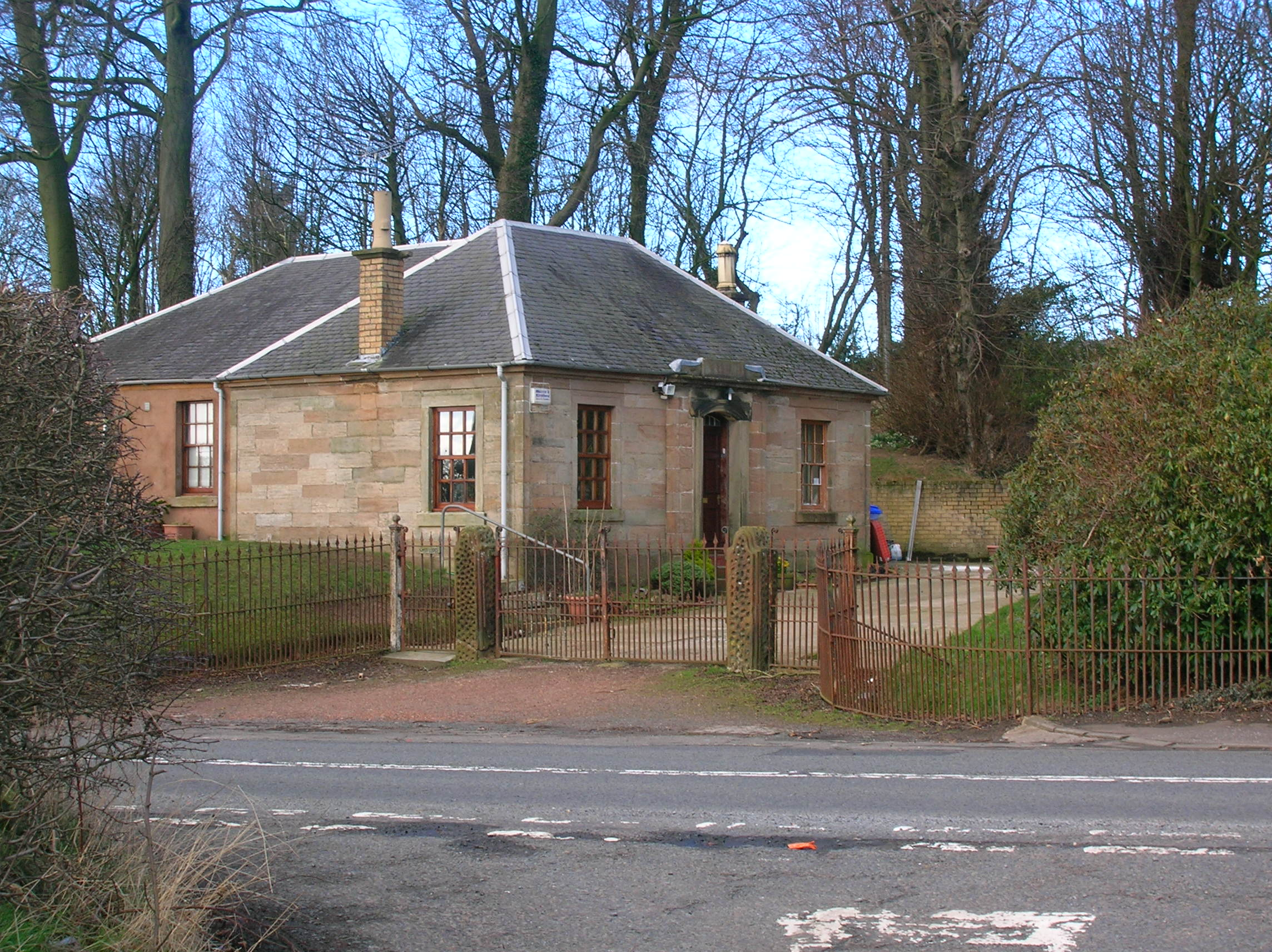
The West Lodge at Thorntoun.

Thorntoun first belonged to a branch of the Montgomeries, descended from Murthhaw, who is mentioned in the Ragman's Roll of 1296. It was part of the Barony of Robertoun. A Johne of Montgomery of Thornetoun is mentioned in a legal document of 1482 (Dobie 1876). At the beginning of the 17th century it became the property of the Mures, a branch of the Mures of Rowallan Castle. Some confusion exists, for either an Archibald or a James Mure, burgess of Glasgow, married Margaret, daughter of Robert Ross of Thorntoun on 27 June 1607. Nothing is known of how and when this Ross family came to possess Thorntoun. Hew Muir was a son and another son, James Muir of Thorntoun, married Janet Naper, who died in 1626. Robert may have been their son, for he is mentioned in a document of 1634. An Archibald Muir of Thorntoun was knighted by William III in 1699 and his daughter, Margaret, married John Cunningham of Caddell, in Ardrossan. A direct descendant, George Edward Bourchier Wrey succeeded through his mother, Sarah Wrey, née Cunningham and owned the property in 1912 (McNaught 1912).

== The Knights Templar ==
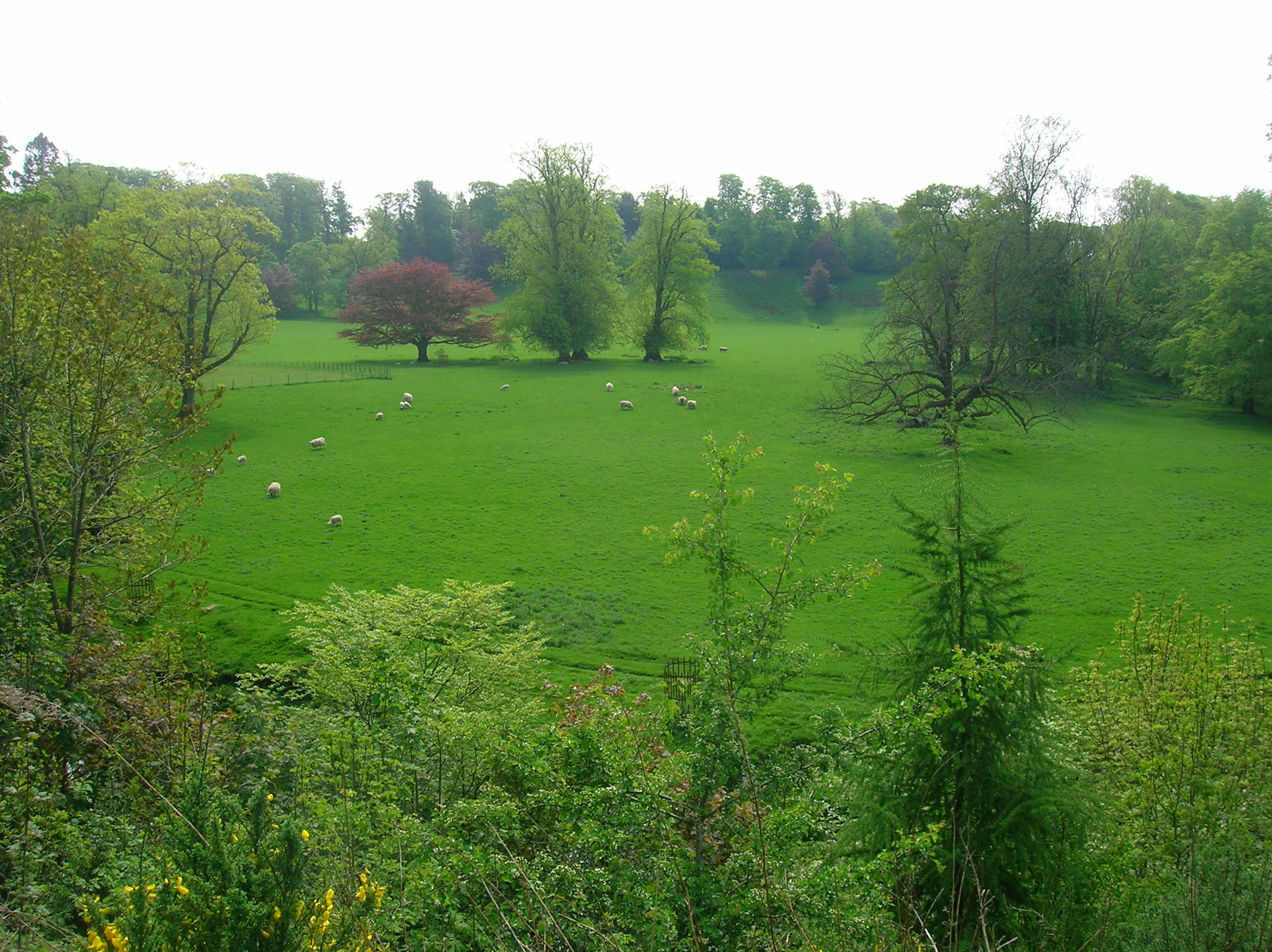
A view of the Annick Holm in 2008 from the Friersmill Holm.

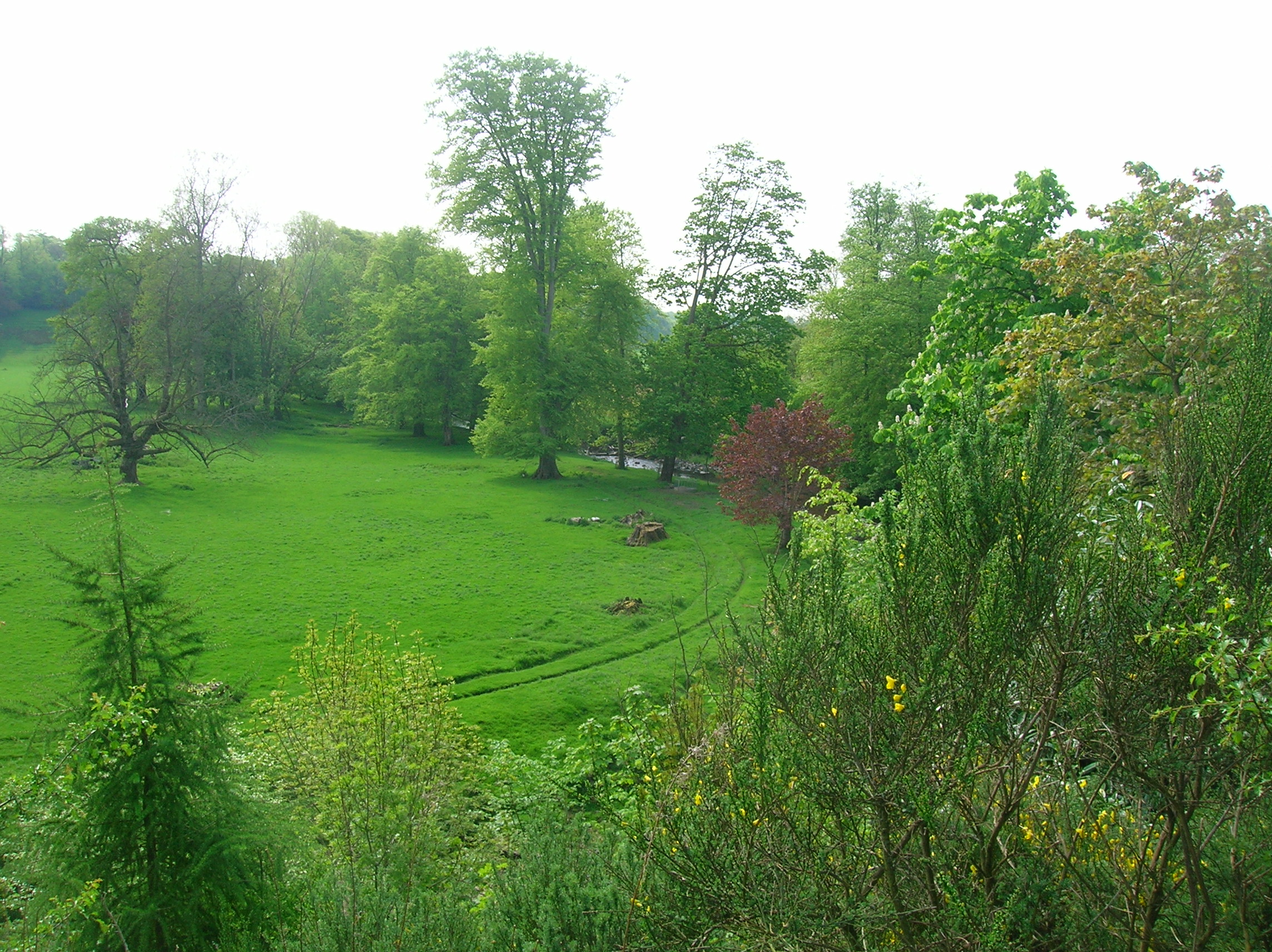
Another view with the Annick Water visible.

Greenwood near Irvine was still known as Templeland Farm and plantation in the 1860s, the name Greenwood being restricted to a small cottage. A secondary school and Teachers' Resource Centre are now present at the site. On the opposite bank of the Annick from Annick Lodge is the Friersmill Holm. The Reid Friers were the Red Friars, better known as the Knights Templar. In 1820 Robertson gives Colonel Hamilton as the proprietor of Temple Lands with a rental value of £6 13s 4d.

The mill in this vicinity would have belonged to the order before their dissolution and the proximity of Templeland makes this doubly likely. In 1312 the Knight's Templar order, whose Scottish headquarters had been at Torphichen, was disbanded (Barber 1996) and its lands given to the Knights of St. John (Dobie 1876). Lord Torphichen as preceptor obtained the temple-land tenements and the lands then passed through the hands of Montgomerie of Hessilhead and Wallace of Cairnhill (now Carnell) in 1720, before passing into unrestricted ownership.

== The Darien Affair ==
The Darien Company was an attempt by the Scots to set up a trading colony in America in the late 1690s, however the opposition from England and elsewhere was so great that the attempt failed with huge losses and great financial implications for the country and for individuals. Half of the whole circulating capital of Scotland was subscribed and mostly lost. In Cunninghame some examples of losses are Major James Cunninghame of Aiket (£200), Sir William Cunninghame of Cunninghamhead (£1,000), Sir Archibald Mure of Thorntoun (£1,000), William Watson of Tour (£150) and James Thomson of Hill in Kilmaurs (£100).

== Micro history ==
The Royal Mail re-organised its postal districts in the 1930s and at that point many hamlets and localities ceased to exist officially, such as Springside, with the loss of Springhill, Warrickhill Row, Bankhead and Little Kirkland .

The term "rebus" refers to the use of a pictogram to represent a syllabic sound. One example is that of a seal with a barrel (or tun) engraved on it, the barrel transfixed with an arrow. This becomes 'A Tun Pierced' or Piercetun, Piercetoun, Pearston or Perceton. The origins of the name Perceton is unclear and the use of rebuses was so popular at one time that the name may have some obscure link with this fashion for pictorial puns (Roberts 2006).

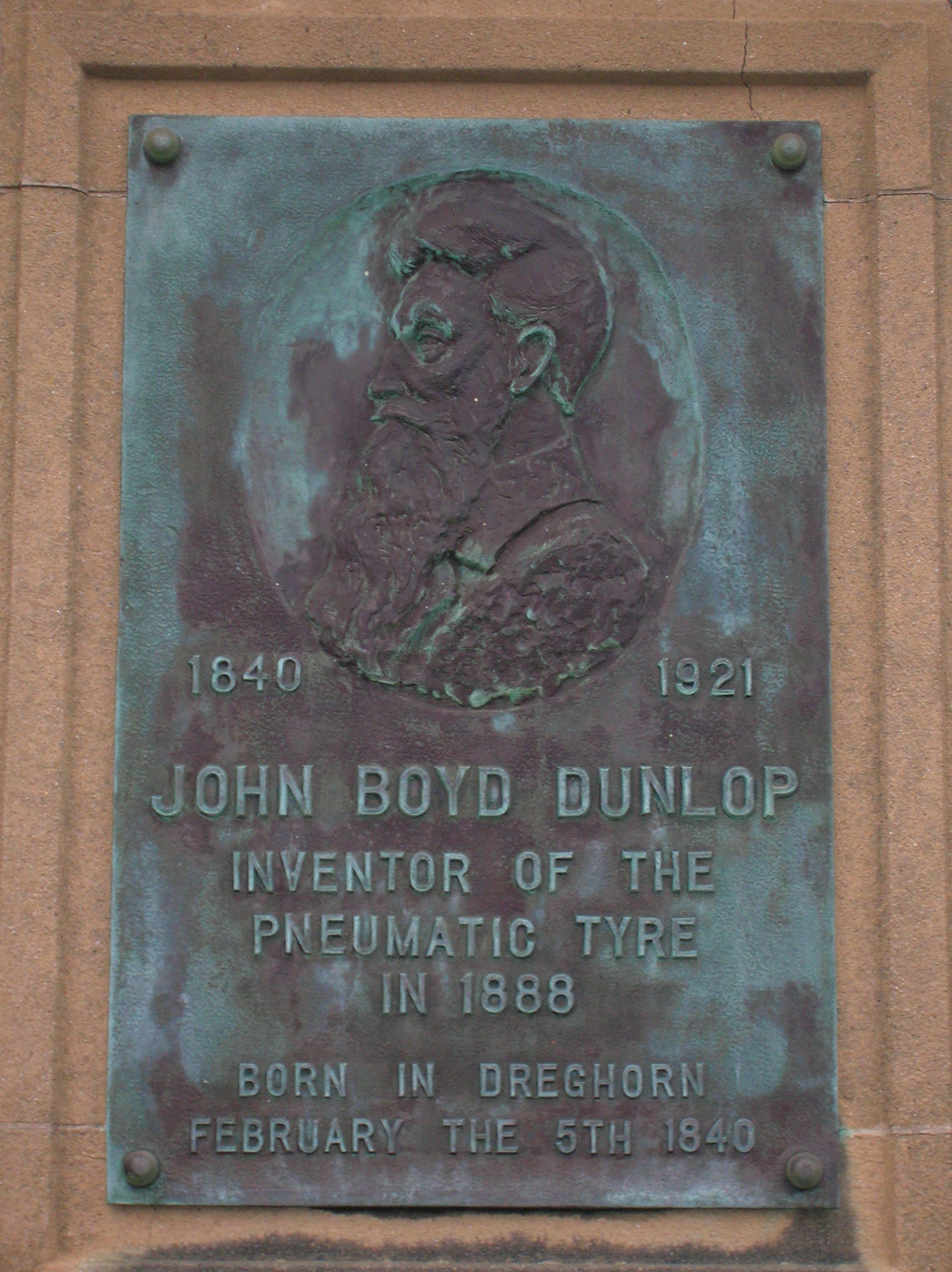
A memorial plaque to John Boyd Dunlop at Dreghorn.

John Boyd Dunlop, the inventor of the pneumatic tyre was born in a farm at Dreghorn.

To prevent the Covenanters holding 'Conventicles', King Charles II moved highland troops, the 'Highland Host' into the westland of Ayrshire. "They took free quarters; they robbed people on the high road; they knocked down and wounded those who complained; they stole, and wantonly destroyed, cattle; they subjected people to the torture of fire to discover to them where their money was hidden; they threatened to burn down houses if their demands were not at once complied with; besides free quarters they demanded money every day; they compelled even poor families to buy brandy and tobacco for them; they cut and wounded people from sheer devilment." The cost of all this amounted to £1,505 17s 0d in Dreghorn & Pearceton (sic) parish alone.

Lawthorn Wood is a Scottish Wildlife Trust Nature reserve and from the old maps it seems to have been part of a swathe of woodland which ran on either side of the road to Glasgow in the heyday of the Eglinton Estate.

In 1820 Dreghorn Parish had only five people qualified to vote, these being the proprietors of Cunninghamhead, Annock Lodge, Langlands (2) and Warwickhill!

On one of the hills at Hessilhead, previously Hazlehead (1820), there was a druidical rocking stone which due to people digging beneath it, has ceased to rock! (Robertson 1820).

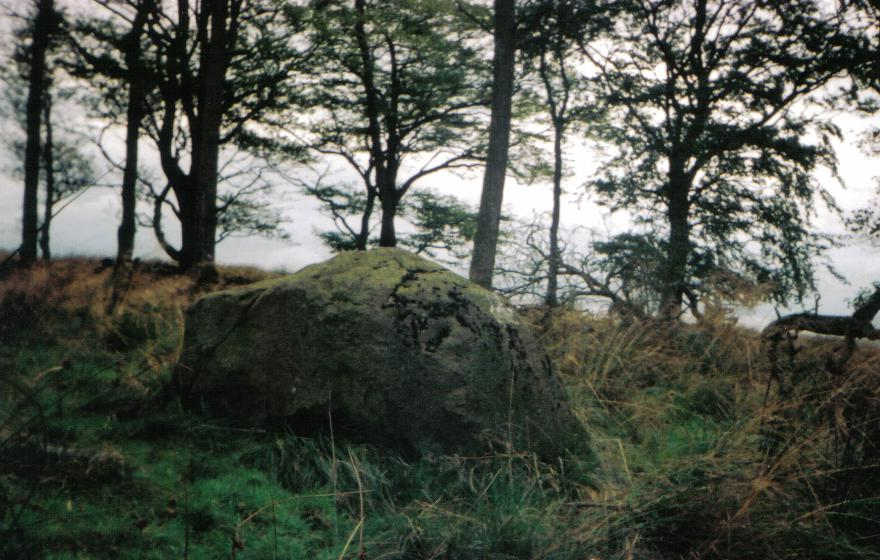
The Rocking Stone on Cuff Hill near Hessilhead.

Aiton in 1811 mentions "a curious notion that has long prevailed in the County of Ayr, and elsewhere, that the wool of sheep was pernicious to the growth of thorns".

A large and well-preserved prehistoric cairn is present at Lawthorn (Smith 1895). Its name is suggestive of a court hill or burial mound. It is 21 paces in diameter at the base, 14 feet (4.3 m) in diameter at the top and 9 feet 8 inches (2.95 m) high. It is largely composed of boulders and a large one made of graywacke, 7 feet (2.1 m) long, is partly buried on the top edge facing south (Smith 1895).

A dwelling with the unusual name of Little Sea is indicated as lying between Ruddinghill (now Roddinghill) Farm and Fairleycrivoch (now Fairliecrevoch) Farm on the Thomson 1832 map. It is not shown on the 1860 or subsequent OS maps.

A dwelling named Dambuck or Damback lay close to the railway embankment near West Balgray (just Balgary in 1832), it is last named on the 1860 map, but the site is still shown on the 1921 OS. Limekilns are a feature of some farms in the area, indicated in 1860 at Fairliecrevoch and Barnahill.

Frederick the Great of Prussia visited Irvine and made a trip to Perceton before returning to Potsdam.

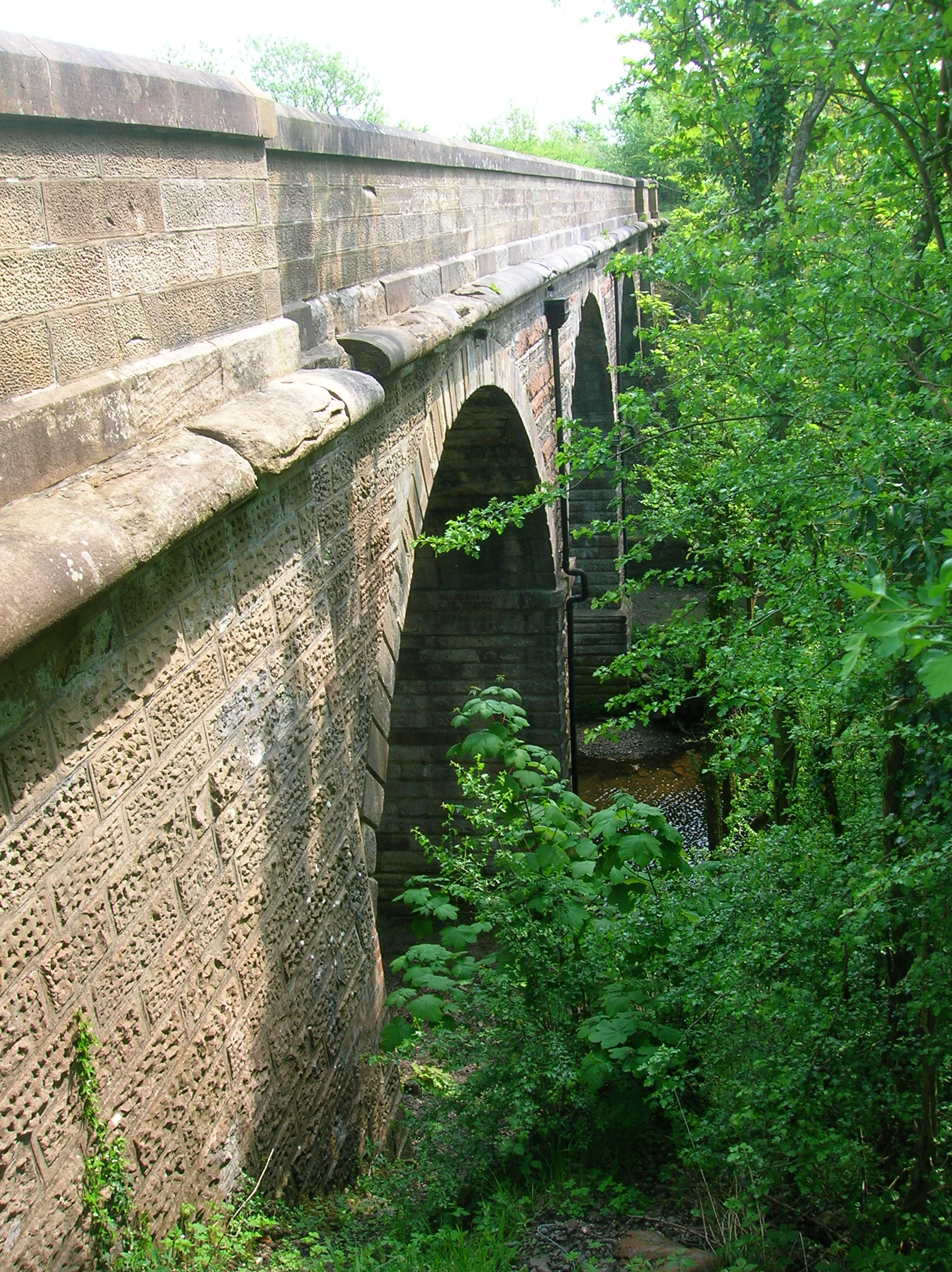
Detail of the disused, but restored, Annick Viaduct.

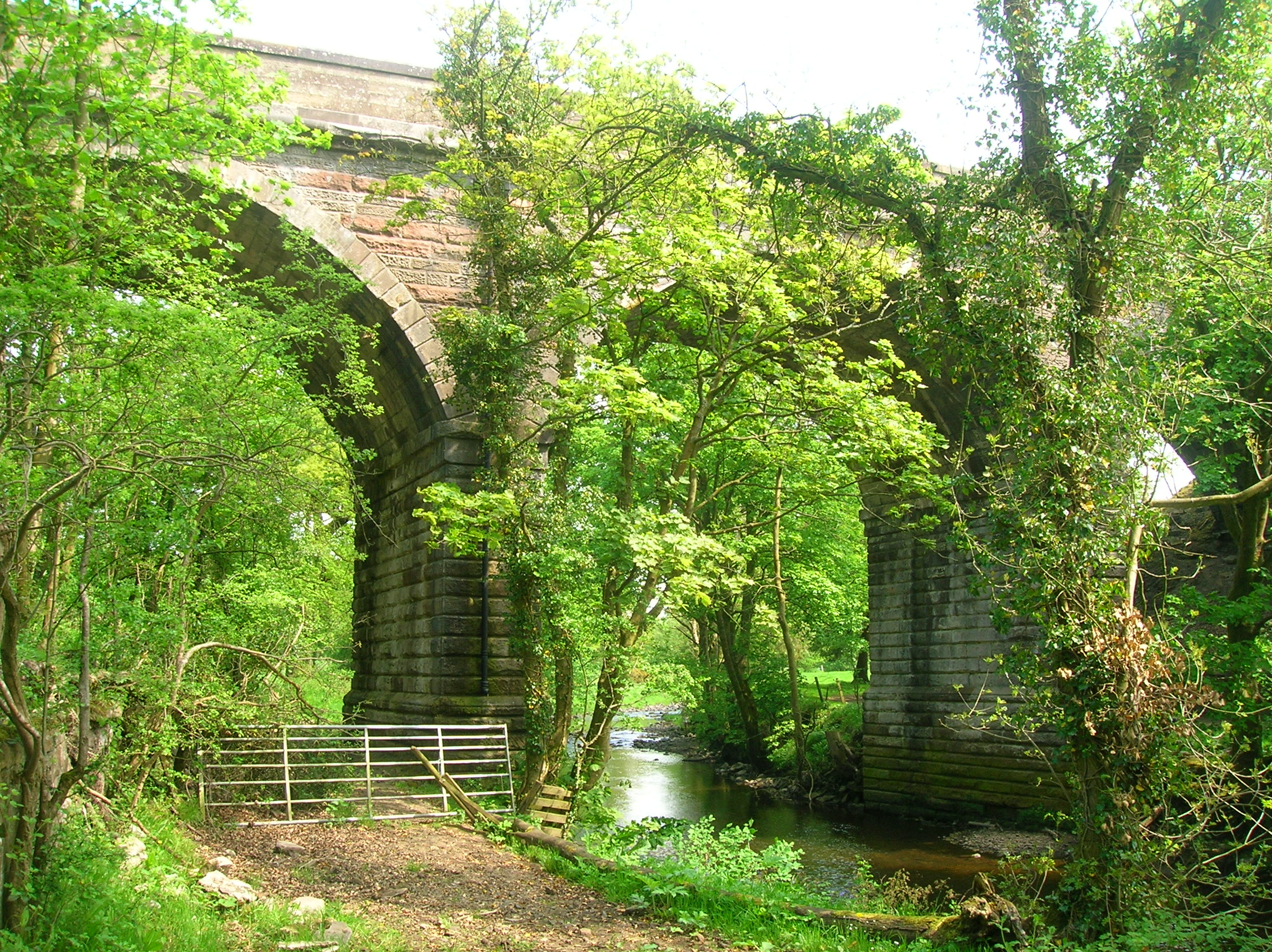
A view from the banks of the Annick Water.

Limekilns seem to have come into regular use about the 18th century. Large limestone blocks were used for building but the smaller pieces were burnt, using coal dug in the parish (Topog Dict Scot) to produce lime which was a useful commodity in various ways: it could be spread on the fields to reduce acidity, for lime-mortar in buildings or for lime-washing on farm buildings. It was regarded as cleansing agent.

John Hasting's of West Lambroughton in 1995 recalled when the road was tarmaced as this made walking to the school awkward in hot weather as the tar melted and stuck to the soles of his feet. In those days, the first decade of the 20th century, children in particular still did not wear shoes, except for church on Sundays.

The Wallace family were blacksmiths for several generations, living and working at Crossroads in the 19th century. They are buried at the Dreghorn parish churchyard.

Potatoes were first heard of in Scotland in 1701 when the Duchess of Buccleuch recorded in her household book the purchase of a peck at 2/6d. They were served occasionally at the Earl of Eglinton's table in 1733 (Gauldie 1981).

== See also ==
- Annick Lodge
- Auchenharvie Castle
- Chapeltoun
- Corsehill
- Girgenti House
- Lambroughton
- Perceton
- Cunninghamhead
- A Researcher's Guide to Local History terminology
- Thorntoun Estate
- Cunninghamhead Estate
- Bourtreehill House
