= Intersection (disambiguation) =

Intersection or intersect may refer to:

- Intersection for the Arts, oldest alternative non-profit art space in San Francisco
- Intersection in mathematics, including:
  - Intersection (set theory), the set of elements common to some collection of sets
  - Intersection (geometry)
  - Intersection theory
- Intersection (road), a place where two roads meet (line-line intersection)
- Intersection (aviation), a virtual navigational fix
- Intersection (land navigation), a method of obtaining a fix on an unknown position from two mapped points
- Intersection matrix in DE-9IM, the dimensionally extended nine-intersection model
- Intersectionality, a sociological theory about categorizations (e.g. ethnicity, gender, and religion) and the way those categorizations interact
- Intersect (SQL), a set operator in SQL
- Intersect (video game)
- Logical conjunction
- Intersection (group), a Japanese boy band

== Media ==
- Intersection (novel), a 1967 novel by Paul Guimard
  - Intersection (1994 film), a 1994 remake of the French film Les Choses de la vie, based on Guimard's novel
- Collision (2013 film) a.k.a. Intersection, a French thriller film
- Intersection (album), 2012 album by Nanci Griffith
- An element in the reality TV series The Amazing Race
- Intersections (1985–2005), a 2006 music CD box set released by Bruce Hornsby
- Intersections (Mekong Delta album), 2012
- Intersect (2020 film), an American thriller film

== Places ==
- Intersections, Virginia

== Events ==
- Intersection, 53rd World Science Fiction Convention, held in Glasgow, Scotland, in 1995
- Intersections (arts festival)
