= Overlap (term rewriting) =

Situation in which there are contradictory ways of reducing a mathematical expression

In mathematics, computer science and logic, overlap, as a property of the reduction rules in term rewriting system, describes a situation where a number of different reduction rules specify potentially contradictory ways of reducing a reducible expression, also known as a redex, within a term.

More precisely, if a number of different reduction rules share function symbols on the left-hand side, overlap can occur. Often we do not consider trivial overlap with a redex and itself.

== Examples ==
Consider the term rewriting system defined by the following reduction rules:

$$\rho_1\ :\ f(g(x), y) \rightarrow y$$
$$\rho_2\ :\ g(x) \rightarrow f(x, x)$$

The term $f(g(x), y)$ can be reduced via ρ_{1} to yield y, but it can also be reduced via ρ_{2} to yield $f(f(x, x), y).$. Note how the redex $g(x)$ is contained in the redex $f(g(x), y)$. The result of reducing different redexes is described in a what is known as a critical pair; the critical pair arising out of this term rewriting system is $(f(f(x, x), y), y)$.

Overlap may occur with fewer than two reduction rules.

Consider the term rewriting system defined by the following reduction rule:

$$\rho_1\ :\ g(g(x)) \rightarrow x$$

The term $g(g(g(x)))$ has overlapping redexes, which can be either applied to the innermost occurrence or to the outermost occurrence of the $g(g(x))$ term.
