= Over =

Over may refer to:

== Places ==
- Over, Cambridgeshire, England, a village
- Over, Cheshire, England, a suburb of Winsford
- Over, South Gloucestershire, Gloucestershire, England, a village near Bristol
  - Over Bridge, across the Severn
- Over, Tewkesbury, Gloucestershire, England, a village near Gloucester
- Over, Seevetal, Germany, a village in Lower Saxony

== Music ==
=== Albums ===
- Over (album), by Peter Hammill, 1977
- Over (EP), by Jarboe and Telecognac, 2000

=== Songs ===
- "Over" (Blake Shelton song)
- "Over" (Drake song)
- "Over" (Evans Blue song)
- "Over" (Fayray song)
- "OVER" (Hey! Say! JUMP song)
- "Over" (High and Mighty Color song)
- "Over" (Lindsay Lohan song)
- "Over" (Lucky Daye song)
- "Over" (Portishead song)
- "Over", by A Perfect Circle from Mer de Noms
- "Over", by Ashanti from Ashanti
- "Over", by Embrace from If You've Never Been
- "Over", by Ivy from Realistic
- "Over", by James Blunt from The Afterlove
- "Over", by Jimmy Eat World from Stay on My Side Tonight
- "Over", by Kings of Leon from Walls
- "Over", by Lykke Li on Eyeye
- "Over", by Playboi Carti on Whole Lotta Red
- "Over", by Seafret on Tell Me It's Real
- "Over", by Sean Kingston from Tomorrow
- "Over", by Sistar from So Cool
- "Over", by Tove Lo on Truth Serum
- "Over", by Yuma Uchida
- "Over", by Zarif from Box of Secrets
- "Over", a commonly used unofficial title for a studio outtake by Cardiacs included on Toy World

== Other uses ==
- Over (cricket), a division of play in the sport of cricket
- Over (Bobobo-bo Bo-bobo), a fictional character in the anime/manga Bobobo-bo Bo-bobo
- "Over" (Breaking Bad), an episode from season two of Breaking Bad
- Over, a radiotelephony procedure word
- Over, a professional wrestling term
- OVER, a clause found in SQL window functions

== See also ==
- Over church (disambiguation)
- "Over and Over", a song by Wilson Phillips, on the B-side from the single "Hold On"
