= Lea (surname) =

Lea is a surname. Notable people with the surname include:

== In music ==
- Brandin Lea, the lead singer of Texas-based band Flickerstick and side project The February Chorus
- Gaelynn Lea, an American folk singer, violinist, public speaker and disability advocate
- Jim Lea (born 1949), English bass guitarist (Slade)

== In the military ==
- Edward Lea (1837–1863), United States Navy officer during the American Civil War
- Homer Lea (1876–1912), American general in the army of Sun Yat-sen and a writer of several books of geopolitics; cousin to Thomas C. Lea
- Thomas Calloway Lea, Jr. (1877–1945), American attorney and mayor of El Paso from 1915 to 1917; cousin to Homer Lea

== In politics ==
- Alfred R. Lea (1853–1931), American politician
- Benjamin J. Lea (1833–1894), judge and Attorney General of Tennessee
- Chris Lea, the first openly gay political party leader in Canadian history
- Luke Lea, American politicians
- Pryor Lea (1794–1879), two-term U.S. Representative from Tennessee
- Preston Lea (1841–1916), American businessman and politician, Governor of Delaware
- Sir Thomas Lea, 1st Baronet (1841–1902), Liberal MP for Kidderminster (1868–1874)
- Walter Maxfield Lea (1874–1936), Prince Edward Island politician

== In sports ==
- Arthur Lea (footballer) (1866–1945), Welsh international footballer
- Charlie Lea (1956–2011), former starting pitcher in Major League Baseball
- Cyril Lea (born 1934), Welsh footballer
- Isaac Lea (footballer) (1911–1972), English professional footballer
- Jim Lea (athlete) (1932–2010), American sprinter
- Leslie Lea (born 1942), former English footballer

== In other fields ==
- Albert Miller Lea (1808–1891), American military officer and topographical engineer
- Albert Mayrant Lea (1848–1901), American lawyer in Mississippi
- Arthur Mills Lea (1868–1932), Australian entomologist
- Doug Lea, professor of Computer Science at State University of New York at Oswego where he specializes in concurrent programming
- Henry Charles Lea (1825–1909), American publisher, civic activist, philanthropist and historian
- Isaac Lea (1792–1886), American publisher, conchologist and geologist
- Larry Lea (born 1951), American televangelist
- Margaret Lea Houston, former First Lady of the Republic of Texas
- Mathew Carey Lea (1823–1897), American chemist
- Nancy Moffette Lea (1780–1864), mother of Margaret Lea Houston and mother-in-law of Sam Houston
- Ron Lea (born 1952), Canadian actor
- Sheila Lea (1901–1992), British artist
- Thomas C. Lea, III (1907–2001), American muralist, illustrator, artist, war correspondent, novelist, and historian

== See also ==
- Justice Lea (disambiguation)
- Lea (disambiguation)
- Leah
- Lee (disambiguation)
- Leigh (disambiguation)
