= Lea =

Lea or LEA may refer to:

== Places ==
=== Australia ===
- Lea River, Tasmania, Australia
- Lake Lea, Tasmania, from which the Lea River flows
- RAAF Base Learmonth, IATA airport code "LEA"

=== England ===
- Lea, Cheshire, a civil parish
- Lea, Derbyshire, a settlement in the civil parish of Dethick, Lea and Holloway
- Lea, Devon, a location
- Lea, Herefordshire, a village and civil parish
- Lea, Lancashire, a village
- Lea, Lincolnshire, a small village and civil parish
- Lea, Lydham, a location in Shropshire
- Lea, Pontesbury, a location in Shropshire
- Lea, Wiltshire, a village
- River Lea, a tributary of the Thames
  - Lea Bridge, Greater London, the area around the bridge over the River Lea

=== Elsewhere ===
- Lea, a river in Biscay, Basque Country, Spain
- Lea County, New Mexico, United States

== People and fictional characters ==
- Lea (given name), a list of people and fictional characters
- Lea (surname), a list of people
- Helena Nordheim (1903–1943), Dutch Olympic champion gymnast nicknamed "Lea"
- Lea (musician) (stylized as LEA), stage name of German singer-songwriter and keyboardist Lea-Marie Becker (born 1992)

== Arts and entertainment ==
- Liberian Entertainment Awards (LEA), an annual Liberian music awards show
- Léa (film), a 2011 French film
- Lea (album), a 1988 studio album by Lea Salonga
- Lea (film), a 1997 Czech drama directed by Ivan Fíla
- Lea (play), a 1869 Finnish play by Aleksis Kivi
- "Lea", a song from the 1986 album Fahrenheit by Toto

== Education ==
- Lea College, Albert Lea, Minnesota, United States, a private liberal arts college from 1966 to 1973
- Local education authority, a public body in the United Kingdom

== Government and politics ==
- Labour Electoral Association, British Liberal-Labour organisation
- Law enforcement agency, or law enforcement authority, in North America
- Local electoral area, a district for local elections in Ireland

== Military ==
- Operation Léa, a French Union operation during the First Indochina War
- USS Lea (DD-118), a destroyer that served during both world wars

== Technology ==
- Late embryogenesis abundant proteins (LEA proteins), proteins that protect against protein aggregation due to dehydration or osmotic stress
- LEA (cipher), a lightweight block cipher
- Load effective address, a computer instruction
- Length extension attack, a cryptographic attack
- LEA, a General Motors car engine; see GM Ecotec engine
- LEA, a Honda car engine; see Honda L engine

== Codes and symbols ==
- LEA, Lear Corporation New York Stock Exchange symbol
- lea, ISO 639-3 code of Shabunda Lega language of the Democratic Republic of the Congo
- LEA, Leagrave railway station's United Kingdom station code

== Other uses ==
- Lea baronets, a title in the baronetage of the United Kingdom
- Lea (katydid), a genus of katydid
- LEA proteins (Late Embryogenesis Abundant proteins)
- Lea test or LEA Vision Test System, a series of pediatric vision tests
- Lea (unit), a former British unit of length
- Lea (magazine), a German weekly women's magazine

== See also ==
- Small River Lea, a tributary of the River Lea
- Leah (disambiguation)
- Lee (disambiguation)
- Leigh (disambiguation)
- LEAS (disambiguation)
