= LEHS =

LEHS may refer to these secondary schools:

== England ==
- Lady Eleanor Holles School, a South West London private school

== United States ==
- Lugoff-Elgin High School, Lugoff, South Carolina
- Lakota East High School, Liberty Township, Ohio
- English High School (Lynn, Massachusetts)
- Logan Elm High School, Circleville, Ohio
- Little Elm High School, Little Elm, Texas

== See also ==
- Leh (disambiguation)
- Leh's, a closed store in Allentown, Pennsylvania, United States
- LES (disambiguation)
- Less (disambiguation)
- Lez (disambiguation)
- Lay (disambiguation)
