= Vice President Lee =

Vice President Lee, Vice President Li or Vice President Yi may refer to:

- Lee Teng-hui (1923–2020), 7th Vice President of the Republic of China
- Lee Yuan-tsu (1923–2017), 8th Vice President of the Republic of China
- Li Yuanhong (1864–1928), Provisional Vice President of the Republic of China
- Li Zongren (1890–1969), 1st Vice President of the Republic of China
- Yi Si-yeong (Lee Si-yeong; 1868–1953), 1st Vice President of the South Korea

== See also ==
- Lee (surname)
- President Lee (disambiguation)
- Prime Minister Lee (disambiguation)
