= Lay =

Lay or LAY may refer to:

== Places ==
- Lay Range, a subrange of mountains in British Columbia, Canada
- Lay, Loire, a French commune
- Lay (river), France
- Lay, Iran, a village
- Lay, Kansas, United States, an unincorporated community
- Lay Dam, Alabama, United States

== People ==
- Lay (surname)
- Lay Bankz (born 2004), American rapper
- Lay Raksmey (born 1989), Cambodian footballer
- Lay Zhang, Chinese singer, music producer, actor, and member of the K-pop boy group Exo

== Poetry ==
- A short ballad or lyrical poem
- Breton lai or simply lai, a form of medieval French and English romance literature
- Heroic lay, a Germanic work of narrative verse

== Other uses ==
- Lay, relating to laity, non-ordained Christians
- Lay, relating to layman's terms
- Lea (unit), obsolete unit of length sometimes spelled "Lay"
- LA-Y, Yoshinobu Launch Complex, in Tanegashima, Japan
- A characteristic of material surface finish
- In betting, see Betting exchange § Backing and laying

== See also ==
- Lay's, a potato-chip brand name and company
- Ley (disambiguation)
- Lai (disambiguation)
