= Leh (disambiguation) =

Leh is a city in Ladakh, Indian Kashmir.

Leh or LEH may refer to:

== Places ==
=== Asia ===
- Leh district, Ladakh, India
  - Leh Palace, Leh

=== Europe ===
- Léh, a village in Northern Hungary
- Lady Eleanor Holles School, South West London, England
- Lea Hall railway station, West Midlands, England (CRS code: LEH)
- Le Havre – Octeville Airport, Normandy, France (IATA code: LEH)

=== Elsewhere ===
- Lower Erebus Hut, on Ross Island off Antarctica
- Leh's, a closed store in Allentown, Pennsylvania, United States

== People ==
- Dennis Leh (born 1946), American politician
- Leh Keen (born 1983), American racecar driver

== Other uses ==
- Linear enamel hypoplasia
- Lehman Brothers, an insolvent American investment bank (NYSE symbol: LEH)
- Lenje language, spoken in Zambia (ISO 639-3: leh)

== See also ==
- Leah (disambiguation)
- Lee (disambiguation)
- Le (disambiguation)
- LEHS (disambiguation)
