= Paintbrush Canyon =

Canyon in the state of Wyoming

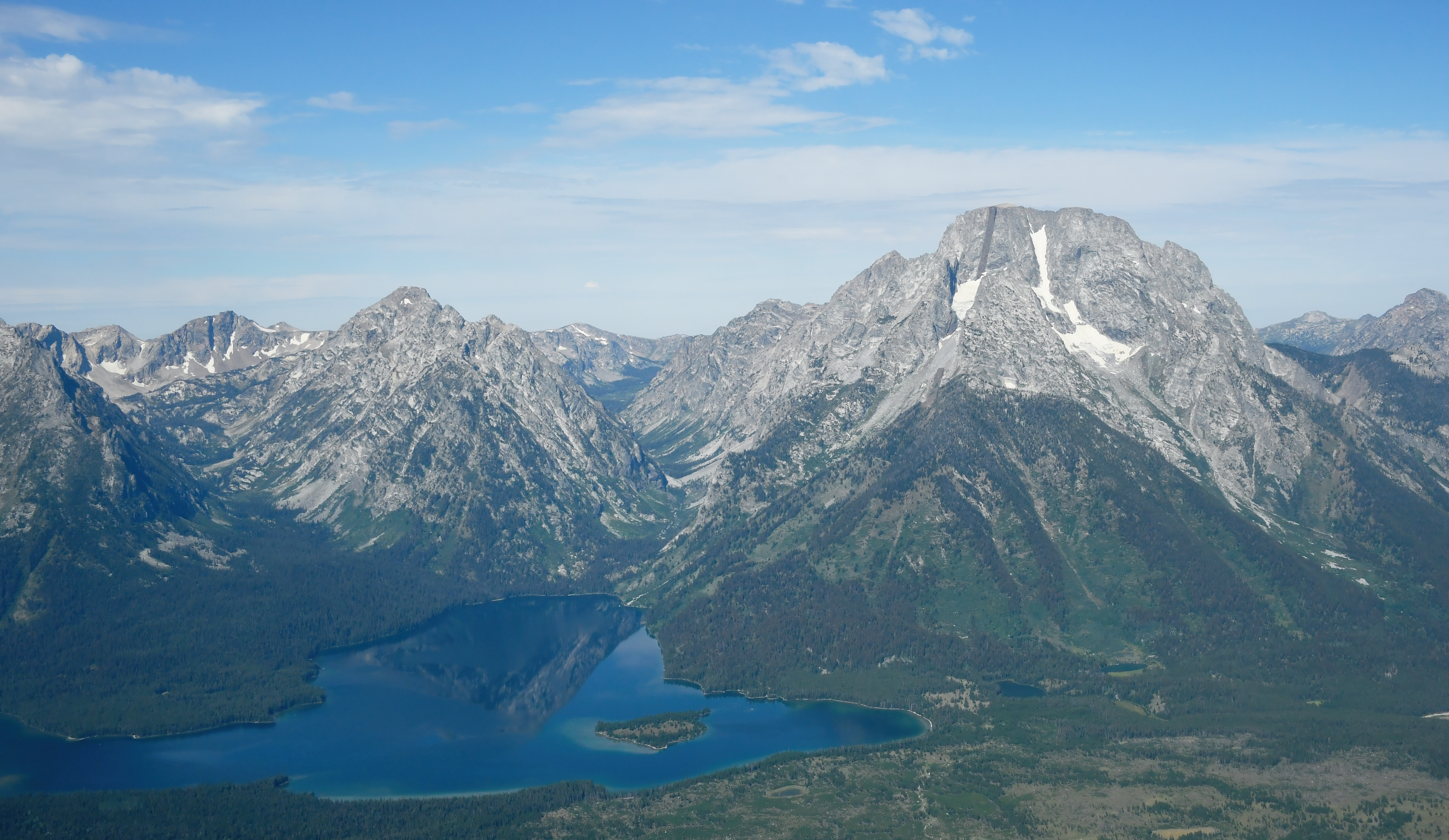
- Paintbrush Canyon, Mount Woodring, Leigh Canyon, and Mount Moran (from left to right) with Leigh Lake below

Geography
- Country: United States
- State: Wyoming
- County: Teton
- Coordinates: 43°48′43″N 110°45′11″W
- Lake: Leigh Lake
- Interactive map of Paintbrush Canyon

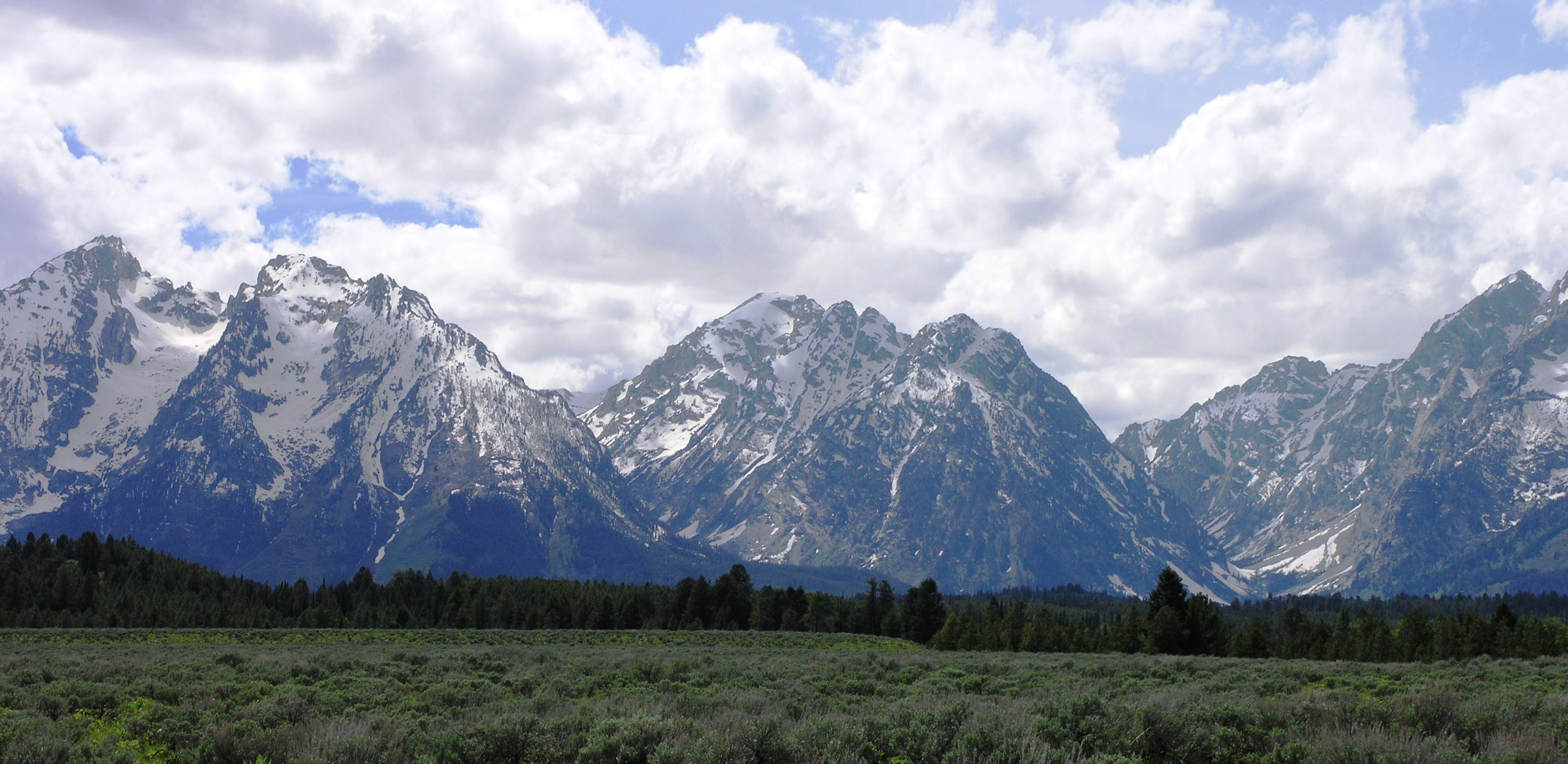
Mount Saint John and Rockchuck Peak at left flank Paintbrush Canyon as does Mount Woodring at center. Leigh Canyon and the southern slope of Mount Moran are at right

Paintbrush Canyon is located in Grand Teton National Park, in the U. S. state of Wyoming. The canyon was formed by glaciers which retreated at the end of the Last Glacial Maximum approximately 15,000 years ago. The canyon lies between Rockchuck Peak and Mount Saint John to the south and Mount Woodring to the north. Leigh Lake is at the base of the canyon to the east and the alpine Holly Lake is located mid canyon. Popular with hikers, the canyon is part of a popular circuit hike of 19.2 miles (30.9 km) which is rated as very strenuous and includes a total elevation change of 3,845 feet (1,172 m) due to the ascent to Paintbrush Divide 10,720 feet (3,270 m). Views from Paintbrush Divide include Lake Solitude (which is also passed on the circuit hike) and of Mount Moran to the north and the Cathedral Group including Grand Teton to the south. An ice axe may be necessary for hikes in the early summer. The Paintbrush Canyon Trail is part of the Teton Crest Trail, which spans the southern section of the Teton Range from Teton Pass along Wyoming Highway 22 to String Lake, a total distance of 39 miles (63 km).

== See also ==
- Canyons of the Teton Range
- Geology of the Grand Teton area
