= Leigh =

Leigh may refer to:

== Places ==
=== In England ===
Pronounced /ˈliː/:

- Leigh, Greater Manchester, Borough of Wigan
  - Leigh (UK Parliament constituency)
- Leigh-on-Sea, Essex

Pronounced /ˈlaɪ/:

- Leigh, Dorset
- Leigh, Gloucestershire
- Leigh, Kent
- Leigh, Staffordshire
- Leigh, Surrey
- Leigh, Wiltshire
- Leigh, Worcestershire
- Leigh-on-Mendip, Somerset (also known as Leigh upon Mendip)
- Leigh Delamere, Wiltshire
- Leigh Green, Kent
- Leigh Park, Hampshire
- Leigh Sinton, Worcestershire
- Leigh Woods, Somerset
- Abbots Leigh, Somerset
- East Leigh, Devon
- Little Leigh, Cheshire
- Little Leighs, Essex
- North Leigh, Oxfordshire

=== United States ===
- Leigh, Nebraska
- Leigh, Texas, United States, the location of historic site Mimosa Hall
- Leigh Canyon and Leigh Lake, Wyoming

=== Elsewhere ===
- Leigh, County Tipperary, Ireland
- Leigh, New South Wales, in Bellingen Shire, Australia
- Leigh, New Zealand
- Leigh River (Victoria), Australia

== Other uses ==
- Leigh (name), a surname and given name
- Baron Leigh of Stoneleigh, Warwickshire, England
- Leigh & Orange, Hong Kong
- Leigh Leopards, a rugby league football club in Greater Manchester
- Leigh's disease, a rare neurometabolic disorder of the central nervous system
- Leigh Light, an antisubmarine device used in World War II

== See also ==
- LEA (disambiguation)
- Leah (disambiguation)
- Lee (disambiguation)
- Austen-Leigh
