= List of United Kingdom locations: Lea-Lei =

The United Kingdom

This is part of the list of United Kingdom locations: a gazetteer of place names in the United Kingdom showing each place's locality and geographical coordinates.

== Lea-Lei ==
Location	Locality	Coordinates (links to map & photo sources)	OS grid reference
Lea	Derbyshire	53.10°N 01.52°W	SK3257
Lea	Devon	50.78°N 03.07°W	SY2499
Lea	Herefordshire	51.88°N 02.50°W	SO6521
Lea	Lancashire	53.76°N 02.77°W	SD4930
Lea	Lincolnshire	53.36°N 00.76°W	SK8286
Lea (Lydham)	Shropshire	52.49°N 02.95°W	SO3589
Lea (Pontesbury)	Shropshire	52.66°N 02.87°W	SJ4108
Lea	Wiltshire	51.57°N 02.07°W	ST9586
Lea Bridge	Hackney	51.55°N 00.05°W	TQ3586
Leabrooks	Derbyshire	53.07°N 01.38°W	SK4153
Lea by Backford	Cheshire	53.23°N 02.91°W	SJ3971
Leacainn	Western Isles	57.90°N 06.84°W	NB1301
Leac a Li	Western Isles	57.82°N 06.85°W	NG1292
Leacanashie	Highland	57.35°N 05.57°W	NG8535
Leachkin	Highland	57.46°N 04.28°W	NH6344
Leadburn	Scottish Borders	55.78°N 03.22°W	NT2355
Leadendale	Staffordshire	52.94°N 02.12°W	SJ9239
Leadenham	Lincolnshire	53.05°N 00.58°W	SK9552
Leaden Roding	Essex	51.79°N 00.30°E	TL5913
Leadgate	Cumbria	54.78°N 02.46°W	NY7043
Leadgate	Durham	54.85°N 01.81°W	NZ1251
Leadgate	Gateshead	54.92°N 01.82°W	NZ1159
Leadhills	South Lanarkshire	55.41°N 03.77°W	NS8815
Leadingcross Green	Kent	51.22°N 00.70°E	TQ8951
Leadmill	Derbyshire	53.31°N 01.65°W	SK2380
Leadmill	Flintshire	53.16°N 03.13°W	SJ2464
Lea End	Worcestershire	52.37°N 01.94°W	SP0475
Leafield	Oxfordshire	51.83°N 01.55°W	SP3115
Leafield	Wiltshire	51.42°N 02.20°W	ST8669
Lea Forge	Cheshire	53.02°N 02.44°W	SJ7048
Leagrave	Luton	51.89°N 00.47°W	TL0523
Leagreen	Hampshire	50.73°N 01.61°W	SZ2793
Lea Green	St Helens	53.42°N 02.75°W	SJ5092
Lea Hall	Birmingham	52.47°N 01.79°W	SP1486
Lea Heath	Staffordshire	52.83°N 01.97°W	SK0226
Leake	Lincolnshire	53.01°N 00.11°E	TF4249
Leake	North Yorkshire	54.30°N 01.34°W	SE4390
Leake Commonside	Lincolnshire	53.04°N 00.07°E	TF3952
Leake Fold Hill	Lincolnshire	53.03°N 00.08°E	TF4051
Lealholm	North Yorkshire	54.45°N 00.82°W	NZ7607
Lealholm Side	North Yorkshire	54.46°N 00.82°W	NZ7608
Lea Line	Herefordshire	51.88°N 02.49°W	SO6621
Lealt	Highland	57.56°N 06.18°W	NG5060
Leam	Derbyshire	53.30°N 01.65°W	SK2379
Lea Marston	Warwickshire	52.53°N 01.70°W	SP2093
Leamington Hastings	Warwickshire	52.29°N 01.35°W	SP4467
Leomansley	Staffordshire	52.67°N 01.85°W	SK1009
Leamoor Common	Shropshire	52.46°N 02.85°W	SO4286
Leamore	Walsall	52.59°N 02.01°W	SJ9900
Leamside	Durham	54.80°N 01.51°W	NZ3146
Leanach	Highland	57.46°N 04.08°W	NH7544
Leapgate	Worcestershire	52.34°N 02.25°W	SO8372
Leargybreck	Argyll and Bute	55.86°N 05.93°W	NR5471
Lease Rigg	North Yorkshire	54.42°N 00.73°W	NZ8204
Leasey Bridge	Hertfordshire	51.81°N 00.31°W	TL1614
Leasgill	Cumbria	54.24°N 02.78°W	SD4984
Leasingham	Lincolnshire	53.01°N 00.43°W	TF0548
Leasingthorne	Durham	54.65°N 01.61°W	NZ2529
Leason	Swansea	51.60°N 04.19°W	SS4892
Leasowe	Wirral	53.41°N 03.09°W	SJ2791
Leatherhead	Surrey	51.29°N 00.33°W	TQ1656
Leatherhead Common	Surrey	51.30°N 00.33°W	TQ1658
Leathern Bottle	Gloucestershire	51.69°N 02.40°W	SO7200
Leathley	North Yorkshire	53.91°N 01.65°W	SE2347
Leaton (Wrockwardine)	Shropshire	52.69°N 02.57°W	SJ6111
Leaton (Pimhill)	Shropshire	52.75°N 02.80°W	SJ4618
Leaton Heath	Shropshire	52.75°N 02.81°W	SJ4518
Lea Town	Lancashire	53.77°N 02.80°W	SD4731
Lea Valley	Hertfordshire	51.82°N 00.33°W	TL1515
Leaveland	Kent	51.24°N 00.86°E	TR0053
Leavenheath	Suffolk	51.98°N 00.83°E	TL9536
Leavening	North Yorkshire	54.05°N 00.80°W	SE7863
Leavesden	Hertfordshire	51.68°N 00.42°W	TL0900
Leaves Green	Bromley	51.33°N 00.02°E	TQ4161
Lea Yeat	Cumbria	54.26°N 02.37°W	SD7686
Lebberston	North Yorkshire	54.22°N 00.36°W	TA0782
Leburnick	Cornwall	50.60°N 04.33°W	SX3581
Lechlade	Gloucestershire	51.68°N 01.69°W	SU2199
Leck	Lancashire	54.17°N 02.55°W	SD6476
Leckford	Hampshire	51.13°N 01.47°W	SU3737
Leckfurin	Highland	58.50°N 04.23°W	NC7059
Leckhampstead	Berkshire	51.48°N 01.38°W	SU4376
Leckhampstead	Buckinghamshire	52.02°N 00.95°W	SP7237
Leckhampstead Thicket	Berkshire	51.48°N 01.39°W	SU4276
Leckhampton	Gloucestershire	51.86°N 02.08°W	SO9419
Leckmelm	Highland	57.86°N 05.10°W	NH1690
Leckwith	The Vale Of Glamorgan	51.45°N 03.22°W	ST1574
Leconfield	East Riding of Yorkshire	53.87°N 00.46°W	TA0143
Ledaig (Ardchattan)	Argyll and Bute	56.47°N 05.41°W	NM9037
Ledaig (Tobermory)	Argyll and Bute	56.62°N 06.07°W	NM5055
Ledaig (Barra)	Western Isles	56.94°N 07.49°W	NL6697
Ledburn	Buckinghamshire	51.88°N 00.69°W	SP9021
Ledbury	Herefordshire	52.03°N 02.43°W	SO7037
Leddington	Gloucestershire	52.00°N 02.45°W	SO6934
Ledicot	Herefordshire	52.25°N 02.86°W	SO4162
Lednabirichen	Highland	57.90°N 04.11°W	NH7592
Lednagullin	Highland	58.54°N 04.06°W	NC8064
Ledsham	Cheshire	53.25°N 02.97°W	SJ3574
Ledsham	Leeds	53.75°N 01.31°W	SE4529
Ledston	Leeds	53.74°N 01.34°W	SE4328
Ledstone	Devon	50.30°N 03.77°W	SX7446
Ledston Luck	Leeds	53.76°N 01.36°W	SE4230
Ledwell	Oxfordshire	51.94°N 01.39°W	SP4228
Lee	Argyll and Bute	56.31°N 06.20°W	NM4021
Lee (near Berrynarbor)	Devon	51.19°N 04.07°W	SS5546
Lee (or Lee Bay, near Woolacombe)	Devon	51.19°N 04.17°W	SS4846
Lee	Hampshire	50.95°N 01.48°W	SU3617
Lee	Lewisham	51.44°N 00.00°E	TQ3974
Lee	Northumberland	54.92°N 02.09°W	NY9459
Lee	Shropshire	52.88°N 02.89°W	SJ4032
Leeans	Shetland Islands	60.20°N 01.40°W	HU3347
Lee Bank	Birmingham	52.47°N 01.91°W	SP0686
Leebitten	Shetland Islands	59.99°N 01.24°W	HU4224
Leebotwood	Shropshire	52.57°N 02.78°W	SO4798
Lee Brockhurst	Shropshire	52.83°N 02.68°W	SJ5427
Leece	Cumbria	54.11°N 03.16°W	SD2469
Lee Chapel	Essex	51.56°N 00.43°E	TQ6988
Leechpool	Monmouthshire	51.59°N 02.72°W	ST5089
Lee Clump	Buckinghamshire	51.72°N 00.69°W	SP9004
Lee Common	Buckinghamshire	51.72°N 00.69°W	SP9004
Leeds	Kent	51.23°N 00.60°E	TQ8252
Leeds	City of Leeds	53.80°N 01.54°W	SE3034
Leedstown	Cornwall	50.15°N 05.36°W	SW6034
Leeford	Devon	51.21°N 03.76°W	SS7748
Lee Gate	Buckinghamshire	51.73°N 00.71°W	SP8905
Leegomery	Shropshire	52.70°N 02.50°W	SJ6612
Lee Green	Lewisham	51.44°N 00.00°E	TQ3974
Lee Ground	Hampshire	50.86°N 01.23°W	SU5408
Lee Head	Derbyshire	53.42°N 02.00°W	SK0092
Leeholme	Durham	54.66°N 01.62°W	NZ2430
Leek	Staffordshire	53.10°N 02.03°W	SJ9856
Leekbrook	Staffordshire	53.07°N 02.03°W	SJ9853
Leek Wootton	Warwickshire	52.31°N 01.57°W	SP2969
Lee Mill	Devon	50.37°N 03.98°W	SX5955
Leeming	Bradford	53.80°N 01.94°W	SE0434
Leeming	North Yorkshire	54.29°N 01.55°W	SE2989
Leeming Bar	North Yorkshire	54.30°N 01.57°W	SE2890
Lee Moor	Devon	50.43°N 04.02°W	SX5661
Lee Moor	Wakefield	53.72°N 01.48°W	SE3425
Lee-on-the-Solent	Hampshire	50.79°N 01.20°W	SU5600
Lee-over-Sands	Essex	51.76°N 01.04°E	TM1012
Lees	Derbyshire	52.93°N 01.61°W	SK2637
Lees	Oldham	53.53°N 02.07°W	SD9504
Leesthorpe	Leicestershire	52.70°N 00.84°W	SK7813
Leeswood (Coed-Llai)	Sir y Fflint (Flintshire)	53.12°N 03.09°W	SJ2759
Leetown	Perth and Kinross	56.37°N 03.28°W	NO2121
Leftwich	Cheshire	53.24°N 02.51°W	SJ6672
Legar	Powys	51.84°N 03.14°W	SO2117
Legbourne	Lincolnshire	53.33°N 00.04°E	TF3684
Legburthwaite	Cumbria	54.56°N 03.06°W	NY3119
Legerwood	Scottish Borders	55.67°N 02.66°W	NT5843
Leggatt Hill	West Sussex	50.99°N 00.69°W	SU9223
Legsby	Lincolnshire	53.35°N 00.30°W	TF1385
Leicester	City of Leicester	52.63°N 01.14°W	SK5804
Leicester Forest East	Leicestershire	52.62°N 01.21°W	SK5303
Leicester Grange	Warwickshire	52.50°N 01.36°W	SP4390
Leigh	Devon	50.89°N 03.82°W	SS7212
Leigh (Ibberton, North Dorset)	Dorset	50.87°N 02.31°W	ST7808
Leigh (West Dorset)	Dorset	50.87°N 02.55°W	ST6108
Leigh	Kent	51.19°N 00.21°E	TQ5546
Leigh	Poole, Dorset	50.79°N 01.97°W	SZ0299
Leigh	Shropshire	52.62°N 02.99°W	SJ3303
Leigh	Surrey	51.20°N 00.25°W	TQ2246
Leigh	Wigan	53.49°N 02.52°W	SD6500
Leigh	Wiltshire	51.62°N 01.91°W	SU0692
Leigh	Worcestershire	52.17°N 02.32°W	SO7853
Leigham	Devon	50.40°N 04.09°W	SX5158
Leigh Beck	Essex	51.50°N 00.60°E	TQ8182
Leigh Common	Somerset	51.05°N 02.37°W	ST7429
Leigh Delamere	Wiltshire	51.51°N 02.17°W	ST8879
Leigh Green	Kent	51.05°N 00.71°E	TQ9032
Leighland Chapel	Somerset	51.11°N 03.38°W	ST0336
Leigh-on-Sea	Essex	51.54°N 00.65°E	TQ8486
Leigh Park	Hampshire	50.86°N 00.99°W	SU7108
Leigh Sinton	Worcestershire	52.14°N 02.33°W	SO7750
Leighswood	Walsall	52.60°N 01.92°W	SK0501
Leighterton	Gloucestershire	51.61°N 02.26°W	ST8291
Leighton	North Yorkshire	54.20°N 01.75°W	SE1679
Leighton	Powys	52.63°N 03.12°W	SJ2405
Leighton	Shropshire	52.64°N 02.57°W	SJ6105
Leighton	Somerset	51.18°N 02.43°W	ST7043
Leighton Bromswold	Cambridgeshire	52.36°N 00.37°W	TL1175
Leighton Buzzard	Bedfordshire	51.91°N 00.66°W	SP9225
Leightonhill	Angus	56.73°N 02.60°W	NO6361
Leigh upon Mendip	Somerset	51.22°N 02.44°W	ST6947
Leigh Woods	North Somerset	51.44°N 02.64°W	ST5572
Leinthall Earls	Herefordshire	52.29°N 02.82°W	SO4467
Leinthall Starkes	Herefordshire	52.31°N 02.83°W	SO4369
Leintwardine	Herefordshire	52.36°N 02.88°W	SO4074
Leire	Leicestershire	52.50°N 01.23°W	SP5290
Leirinmore	Highland	58.55°N 04.71°W	NC4266
Leiston	Suffolk	52.20°N 01.56°E	TM4462
Leitfie	Perth and Kinross	56.59°N 03.22°W	NO2545
Leith	City of Edinburgh	55.97°N 03.17°W	NT2776
Leitholm	Scottish Borders	55.68°N 02.33°W	NT7944
