= Less =

Less or LESS may refer to:

== Computing ==
- less (Unix), a Unix utility program
- Less (style sheet language), a dynamic style sheet language
- Large-Scale Scrum (LeSS), a product development framework that extends Scrum

== Other uses ==
- -less, a privative suffix in English
- Lunar Escape Systems, a series of proposed emergency spacecraft for the Apollo Program
- Christian Friedrich Lessing (1809–1862), (author abbreviation Less.) for German botanist
- Less (novel), a 2017 novel by Andrew Sean Greer
- Lateral electrical surface stimulation, a neuromuscular stimulation treatment for idiopathic scoliosis
- "Less" (song), 2026 song by Olivia Rodrigo

== See also ==
- Fewer versus less
- Less is more (disambiguation)
