= LE =

LE or le may refer to:

== Businesses ==
- Le.com (Leshi Internet or Le), a Chinese technology company
- LeEco (Leshi Technology or LE), a former Chinese technology company

== Government and military ==
- Law enforcement, umbrella term for police, courts and prisons
- French Foreign Legion (French: Légion étrangère)
- Anterior Lê dynasty, Vietnamese dynasty from 980 to 1009
- Lê dynasty, Vietnamese dynasty from 1428 to 1527
- Revival Lê dynasty, Vietnamese dynasty from 1533 to 1789

== People ==
- Le (surname), the romanization of several surnames
- Lê (footballer, born 1964), Ronaldo Francisco Lucato, Brazilian midfielder
- Lê (footballer, born February 1979), Leandro Coelho Cardoso, Brazilian attacking midfielder
- Lê (footballer, born July 1979), Leandro Cesar de Sousa, Brazilian defensive midfielder
- Lê (footballer, born 1984), Leonardo Hermes Lau, Brazilian attacking midfielder
- LE (rapper) (born 1991), South Korean music artist and dancer

== Places ==
- LE postcode area, Leicester, UK
- Province of Lecce (ISO 3166-2:IT code LE), Italy
- London Eye, a ferris wheel on the Thames

== Science and technology ==
=== Chemistry and physics ===
- Lattice energy, the energy of formation of a crystal from infinitely-separated ions
- Lewis number, a dimensionless number ratio in physics
- Ligand efficiency, a measure of the binding energy of a ligand to its binding partner

=== Computing ===
- Linear Executable, an OS/2 file format
- LE (text editor), a simple text editor for unix-like operating systems
- Let's Encrypt, a non-profit certification authority
- Little-endian, a system that stores the least-significant byte at the smallest address

=== Other uses in science ===
- Lunar eclipse, in astronomy
- Lupus erythematosus, autoimmune diseases

== Transportation ==
- Greater Anglia (National Rail code: LE), a British train operating company
- Level (airline) (IATA designation: LE)
- Limited edition, a naming designator for automobiles
- Long Éireannach (LÉ), ship prefix for Irish naval vessels
- Luxury edition, another naming designator for high-end automobiles
- Lakeshore East line (LE) of the GO Transit rail network in Ontario, Canada

== Other uses ==
- Egyptian pound (French: livre égyptienne), the currency of Egypt
- Le, a la♯ musical note in the solfège solmization
- Limited edition
- Long-exposure photography
- L℮, a label of estimated volume (in litres)

== See also ==
- Lee (disambiguation)
- Leah (disambiguation)
- Leh (disambiguation)
- Leo (disambiguation)
