= LEAS =

Leas or LEAS may refer to:

- The Leas, a large area of land owned by the National Trust along the coastal cliffs of South Shields, England
- Terrence Leas, American academic and community college president
- LEAS, ICAO code for Asturias Airport, Asturias, Spain
- Levels of Emotional Awareness Scale, a scenario-based psychological test

== See also ==
- Leas Lift, a funicular railway in Folkestone, Kent, England
- LEA (disambiguation)
