= EJW =

EJW may refer to:

- Econ Journal Watch, an electronic journal
- Equal Justice Works, a US coalition of law student organizations
