= Li Zongtong =

李總統, meaning President Lee, may refer to following presidents of the Republic of China:

- Lee Teng-hui (1923–2020), 4th President of the Republic of China
- Li Zongren (1890–1969), Acting President of the Republic of China

== See also ==
- Li (surname)
- President Lee
- Prime Minister Lee
