= Holly Lake =

Lake in the American state of Wyoming

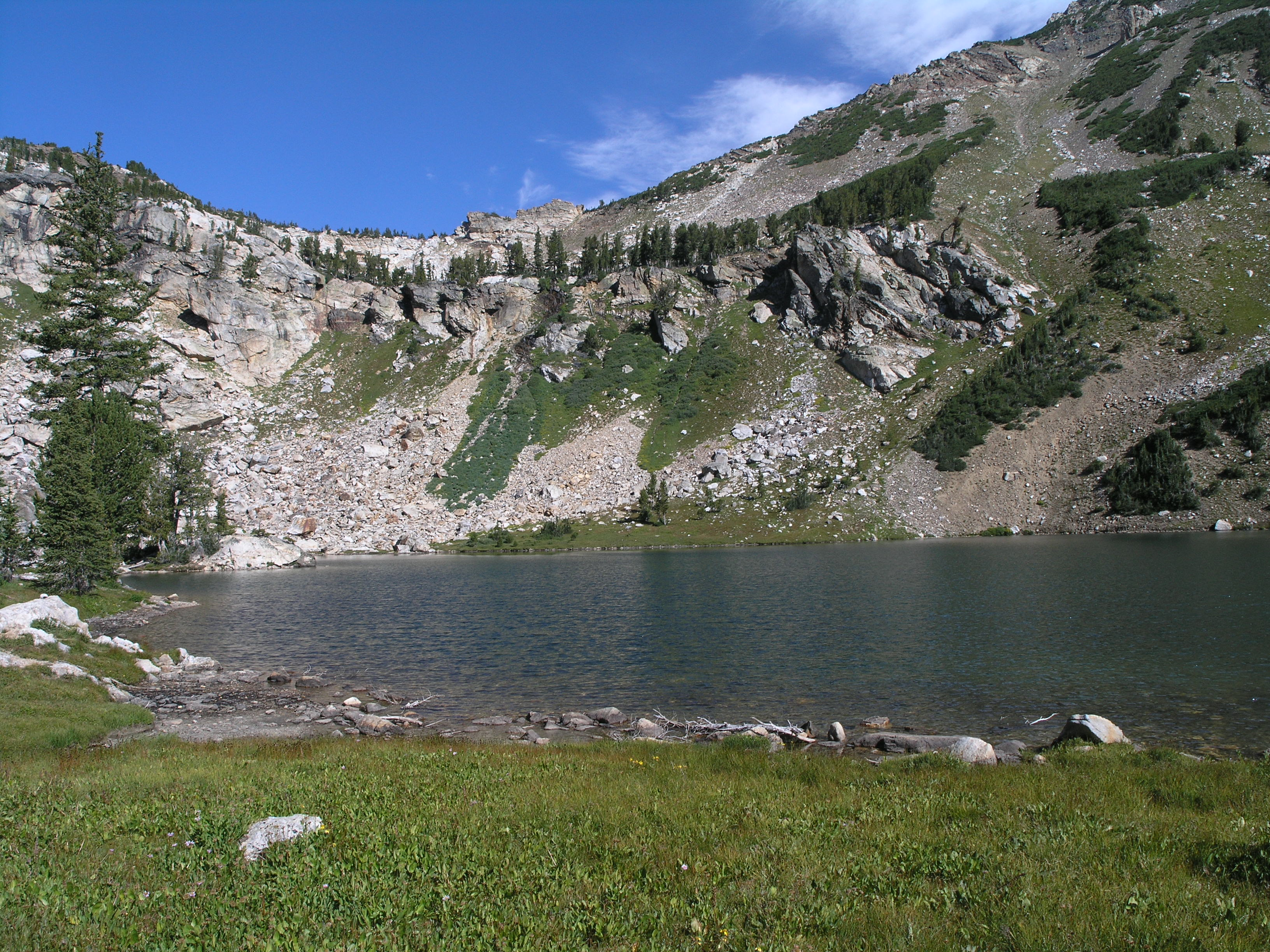
- Holly Lake

- Location within Wyoming
- Location: Grand Teton National Park, Teton County, Wyoming, US
- Coordinates: 43°47′34″N 110°47′53″W
- Lake type: Glacial lake
- Basin countries: United States
- Max. length: .13 mi (0.21 km)
- Max. width: .10 mi (0.16 km)
- Surface elevation: 9,416 ft (2,870 m)

Holly Lake is located in Grand Teton National Park, in the U. S. state of Wyoming. Holly Lake is situated in Paintbrush Canyon and is .70 miles (1.13 km) SSW of Mount Woodring. According to the National Park Service, the hike to Holly Lake is 12.8 miles (20.6 km) round-trip from the String Lake parking lot and involves an altitude gain of 2,840 feet (870 m). Holly Lake is along a side trail of the Paintbrush Canyon-Cascade Canyon loop. There are backcountry camping zones nearby and three specifically designated within a quarter mile of the lake.
