= Orestes St. John =

American geologist and paleontologist (1841–1921)

Orestes Hawley St. John
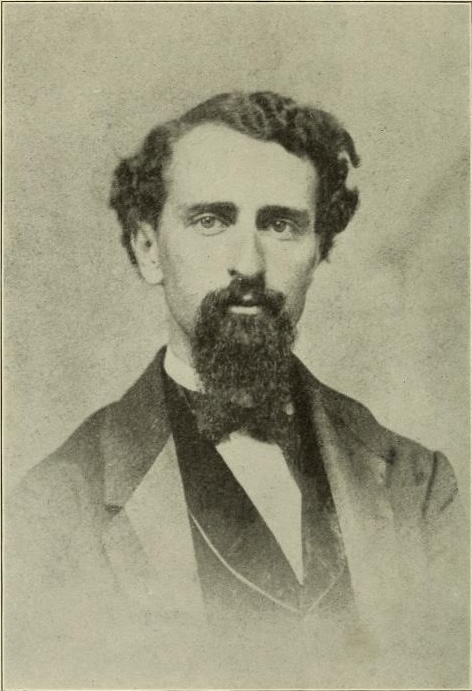
- Born: January 12, 1841; Rock Creek, Ohio, US
- Died: July 20, 1921 (aged 80); San Diego, California, US
- Monuments: Mount Saint John, Wyoming
- Education: Harvard University
- Occupations: Geologist, paleontologist, scientific illustrator
- Employer: U.S. Geological Survey

Orestes Hawley St. John (January 12, 1841 – July 20, 1921) was an American geologist, paleontologist, and scientific illustrator specializing in the study of Paleozoic fossil fish. He trained under Louis Agassiz and worked extensively with the U.S. Geological Survey, participating in the Hayden Geological Survey of 1871.

== Life and career ==
St. John was born in Rock Creek, Ohio, on January 12, 1841. As a child, he and his family moved to Waterloo, Iowa, where he attended public schools before enrolling at Harvard University. He studied under the tutelage of Harvard professor Louis Agassiz and served as a geologist on Agassiz's Thayer Expedition to Brazil in 1865, collecting more than 5,000 specimens and making geological observations. Since childhood, he collected fossils, especially of fish, from the Devonian strata of the Cedar River Valley, and these he deposited in the collection of the Museum of Comparative Zoology.

St. John worked on the Iowa Geological Survey as the deputy of Charles Abiathar White from 1866 to about 1871, and then spent one year serving as chair of natural history at the newly founded Iowa State Agricultural College. He also contributed to the Illinois Geological Survey under Amos Henry Worthen on and off from the 1860s to 1883. In 1872 he returned to Harvard and resuming his position at the museum. He became a leading authority on fossilized fish, writing and illustrating scholarly books and articles on the subject. He again left Harvard after Agassiz died in December 1873.

St. John's five penciled sketches of Iowa geological features, which form the basis of illustrations in the two-volume 1870 Report on the Geological Survey of the State of Iowa, were precise and detailed enough to enable researchers to locate the same sites in 1985, in turn enabling observation of a century of historical changes in land use.

St. John went on to participate in the United States Geological and Geographical Survey of the Territories. In 1878, he led a party of surveyors through Wyoming, surveying the Wind River Mountains, portions of the Gros Ventre Range, the Wyoming Range, and the Snake River Plain. Mount Saint John in Teton County, Wyoming, was named in his honor in 1931. After his survey work ended, he shifted his career path toward economic geology, contributing to the discovery and mining of sprawling coal fields in Girard, Kansas, and the Raton Basin in New Mexico. He held the position of geologist for the Santa Fe Railway for 25 years.

St. John was considered a meticulous researcher and writer. He was one of the first elected fellows of the Geological Society of America. His notebooks, reports, drawings, letters, and other papers are held at the Smithsonian Libraries and Archives.

== Personal life ==
In 1871, St. John married Mary Sophie Swift, a descendant of Jonathan Swift. He retired to San Diego, California, where he died on July 20, 1921, at the age of 80 and was interred at Greenwood Memorial Park.
