= President Lee =

President Lee may refer to:

- Harold B. Lee (1899–1973), president of the Church of Jesus Christ of Latter-day Saints
- Richard Henry Lee (1732–1794), president of the Confederation Congress and president pro tempore of the United States Senate
- Lee Myung-bak (born 1941), president of South Korea from 2008 to 2013
- Lee Jae-myung (born 1963), president of South Korea since 2025

== See also ==
- Lee (surname)
- Prime Minister Lee
- Li Zongtong
