= Premier Li =

Premier Li may refer to:

- Li Jingxi (1857–1925), Premier of the Republic of China
- Li Keqiang (born 1955), 7th Premier of the People's Republic of China
- Li Peng (1928–2019), 4th Premier of the People's Republic of China

== See also ==
- Prime Minister Lee (disambiguation)
