= Lai =

Lai or LAI may refer to:

== Abbreviations ==
- Austrian Latin America Institute (Österreichisches Lateinamerika-Institut)
- Latin American Idol, TV series
- La Trobe Institute, Melbourne, Australia
- Leaf area index, leaf area of a crop or vegetation per unit ground area
- League against Imperialism, transnational anti-imperialist organization in the interwar period
- Liga Atlética Interuniversitaria de Puerto Rico
- Location Area Identity

== Transport ==
- Laindon railway station, Essex, England (National Rail station code LAI)
- Lannion – Côte de Granit Airport, Brittany, France (IATA airport code LAI)

== Places ==
- Lai (state) (萊), 6th-century BC state in present-day Shandong, China
- Bolyu language, also known as Lai
- Laï, city in Chad
- Lai, Iran (disambiguation), places in Iran
- Lai, village in Lum Choar, Cambodia
- Lai, Romansch name for Lenzerheide, a village in Switzerland

== Surname ==
- Lai (surname), 賴 Chinese, Vietnamese surname.
- Lí (surname 黎), Lai in Cantonese
- Francis Lai (1932–2018), French composer
- Maria Lai (1919-2013), Italian artist
- Valentino Lai (born 1984), Swedish football player

== Science and medicine ==
- Long-acting injectable, a type of drug form

== Other ==
- Battle of Lai, during World War I
- Lai people, ethnic group of Mizoram, North East India
- Lai languages
- Lai (poetic form) or Lay, song form in medieval France
- LAI Games, an arcade game developer

== See also ==
- Lais (disambiguation)
