= Rockchuck Peak =

Mountain in Wyoming, United States

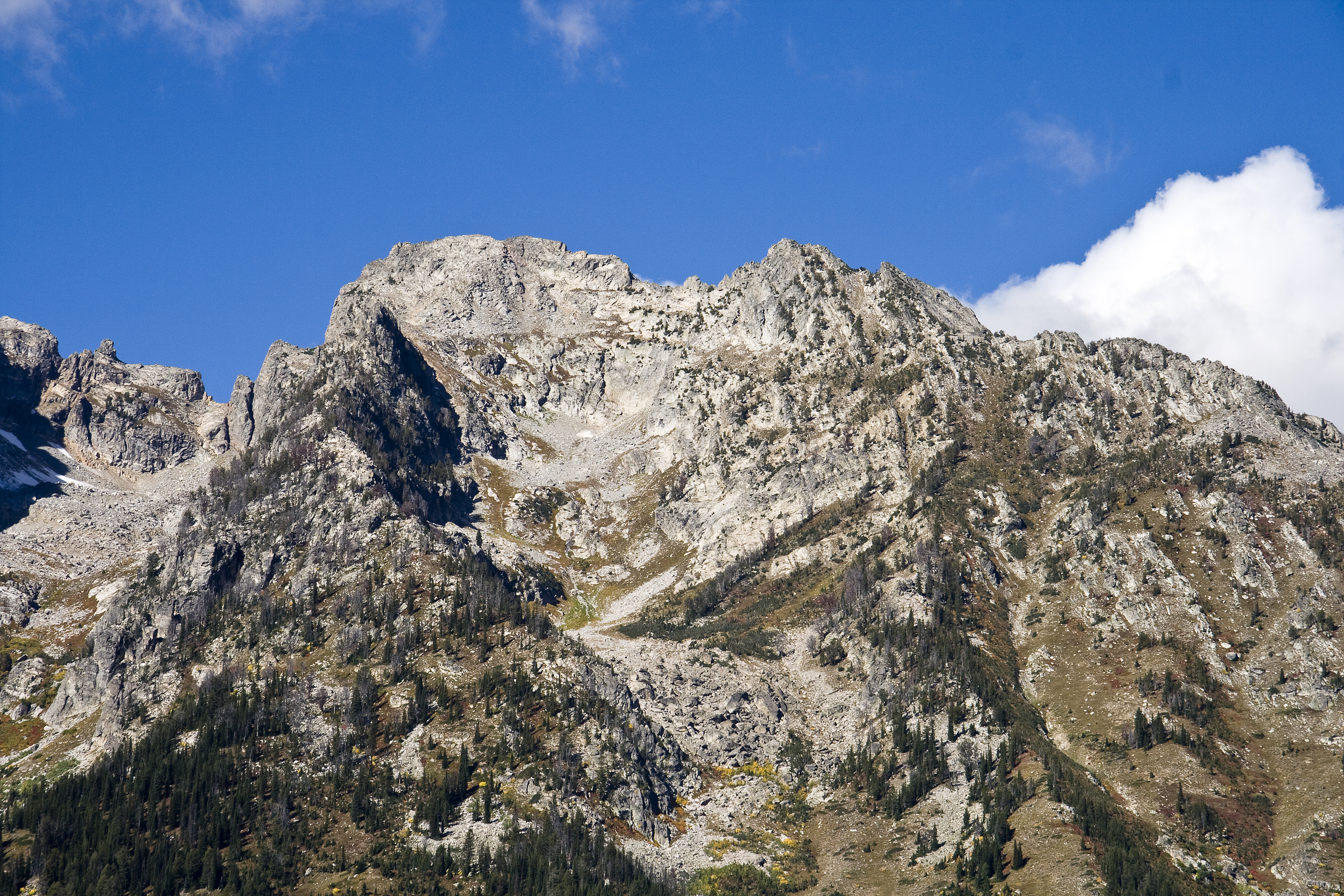
- Rockchuck Peak

Highest point
- Elevation: 11,149 ft (3,398 m)
- Prominence: 704 ft (215 m)
- Coordinates: 43°47′18″N 110°46′04″W

Geography
- Location within Wyoming Location within the United States
- Location: Grand Teton National Park, Teton County, Wyoming, U.S.
- Parent range: Teton Range
- Topo map: USGS Mount Moran

Climbing
- First ascent: Fryxell 1930
- Easiest route: Scramble

Rockchuck Peak (11,149 feet (3,398 m)) is located in the Teton Range, Grand Teton National Park in the U.S. state of Wyoming. The mountain is immediately west of String Lake and south of Paintbrush Canyon. The summit is .5 miles (0.80 km) north of Mount Saint John.

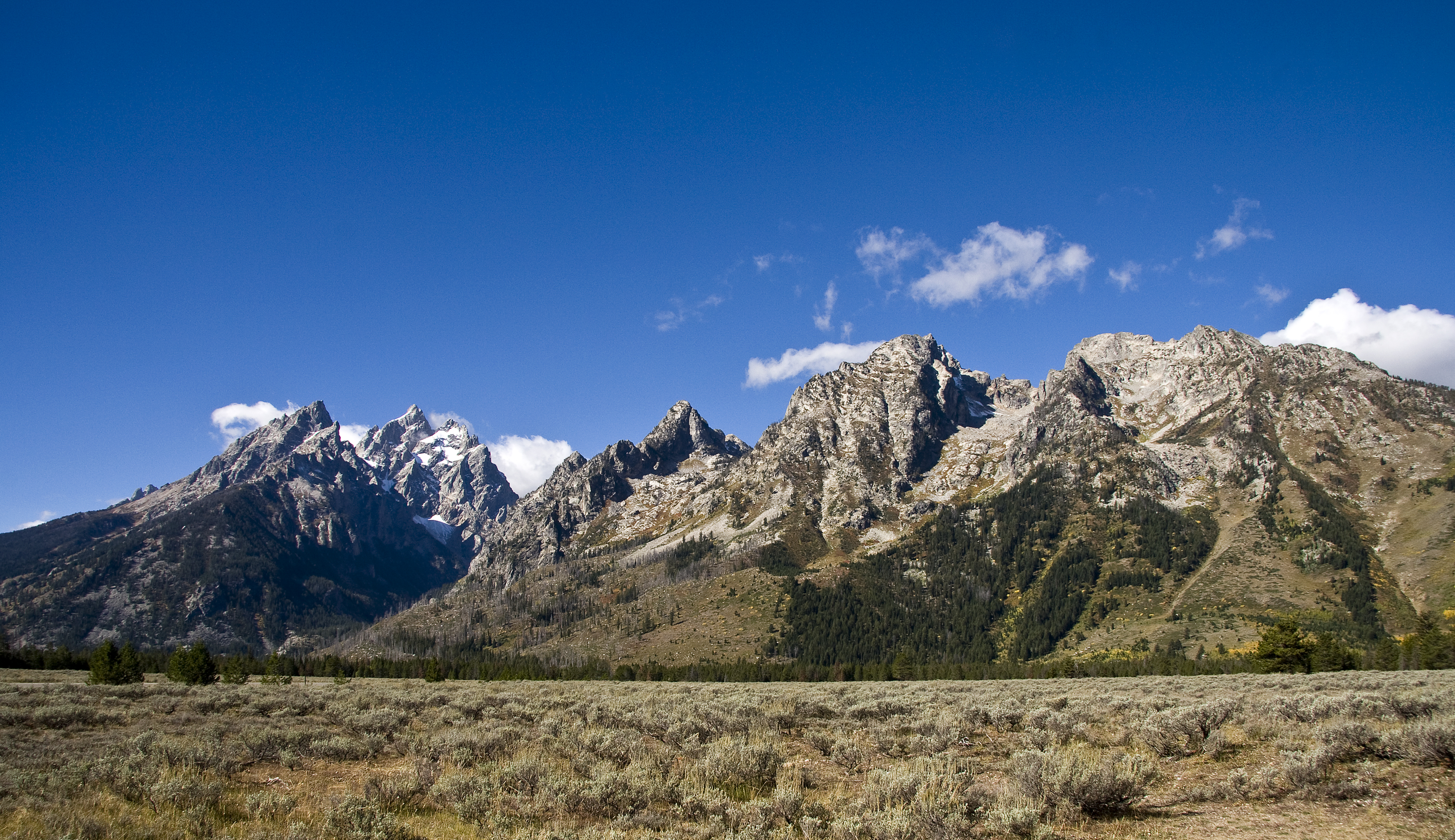
Teton Range left to right with the Cathedral Group, Cascade Canyon, Symmetry Spire, Mount Saint John and Rockchuck Peak
