= Terrence Leas =

American academic and university administrator

Terry Leas

President of Big Bend Community College
- In office 2012–2020
- Preceded by: William Bonaudi
- Succeeded by: Sara Thompson Tweedy

Personal details
- Born: 1950 (age 75–76)
- Spouse: Loyal Leas
- Children: 2
- Education: Florida State University; Valdosta State College
- Profession: Academic Administration

Terrence Leas (born 1950) is a retired American academic. Leas most recently served as president of Big Bend Community College in Moses Lake, Washington from 2012 to 2020. Leas is an advocate of "asynchroncity", an approach to education that "dismisses the longstanding model of teachers lecturing in a fixed place and time while students listen".

== Education ==
Leas received his undergraduate education from Florida State University (FSU), where he earned a bachelor's degree (B.A.) in social science education in 1972. Leas has spoken about his negative experience registering for classes on his first day at FSU, which he credits with inspiring him to reform the education system:

"We got a pack of IBM cards and lined up in the gym for registration... I saw a girl sitting under the table, crying, and within an hour, I felt the same."

Leas went on to receive his master's degree in educational administration from Valdosta State College (now Valdosta State University) in 1981. Leas would return to FSU to receive his doctorate in higher education administration in 1989.

== Career ==
Leas began his career as a middle school science teacher. A member of the Education Law Association since 1989, Dr. Leas has served on its board and as its President in 2000. He earned ELA's Dissertation of the Year award in 1990 and received the M.A. McGhehey award in 2010. As an academic, Leas notably contributed to 'A Legal History of Desegregation in Higher Education' (1994), which chronicled the desegregation of American colleges.

From 1990 to 2003, Leas served as a dean at Yakima Valley Community College in Yakima, Washington. He left this position in 2003 to become president of Riverland Community College in Minnesota. While at Riverland, Leas became a member of the American Association of Community Colleges' (AACC) Committee on Global Education in 2008. In 2012, Leas became the ninth president of Big Bend Community College, and would serve in this position until his retirement in 2020. Leas cited the need to care for his 97 year-old mother as a reason for his retirement

Leas is a noted advocate of "asynchroncity", an approach to education that "dismisses the longstanding model of teachers lecturing in a fixed place and time while students listen".

== Personal life ==
Leas is married to Loyal Leas, an English teacher. The pair have two daughters: Meredith & Amber.
