= David Stern (activist) =

American activist

David Stern was executive director of Equal Justice Works, a national nonprofit organization based in Washington, DC working to create a just society by mobilizing the next generation of lawyers committed to equal justice. He is former president of the Stern Family Fund, a private foundation that supported policy-oriented government and corporate accountability projects.

== Professional career ==
Stern graduated from Union College in 1982 and the Georgetown University Law Center in 1985. Following law school, he clerked for two federal judges in Baltimore and worked for a public interest law firm before joining Equal Justice Works, then known as the National Association of Public Interest Law (NAPIL). Hired in 1992 to create a postgraduate fellowship program for the organization, Stern became the executive director in 1995.

In the 23 years he has served as head of Equal Justice Works, the organization's annual budget grow more than fivefold from $2 million to $18 million, and the number of postgraduate fellowships has grown from 20 to more than 300 lawyers who are in the field. Today, Equal Justice Works manages the largest postgraduate fellowship program in the country. Nearly all of the American Bar Association-accredited law schools in the U.S. are members of Equal Justice Works.

In 2006, the Mississippi Center for Justice honored Stern for his leadership in bringing national attention to the legal needs of hurricane survivors and for creating the Katrina Initiative, an Equal Justice Works project that supported the work of 19 lawyers in the Gulf Coast. These attorneys were placed at organizations in Louisiana, Mississippi and Alabama to help the hundreds of thousands of people left without homes, jobs and social services due to the damage from the hurricanes. Stern describes the impact of the project in the 2007 short documentary, Survivors of the Storm. Stern was also recognized in May 2008 as one of the "Greatest Washington Lawyers of the Past 30 Years" by the Legal Times.

Stern has served on the boards of OpenSecrets and the Constitutional Accountability Center, and served on the Advisory Boards of the J. Skelly Wright Fellowship Committee at Yale Law School; the National Center for Medical-Legal Partnership and the New Voices Fellowship. Currently, he serves on the board of trustees for the Georgetown Day School.

Stern was recognized as a 'Champion of Change' by the White House in October 2011. The honor is in recognition of his dedication and commitment to closing the justice gap in America and ensure that all have equal access to justice.

Stern retired as executive director of Equal Justice Works in 2022, after 30 years of service.

== Stern Family Fund ==
The Sterns have supported reform efforts that attack the root causes of societal problems rather than simply attempting to alleviate the symptoms of these problems. As president of the Stern Family Fund — the foundation the family operated until 2007 — David Stern expanded the work of his father, philanthropist and author Philip Stern.

During his tenure as president, the Stern Family Foundation created the Public Interest Pioneer program that provided seed money to social entrepreneurs to launch new nonprofit organizations. Among the pioneers: Ami Dar, founder of Idealist.org; Greg LeRoy, founder of Good Jobs First; Sara Horowitz, founder of Working Today; and Joe Lovett, founder of the Appalachian Center for the Economy and the Environment.
