= LEE =

LEE may refer to:

- Law Enforcement Exploring
- Locus of Enterocyte Effacement, a pathogenicity island
- Lee railway station's National Rail station code
- Leesburg International Airport's IATA airport code
- Lee's Summit (Amtrak station)'s Amtrak station code
- Lake Erie and Eastern Railroad's reporting mark, an Ohio railroad

== See also ==
- Lee (disambiguation)
