= Judge Lee =

Judge Lee may refer to:

- Donald J. Lee (1927–2011), judge of the United States District Court for the Western District of Pennsylvania
- Elmo Pearce Lee (1882–1949), judge of the United States Court of Appeals for the Fifth Circuit
- Eumi K. Lee (born 1972), judge of the United States District Court for the Northern District of California
- Eunice C. Lee (born 1970), judge of the United States Court of Appeals for the Second Circuit
- Gerald Bruce Lee (born 1952), judge of the United States District Court for the Eastern District of Virginia
- John Z. Lee (born 1968), judge of the United States Court of Appeals for the Seventh Circuit
- Kenneth K. Lee (born 1975), judge of the United States Court of Appeals for the Ninth Circuit
- Thomas Lee (South Carolina judge) (1769–1839), judge of the United States District Court for the District of South Carolina
- Tom Stewart Lee (born 1941), judge of the United States District Court for the Southern District of Mississippi
- William Charles Lee (1938–2024), judge of the United States District Court for the Northern District of Indiana

== See also ==
- Justice Lee (disambiguation)
