= Equal Justice Works =

U.S. non-profit organization

Equal Justice Works is a Washington, D.C.–based nonprofit organization that focuses on careers in public service for lawyers. Equal Justice Works' stated mission is "to create a just society by mobilizing the next generation of lawyers committed to equal justice."

== Programs ==
Founded in 1986 as the National Association for Public Interest Law (NAPIL), the organization works with law schools, law firms, corporate legal departments and nonprofit organizations to provide the training and skills that enable attorneys to provide legal assistance to the poor and other vulnerable populations.

Research has shown that early public interest experience for law students and new lawyers leads to a lifelong commitment to justice, but that debt keeps many law graduates from taking public interest jobs. Equal Justice Works has contributed to the research and advocacy of loan repayment assistance programs and the College Cost Reduction And Access Act of 2007.

One hundred ninety-five law schools (including 189 of the country's 196 American Bar Association-accredited law schools) are members of Equal Justice Works and participate in programs to develop public interest training and opportunities.

"Equal Justice Works Fellowships" is the largest postgraduate legal fellowship program in the United States. The projects proposed by the Fellows are varied and tend to reflect unresolved social and legal issues including immigration, health care and civil liberties.

== Activities ==
The organization publishes The E-Guide to Public Service at America's Law Schools, an online resource of public service opportunities, curricula, and financial-aid programs. Equal Justice Works also hosts an annual Conference and Career Fair for employers, job seekers and law school professionals.

Through "Summer Corps"—a partnership between Equal Justice Works and AmeriCorps—350 law students serve at nonprofit legal aid organizations every summer.

== Leadership ==
Equal Justice Works is governed by a board of directors made up of about 30 law firm partners, corporate counsel, legal educators, and executives from legal services agencies. The CEO is Verna L. Williams.

From 1995 to 2022, David Stern was Executive Director. During this period Equal Justice Works’ budget grew from under $2 million to over $21 million, to support more than 200 positions in the postgraduate fellowship program.

== See also ==
- Education Law Association
