= Prime Minister Lee =

Prime Minister Lee may refer to:

- Lee Kuan Yew (1923–2015), 1st prime minister of Singapore
- Lee Hsien Loong (born 1952), 3rd prime minister of Singapore and son of the 1st prime minister
- Prime ministers of South Korea, such as:
  - Lee Han-key, acting
  - Lee Hyun-jae (born 1929)
  - Lee Hoi-chang (born 1935)
  - Lee Yung-dug (1926–2010)
  - Lee Hong-koo (born 1934)
  - Lee Soo-sung (born 1939)
  - Lee Han-dong (1934–2021)
  - Lee Hae-chan (born 1952)
  - Lee Wan-koo (born 1950)

== See also ==
- Lee (name)
- Lee Huan (1917–2010), premier of the Republic of China
- Premier Li (disambiguation)
- President Lee (disambiguation)
