= Lee, Uttarakhand =

Village located in India

Lee, Uttarakhand Lee
- Village
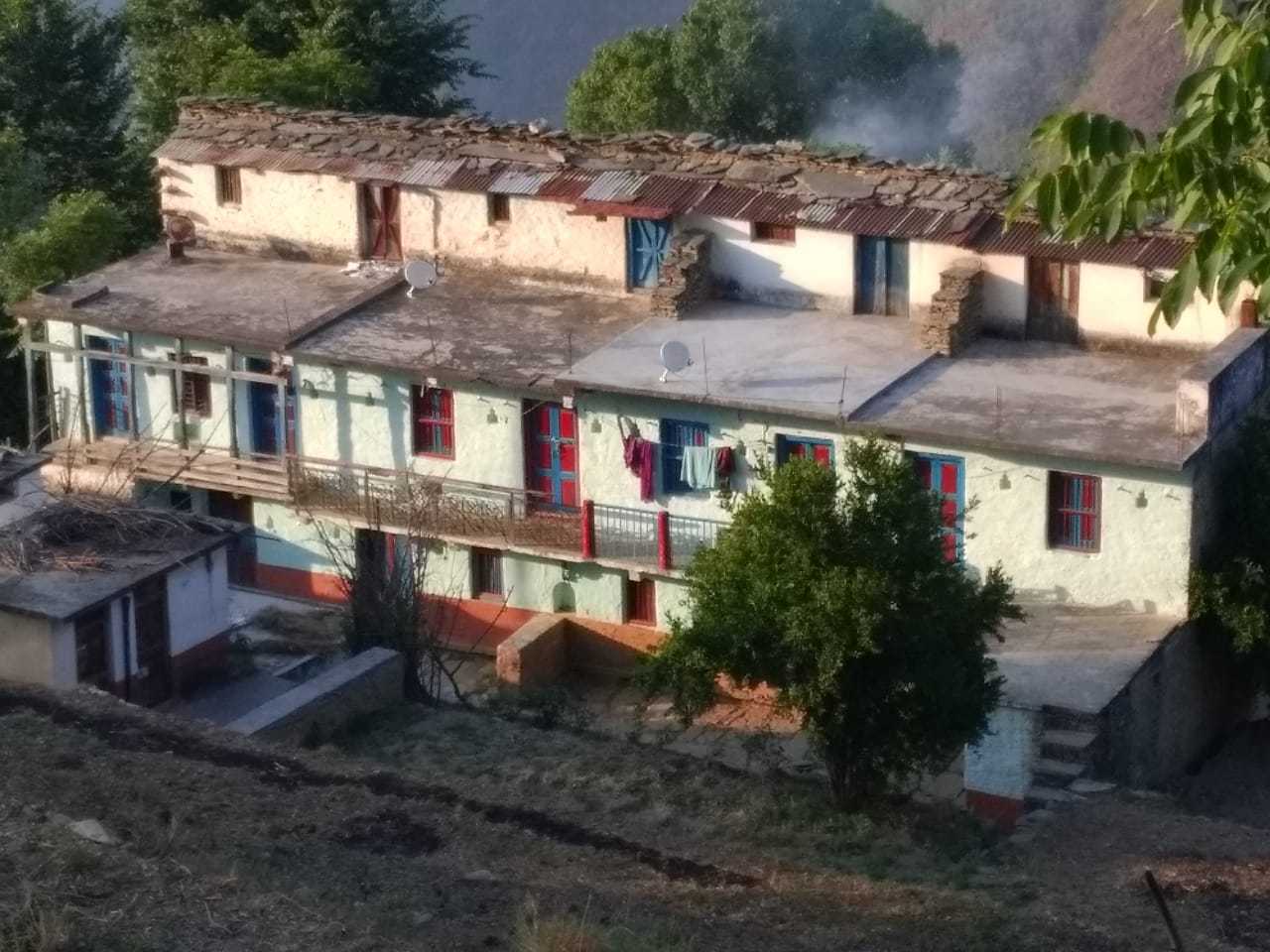
- Houses in Lee, India
- Country: india
- States: Uttarakhand
- Districts: Pauri Garhwal

Population
  - Total: 148

Lee is a small village located in Pauri Tehsil of the Pauri Garhwal district. Uttarakhand, India.

== Demographics ==
Demographics (as of 2011)
Particulars	Total	Men	Women
Total No. of Houses	33	-	-
Population	148	74	74
Child (0-6)	27	19	8
Schedule Caste	0	0	0
Schedule Tribe	0	0	0
Literacy	79.34 %	98.18 %	63.64 %
Total Workers	73	26	47
Main Worker	57	0	0
Marginal Worker	16	5	11
Families	33	-	-
Average Sex Ratio	1000	-	-
Child Sex Ratio	421	-	-

=== Additional Information ===
As of the 2011 census of India, Lee had a population of 148 people in 33 families.

The average Sex Ratio of Lee is 1000, which is higher than Uttarakhand's state average of 963. While the Child Sex Ratio of Lee as per census is 421, lower than Uttarakhand's state average of 890.

== Leadership ==
=== Constituency ===
Lee falls under the Pauri Garhwal Assembly and Parliament Constituency.

=== Type of Leadership ===
Lee falls under the Panchayati Raaj Act, which means the village of Lee falls under the administration of the Sarpanch (Head of Village), which is elected by the people of Lee with voting rights every 5 years.

== Other ==
The village's postal and the Subscriber Trunk Dialing code is:

(Pin Code: 246001, STD Code: 01368)
