= Lee =

Lee may refer to:

== Arts and entertainment ==
- Lee (2007 film), Tamil-language sports action film
- Lee (2017 film), Kannada-language action film
- Lee (2023 film), biographical drama about Lee Miller, American photojournalist
- Lee (novel), by Tito Perdue, about an angry and well-read septuagenarian
- "Lee", a 1973 single by The Detroit Emeralds
- "Lee", a 2001 song by Tenacious D from their eponymous album

== Businesses ==
=== Finance ===
- Thomas H. Lee Partners, an American private equity firm founded in 1974
  - Lee Equity Partners, a breakaway firm founded in 2006

=== Manufacturers ===
- Lee Tires, a division of Goodyear
- Lee Filters, a maker of lighting filters

=== Other businesses ===
- Lee (brand), an American clothing brand
- Lee Enterprises, an American media company (NYSE: LEE)
- Lee Data, a defunct American computer company

== Education ==
- Lee College, Bayton, Texas, United States
- Lee University, Cleveland, Tennessee, US

== Meteorology ==
- List of storms named Lee
- Lee wave, atmospheric oscillations as the wind moves over mountains
- Lee side, the side of a ship, boat, or island that is not exposed to the wind

== Names ==
=== Given name ===
- Lee (given name), a given name in English

=== Surname ===
- Chinese surnames romanized as Li or Lee:
  - Li (surname 李) or Lee (Hanzi 李), a common Chinese surname
  - Li (surname 利) or Lee (Hanzi 利), a Chinese surname
- Lý (Vietnamese surname) or Lí (李), a common Vietnamese surname
- Lee (Korean surname) or Rhee or Yi (Hanja 李, Hangul 리 or 이), a common Korean surname
- Lee (English surname), a common English surname
- Lists of people with surname Lee:
  - List of people with surname Li
  - List of people with the Korean family name Lee

== Places ==
=== United Kingdom ===
- Lee, Devon
- Lee, Hampshire
- Lee, London
- Lee, Mull, a location in Argyll and Bute
- Lee, Northumberland, a location
- Lee, Shropshire, a location
- Lee-on-the-Solent, Hampshire
- Lee-over-Sands, Essex
- Lee District (Metropolis)
- The Lee, Buckinghamshire, parish and village name, formally known as Lee
- River Lee — alternative name for River Lea

=== United States ===
- Lee, California
- Lee, Florida
- Lee, Illinois
- Lee, Indiana
- Lee, Maine
- Lee, Massachusetts, a New England town
  - Lee (CDP), Massachusetts, the central village in the town
- Lee, Nevada
- Lee, New Hampshire
- Lee, New York, a town
  - Lee (hamlet), New York, within the town of Lee
- Lees Station, Tennessee, also called Lee
- Lee Peak, in Missouri
- Mount Lee, in California
- Van Aken–Lee (RTA Rapid Transit station) (signed "Lee – Van Aken"), a station on the RTA Blue Line in Cleveland, Ohio

=== Elsewhere ===
- Lée, southwestern France
- Lee, Uttarakhand, India
- Electoral district of Lee, in South Australia
- River Lee, in Ireland
- Lee (Vechte), a river in Germany

== Vehicles ==
- Lee side, a ship or boat's downwind side
- M3 Lee, an American WWII tank

== See also ==
- LEA (disambiguation)
- Leah (disambiguation)
- Le (disambiguation)
- LEE (disambiguation)
- Lees (disambiguation)
- Lee's (disambiguation)
- Leigh (disambiguation)
- Li (disambiguation)
- Ly (disambiguation)
- Justice Lee (disambiguation)
