= Less is more (disambiguation) =

Less is more is a principle in design and architecture.

Less is more may also refer to:

- Less-is-more paradox, a voting pathology where a candidate loses as a result of having too many votes
- "Less is more", an ancient Greek proverb attributed to Chilon of Sparta
- "Less is more", a line from the 1855 poem "Andrea del Sarto" by Robert Browning
- Less is more (architecture), a motto adopted by Ludwig Mies van der Rohe

== Music ==
- Less Is More Tour, a 2011 concert tour by Natasha Bedingfield

=== Albums ===
- Less Is More (Marillion album), 2009
- Less Is More (Lost Frequencies album), 2016
- Les Is More, a 2012 album by Ryan Leslie

=== Songs ===
- "Less Is More", a song by Relient K from the 2001 album The Anatomy of the Tongue in Cheek
- "Less Is More", a song by Joss Stone from the 2001 album Mind Body & Soul
- "Less Is More", a song by MacKenzie Porter from the 2024 album Nobody's Born with a Broken Heart

== Television ==
- "Less Is More" (The L Word: Generation Q), a television episode
- "Less Is More (Roseanne)", a television episode

== See also ==
- More-is-less paradox
