= LEZ =

LEZ or lez may refer to:

== Places ==
=== In France ===
- Lez, Haute-Garonne, a former commune in the Haute-Garonne department in France
- Lez (river), a river in the Hérault department in France, discharging into the Mediterranean Sea
- Lez (Rhône), a river in the Drôme and Vaucluse departments in France, tributary of the Rhône
- Lez (Salat), a river in the Ariège department in France, tributary of the Salat

=== Other ===
- Low emission zone
  - London low emission zone
- La Esperanza Airport (Intibucá), IATA code for the airport in Honduras

== Other uses ==
- Lima Enerzone Corporation
- Slang for lesbian (sometimes derogatory, more commonly les)
- Lez Duly, former member of punk band Concrete Sox
- ISO 639 code for Lezgian language

== See also ==
- Lèze, a river in the Ariège and Haute-Garonne departments in southwestern France
- ULEZ
