= Justice Lee =

Justice Lee may refer to:

- Dan M. Lee (1926–2010), associate justice of the Supreme Court of Mississippi
- George Hay Lee (1807–1873), associate justice of the Virginia Court of Appeals
- Percy Mercer Lee (c. 1893–1969), justice and chief justice of the Supreme Court of Mississippi
- Roy Noble Lee (1915–2015), chief justice of the Supreme Court of Mississippi
- Sharon G. Lee (born 1953), associate justice of the Tennessee Supreme Court
- T. Bailey Lee (1873−1948), associate justice of the Idaho Supreme Court
- Thomas Rex Lee (born 1964), associate justice of the Utah Supreme Court
- William Lee (English judge) (1688–1754), Lord Chief Justice of the King's Bench
- William A. Lee (judge) (1859–1926), associate justice of the Idaho Supreme Court
- William E. Lee (Idaho) (1882–1955), associate justice of the Idaho Supreme Court
- William Little Lee (1821–1857), first chief justice of the Supreme Court for the Kingdom of Hawaii

== See also ==
- Judge Lee (disambiguation)
- Justice Lea (disambiguation)
