= Justice Lea =

Justice Lea may refer to:

- Benjamin J. Lea (1833–1894), associate justice of the Tennessee Supreme Court
- James Neilson Lea (1815–1884), associate justice of the Louisiana Supreme Court

== See also ==
- Justice Lee (disambiguation)
