= Lais (disambiguation) =

Lais is a feminine given name.

Lais or Laïs may also refer to:

== Places ==
- Lais, Indonesia, a district in the Musi Banyuasin Regency in South Sumatra Province, Indonesia
- Lais River in Arjeplog Municipality, Sweden
- Lais (barony), a former barony and castle near Tartu, Estonia
- Dan (biblical city), Latin name for Laish, an earlier Biblical name for the city of Dan

== Other ==
- Laïs (band), a musical group
- Plural for Lai (poetic form)
- Breton lais, a form of British medieval romance literature
  - Lais of Marie de France
- Genus of flowering plants, now considered to be Hippeastrum
- Plural for LAI, an acronym for long-acting injectable medication
