= Sheila Lea =

British artist

- Born: Sheila Maclagan; 16 March 1901; London
- Died: 1992 (aged 90–91); Bournemouth
- Education: Bournemouth College of Art; Regent Street Polytechnic
- Known for: Sculpture
- Spouse(s): Cyril Lea, m.1931

Sheila Lea (née Maclagan; 16 March 1901 – 1992) was a British sculptor.

== Biography ==
Lea was born in London to a Scottish father, Norman Maclagan, and his wife, Olive, who was from Cornwall. Lea spent part of her childhood at Bruton in Somerset before attending the Bournemouth College of Art where she was taught by the sculptor Joseph Hermon Cawthra. After moving to London to study at the Regent Street Polytechnic School of Art, Lea returned to Bournemouth where she lived for the rest of her life. From there she produced statuettes and sculpture groups in both bronze and plaster and was particularly noted for her portrait work. From 1946 to 1983 Lea was a regular exhibitor at Royal Academy group shows in London. She also had pieces shown at the Paris Salon, with the Society of Women Artists and with the Bournemouth Arts' Club of which she was a member. The Russell-Cotes Art Gallery & Museum has examples of her work.
