= Lee (Vechte) =

River in Lower Saxony, Germany

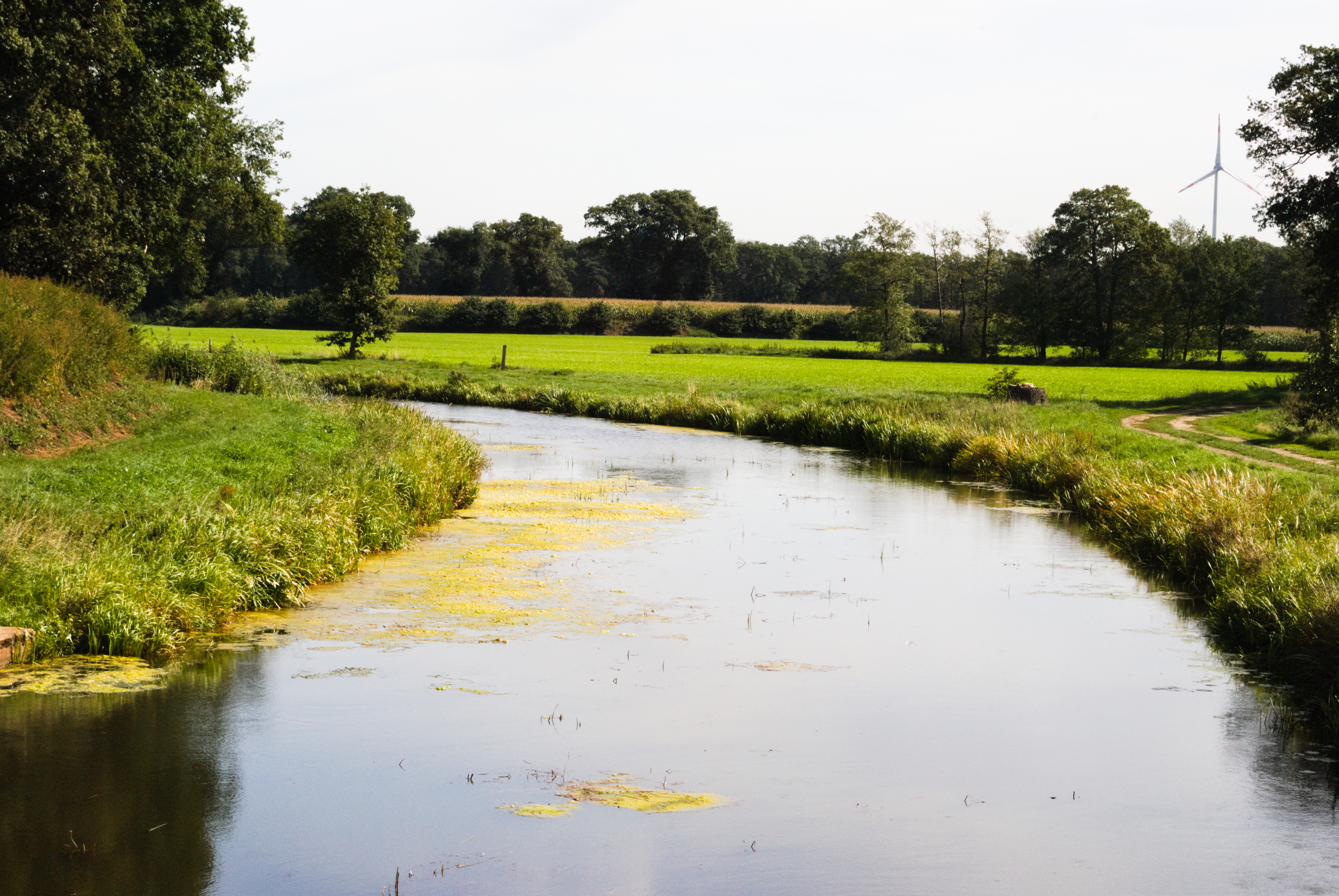

Location
- Country: Germany
- State: Lower Saxony

Physical characteristics
- Mouth
  - location: Vechte
  - coordinates: 52.5628°N 6.9487°E
- Length: 22.3 km (13.9 mi)

Basin features
- Progression: Vechte→ Zwarte Water→ IJsselmeer

Lee is a river of Lower Saxony, Germany. It flows into the Vechte near Hoogstede.

== See also ==
- List of rivers of Lower Saxony
