= Luke Lea =

Luke Lea may refer to:

- Luke Lea (American politician, born 1783), U.S. Representative from Tennessee, 1833–1837
- Luke Lea (American politician, born 1810), Mississippi gubernatorial candidate in 1849, Commissioner of Indian Affairs, U.S. Attorney in Mississippi
- Luke Lea (American politician, born 1879), U.S. Senator from Tennessee, 1911–1917; founder of The Tennessean newspaper
