= Leburnick =

Hamlet in Cornwall, England

Coordinates: 50.6099°N 4.3319°W

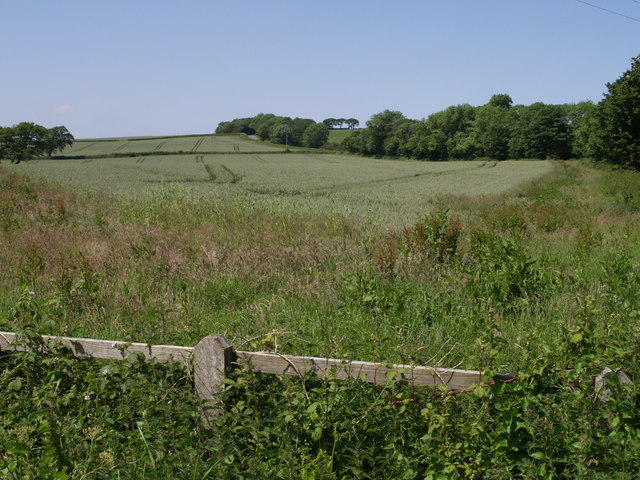
- A field next to Leburnick Cross

- Location within Cornwall
- OS grid reference: SX351815
- Civil parish: Lawhitton
- Unitary authority: Cornwall
- Ceremonial county: Cornwall
- Region: South West
- Country: England
- Sovereign state: United Kingdom
- Post town: Launceston
- Postcode district: PL15 9

Leburnick is a hamlet near Lawhitton (where the 2011 population is included) in Cornwall, England.
