= LEA (cipher) =

Republic of Korea national standard block cipher

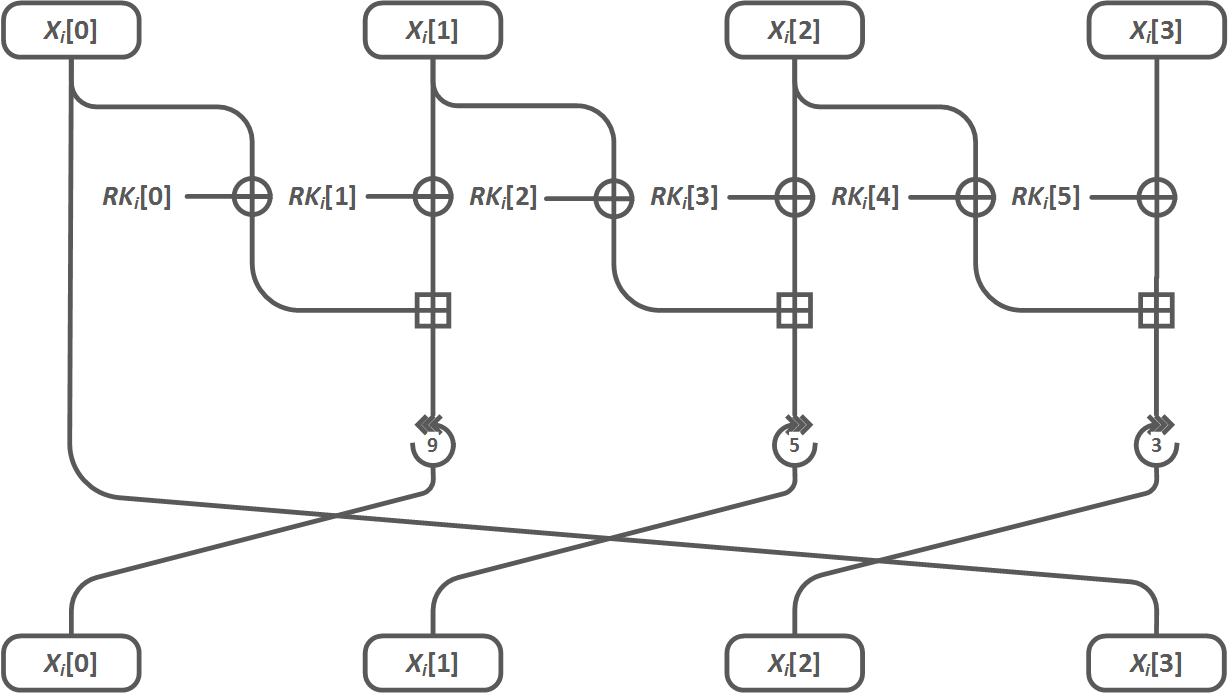
- LEA encryption round function

General
- Designers: Deukjo Hong, Jung-Keun Lee, Dong-Chan Kim, Daesung Kwon, Kwon Ho Ryu, Dong-Geon Lee
- First published: 2013

Cipher detail
- Key sizes: 128, 192, or 256 bits
- Block sizes: 128 bits
- Structure: ARX (modular Addition, bitwise Rotation, and bitwise XOR)
- Rounds: 24, 28, or 32 (depending on key size)

Best public cryptanalysis
- As of 2019, no successful attack on full-round LEA is known.

The Lightweight Encryption Algorithm (also known as LEA) is a 128-bit block cipher developed by South Korea in 2013 to provide confidentiality in high-speed environments such as big data and cloud computing, as well as lightweight environments such as IoT devices and mobile devices. LEA has three different key lengths: 128, 192, and 256 bits. LEA encrypts data about 1.5 to 2 times faster than AES, the most widely used block cipher in various software environments.

LEA is one of the cryptographic algorithms approved by the Korean Cryptographic Module Validation Program (KCMVP) and is the national standard of Republic of Korea (KS X 3246). LEA is included in the ISO/IEC 29192-2:2019 standard (Information security - Lightweight cryptography - Part 2: Block ciphers).

== Specification ==
The block cipher LEA consisting of ARX operations (modular Addition: $\boxplus$, bitwise Rotation: $\lll$, $\ggg$, and bitwise XOR $\oplus$) for 32-bit words processes data blocks of 128 bits and has three different key lengths: 128, 192, and 256 bits. LEA with a 128-bit key, LEA with a 192-bit key, and LEA with a 256-bit key are referred to as “LEA-128”, “LEA-192”, and “LEA-256”, respectively. The number of rounds is 24 for LEA-128, 28 for LEA-192, and 32 for LEA-256.

=== Encryption ===
Let $P = P[0] \| P[1] \| P[2] \| P[3]$ be a 128-bit block of plaintext and $C = C[0] \| C[1] \| C[2] \| C[3]$ be a 128-bit block of ciphertext, where $P[i]$ and $C[i]$ ($0 \le i < 4$) are 32-bit blocks. Let $K_{i} = K_{i}[0] \| K_{i}[1] \| K_{i}[2] \| K_{i}[3] \| K_{i}[4] \| K_{i}[5]$ ($0 \le i < Nr$) be 192-bit round keys, where $K_{i}[j]$ ($0 \le j < 6$) are 32-bit blocks. Here $Nr$ is the number of rounds for the LEA algorithm. The encryption operation is described as follows:

1. $X_{0}[0] \| X_{0}[1] \| X_{0}[2] \| X_{0}[3] \leftarrow P[0] \| P[1] \| P[2] \| P[3]$
2. for $i=0$ to $Nr - 1$
  1. $X_{i+1}[0] \leftarrow \left( \left( X_{i}[0] \oplus K_{i}[0] \right) \boxplus \left( X_{i}[1] \oplus K_{i}[1] \right) \right) \lll 9$
  2. $X_{i+1}[1] \leftarrow \left( \left( X_{i}[1] \oplus K_{i}[2] \right) \boxplus \left( X_{i}[2] \oplus K_{i}[3] \right) \right) \ggg 5$
  3. $X_{i+1}[2] \leftarrow \left( \left( X_{i}[2] \oplus K_{i}[4] \right) \boxplus \left( X_{i}[3] \oplus K_{i}[5] \right) \right) \ggg 3$
  4. $X_{i+1}[3] \leftarrow X_{i}[0]$
3. $C[0] \| C[1] \| C[2] \| C[3] \leftarrow X_{Nr}[0] \| X_{Nr}[1] \| X_{Nr}[2] \| X_{Nr}[3]$

=== Decryption ===
The decryption operation is as follows:

1. $X_{Nr}[0] \| X_{Nr}[1] \| X_{Nr}[2] \| X_{Nr}[3] \leftarrow C[0] \| C[1] \| C[2] \| C[3]$
2. for $i=(Nr-1)$ down to $0$
  1. $X_{i}[0] \leftarrow X_{i+1}[3]$
  2. $X_{i}[1] \leftarrow \left( \left( X_{i+1}[0] \ggg 9 \right) \boxminus \left( X_{i}[0] \oplus K_{i}[0] \right) \right) \oplus K_{i}[1]$
  3. $X_{i}[2] \leftarrow \left( \left( X_{i+1}[1] \lll 5 \right) \boxminus \left( X_{i}[1] \oplus K_{i}[2] \right) \right) \oplus K_{i}[3]$
  4. $X_{i}[3] \leftarrow \left( \left( X_{i+1}[2] \lll 3 \right) \boxminus \left( X_{i}[2] \oplus K_{i}[4] \right) \right) \oplus K_{i}[5]$
3. $P[0] \| P[1] \| P[2] \| P[3] \leftarrow X_{0}[0] \| X_{0}[1] \| X_{0}[2] \| X_{0}[3]$

=== Key schedule ===
The key schedule of LEA supports 128, 192, and 256-bit keys and outputs 192-bit round keys $K_{i}$ ($0 \le i < Nr$) for the data processing part.

==== Key schedule for LEA-128 ====
Let $K = K[0] \| K[1] \| K[2] \| K[3]$ be a 128-bit key, where $K[i]$ ($0 \le i < 4$) are 32-bit blocks. The key schedule for LEA-128 takes $K$ and four 32-bit constants $\delta[i]$ ($0 \le i < 4$) as inputs and outputs twenty-four 192-bit round keys $K_{i}$ ($0 \le i < 24$). The key schedule operation for LEA-128 is as follows:

1. $T[0] \| T[1] \| T[2] \| T[3] \leftarrow K[0] \| K[1] \| K[2] \| K[3]$
2. for $i=0$ to $23$
  1. $T[0] \leftarrow \left( T[0] \boxplus \left( \delta[i \mod 4] \lll i \right) \right) \lll 1$
  2. $T[1] \leftarrow \left( T[1] \boxplus \left( \delta[i \mod 4] \lll \left( i + 1 \right) \right) \right) \lll 3$
  3. $T[2] \leftarrow \left( T[2] \boxplus \left( \delta[i \mod 4] \lll \left( i + 2 \right) \right) \right) \lll 6$
  4. $T[3] \leftarrow \left( T[3] \boxplus \left( \delta[i \mod 4] \lll \left( i + 3 \right) \right) \right) \lll 11$
  5. $K_{i} \leftarrow T[0] \| T[1] \| T[2] \| T[1] \| T[3] \| T[1]$

==== Key schedule for LEA-192 ====
Let $K = K[0] \| K[1] \| K[2] \| K[3] \| K[4] \| K[5]$ be a 192-bit key, where $K[i]$ ($0 \le i < 6$) are 32-bit blocks. The key schedule for LEA-192 takes $K$ and six 32-bit constants $\delta[i]$ ($0 \le i < 6$) as inputs and outputs twenty-eight 192-bit round keys $K_{i}$ ($0 \le i < 28$). The key schedule operation for LEA-192 is as follows:

1. $T[0] \| T[1] \| T[2] \| T[3] \| T[4] \| T[5] \leftarrow K[0] \| K[1] \| K[2] \| K[3] \| K[4] \| K[5]$
2. for $i=0$ to $27$
  1. $T[0] \leftarrow \left( T[0] \boxplus \left( \delta[i \mod 6] \lll i \right) \right) \lll 1$
  2. $T[1] \leftarrow \left( T[1] \boxplus \left( \delta[i \mod 6] \lll \left( i + 1 \right) \right) \right) \lll 3$
  3. $T[2] \leftarrow \left( T[2] \boxplus \left( \delta[i \mod 6] \lll \left( i + 2 \right) \right) \right) \lll 6$
  4. $T[3] \leftarrow \left( T[3] \boxplus \left( \delta[i \mod 6] \lll \left( i + 3 \right) \right) \right) \lll 11$
  5. $T[4] \leftarrow \left( T[4] \boxplus \left( \delta[i \mod 6] \lll \left( i + 4 \right) \right) \right) \lll 13$
  6. $T[5] \leftarrow \left( T[5] \boxplus \left( \delta[i \mod 6] \lll \left( i + 5 \right) \right) \right) \lll 17$
  7. $K_{i} \leftarrow T[0] \| T[1] \| T[2] \| T[3] \| T[4] \| T[5]$

==== Key schedule for LEA-256 ====
Let $K = K[0] \| K[1] \| K[2] \| K[3] \| K[4] \| K[5] \| K[6] \| K[7]$ be a 256-bit key, where $K[i]$ ($0 \le i < 8$) are 32-bit blocks. The key schedule for LEA-192 takes $K$ and eight 32-bit constants $\delta[i]$ ($0 \le i < 8$) as inputs and outputs thirty-two 192-bit round keys $K_{i}$ ($0 \le i < 32$). The key schedule operation for LEA-256 is as follows:

1. $T[0] \| T[1] \| T[2] \| T[3] \| T[4] \| T[5] \| T[6] \| T[7] \leftarrow K[0] \| K[1] \| K[2] \| K[3] \| K[4] \| K[5] \| K[6] \| K[7]$
2. for $i=0$ to $31$
  1. $T[6i \mod 8] \leftarrow \left( T[6i \mod 8] \boxplus \left( \delta[i \mod 8] \lll i \right) \right) \lll 1$
  2. $T[6i + 1 \mod 8] \leftarrow \left( T[6i + 1 \mod 8] \boxplus \left( \delta[i \mod 8] \lll \left( i + 1 \right) \right) \right) \lll 3$
  3. $T[6i + 2 \mod 8] \leftarrow \left( T[6i + 2 \mod 8] \boxplus \left( \delta[i \mod 8] \lll \left( i + 2 \right) \right) \right) \lll 6$
  4. $T[6i + 3 \mod 8] \leftarrow \left( T[6i + 3 \mod 8] \boxplus \left( \delta[i \mod 8] \lll \left( i + 3 \right) \right) \right) \lll 11$
  5. $T[6i + 4 \mod 8] \leftarrow \left( T[6i + 4 \mod 8] \boxplus \left( \delta[i \mod 8] \lll \left( i + 4 \right) \right) \right) \lll 13$
  6. $T[6i + 5 \mod 8] \leftarrow \left( T[6i + 5 \mod 8] \boxplus \left( \delta[i \mod 8] \lll \left( i + 5 \right) \right) \right) \lll 17$
  7. $K_{i} \leftarrow T[6i \mod 8] \| T[6i + 1 \mod 8] \| T[6i + 2 \mod 8] \| T[6i + 3 \mod 8] \| T[6i + 4 \mod 8] \| T[6i + 5 \mod 8]$

==== Constant values ====
The eight 32-bit constant values $\delta[i]$ ($0 \le i < 8$) used in the key schedule are given in the following table.

Constant values used in the key schedule
$i$	0	1	2	3	4	5	6	7
$\delta[i]$	0xc3efe9db	0x44626b02	0x79e27c8a	0x78df30ec	0x715ea49e	0xc785da0a	0xe04ef22a	0xe5c40957

== Security ==
As of 2019, no successful attack on full-round LEA is known. As is typical for iterated block ciphers, reduced-round variants have been attacked. The best published attacks on LEA in the standard attack model (CPA/CCA with unknown key) are boomerang attacks and differential linear attacks. The security margin to the whole rounds ratio is greater than 37% against various existing cryptanalytic techniques for block ciphers.

Security of LEA-128 (24 rounds)
Attack type	Attacked rounds
Differential	14
Truncated differential	14
Linear	13
Zero correlation	10
Boomerang	15
Impossible differential	12
Integral	9
Differential linear	15
Related-key differential	13

Security margins of LEA
Block ciphers	Rounds (Attacked / Total)	Security margins
LEA-128	15 / 24	37.50%
LEA-192	16 / 28	42.85%
LEA-256	18 / 32	43.75%

== Performance ==
LEA has very good performance in a general-purpose software environment. In particular, it is possible to encrypt at a rate of about 1.5 to 2 times on average, compared to AES, the most widely used block cipher in various software environments. The tables below compare the performance of LEA and AES using FELICS (Fair Evaluation of Lightweight Cryptographic Systems), a benchmarking framework for evaluation of software implementations of lightweight cryptographic primitives.

FELICS scenario 1 – Enc. + Dec. + KeySetup / 128-byte CBC-Encryption (Code: bytes, RAM: bytes, Time: cycles)
Platform		LEA-128	LEA-192	LEA-256	AES-128
AVR	Code	1,684	2,010	2,150	3,010
AVR	RAM	631	943	1,055	408
AVR	Time	61,020	80,954	92,194	58,248
MSP	Code	1,130	1,384	1,468	2,684
MSP	RAM	626	942	1,046	408
MSP	Time	47,339	56,540	64,001	86,506
ARM	Code	472	536	674	3,050
ARM	RAM	684	968	1,080	452
ARM	Time	17,417	20,640	24,293	83,868

FELICS scenario 2 – Enc. / 128-bit CTR-Encryption (Code: bytes, RAM: bytes, Time: cycles)
Platform		LEA-128	LEA-192	LEA-256	AES-128
AVR	Code	906	1,210	1,306	1,246
AVR	RAM	80	80	80	81
AVR	Time	4,023	4,630	5,214	3,408
MSP	Code	722	1,014	1,110	1,170
MSP	RAM	78	78	78	80
MSP	Time	2,814	3,242	3,622	4,497
ARM	Code	628	916	1,012	1,348
ARM	RAM	92	100	100	124
ARM	Time	906	1,108	1,210	4,044

== Test vectors ==
Test vectors for LEA for each key length are as follows. All values are expressed in hexadecimal form.

- LEA-128
  - Key: 0f 1e 2d 3c 4b 5a 69 78 87 96 a5 b4 c3 d2 e1 f0
  - Plaintext: 10 11 12 13 14 15 16 17 18 19 1a 1b 1c 1d 1e 1f
  - Ciphertext: 9f c8 4e 35 28 c6 c6 18 55 32 c7 a7 04 64 8b fd
- LEA-192
  - Key: 0f 1e 2d 3c 4b 5a 69 78 87 96 a5 b4 c3 d2 e1 f0 f0 e1 d2 c3 b4 a5 96 87
  - Plaintext: 20 21 22 23 24 25 26 27 28 29 2a 2b 2c 2d 2e 2f
  - Ciphertext: 6f b9 5e 32 5a ad 1b 87 8c dc f5 35 76 74 c6 f2
- LEA-256
  - Key: 0f 1e 2d 3c 4b 5a 69 78 87 96 a5 b4 c3 d2 e1 f0 f0 e1 d2 c3 b4 a5 96 87 78 69 5a 4b 3c 2d 1e 0f
  - Plaintext: 30 31 32 33 34 35 36 37 38 39 3a 3b 3c 3d 3e 3f
  - Ciphertext: d6 51 af f6 47 b1 89 c1 3a 89 00 ca 27 f9 e1 97

== Implementations ==
LEA is free for any use: public or private, commercial or non-commercial. The source code for distribution of LEA implemented in C, Java, and Python can be downloaded from KISA's website. In addition, LEA is contained in Crypto++ library, a free C++ class library of cryptographic schemes.

== KCMVP ==
LEA is one of the cryptographic algorithms approved by the Korean Cryptographic Module Validation Program (KCMVP).

== Standardization ==
LEA is included in the following standards.

- KS X 3246, 128-bit block cipher LEA (in Korean)
- ISO/IEC 29192-2:2019, Information security - Lightweight cryptography - Part 2: Block ciphers
