= Lay (surname) =

Lay is a surname. Notable people with the surname include:

- Alfred Morrison Lay (1836–1879), American politician
- Beirne Lay, Jr. (1909–1982), American author and World War II aviator
- Benjamin Lay (1681–1760), English Quaker and abolitionist
- Bob Lay (1944–2022), Australian sprinter
- Brandon Lay, American singer-songwriter
- Caren Lay (born 1972), German politician
- Carol Lay (born 1952), American author
- Cecil Howard Lay (1885–1956), English poet
- Charles Downing Lay (1877–1956), American landscape architect
- Donald P. Lay (1926–2007), American jurist
- Elzy Lay (1868–1934), U.S. outlaw
- George W. Lay (1798-1860), U.S. politician
- George Tradescant Lay (c. 1800–1845), British naturalist, missionary and diplomat
- Herman Lay (1909–1982), American businessman
- Horatio Nelson Lay (1832–1898), British diplomat
- Humberto Lay (born 25 September 1934), Peruvian evangelical pastor
- Jeffrey Lay (born 1969), Canadian rower
- John Louis Lay (1832–1899), American inventor
- Josh Lay (born 1982), American football player
- Kenneth Lay (1942–2006), U.S. businessman
- Ken Lay (police officer) (born 1956), Australian police commissioner
- Ko Lay (born 31 October 1931), Burmese politician
- Oliver Ingraham Lay (1845-1890), American portrait painter.
- Sam Lay (1935–2022), American drummer and vocalist
- Stan Lay (1906–2003), New Zealand track and field athlete
- Susan Lay (born March 13, 1985), English actress, musician, and TV presenter
