= Leckfurin =

Coordinates: 58.50243°N 4.21751°W

Leckfurin: Scottish Gaelic: Leac Bhioirn
- Location within the Sutherland area
- OS grid reference: NC708592
- Council area: Highland
- Lieutenancy area: Sutherland
- Country: Scotland
- Sovereign state: United Kingdom
- Post town: Bettyhill
- Postcode district: KW14 7
- Police: Scotland
- Fire: Scottish
- Ambulance: Scottish

Leckfurin (Scottish Gaelic: Leac Bhioirn, lit. 'Bjorn's Stone') is a small hamlet, which lies on the west bank of the River Naver (Abhainn Nabhair), in northern Sutherland in Scottish Highlands and is in the Scottish council area of Highland.

The A836 road runs through Leckfurin.

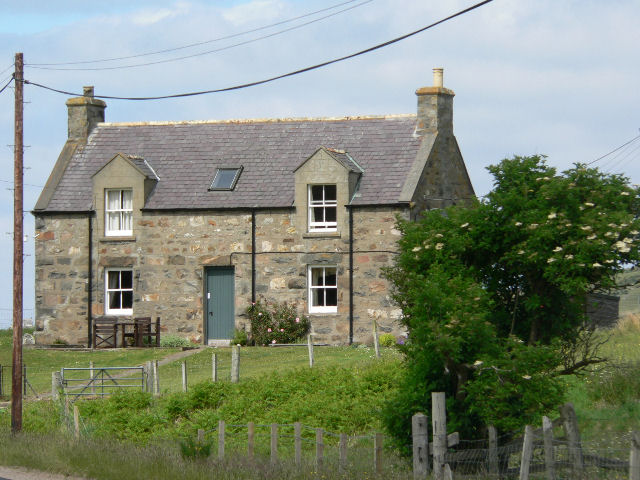
Traditional stone house at Leckfurin
