= Leigh Lake =

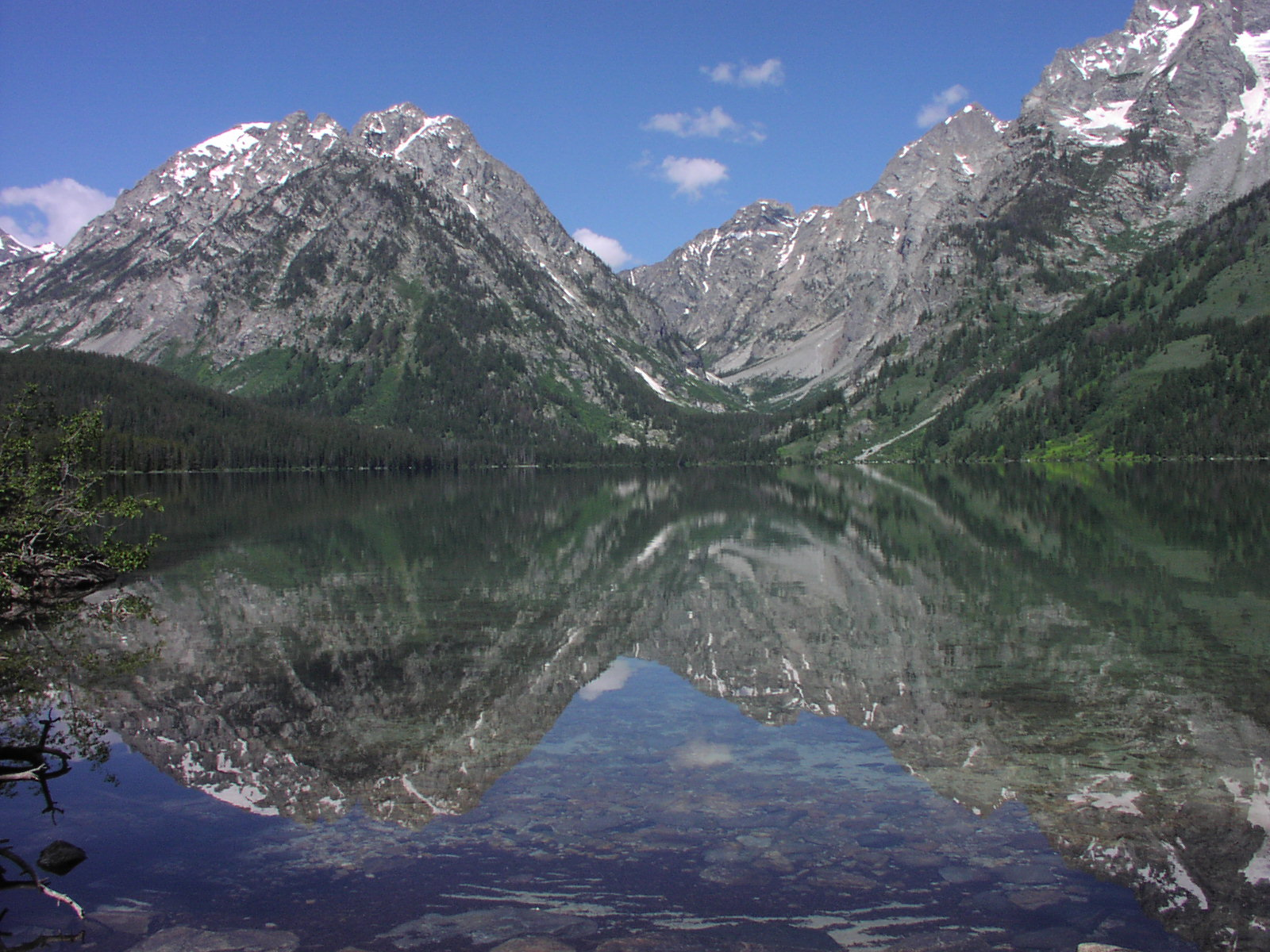
- Leigh Lake

- Location within Wyoming
- Location: Grand Teton National Park, Teton County, Wyoming, US
- Coordinates: 43°48′43″N 110°43′56″W
- Type: Glacial Lake
- Primary inflows: Several creeks
- Primary outflows: String Lake
- Basin countries: United States
- Max. length: 2.8 mi (4.5 km)
- Max. width: 2.4 mi (3.9 km)
- Surface area: 1,792 acres (725 ha)
- Max. depth: 250 ft (76 m)
- Surface elevation: 6,877 ft (2,096 m)
- Islands: 2

Leigh Lake is located in Grand Teton National Park, in the U. S. state of Wyoming. The glacially formed lake is 2.4 miles (3.9 km) wide and 2.8 miles (4.5 km) long from north to south. Situated just southeast of Mount Moran, the lake is at the terminus of both Paintbrush and Leigh Canyons. The lake can be accessed from the Leigh Lake Trail which follows the eastern shores of String Lake a distance of one mile (1.6 km) and is an easy hike over level terrain. The Leigh Lake Ranger Patrol Cabin is located on the northeast shore of the lake and is on the National Register of Historic Places.

The lake was named for Richard "Beaver Dick" Leigh, a mountain guide.

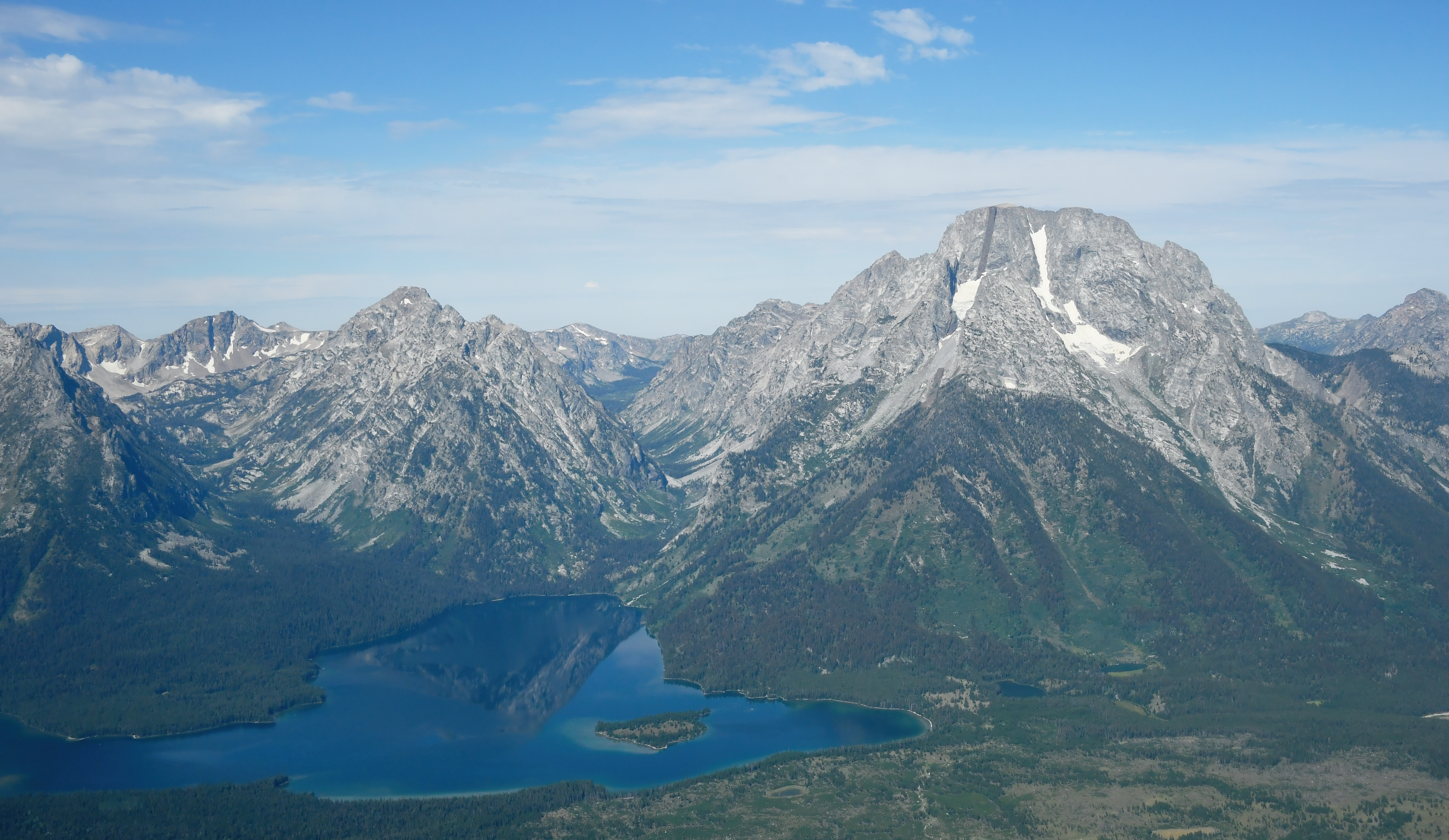
Leigh Lake (bottom left) with Paintbrush Canyon, Mount Woodring, Leigh Canyon, and Mount Moran above (from left to right)

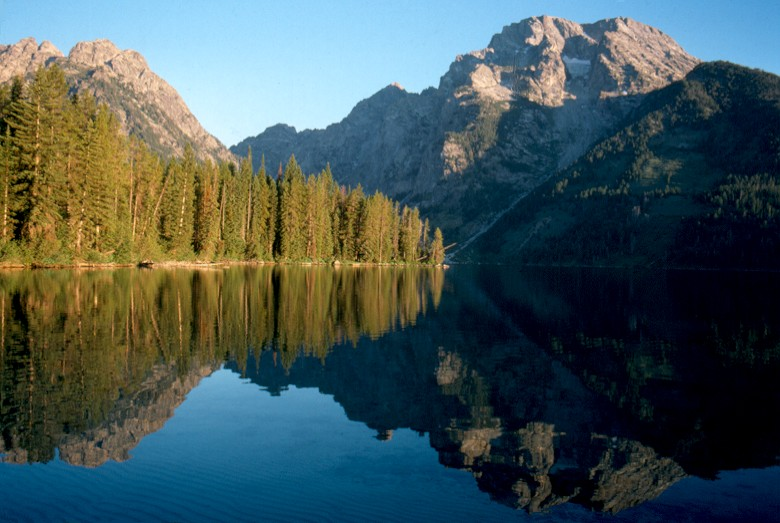
Leigh Lake

== See also ==
- Geology of the Grand Teton area
