= Lea (magazine) =

German women's magazine

- Categories: Women's magazine
- Frequency: Weekly
- First issue: 14 July 1999
- Company: Mediengruppe Klambt
- Country: Germany
- Based in: Hamburg
- Language: German

Lea is a German women's weekly magazine, first published in July 1999. In May 2014, the editorial headquarters were moved from Baden-Baden to Hamburg. As of 2020, its editor-in-chief was Britta Behrens.
