= Mount Woodring =

Mountain in the state of Wyoming

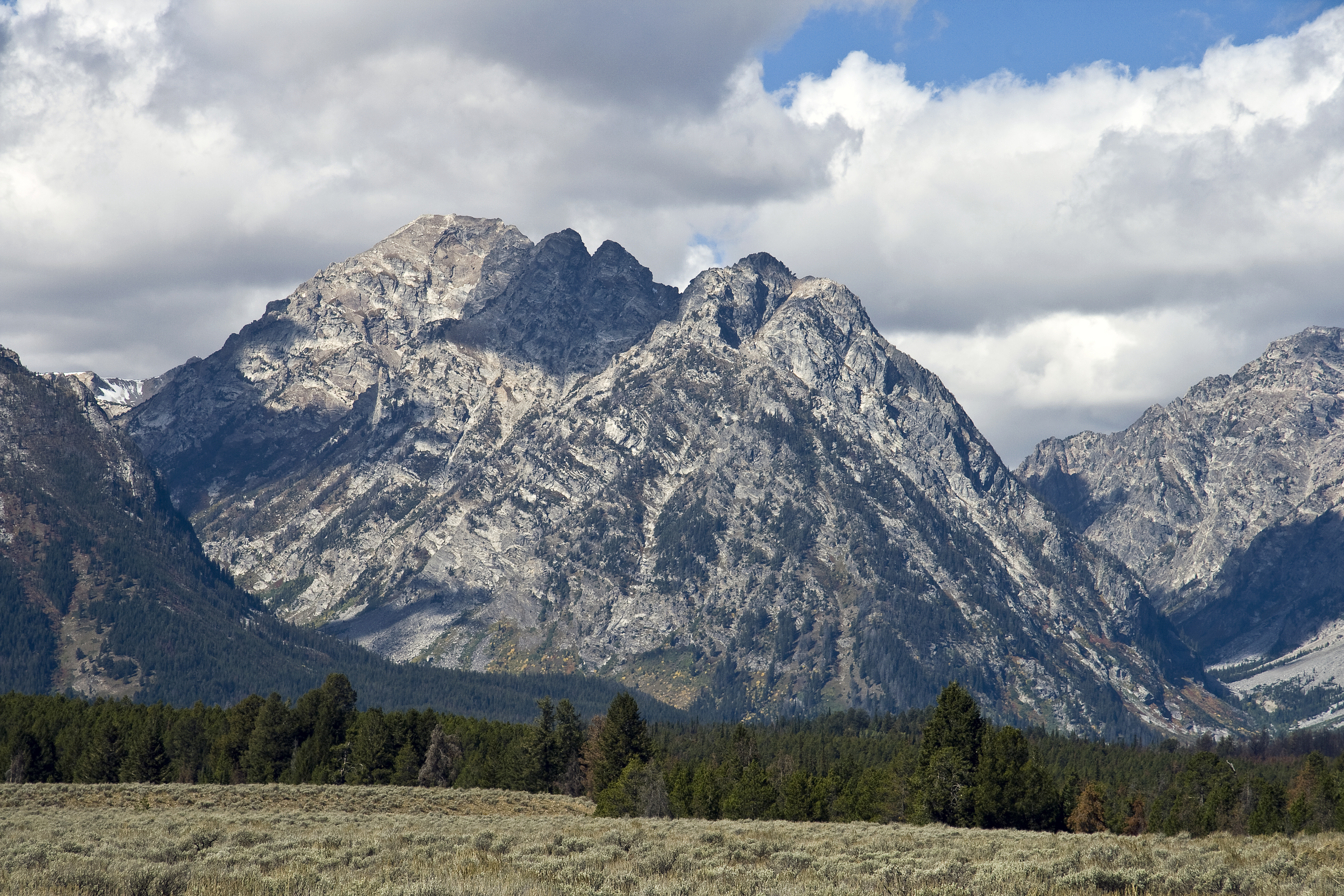
- Mount Woodring with Leigh Canyon at right and Paintbrush Canyon at left

Highest point
- Elevation: 11,595 ft (3,534 m)
- Prominence: 1,510 ft (460 m)
- Coordinates: 43°48′11″N 110°47′38″W

Geography
- Location within Wyoming Location within the United States
- Location: Grand Teton National Park, Teton County, Wyoming, U.S.
- Parent range: Teton Range
- Topo map: USGS Mount Moran

Climbing
- First ascent: Fryxell 1930
- Easiest route: Scramble

Mount Woodring (11,595 feet (3,534 m)) is located in the Teton Range, Grand Teton National Park, Wyoming. The mountain is immediately west of Leigh Lake and is sandwiched between Paintbrush Canyon to the south and Leigh Canyon to the north. The best access to the summit is from Paintbrush Divide along the Paintbrush Canyon Trail.

== Naming controversy ==
Mount Woodring is named for Samuel Woodring, the first superintendent of Grand Teton National Park from 1929–1934. He was removed as superintendent by National Park Service co-founder Horace M. Albright in 1934 after allegedly fondling a baby sitter. The allegations were discovered by Moose resident and retired professor Bob Righter in the late 1970s, and Righter called for the mountain's name to be changed in 2017.

In April 2025, the Wyoming Board of Geographic Names submitted a proposal to the United States Board on Geographic Names to rename the mountain to Mount Equality. Other names considered were Raven Peak, Mount Liberty, and Mount Grizzly 399. As of August 2025, the U.S. Board on Geographic Names has not yet ruled on the proposed name change.

== Gallery ==
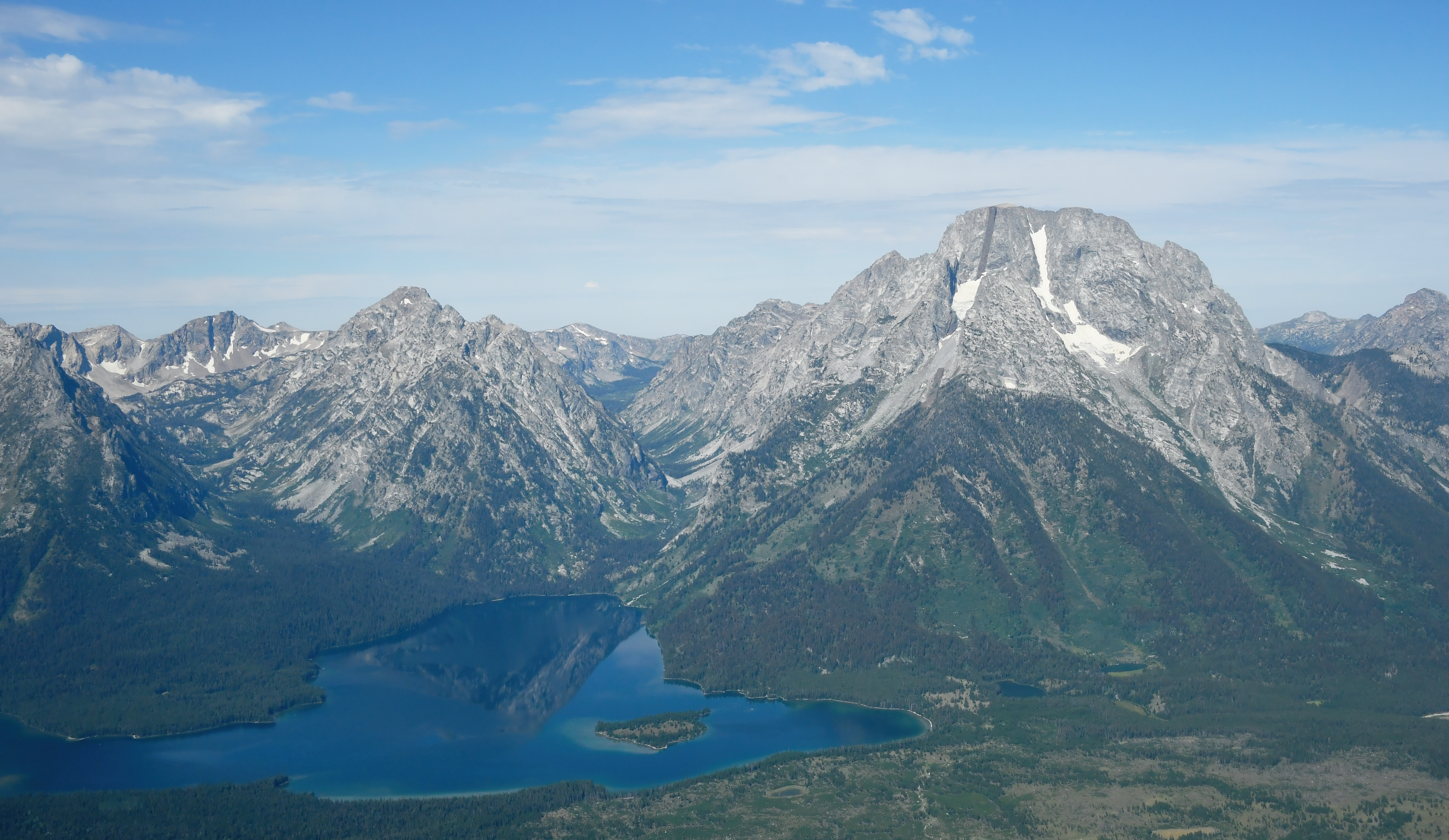
Mount Woodring, left of center, between Paintbrush Canyon and Leigh Canyon, with Mount Moran to the right

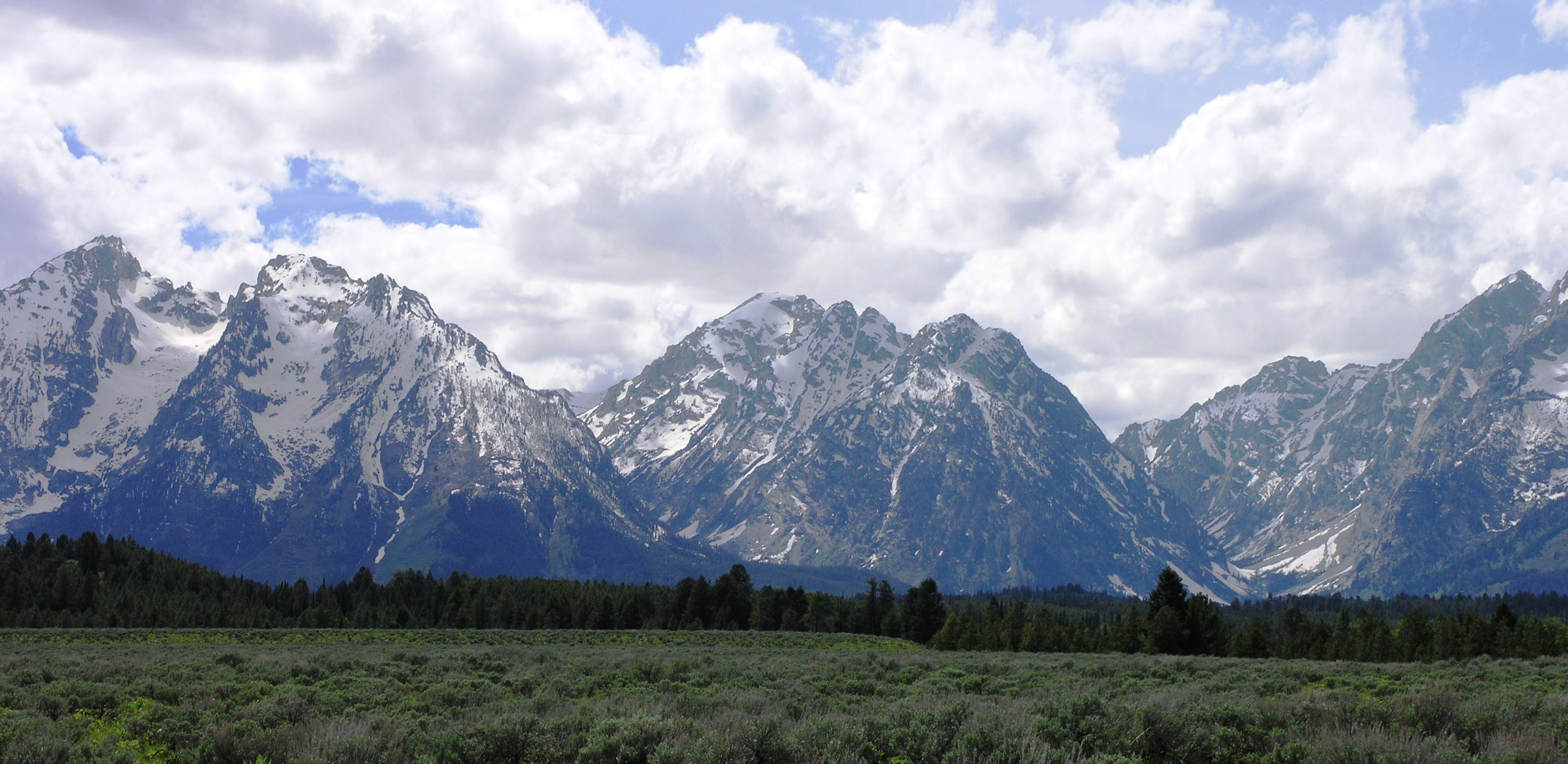
Mount Woodring in center
