= Lateral electrical surface stimulation =

- Specialty: Orthopedic

Lateral electrical surface stimulation is a neuromuscular stimulation treatment for idiopathic scoliosis. It is also known as the LESS treatment, and was invented by Dr. Jens Axelgaard in 1976. It is a non-invasive scoliosis treatment that utilizes electrical muscle stimulation, which is also known as neurostimulation or neuromuscular stimulation.

The LESS treatment is used to treat individuals with mild to moderate degrees of scoliosis, and is often used either as a replacement to or as a complement to traditional scoliosis bracing. The LESS treatment is a less intrusive form of scoliosis treatment, and eliminates the physical and psychological problems that can be associated with traditional bracing treatment.

In LESS treatment, the patient is treated through neuromuscular stimulation each night during sleep. Neurostimulation electrodes "are placed on the convex side of the curve in the region of the posterior to midaxillary line" in order to engage the back muscles through neuromuscular stimulation as the patient sleeps. The stimulation creates muscle contractions and strengthens the patient's back in order to gradually straighten out the spinal curvature.
