= Mount Saint John =

Mountain in the state of Wyoming

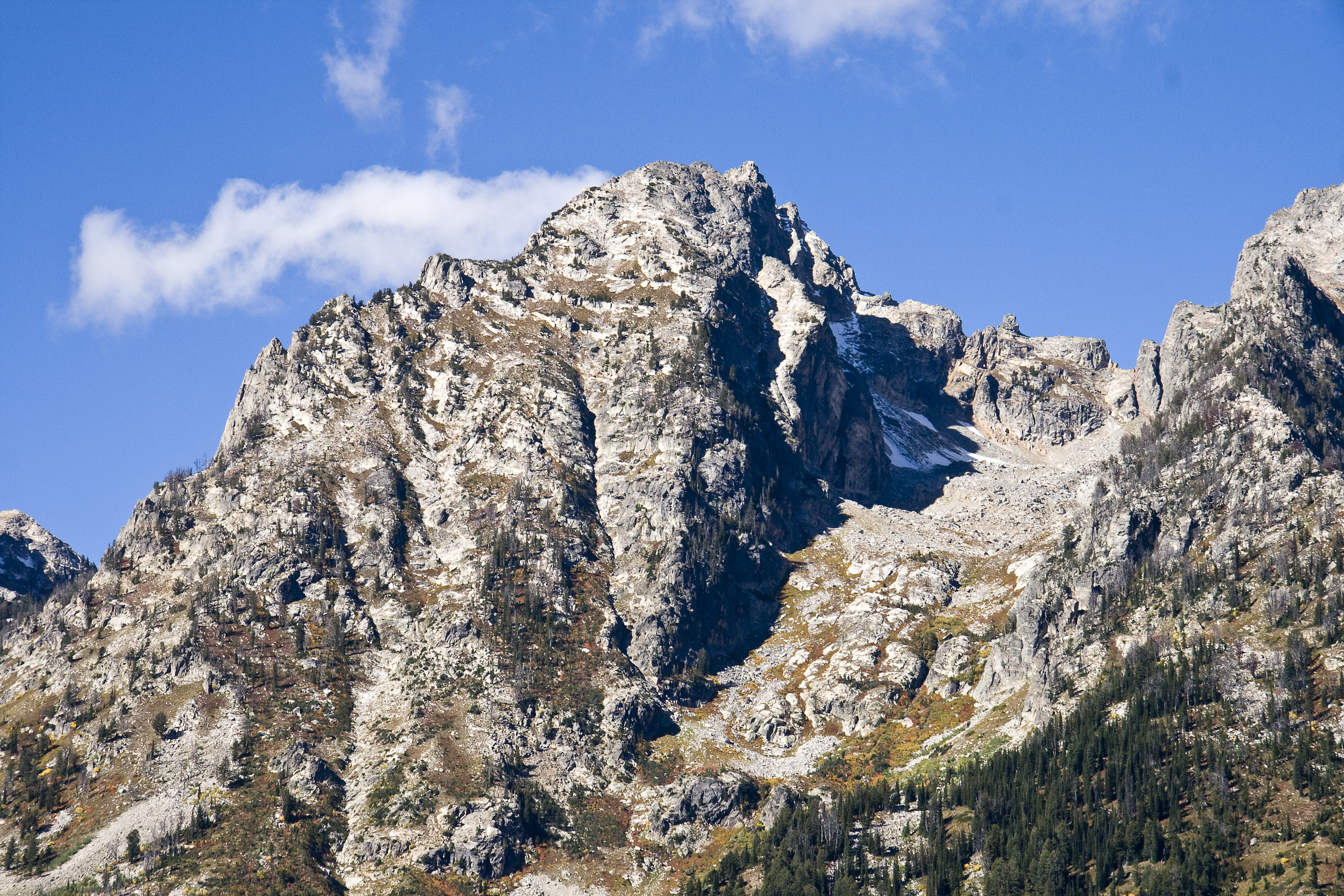
- Mount Saint John

Highest point
- Elevation: 11,435 ft (3,485 m) NAVD 88
- Prominence: 1,350 ft (410 m)
- Coordinates: 43°46′55″N 110°46′24″W

Geography
- Location within Wyoming Location within the United States
- Location: Grand Teton National Park, Teton County, Wyoming, U.S.
- Parent range: Teton Range
- Topo map: USGS Mount Moran

Climbing
- First ascent: Fryxell/Smith 1929
- Easiest route: Scramble

Mount Saint John, height 11,435 feet (3,485 m), is located in the Teton Range, Grand Teton National Park, Wyoming, northwest of Jenny Lake. The mountain towers above the northwest shore of Jenny Lake, and along with Symmetry Spire and Rockchuck Peak, form a massif which looms to the north above Cascade Canyon. The scenic Lake of the Crags, a cirque lake or tarn, is located immediately south of the summit and is accessed by way of Hanging Canyon. In 1931, the mountain was named in honor of explorer and geologist Orestes St. John.

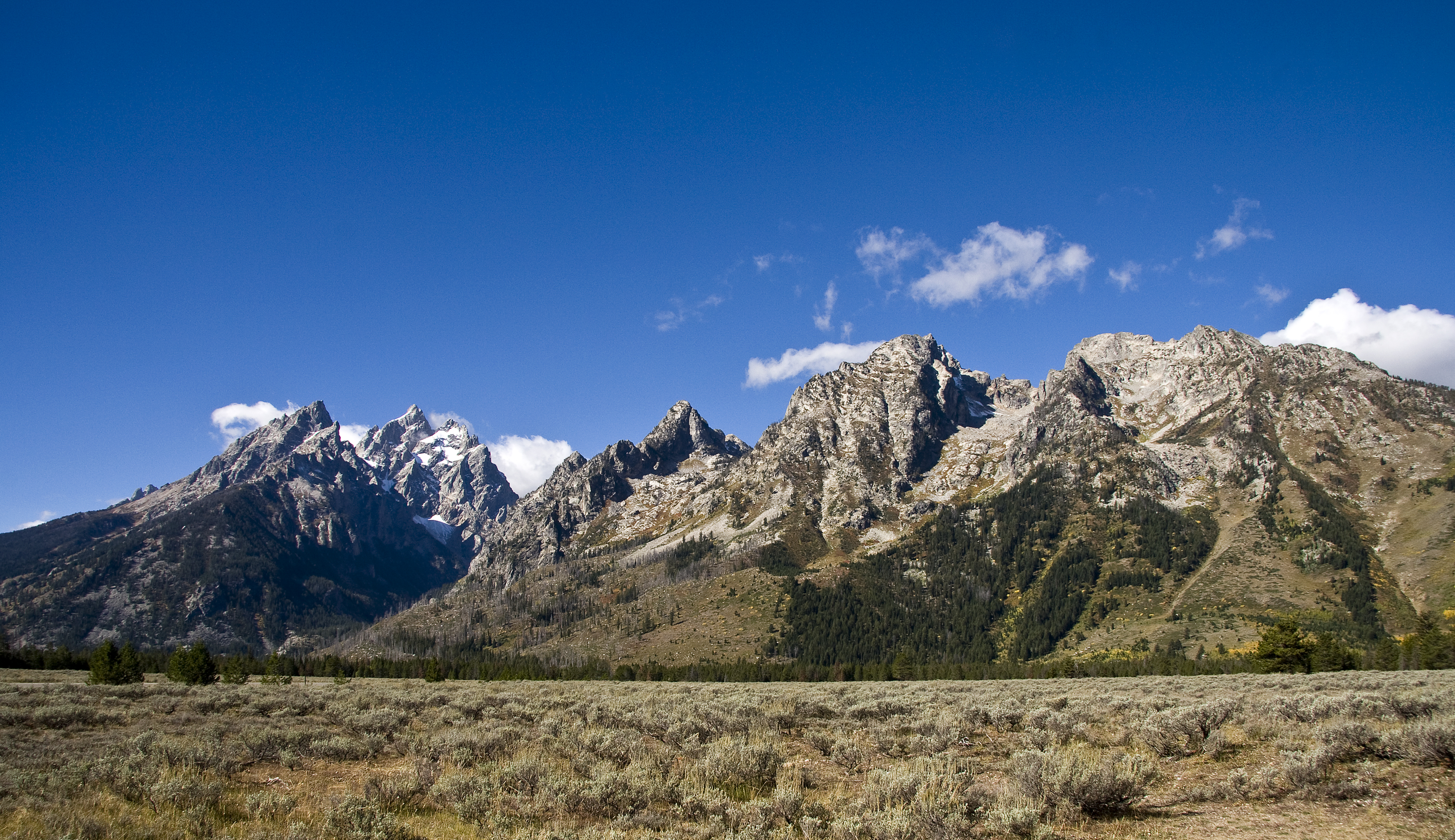
Teton Range left to right with the Cathedral Group, Cascade Canyon, Symmetry Spire, Mount Saint John and Rockchuck Peak
