= Education Law Association =

- Founded: Topeka, Kansas, 1954
- Type: Professional association
- Headquarters: Philadelphia, Pennsylvania
- Website: educationlaw.org

The Education Law Association (ELA) is a professional association founded in 1954. It offers neutral information regarding the present legal problems which could have an impact on education and the people related to education in public and private K-12 schools, universities, and colleges to its professional members.

ELA's members comprise scholars and practitioners, including attorneys, professors, administrators, students, public officials, advocates, and education writers, from plaintiff- as well as defense-side and labor as well as management. ELA is the publisher of books about education law that are used as resources in the field and as textbooks in university courses.

== Purpose ==
On its website, ELA describes its purpose, mission, and vision as follows:

Purpose: The Education Law Association improves education by promoting interest in and understanding of education law.

Mission: The Education Law Association is to be the premier association for practical knowledge, scholarship, and interdisciplinary dialogue about legal and policy issues affecting all levels of education.

Vision: The Education Law Association will improve education by developing connections between education law, the study of education law, and the application of education law in the field while promoting diversity, equity, inclusivity, and excellence in all levels of education.

We carry out these ends by holding meetings for the presentation and discussion of education law issues, stimulating the teaching and learning of education law, and issuing publications and other information on education law. The Education Law Association serves as a clearinghouse for information on research and publications and provides other member-related services.
