= Lea (unit) =

British unit of length

The lea or lay was a British unit of length.

The Oxford English Dictionary describes it as a measure "of varying quantity". It cites quotations from within various areas of the textile industry, which define it as "80 yards" (1888 note on a 1399 text), "200 Threds reel'd on a Reel four yards about" (1696), "each lay containing 200 yards" (1704), "eighty threads" (1776), "forty threads" (1825), "300 yards" (1882) and "in worsted 80 yards; in cotton and silk 120 yards" (1885).
