= Leah (disambiguation) =

Leah was the first wife of the Biblical patriarch Jacob.

Leah may also refer to:

== Places ==
- Leah, Iran, a village in Gilan Province, Iran
- Leah Peak, Alberta, Canada
- Leah Lake, Idaho, United States
- Leah Ridge, Antarctica

== People with the name ==
- Leah (given name)
- Leah (musician), Canadian heavy metal musician
- Anna Leah, English-born New Zealand pop singer in the 1970s
- John Leah (born 1978), English footballer
- Sandy Leah (born 1983), Brazilian singer, songwriter, producer, and actress
- Vince Leah (1913–1993), Canadian journalist, writer and sports administrator

== Arts and entertainment ==
=== Fictional entities ===
- Leah (The Walking Dead), a fictional character from the television series The Walking Dead
- Leah, one of the main characters in Shimmer and Shine
- Leah, New Hampshire, a fictional town created by Thomas Williams (writer) and depicted in Leah, New Hampshire: Collected Stories Of Thomas Williams
- Queen Leah, fictional character in the Sleeping Beauty
- Leah, a non-playable character in Diablo III

=== Music ===
- Leah (album), only album released by Leah Hayward
- "Leah," a 1962 Roy Orbison song
- "Leah", a song by Bruce Springsteen from Devils & Dust

=== Other uses in arts and entertainment ===
- Leah (sculpture), a sculpture by Michelangelo

== Other uses ==
- Leah, an 8" refractor telescope at the Chabot Space and Science Center

== See also ==
- Lea (disambiguation)
- Lee (disambiguation)
- Leia
- Leigh (disambiguation)
- Lia
