= Leigh Canyon =

Canyon in the state of Wyoming

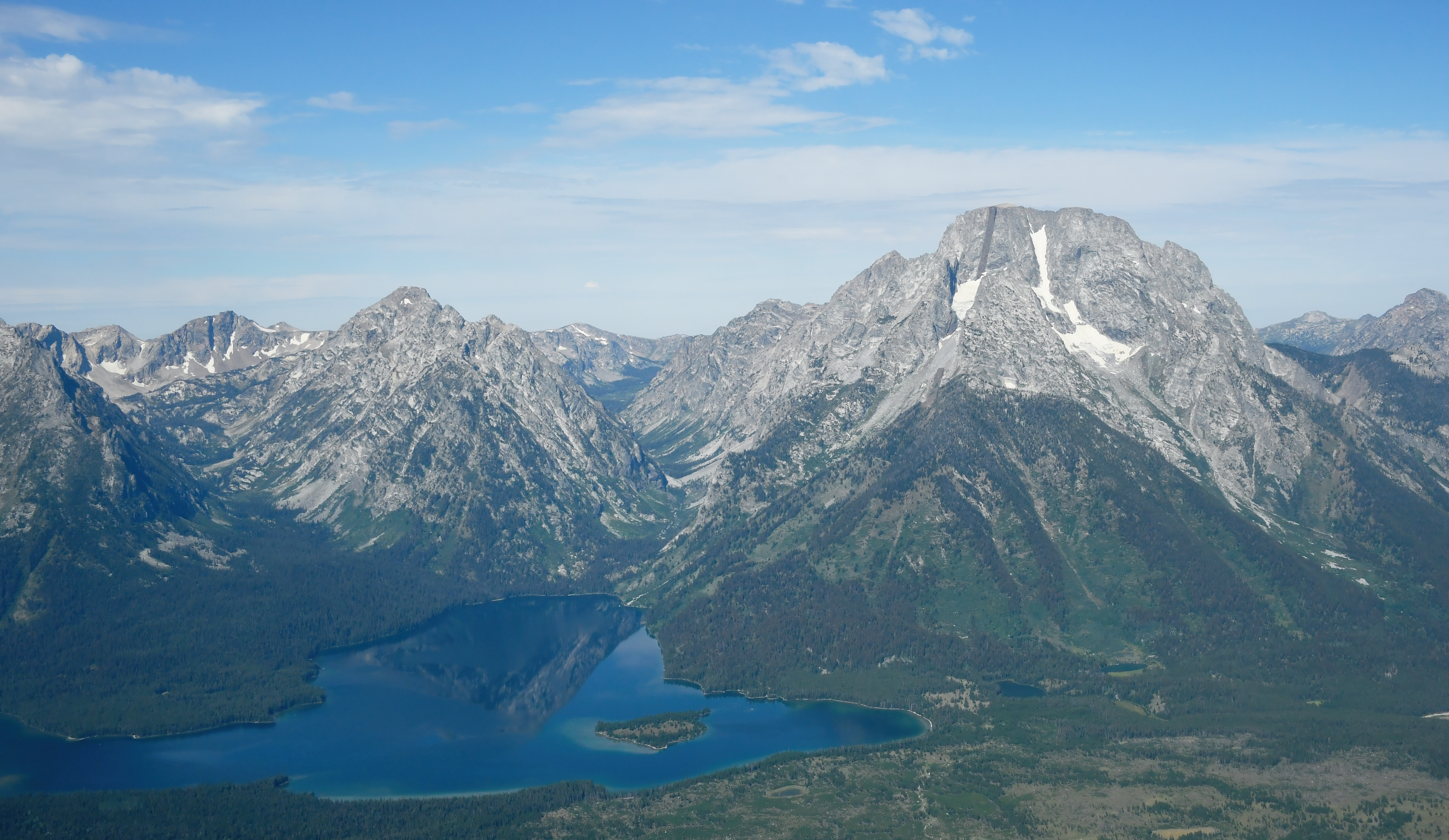
- Leigh Canyon in the center of the image with Mount Woodring to the left, Mount Moran to the right, and Lake Leigh below

Geography
- Country: United States
- State: Wyoming
- County: Teton
- Coordinates: 43°48′53″N 110°45′14″W
- Lake: Leigh Lake
- Interactive map of Leigh Canyon

Leigh Canyon is located in Grand Teton National Park, in the U. S. state of Wyoming. The canyon was formed by glaciers which retreated at the end of the Last Glacial Maximum approximately 15,000 years ago, leaving behind a U-shaped valley. Leigh Canyon is approximately 6 miles (9.7 km) long and is flanked by Mount Moran and Thor Peak to the north and Mount Woodring to the south. The canyon outlet is at Leigh Lake and at the head of the canyon lies Mink Lake.

== See also ==
- Canyons of the Teton Range
- Geology of the Grand Teton area
