= Leigh Green =

Hamlet in Kent, England

Coordinates: 51.066°N 0.711°E

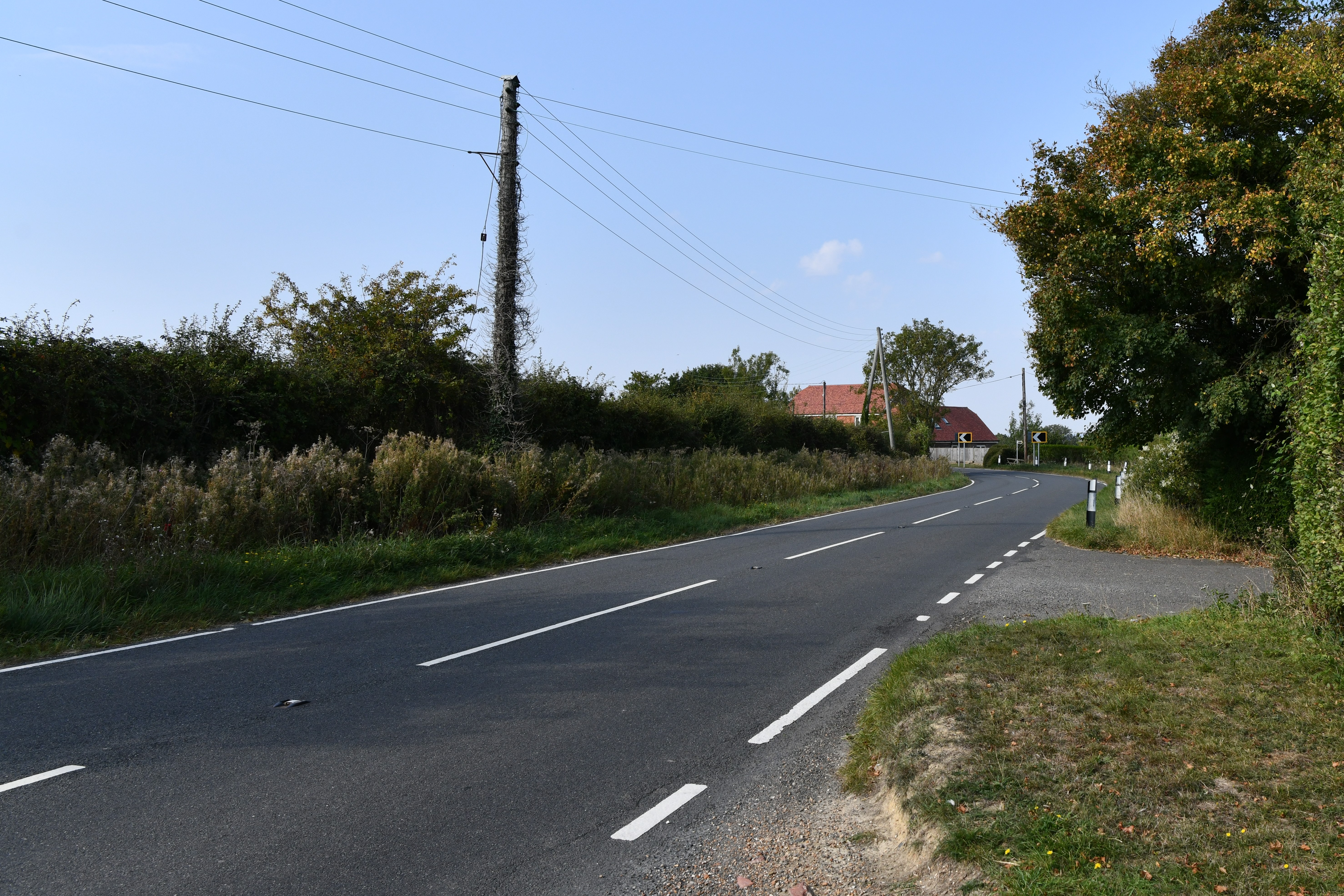
- Appledore Road

- Location within Kent
- District: Ashford
- Shire county: Kent
- Region: South East
- Country: England
- Sovereign state: United Kingdom
- Post town: Tenterden
- Postcode district: TN30
- Police: Kent
- Fire: Kent
- Ambulance: South East Coast
- UK Parliament: Weald of Kent

Leigh Green is a hamlet 2 miles (3 km) southeast of the town of Tenterden in Kent, England.
