= Coles River =

Cole River or (Coles River) may refer to:

- Cole River flowing from Dighton, Massachusetts through Swansea, Massachusetts to Mount Hope Bay
- Cole Brook, a short stream flowing from Rehoboth, Massachusetts into the Cole River
- Coles Brook flowing from Rehoboth, Massachusetts through Seekonk, Massachusetts to the Ten Mile River
