= Lees =

Lees may refer to:

== Businesses ==
- Lees of Scotland, a confectionery maker
- Lees Hotel, Ingham, Queensland, Australia
- J.W. Lees Brewery, a brewery in Middleton, Greater Manchester, England

== Places ==
=== England ===
- Lees, Derbyshire, a village
- Lees, Greater Manchester, a town near Oldham
- Lees Urban District, a former local government district in the administrative county of Lancashire

=== United States ===
- Lees River, Massachusetts
- Lees Creek (Ohio)
- Lees Creek (Lackawanna River tributary), Lackawanna County, Pennsylvania

=== Elsewhere ===
- River Lees, Bahamas
- Léez, a river in France also spelled Lées, Léès or Lees

== People ==
- Lees (surname), with a list of people of this name
- Lees (given name), a list of people

== Transportation ==
- Lees railway station, a closed railway station in Lancashire, England
- Lees station, a light rail station in Ottawa, Ontario, Canada
- Lees Avenue, Ottawa, Ontario, a street (and a neighbourhood)

== Other uses ==
- Lees (fermentation), dead yeast and debris left after fermentation of wine, beer, etc.
- Laboratory for Electromagnetic and Electronic Systems (LEES), Massachusetts Institute of Technology
- Lees baronets, three titles in the Baronetage of the United Kingdom
- Lees College, a campus in Jackson, Kentucky of Hazard Community and Technical College, a defunct public community college
- Lees GAA, a defunct Cork-based Gaelic Athletic Association club
- Lima Lees, a former American minor league professional baseball team based in Lima, Ohio

== See also ==
- Lees Priory, a former Augustinian priory in Derbyshire, United Kingdom
- Lee's (disambiguation)
- Leese (disambiguation)
- Lee (disambiguation)
- Lease
- Leece
