= Lee's =

Lee's may refer to:

== Companies ==
- Lee's Famous Recipe Chicken, an American fried chicken restaurant chain
- Lee's Sandwiches, a Vietnamese-American fast food restaurant chain

== Places ==
- Lee's Ferry, a site along the Colorado River in Coconino County, Arizona, United States
- Lee's Crossing, a neighborhood of Marietta, Georgia, United States, in suburban Atlanta
- Lee's Palace, a rock concert hall in Toronto, Ontario, Canada
- Lees River in Massachusetts, United States
- Lees Station, Tennessee, an unincorporated community in Bledsoe County, Tennessee, United States
- Lee's Summit, a city in Missouri, United States

== See also ==
- Lee (disambiguation)
- Lees (disambiguation)
