= William P. Mason House =

Historic house in Massachusetts, United States

- U.S. National Register of Historic Places
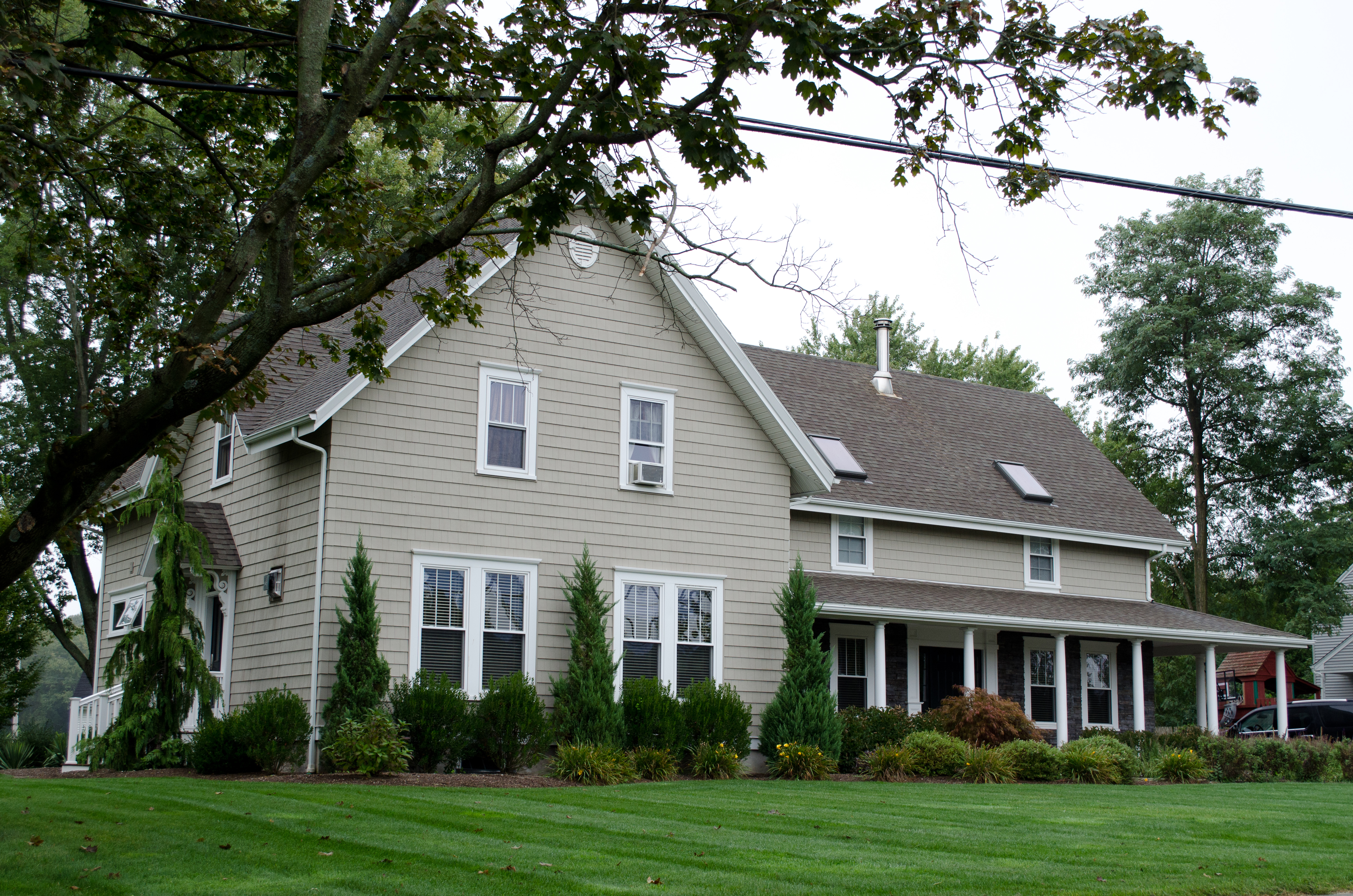

- Location within Massachusetts Location within the United States
- Location: 5 Mason Street, Swansea, Massachusetts
- Coordinates: 41°46′21″N 71°16′24″W
- Built: c. 1860
- Architectural style: Gothic Revival
- MPS: Swansea MRA
- NRHP reference No.: 90000121
- Added to NRHP: August 8, 1990

The William P. Mason House is a historic house located in Swansea, Massachusetts.

== Description and history ==
It is a 1 1/2-story, wood-framed structure, with a side gable roof and clapboard siding. The main facade is asymmetrical, with an off-center gable and its entry sheltered by a bracketed hood. A 1 1/2-story ell extends to the rear, with a porch extending along its side. The house was built in about 1860. It occupied a prominent role in the village of Barneyville, serving as hotel, tavern, and post office at various times before about 1930, when it reverted to strictly residential use.

The house was listed on the National Register of Historic Places on August 8, 1990.

== See also ==
- National Register of Historic Places listings in Bristol County, Massachusetts
