= McLeese =

McLeese, Mac Leese, or McCLees, may refer to:

== People ==
- Dana Dane (born 1965), stagename of Dana McLeese, U.S. hiphop artist
- Robert McLeese (1828–1898), Canadian hotelier
- Roy W. McLeese III, American judge
- Sarah A. McClees (1822–1913), American temperance activist

== Places ==
- McLeese Lake, British Columbia, Canada, an unincorporated community
- McLeese Lake (originally Mud Lake), a lake in Cariboo, British Columbia, Canada

== See also ==
- Leese (disambiguation)
- 5641 McCleese, an asteroid
