= Hortonville, Massachusetts =

Village in Massachusetts, United States

- Hortonville Historic District
- U.S. National Register of Historic Places
- U.S. Historic district
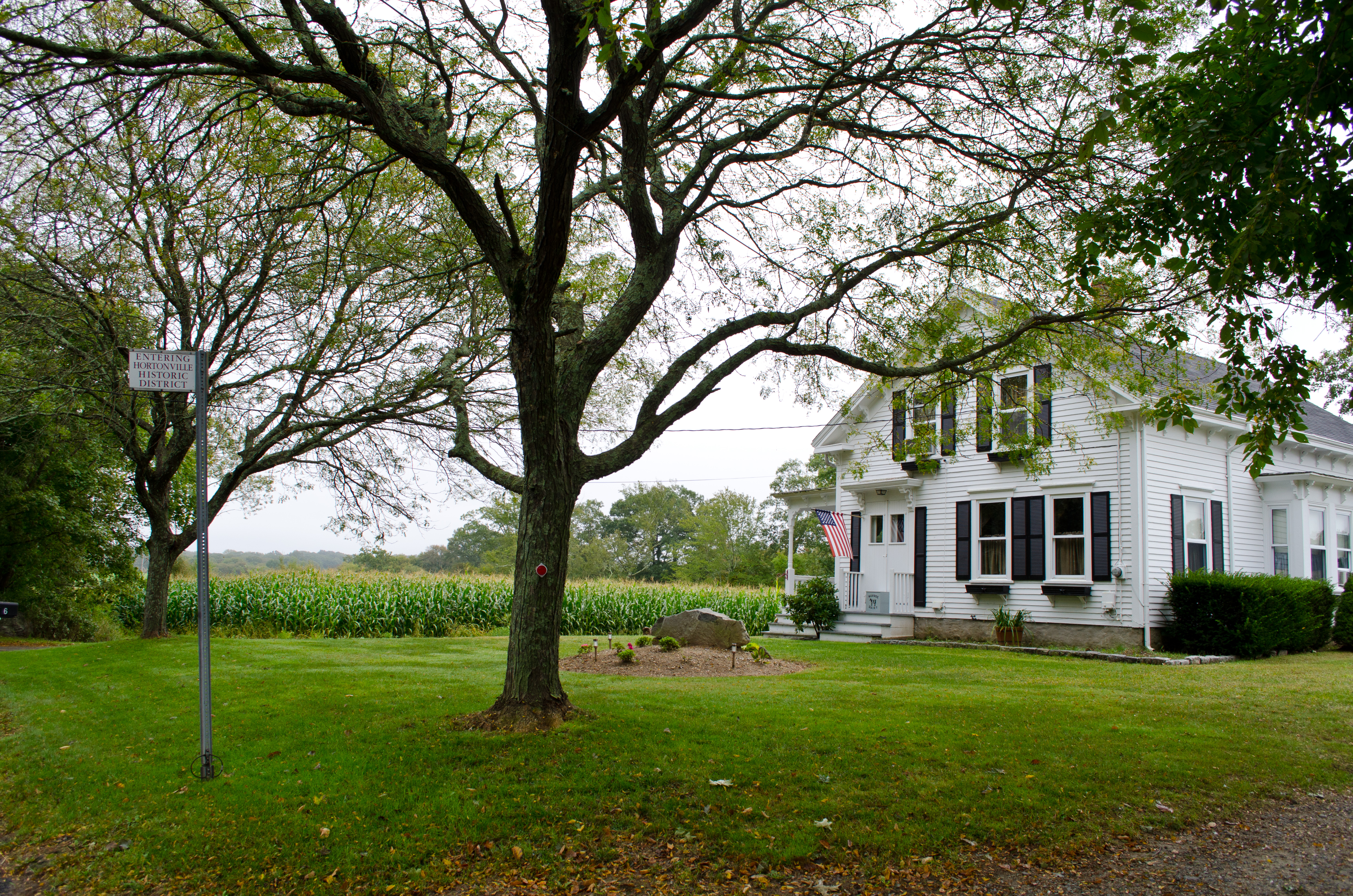

- Location within Massachusetts Location within the United States
- Location: Swansea, Massachusetts
- Coordinates: 41°46′27″N 71°12′36″W
- Area: 122 acres (49 ha)
- Architectural style: Greek Revival, Georgian, Federal
- MPS: Swansea MRA
- NRHP reference No.: 90000051
- Added to NRHP: February 16, 1990

Hortonville is a village in the town of Swansea, Massachusetts, United States. The part of the village on Locust Street from Oak Street to Hortonville Road comprises the Hortonville Historic District, which was listed on the National Register of Historic Places in 1990.

== History and description ==
Hortonville is located in northern Swansea, near its border with Rehoboth. Locust Street is the principal roadway through the area, running roughly east–west. The area was first settled in the 18th century by the Hale, Martin, and Eddy families. These families built homes on farmland they owned in the western end of the village. The eastern end of the village, along the Cole River, became the site of several gristmills, lending the village the name "Swansea Factory." In the 1830s, a school, church, and Universalist hall were built in the village. Nathaniel Horton settled in the area in 1856 and helped the village gain its own post office, which was named Hortonville in his honor. After 1900, industrial development in the area stalled, and the village became a residential and agricultural area.

As a result of this development pattern, the area has a well-preserved concentration of late 18th to late 19th-century housing. Its oldest house, 397 Locust Street, was built in 1736, and is a typical Georgian house. Other examples of mid-18th century housing exist, but most have been updated, typically in the 19th century with Greek Revival styling. A small cluster of Federal period houses stand at the eastern end of Locust Street and on Maiden Lane. The only major non-residential building is the former Hortonville School (Greek Revival, c. 1838).

== See also ==
- National Register of Historic Places listings in Bristol County, Massachusetts
