= Somerset Village Historic District =

Historic district in Massachusetts, United States

- U.S. National Register of Historic Places
- U.S. Historic district
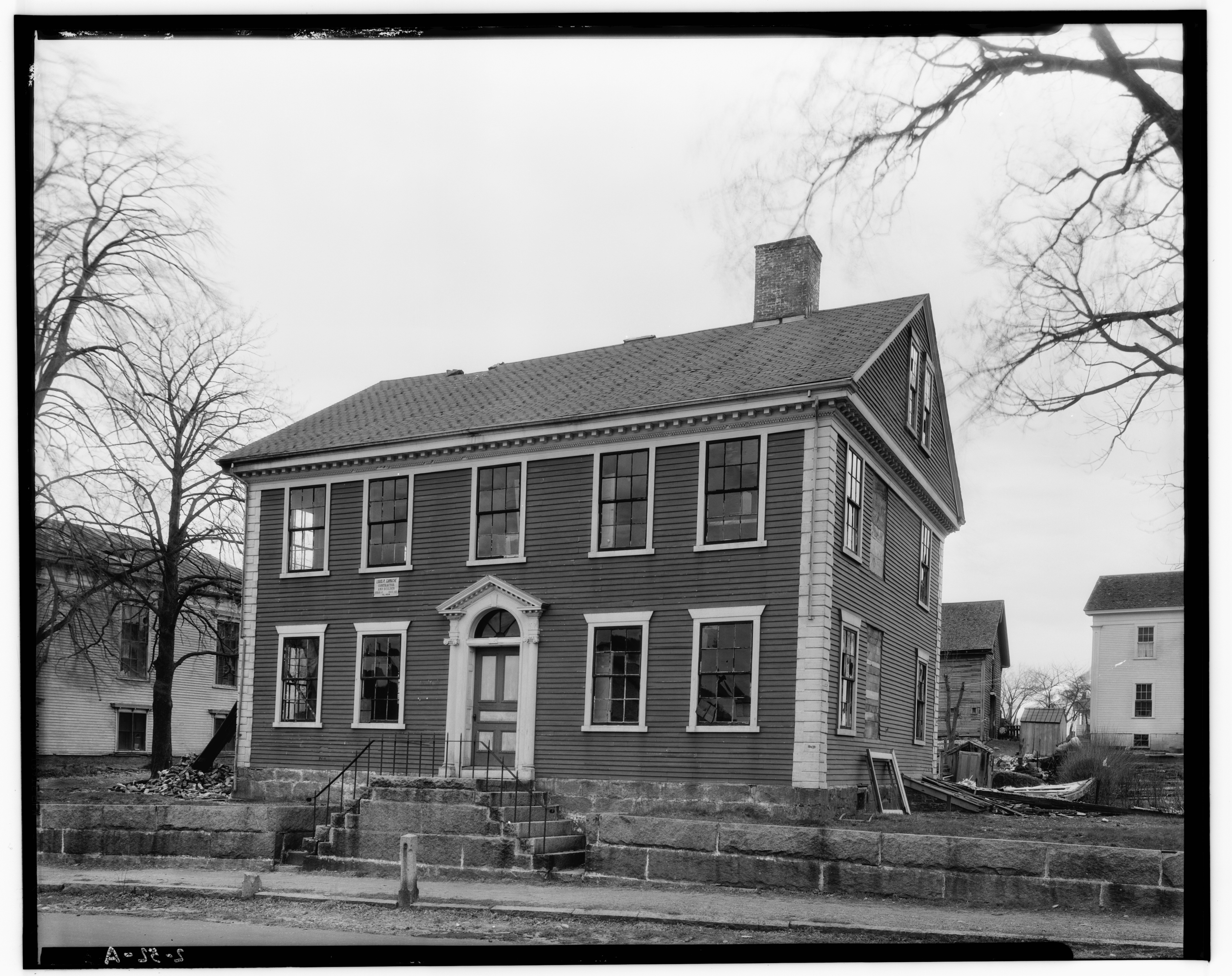
- Pettis House

- Location within Massachusetts Location within the United States
- Location: Avon St., Borland Ave., Cherry St., Church St., Clark St., Dublin St., High St., Main St., Maple St., Marsh St., Old Colony Ave., Palmer St., Peterson St., Pierce Ln., Pleasant St., School St., Simms Ave., and South St. Swansea, Massachusetts
- Coordinates: 41°46′24″N 71°7′33″W
- Area: 110 acres (45 ha)
- Architectural style: Italianate, Georgian, Federal
- NRHP reference No.: 100005075
- Added to NRHP: March 13, 2020

The Somerset Village Historic District is a historic district encompassing the historic town center of Somerset, Massachusetts, US. Settled in the 17th century, the village developed around a shipyard and pottery works, and became the town center when it was incorporated out of Swansea in 1790. Architecturally it is reflective mainly of its 19th-century growth, with stylistically diverse buildings. The district was added to the National Register of Historic Places in 2020.

== Description and history ==
Somerset Village lies on the west bank of the Taunton River in northern Somerset, bounded roughly on the west by Somerset Reservoir and its outlet stream. Its principal roadways are Main Street, which parallels the riverfront, and High Street, which parallels Main Street on ridge further west. Between these roads are a series of short cross streets. Most of the village is residential, with architectural styles ranging from the Georgian (early 18th century) to mid-19th century Italianate, with the oldest dating to about 1723. Prominent public buildings include the Baptist Church (1804) and St. Patrick's Catholic Church (1873), the former a fine example of Greek Revival architecture and the latter of the Romanesque Revival. Buildings surviving from the village's 19th-century shipyards survive at either end of the village.

Somerset was first settled by English colonists in the 1670s, after the area was purchased from Native Americans and became part of Swansea. This village was known from its early days as Bowers Shore, after Jonathan Bowers who established the first shipyard here in 1705. It became a port dealing in foreign goods, and was a whaling center until the mid-18th century. Shipbuilding remained an important industry, and the village was home to shipbuilders and ship captains. A fire did extensive damage to the northern end of the village in 1875. The shipyards closed in the early 20th century, and the village has since become more of a suburban residential hub.

== See also ==
- National Register of Historic Places listings in Bristol County, Massachusetts
