= Barneyville Historic District =

Historic district in Massachusetts, United States

- U.S. National Register of Historic Places
- U.S. Historic district
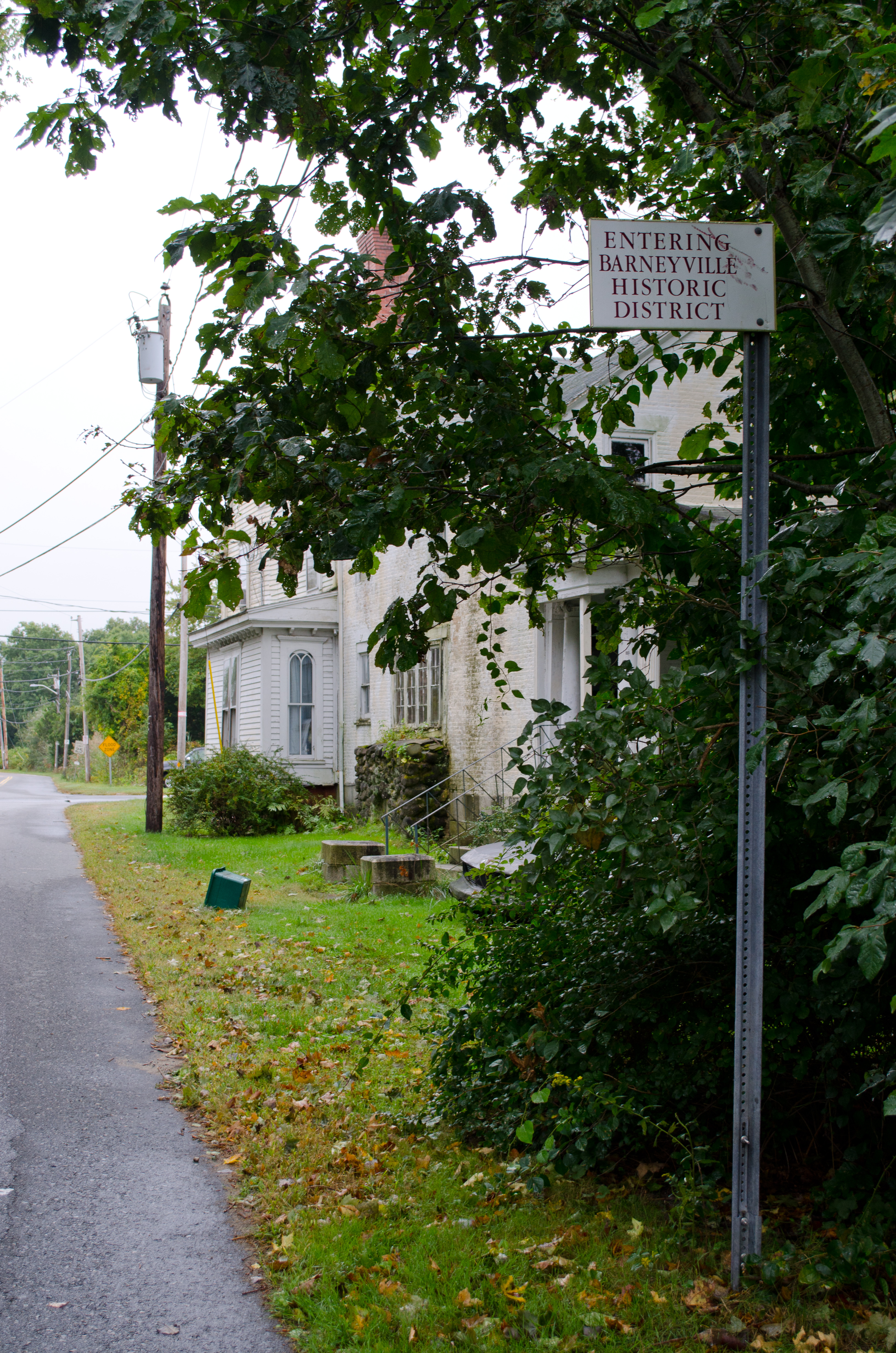

- Location within Massachusetts Location within the United States
- Location: Swansea, Massachusetts
- Coordinates: 41°46′17″N 71°17′0″W
- Area: 27 acres (11 ha)
- Architectural style: Colonial Revival, Greek Revival, Federal, Ranch
- MPS: Swansea MRA
- NRHP reference No.: 90000052
- Added to NRHP: February 16, 1990

The Barneyville Historic District is a predominantly residential historic district on Old Providence and Barneyville Roads in northwestern Swansea, Massachusetts. The area was the site of a successful shipbuilding operation during the early 19th century, and then became a local center for jewelry making. The district was added to the National Register of Historic Places in 1990.

== Description and history ==
Barneyville is centered on the junction of Old Providence and Barneyville Roads, and extends eastward along Old Providence Road toward the Palmer River. Although the area was first settled in the 17th century, it only began to grow as a proper village in the mid-18th century, when a bridge was built over the river to what is now Barrington, Rhode Island. It became known as a shipbuilding center after Jonathan Barney established a shipyard there in the 1770s that saw its greatest success under Barney's son Mason in the 19th century. The shipyard, which built wooden ships, failed when demand for metal-hulled ships rose in the late 1850s. One of the former shipyard workers learned to make jewelry, and built a small factory on the shipyard site, which flourished until the 1920s. Neither the jewelry factory nor the shipyard structures have survived; the site now has a marker.

The district covers about 27 acres (11 ha), and includes 11 primary buildings, and two sites: that of the shipyard, and that of the house of the area's first settler, the Rev. John Myles. The oldest surviving building in the district is the c. 1750 house of Jonathan Barney at 166 Old Providence Road. The house includes both Georgian and later Federal period styling, and has a locally rare brick ell. Barney also built the double house at 22-24 Barneyville Road c. 1771-74. Mason Barney's house, at 1 Barneyville Road, was built in the early 19th century, and is a fine Federal period structure with Colonial Revival alterations made in the early 20th century.

== Gallery ==
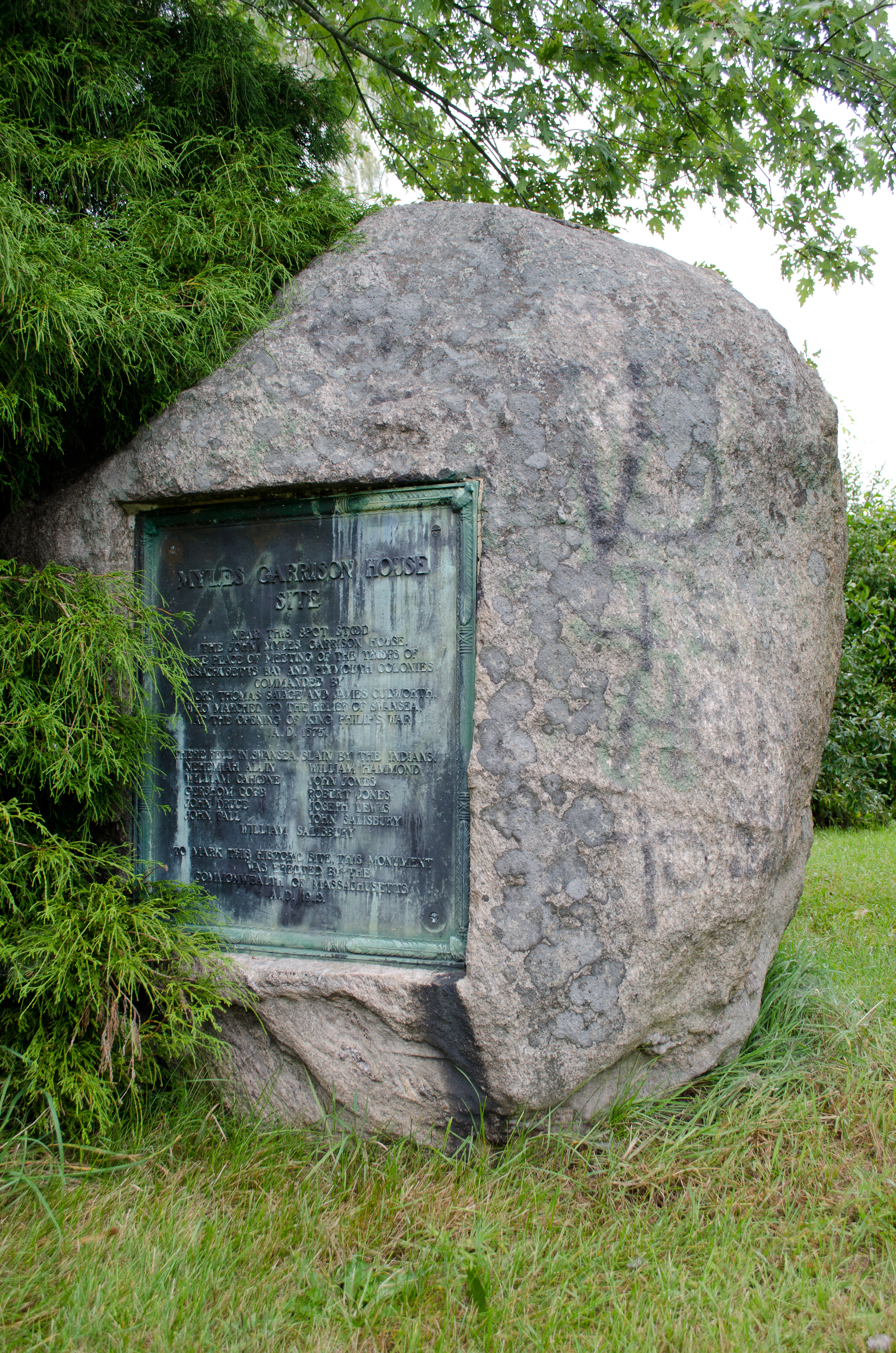
The Myles Garrison House Site monument

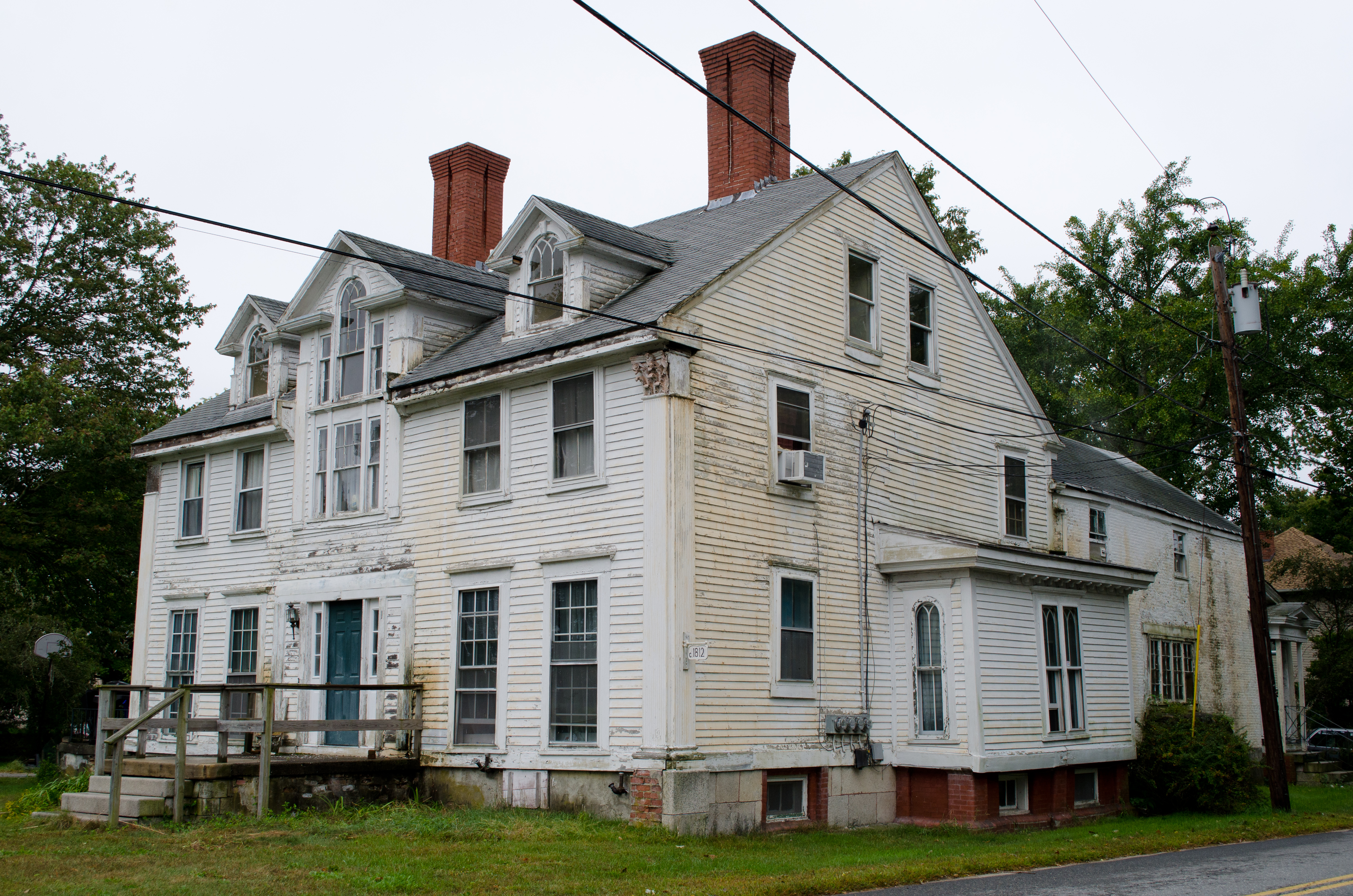
Historic house at the intersection of Old Providence Road and Barneyville Road

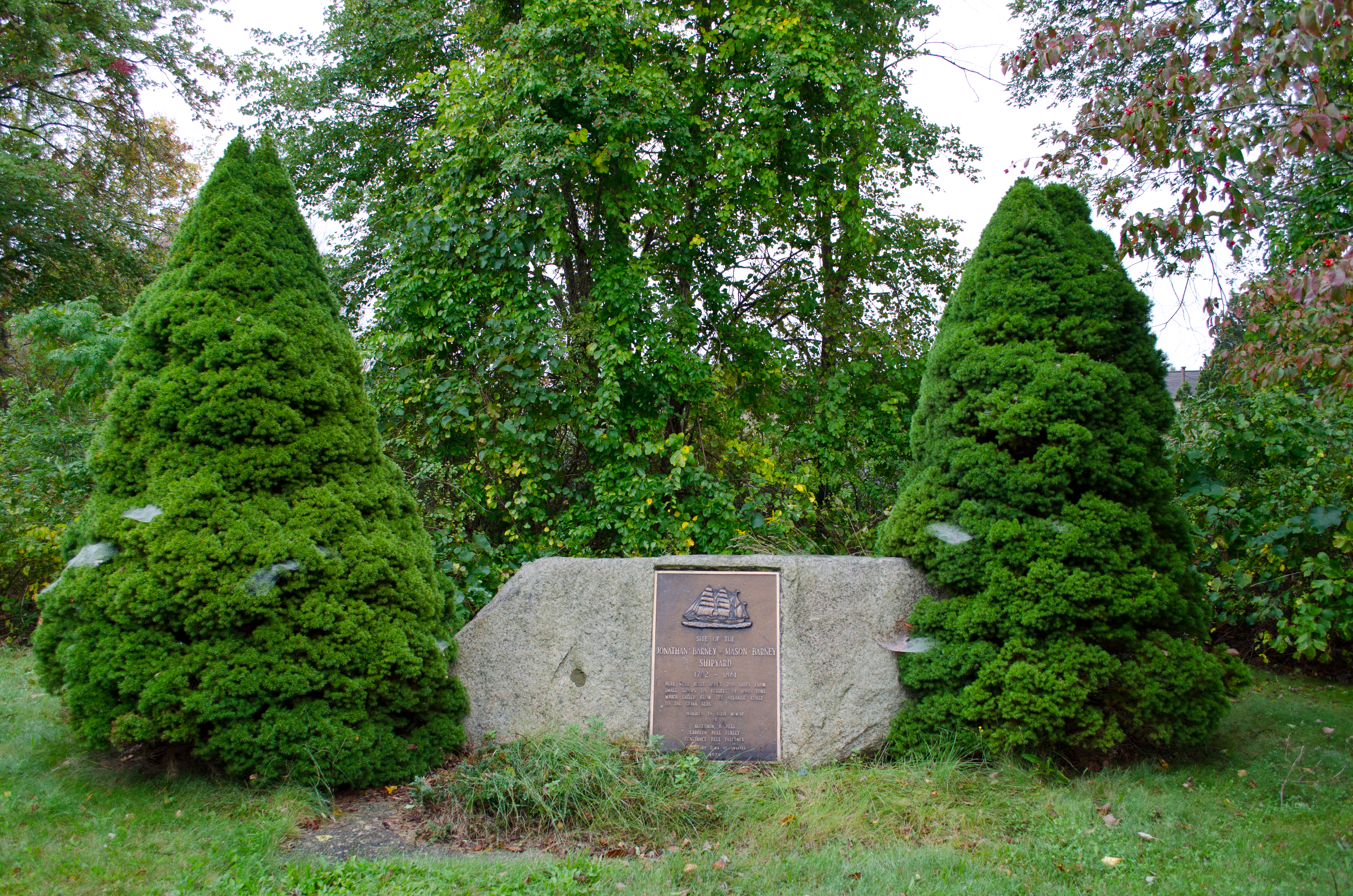
Monument marking the site of the Barney Shipyard

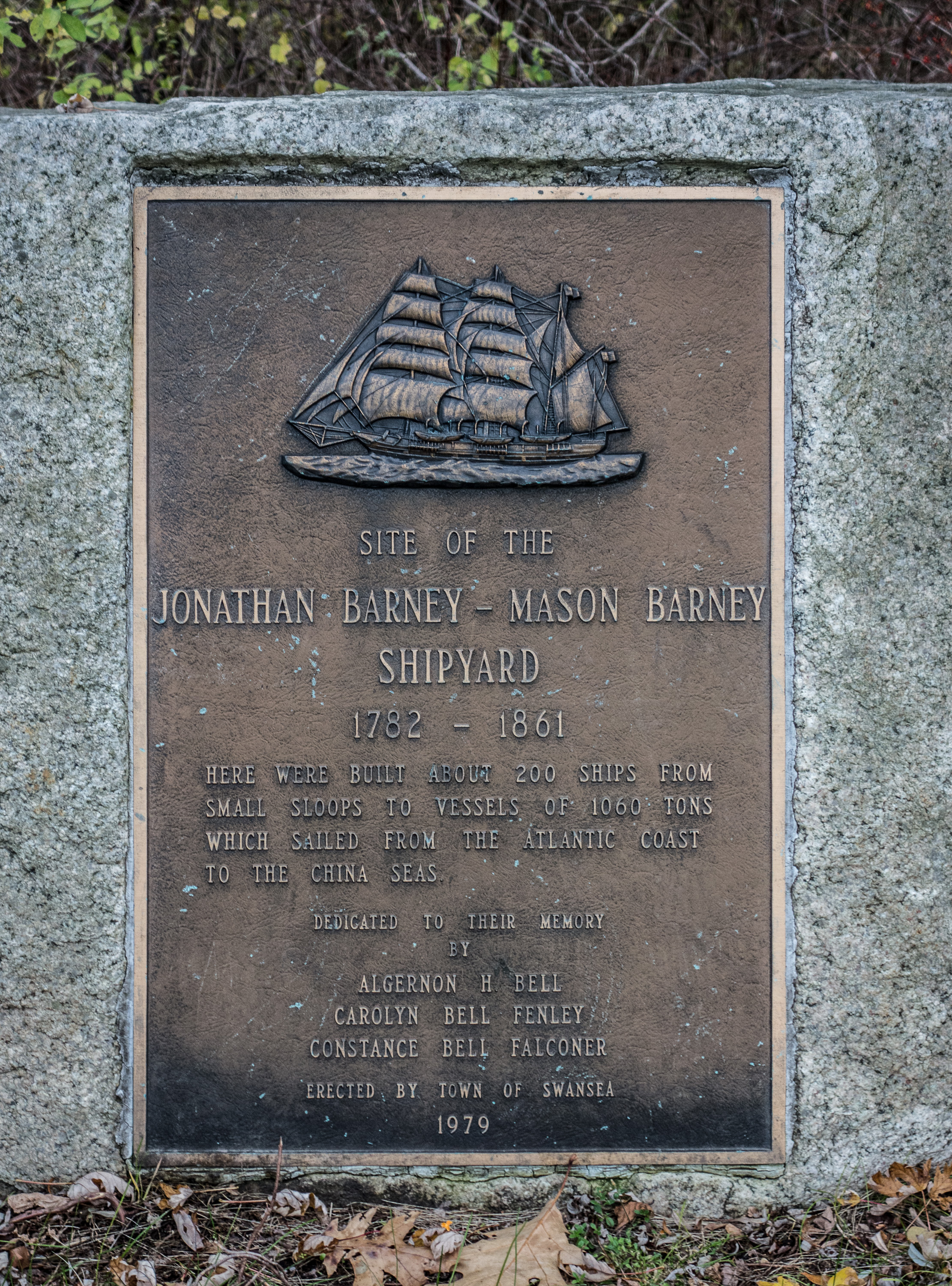
Closeup of the plaque

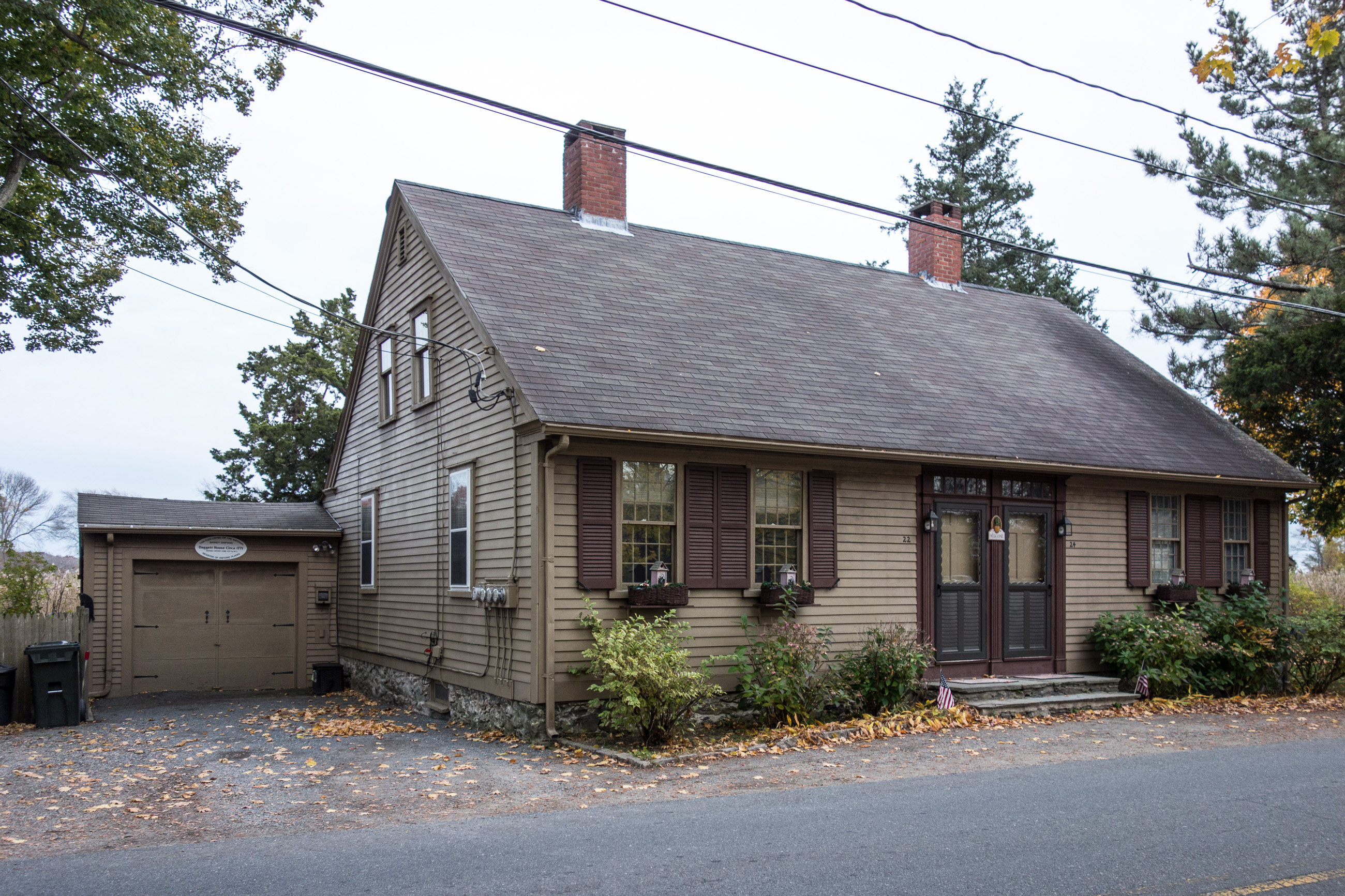
Mason Barney's house on Barneyville Road. Plaque reads "Daggett House circa 1771"

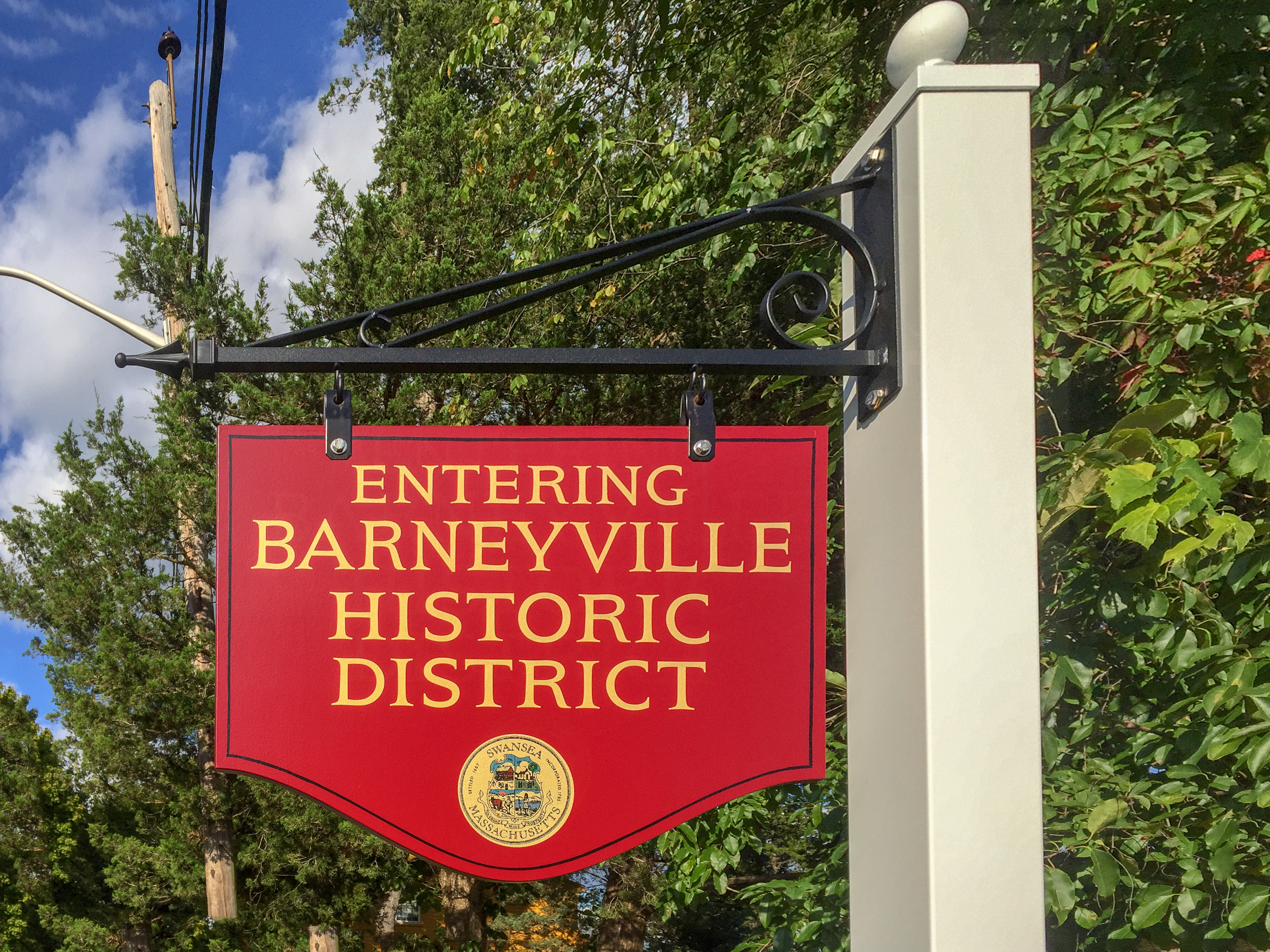
New historic markers were installed in 2018

== See also ==
- National Register of Historic Places listings in Bristol County, Massachusetts
