= Leese =

Leese may refer to:

== People ==
- The Leese family, an English aristocratic family
- Arnold Leese, a late British fascist politician
- Joseph Leese, a late British politician
- Oliver Leese, a late British World War II general
- Richard Leese, a British politician

== Place ==
- Leese, Germany, a municipality in Lower Saxony, Germany

== See also ==
- Lees (disambiguation)
- Lease
- McLeese (disambiguation)
