= Ten Mile River (Seekonk River tributary) =

River in Massachusetts and Rhode Island, United States

Ten Mile River (Seekonk River)
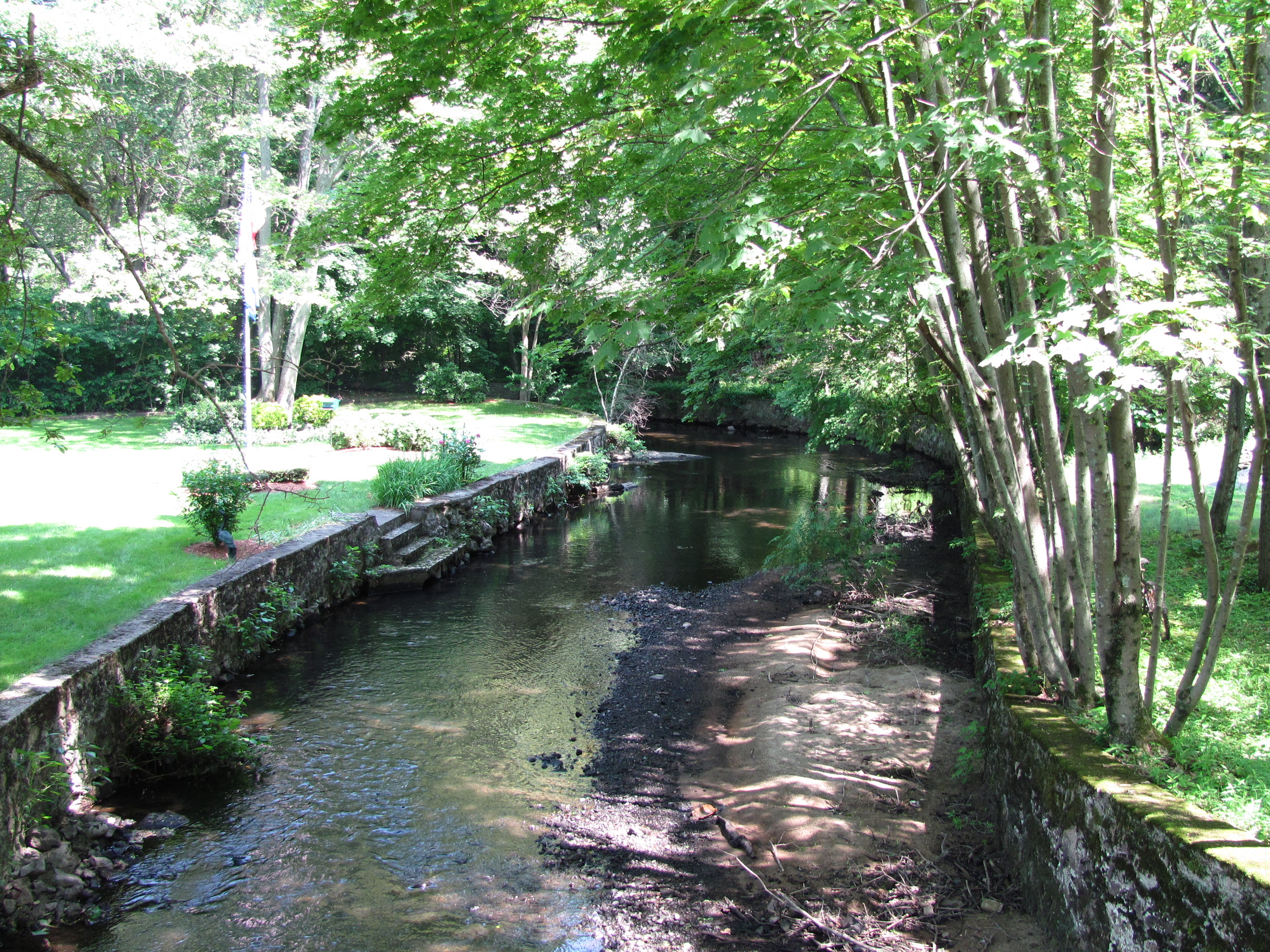
- At Freeman Street in North Attleborough

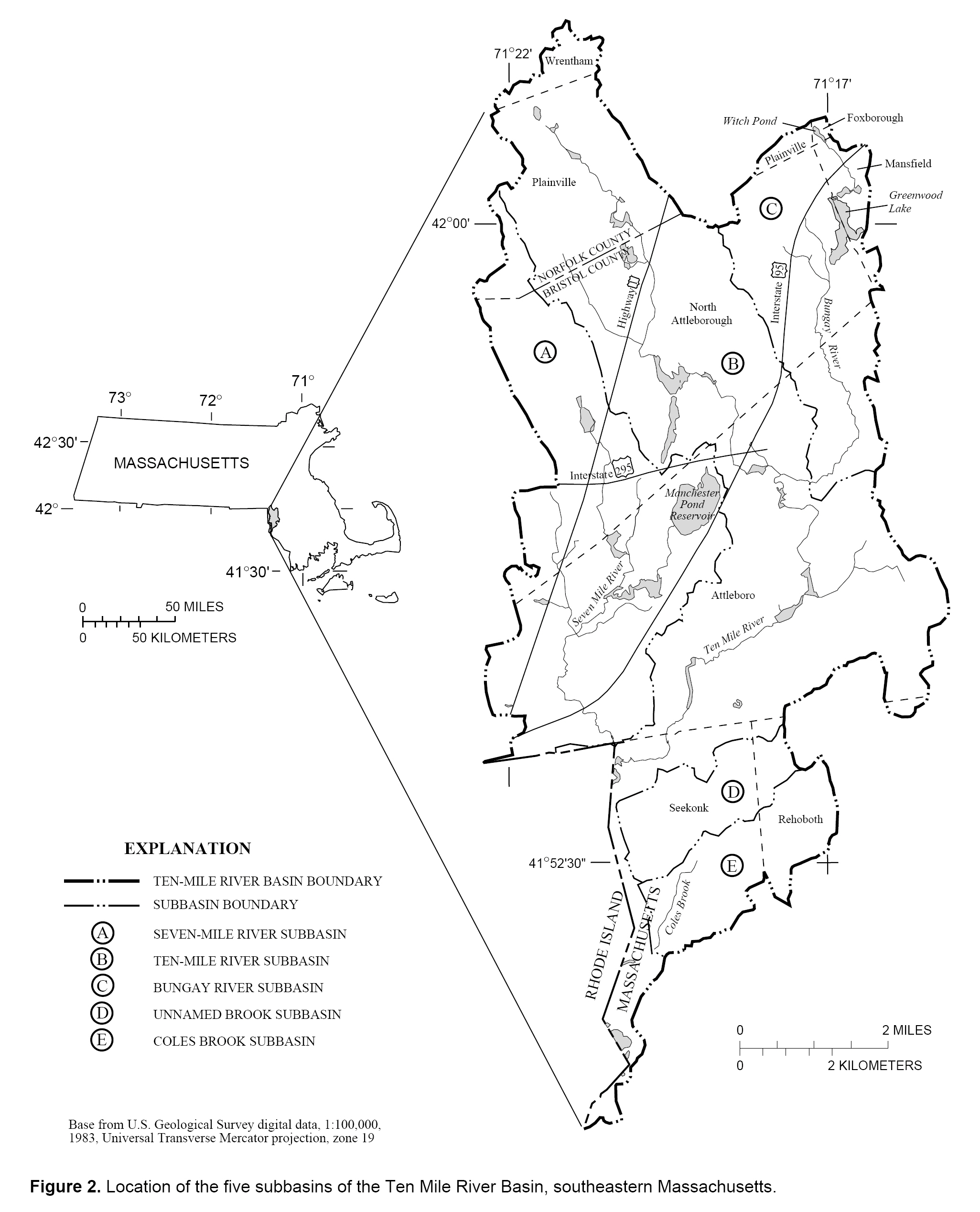
- The Ten Mile River watershed within Massachusetts.

Location
- Country: United States
- State: Rhode Island and Massachusetts
- Counties: Massachusetts: Norfolk and Bristol counties. Rhode Island: Providence County.

Physical characteristics
- Source
  - location: Savage Pond in Plainville, Massachusetts
  - coordinates: 42.0210°N 71.3578°W
- Mouth
  - location: Seekonk River in East Providence, Rhode Island
  - coordinates: 41.8380°N 71.3708°W
- Length: 22 miles (35 km)
- Basin size: 54 square miles (140 km^{2})

Basin features
- River system: Narragansett Bay River System

The Ten Mile River is a river within the U.S. states of Massachusetts and Rhode Island. It flows approximately 22 miles (35 km) and drains a watershed of 54 square miles (140 km^{2}).

The North Attleborough National Fish Hatchery is located in its upper reaches, and the river offers stocked trout fishing in the spring.

The Ten Mile River was badly polluted in the mid 1900s but has subsequently been remediated. Although there are still issues with metals and sediments in the water, the river and nearly all its tributaries are now designated as Class B waters (fishable, swimmable).

== Course ==
The river begins at Savage Pond, near the corner of High and Chestnut Streets, in Plainville, Massachusetts. From there, it flows generally south through North Attleborough, Attleboro and Seekonk before entering Rhode Island and flowing through Pawtucket and East Providence where it flows over the Omega Dam into the Seekonk River.

== Crossings ==
Below is a list of all crossings over the Ten Mile River. The list starts at the headwaters and goes downstream.

- Plainville
  - High Street
  - Fuller Street
  - West Bacon Street
  - Cooney Avenue
- North Attleborough
  - Broad Street
  - North Washington Street
  - Fisher Street
  - East Washington Street (U.S. 1) (Twice)
  - Chestnut Street
  - East Washington Street (U.S. 1)
  - Mount Hope Street
  - Towne Street
  - Freeman Street
  - Clifton Street
  - Cedar Road
- Attleboro
  - Clifton Street
  - Interstate 295
  - Interstate 95
  - West Street
  - Water Street
  - Mechanic Street
  - Hodges Street
  - Riverbank Rd
  - County Street (MA 123)
  - Wall Street
  - Olive Street
  - Lamb Street
  - Thacher Street
  - Tiffany Street
  - Bridge Street
- Seekonk
  - Pond Street
- Pawtucket
  - Central Avenue
  - Armistice Boulevard (RI 15)
- East Providence
  - Newman Avenue (RI 152)
  - Pleasant Street
  - Pawtucket Avenue (U.S. 1A/RI 114)
  - North Broadway
  - Roger Williams Avenue
  - Providence & Worcester Railroad Bridge

== Tributaries ==
In addition to many unnamed tributaries, the following brooks and rivers feed the Ten Mile:

- Blageddy Stream
- Scotts Brook
- Mire Brook
- Rattlesnake Brook
- Bungay River
- Thacher Brook
- North Brook
- South Brook
- Sevenmile River
- Hidden Hollow Brook
- Daggett Farm Brook
- Wilde River
- Coles Brook (not to be confused with Cole River)

== Grassroots organizations ==
- Friends of the Ten Mile River Watershed

== See also ==
- Boston and Providence Railroad Bridge
- List of rivers in Massachusetts
- List of rivers in Rhode Island
- Seekonk River
- Blackstone River
