= Spar Island (Rhode Island) =

Island in Bristol County, Rhode Island, United States

Coordinates: 41.68827°N 71.22033°W

Spar Island is a small sandbar in Mount Hope Bay in eastern Rhode Island. The island is more or less a sand bar, and is made up entirely of an intertidal zone. A small portion is visible at high tide, expanding by about 4 times that size at low tide.
