= Ocean Grove, Massachusetts =

- Census-designated place
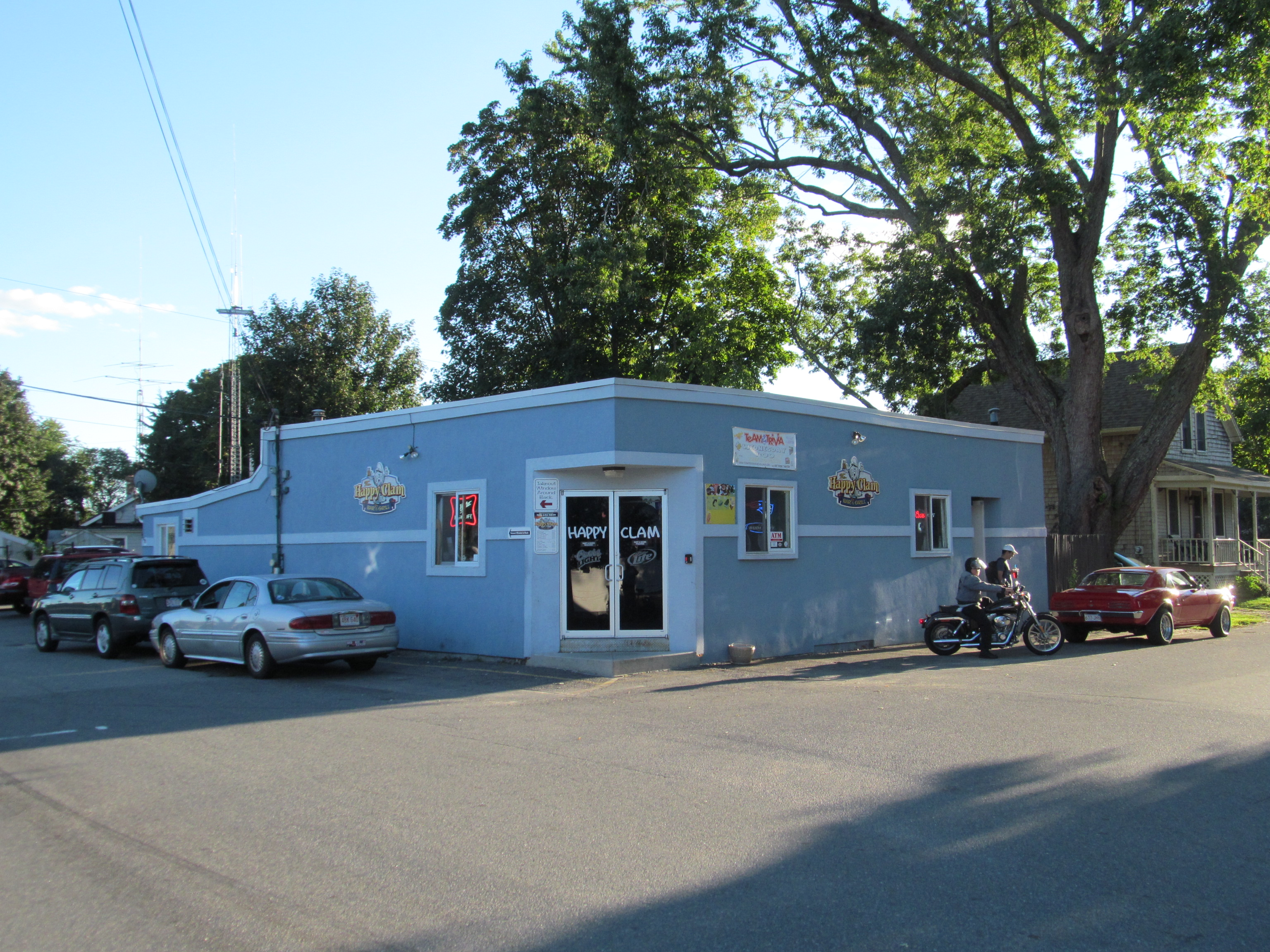
- Happy Clam

- Location in Bristol County in Massachusetts
- Coordinates: 41°43′44″N 71°12′34″W
- Country: United States
- State: Massachusetts
- County: Bristol
- Town: Swansea

Area
  - Total: 0.84 sq mi (2.17 km^{2})
  - Land: 0.66 sq mi (1.71 km^{2})
  - Water: 0.17 sq mi (0.45 km^{2})
- Elevation: 16 ft (5 m)

Population (2020)
  - Total: 2,904
  - Density: 4,388.6/sq mi (1,694.43/km^{2})
- Time zone: UTC-5 (Eastern (EST))
  - Summer (DST): UTC-4 (EDT)
- ZIP Code: 02777 (Swansea)
- FIPS code: 25-50880
- GNIS feature ID: 0612642

Ocean Grove is a census-designated place (CDP) in the town of Swansea in Bristol County, Massachusetts, United States, on the north shore of Mount Hope Bay near the Cole River. The population was 2,811 at the 2010 census, and 2,904 as of the 2020 census.

== Geography ==
Ocean Grove is located at 41°43′44″N 71°12′34″W (41.728751, -71.209365).

According to the United States Census Bureau, the CDP has a total area of 2.1 km^{2} (0.81 mi^{2}) of which 1.7 km^{2} (0.66 mi^{2}) is land and 0.4 km^{2} (0.15 mi^{2}) (18.29%) is water.

== Demographics ==
Historical population
Census	Pop.	Note	%±
2020	2,904		—
U.S. Decennial Census

=== 2020 census ===
As of the 2020 census, Ocean Grove had a population of 2,904. The median age was 46.4 years. 17.7% of residents were under the age of 18 and 20.9% were 65 years of age or older. For every 100 females there were 92.4 males, and for every 100 females age 18 and over there were 91.3 males age 18 and over.

100.0% of residents lived in urban areas, while 0.0% lived in rural areas.

There were 1,259 households, of which 23.7% had children under the age of 18 living in them. Of all households, 43.1% were married-couple households, 19.0% were households with a male householder and no spouse or partner present, and 28.5% were households with a female householder and no spouse or partner present. About 32.1% of all households were made up of individuals and 15.0% had someone living alone who was 65 years of age or older.

There were 1,343 housing units, of which 6.3% were vacant. The homeowner vacancy rate was 1.7% and the rental vacancy rate was 2.3%.

Racial composition as of the 2020 census
Race	Number	Percent
White	2,665	91.8%
Black or African American	30	1.0%
American Indian and Alaska Native	1	0.0%
Asian	22	0.8%
Native Hawaiian and Other Pacific Islander	2	0.1%
Some other race	34	1.2%
Two or more races	150	5.2%
Hispanic or Latino (of any race)	76	2.6%

=== 2010 census ===
At the 2010 census, there were 3,098 people, 1,234 households and 856 families residing in the CDP. The population density was 1,735.7/km^{2} (4,495/sq mi). There were 1,303 housing units at an average density of 750.9/km^{2} (1,945/sq mi). The racial makeup of the CDP was 97.28% White, 0.43% African American, 0.10% Native American, 0.27% Asian, 0.23% from other races and 1.69% from two or more races. Hispanic or Latino of any race were 0.37% of the population.

There were 1,234 households, of which 27.8% had children under the age of 18 living with them, 53.8% were married couples living together, 10.5% had a female householder with no husband present, and 30.6% were non-families. 26.5% of all households were made up of individuals, and 10.7% had someone living alone who was 65 years of age or older. The average household size was 2.44 and the average family size was 2.95.

20.8% of the population were under the age of 18, 7.3% from 18 to 24, 30.2% from 25 to 44, 25.6% from 45 to 64, and 16.1% who were 65 years of age or older. The median age was 40 years. For every 100 females, there were 96.6 males. For every 100 females age 18 and over, there were 90.6 males.

The median household income was $43,527 and the median female income was $50,777. Males had a median income of $36,919 and females $22,875. The per capita income was $20,007. About 6.6% of families and 7.7% of the population were below the poverty line, including 9.6% of those under age 18 and 14.9% of those age 65 or over.
