= Borden Flats Light =

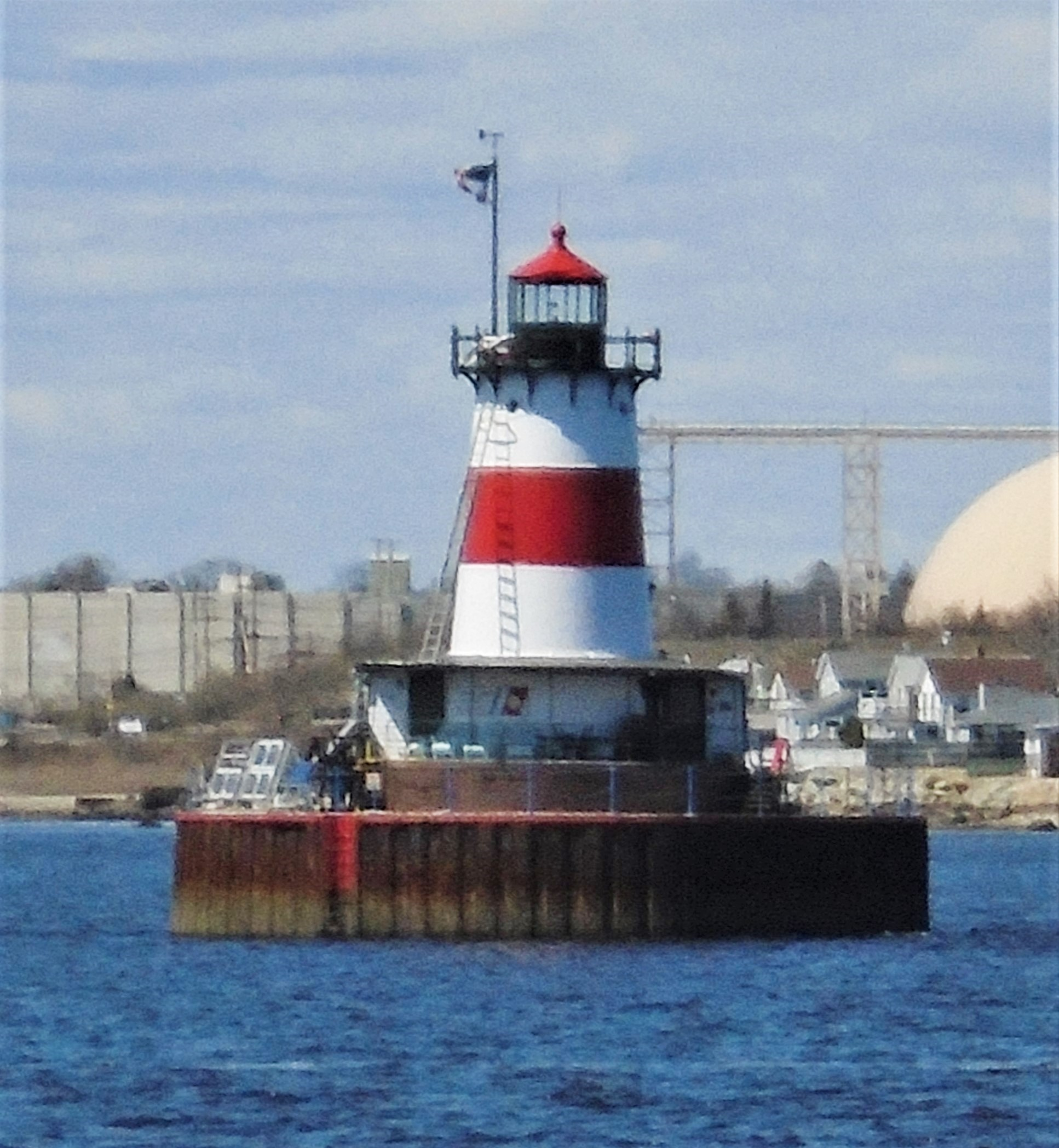
- (2021)
- Location: Taunton River, Fall River, Massachusetts
- Coordinates: 41°42′16.986″N 71°10′27.825″W

Tower
- Constructed: 1881
- Foundation: Cast iron and concrete caisson
- Construction: Cast iron
- Automated: 1963
- Height: 48 feet (15 m)
- Shape: Conical
- Markings: Brown caisson, white body, black lantern
- Heritage: National Register of Historic Places listed place
- Fog signal: Until 1983: Bell; Current: None

Light
- First lit: 1881
- Focal height: 47 feet (14 m)
- Lens: 4th order Fresnel lens (original), 250 millimetres (9.8 in) (current)
- Range: 11 nautical miles (20 km; 13 mi)
- Characteristic: Original: Fixed red Current: Permanently Removed Currently: Flashing LED 2.5 seconds
- Borden Flats Light Station
- U.S. National Register of Historic Places
- Area: 0.1 acres (0.040 ha)
- Built: 1881
- MPS: Lighthouses of Massachusetts TR
- NRHP reference No.: 87001528
- Added to NRHP: June 15, 1987

Borden Flats Light is a historic lighthouse at the mouth of the Taunton River in Somerset, Massachusetts, US. It is a tower-on-caisson type known as a sparkplug lighthouse.

The light was built in 1881, and added to the National Register of Historic Places as Borden Flats Light Station on June 15, 1987, reference number 87001528.

== History ==
By the mid-19th century, the city of Fall River had become a bustling textile-mill town, with regularly scheduled steamboat service to Providence, Rhode Island, Boston and New York City. The city is located at the mouth of the Taunton River where it meets Mount Hope Bay, which is an arm of Narragansett Bay.

Prior to the lighthouse, an unlit day beacon was constructed to mark the spot of a dangerous reef near the center of the relatively shallow Mount Hope Bay. In June 1880, The US Government granted $25,000 for the construction of a new lighthouse on Borden Flats, which consisted of a 50-foot-tall (15 m) cast-iron tower that included a Light Keeper's quarters. The light went into service on October 1, 1881, with a fourth-order Fresnel lens producing a fixed red light 47-foot (14 m) above mean high water. Rainwater was collected in gutters and stored in a cistern in the structure's basement level, providing the Keeper's water supply.

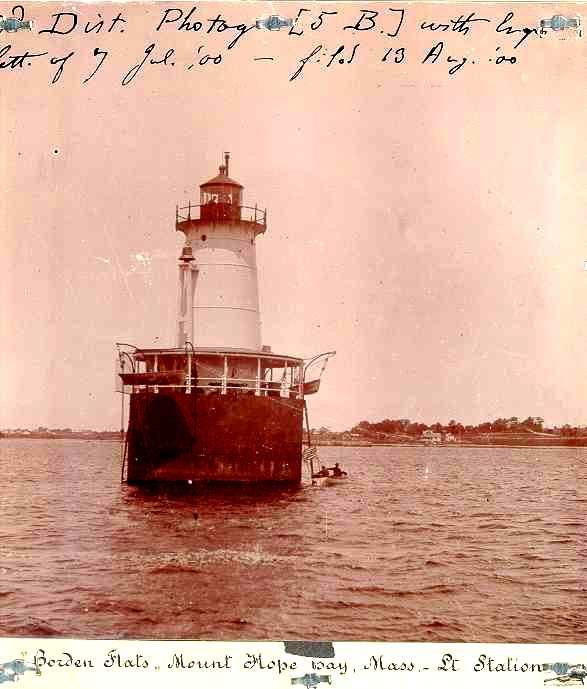
U.S. Coast Guard photo from 1900

The lighthouse, which sits in Mount Hope Bay and open to the south, was battered but survived the Hurricane of 1938. The storm reported pushed the structure approximately 100 ft. north, leaving it with a pronounced 5 degree tilt, which is still noticeable today. In 1963, a new wider caisson was added around the original one for additional protection from any future movement.

In 1957, the lighthouse was electrified. It was automated in 1963. In 1977, its Fresnel lens was removed and replaced with a modern Vega VRB-25 lens. The fog bell remained in use until 1983 when it was replaced by an electronic foghorn. The foghorn was removed in the late 1980's. In 2017, the VRB-25 was replaced by a solar powered, single modern LED fixture, which flashes every 2.5 seconds. The Light was officially named to the National Register of Historic Places in 1987.

Under auspices of the National Historic Lighthouse Preservation Act of 2000, the lighthouse was auctioned privately through the General Services Administration. At auction, the light was purchased by Nick, Cindy, and Craig Korstad of Portland, Oregon. After a 7-year restoration by Nick, he sold the Light to local resident Kevin M. Ferias in 2018, who operates the Overnight Keepers Program, which Korstad established in 2015. The Light is privately owned and maintained by Kevin, and one of only two off-shore caisson lighthouses in the United States open to the public for overnight stays. Overnight guests or "Keepers" can experience the life of a 19th century Light Keeper, with the addition of modern comforts. The Lighthouse's 5 floors, adorned with antiques and lighthouse memorabilia, include a 1st floor kitchenette, half-bath, and dining area, 2nd floor living room, 3rd floor Den/TV room, 4th floor queen-sized bedroom and the 5th level lantern room with 360 degrees views of Mount Hope Bay, Braga Bridge and the city of Fall River. The lighthouse is accessed by a 3 minute boat ride from nearby Borden Flats Marina, only 1500 ft. to its east.

== See also ==
- National Register of Historic Places listings in Fall River, Massachusetts
