= Sarah A. McClees =

American temperance worker

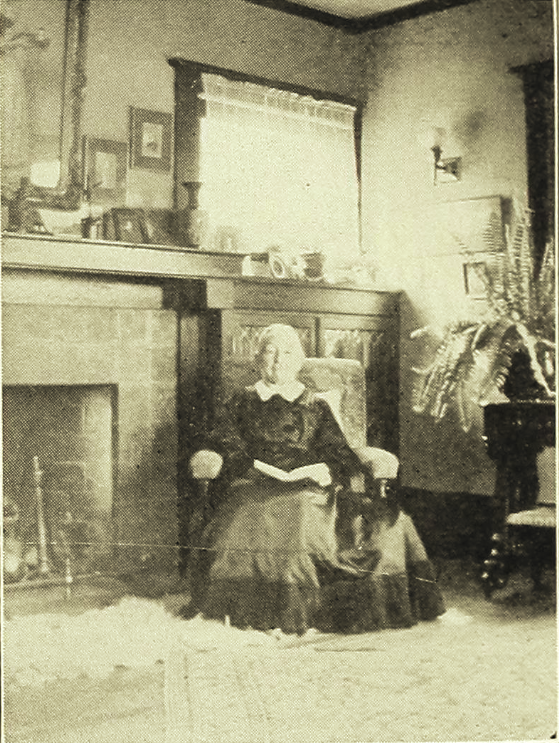
- Sarah A. McClees, from a 1911 publication
- Born: Sarah A. Clark; September 23, 1822; Wilmington, Delaware
- Died: January 7, 1913 (age 90); Oakland, California
- Occupation(s): Temperance worker, suffragist, writer

Sarah A. Clark McClees (September 23, 1822 – January 7, 1913) was an American temperance worker, suffragist, and writer. She was superintendent of the Department of Soldiers and Sailors of the National Woman's Christian Temperance Union (WCTU).

== Early life ==
Sarah Clark was born in Wilmington, Delaware.

== Career ==
McClees was at the first national convention of the WCTU, in Cleveland in 1874. She was the first superintendent of the Department of Soldiers and Sailors of the National Woman's Christian Temperance Union (WCTU). Her department published a periodical, America's Defenders, encouraging servicemen to abstain from alcohol, and presenting them with other recreational outlets. She promoted book drives to supply military bases and ships with books and magazines, opened a coffeehouse in New York City, and led the WCTU's efforts to end a federal program to sell liquor to the residents of disabled veterans' homes.

McClees also chaired the WCTU's Lyceum Bureau, scheduling lecturers on temperance topics, and was active in the Oakland chapter of the WCTU. She founded one of the first branches of the Young Women's Christian Association (YWCA), in New York City. She founded a rescue mission for girls in Oakland, California.

McClees worked for women's suffrage. She registered to vote in California when she was ninety years old, and the last time she left home was to vote in Oakland in 1912. She was a member of the Southern California Press Association.

== Publications ==
- "Soldiers and Sailors" (1894), report in the minutes of the annual meeting of the Women's Christian Temperance Union
- The Army Canteen: A History of the Pioneer Work of Women with Regard to the Canteen in the Military Service of the United States of America (1905)

== Personal life ==
Clark married iron manufacturer William Kennard McClees. They had a son, Edward, and two daughters, Mary and Helen. Another son, Herbert, died in infancy. Her husband died in 1887, and she died in 1913, at the age of 90, at her daughter's home in Oakland.
