= Lees Hotel =

Pub with No Beer in Queensland

Coordinates: 18.6501°S 146.1545°E

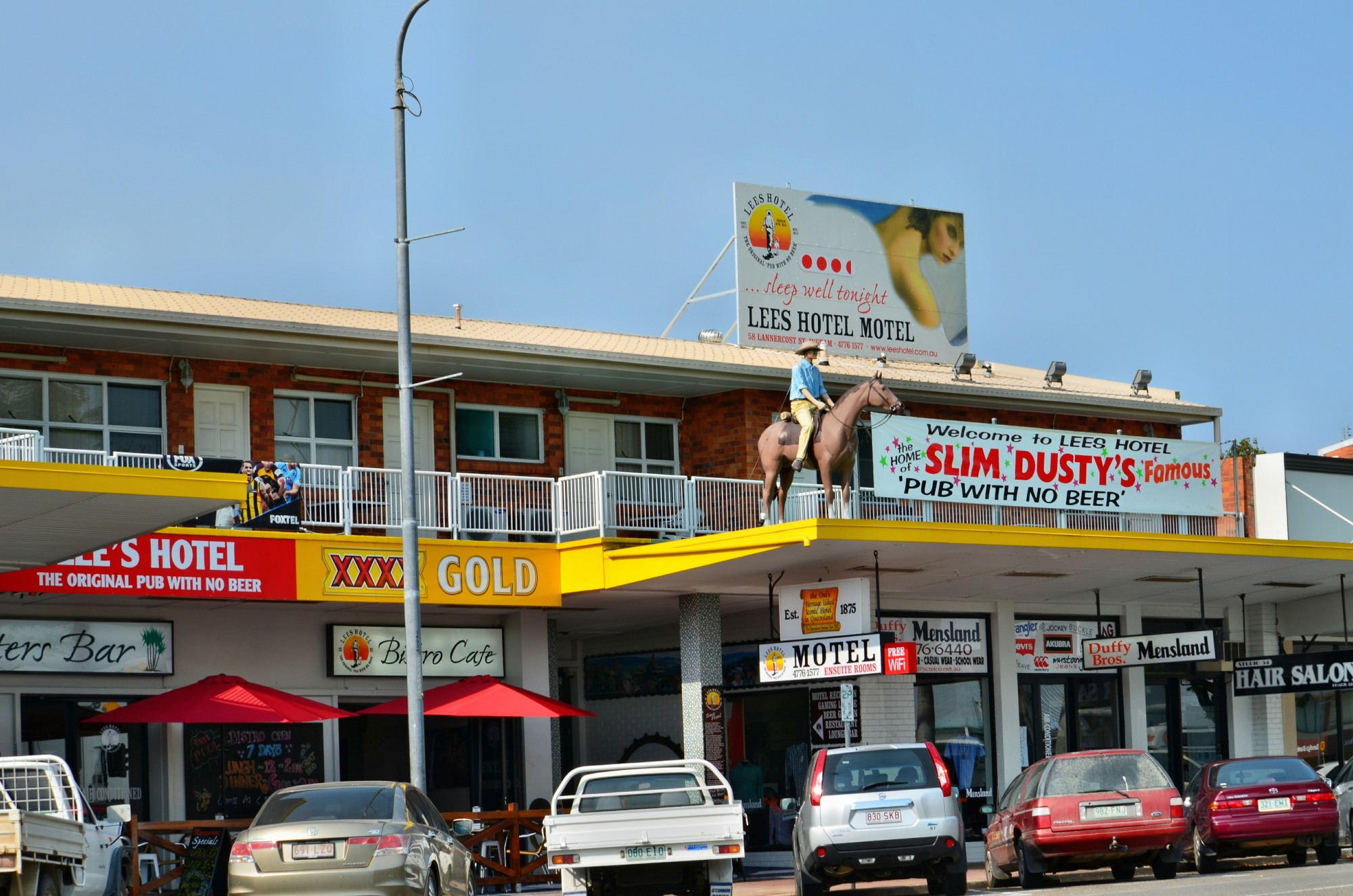
Lees Hotel, Ingham, is recognised as standing on the site of the original Pub With No Beer, made famous by Slim Dusty's song.

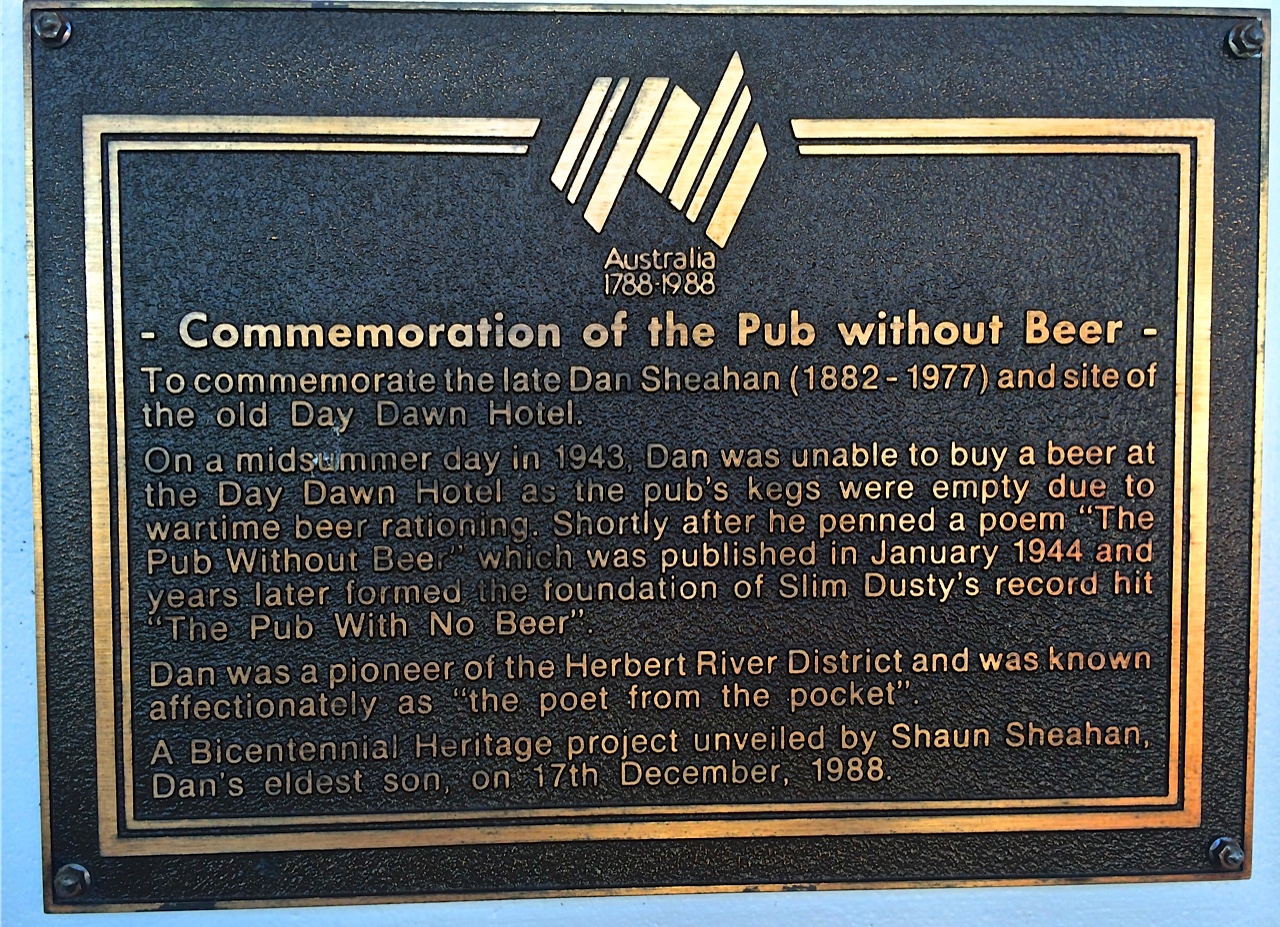
A Queensland Government commemorative plaque was erected on the site of the Day Dawn Hotel in 1986.

Lees Hotel in Ingham, Queensland, a Queensland icon, is recognised as the standing on the site of official Pub with No Beer made famous by Slim Dusty's song "A Pub with No Beer". The 1957 song, which became Australia's first international hit, was based on the poem A Pub Without Beer written by Ingham sugarcane farmer and poet Dan Sheahan in the Day Dawn Hotel, in Ingham in 1943.

== History ==
In December 1943, American servicemen from the 22nd Bomb Group passed through Ingham en route to Port Moresby, stopped at the Day Dawn Hotel overnight and drank all the beer. The following day Dan Sheahan rode his horse 30 kilometres to the hotel only to learn there was no beer. He had a glass of wine instead, sat in the pub and wrote the poem.

The poem was published in The North Queensland Register in early 1944 and was rewritten in 1956 by Gordon Parsons, who set it to music for Slim Dusty. Parsons said he did not know where the original poem came from, but when Slim Dusty visited Ingham, he met Dan Sheahan and was shown the original poem, which Slim acknowledged as being the origin of the song. Dan Sheahan didn't want any royalties for the song, only recognition. He went on to write three other songs for Slim.

The Day Dawn Hotel replaced the Telegraph Hotel, which was built on the site in the late 1800s. In 1960 Lees Hotel was built on the site of the demolished Day Dawn Hotel which had ceased trading years earlier.

== Recognition ==
Controversy surrounded the identity of the hotel when a pub in New South Wales claimed to be the original pub where the song was created, but in his autobiography Walk a Country Mile, Slim Dusty confirmed the original poem was created in the Day Dawn Hotel in Ingham.

In 1986, The Australian Bicentennial Heritage and Environment Program gave recognition to the site of the old Day Dawn Hotel as the location of the official Pub with No Beer and acknowledged Dan Sheahan as the author of the poem. A Queensland Government committee visited Ingham and erected a plaque of recognition on Lannercost St.

== Festival ==
A Pub with No Beer Festival was held in April 2013 at Lees to commemorate the 70th anniversary of the event.

== 2012 refurbishment ==
Lees Hotel underwent a million-dollar refurbishment in 2012 and now includes artifacts, photographic history and memorabilia of Ingham's early days as well as a tribute to Dan Sheahan and Slim Dusty.
