= Lee's Crossing =

Subdivision of suburban Atlanta, United States

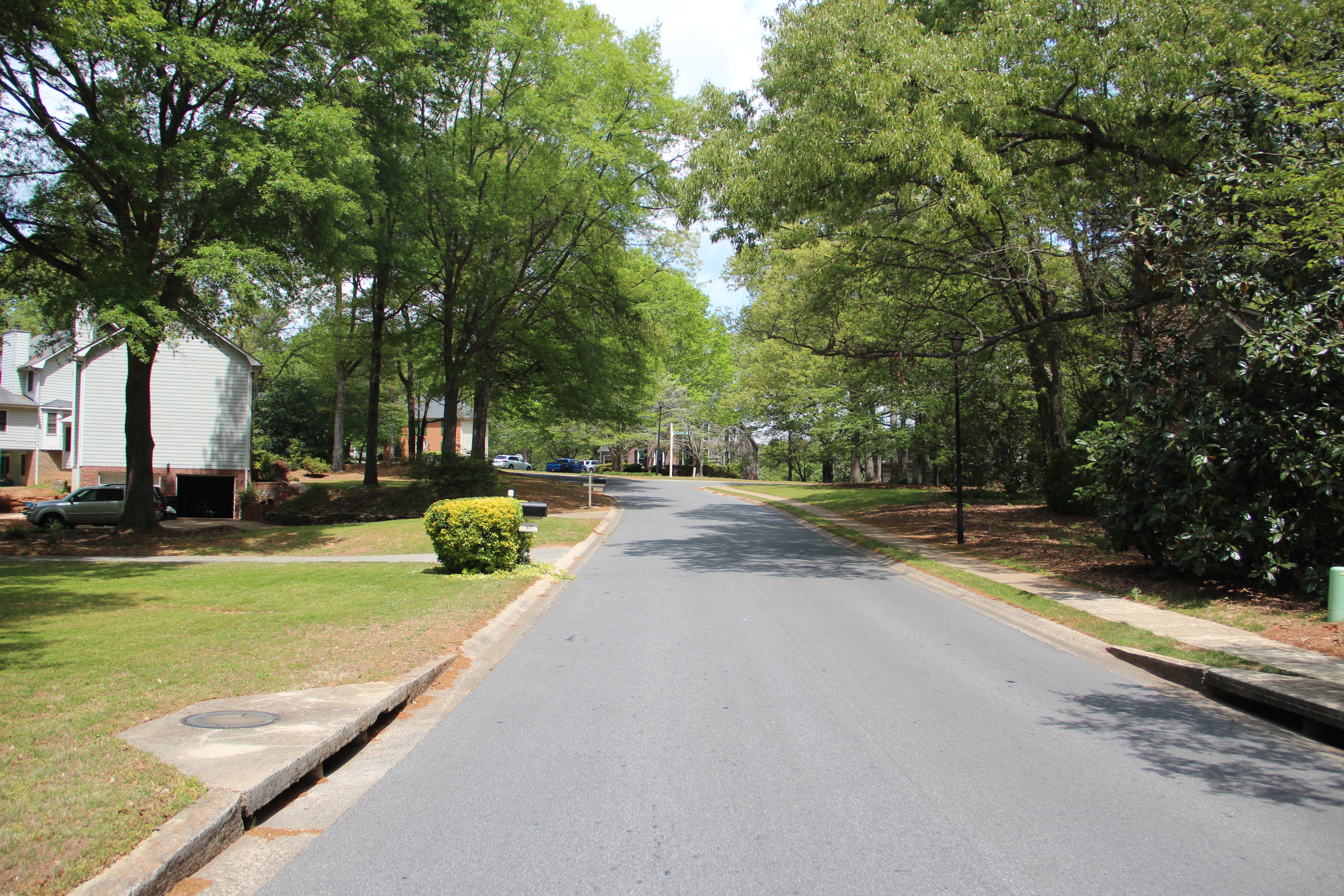
A street inside Lee's Crossing

Lee's Crossing, Marietta, Georgia, is a subdivision in suburban Atlanta. It is located in the western part the City of Marietta in Cobb County, off Manning Road (about 1.5 miles west of The Marietta Square).

== Subdivision ==
Lee's Crossing is a large subdivision with 409 single family homes. It is a swim & tennis community with a homeowners' association. It is within walking distance to A.L. Burruss Elementary School and Marietta High School. The subdivision is within a short drive of Laurel Park and Kennesaw Mountain National Battlefield Park, as several properties towards the back of the subdivision border parts of the national park.

== Schools ==
Lee's Crossing is in the Marietta City Schools District (separate from Cobb County Schools)

Elementary school: A.L. Burruss Elementary Middle school: Marietta Middle school High school: Marietta High School

== History ==
Lee's Crossing sits on the former Manning Farm, owned by the family for over 100 years. During the civil war the Smith-Manning House was headquarters for Gen. William J. Hardee and also served as a hospital. In the late 1970s The Manning estate and Cousins Properties came together to develop the subdivision. From the beginning construction, through more recent years, three different developers built there.

Both A.L. Burruss Elementary and Marietta High School sit on what once was part of the Manning Farm. Since then the remaining Manning Farm property has undergone construction of two new subdivisions, Rockford Commons and Rockford Township. One bordering Lee's Crossing and one directly across the main entrance.
