= Mount Hope Bay =

Tidal estuary in the U.S. states of Massachusetts and Rhode Island

Coordinates: 41°41′N 71°13′W

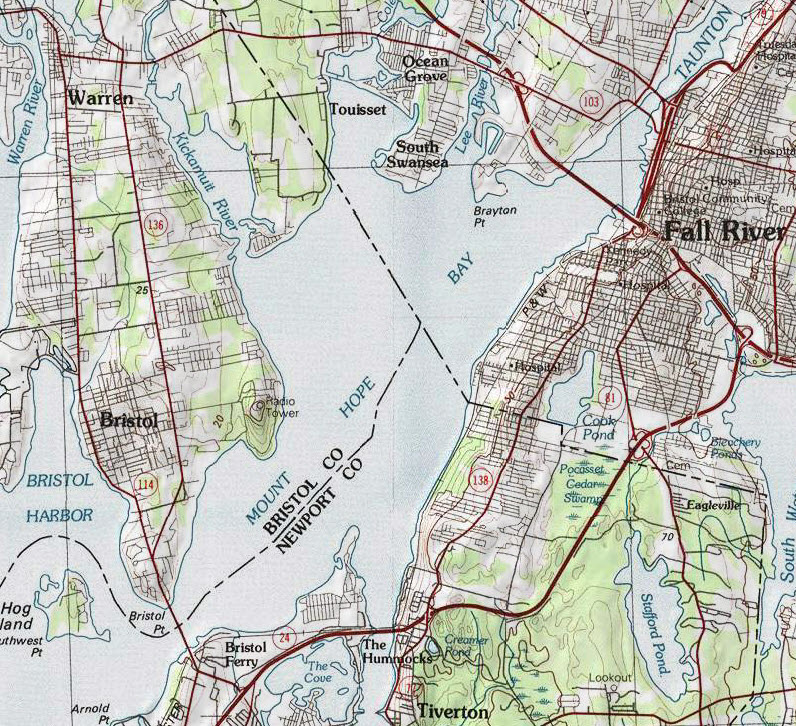
Map of Mount Hope Bay

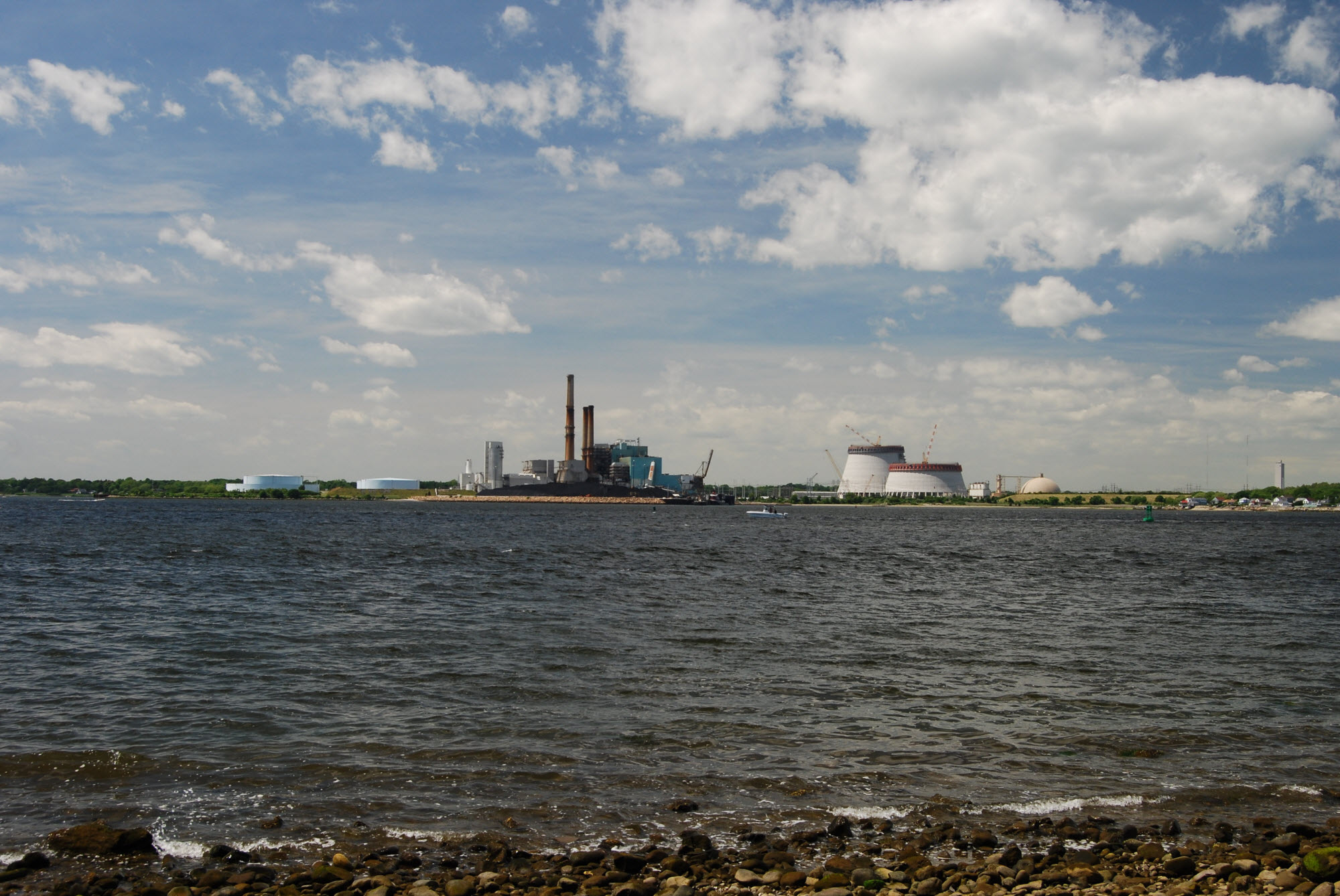
View of Mount Hope Bay and Brayton Point Power Station from Fall River, Massachusetts, June 2010

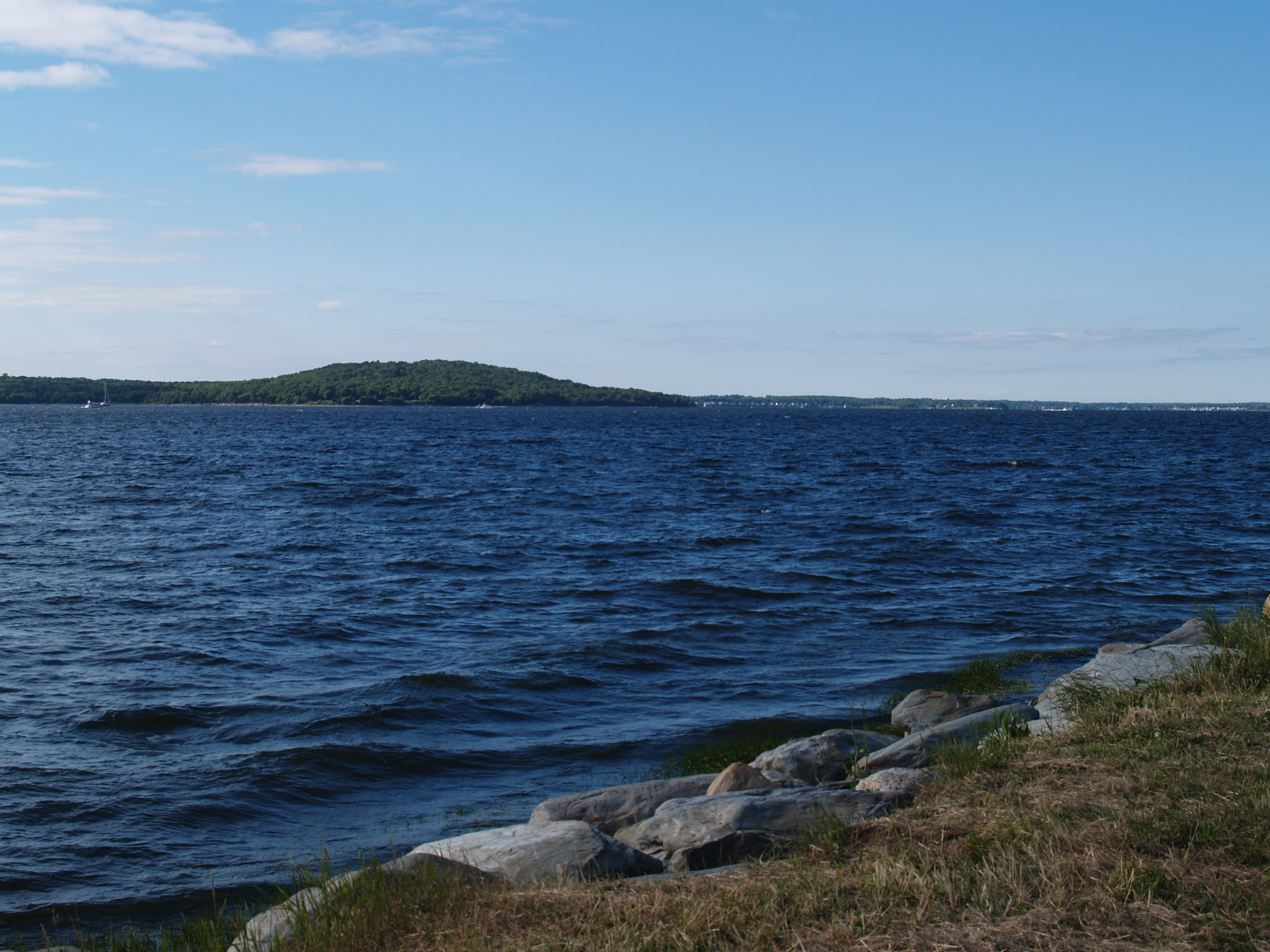
View of Mount Hope Bay from Common Fence Point, Portsmouth, Rhode Island. Mount Hope (Montaup) is the small hill across the bay in Bristol, Rhode Island

Mount Hope Bay is a tidal estuary located at the mouth of the Taunton River on the Massachusetts and Rhode Island border. It is an arm of Narragansett Bay. The bay is named after Mount Hope, a small hill located on its western shore in what is now Bristol, Rhode Island. It flows into the East Passage of Narragansett Bay and also the Sakonnet River. Mount Hope Bay has played an important role to the history of the area, from pre-colonial times to the present. While many years of sewage and industrial pollution have severely degraded the quality of the shallow waters of the bay, there are currently major efforts underway to clean up and restore it.

== Geography ==
Mount Hope Bay is part of the Narragansett Basin, formed as a rift in the Avalon terrane. It is underlaid by sedimentary rocks estimated to be several miles thick. The bay covers an area of about 13 square miles (36 square km), with an average depth of 18.7 feet, although portions of the southern end of the bay are as deep as 74 feet near the Mount Hope Bridge.

At the north end of the bay are the towns of Warren, Rhode Island, Swansea, Massachusetts, and Somerset, Massachusetts. The eastern shore of the bay consists of the city of Fall River, Massachusetts and the town of Tiverton, Rhode Island. Portsmouth, Rhode Island is located at the southern end of the bay at the northern tip of Aquidneck Island. Bristol, Rhode Island forms the western shore of the bay.

Approximately 70 percent of the bay is located within Rhode Island. However, nearly 90 percent of its drainage area is located within Massachusetts. Its main tributary is the Taunton River, and several smaller rivers drain directly into the bay, including the Quequechan River, Lee's River, Cole River, and Kickemuit River. A small sand bar known as Spar Island is located in the middle of the bay just south of the Rhode Island border.

The perimeter of the bay is crossed by three roadway bridges: the Sakonnet River Bridge to the southeast, the Charles M. Braga Jr. Memorial Bridge to the north, and the Mount Hope Bridge to the southwest.

Mount Hope Bay contains a 35 foot-deep shipping channel maintained by the Army Corps of Engineers as part of their Fall River Harbor project. A privately maintained, 34 feet-deep channel extends from the main ACOE channel to the Brayton Point Power Station.

== History ==
Mount Hope Bay was once part of the Wampanoag Nation, and the site of early events of King Philip's War in 1675.

For nearly 200 years, the area of the bay was part of a boundary dispute between the states of Rhode Island and Massachusetts, which was finally settled by the United States Supreme Court in 1862.

Mount Hope Bay has played an important part in the industrial history of the city of Fall River, which is located on its eastern shore. The bay provides access to the city for ocean-going vessels, including for many years the passenger ships of the Fall River Line.

In the 1960s, the 1,500 megawatt Brayton Point Power Station was built by the New England Power Company in Somerset, Massachusetts at the north end of the bay. It has the largest capacity of any power plant in New England. For many years, the plant has relied on the waters of the bay as part of its cooling process. This has led to severe thermal pollution, resulting in periodic fish kills. After years of lawsuits and various environmental government action, current owner Dominion Resources spent approximately $500 million building two 500-foot tall cooling towers and upgrading the cooling system to prevent pollution of the bay. The plant closed in 2017 and cooling towers were demolished in April 2019.

The power station brownfield was purchased in 2018 and became the Brayton Point Commerce Center. It was upgraded and adapted it into offshore wind port which can support heavy-lift port operations and receive deep-draft vessels.

In 2009, the City of Fall River completed the first phase of a $185 million Combined Sewer Overflow (CSO) abatement project, designed to drastically reduce the amount of sewage overflows that occur during periods of heavy rains. The project is expected to be completed by 2018.

== See also ==
- Battleship Cove
- Borden Flats Light
- Fall River Heritage State Park
- Mount Hope Farm
- Ocean Grove, Massachusetts
