= Lees (given name) =

Lees is a masculine given name which may refer to:

- Lees Knowles (1857–1928), British barrister, military historian and politician
- Lees Radcliffe (1865–1928), English cricketer
- Lees Whitehead (1864–1913), English cricketer
