= Cole River =

River in Bristol County, Massachusetts, US

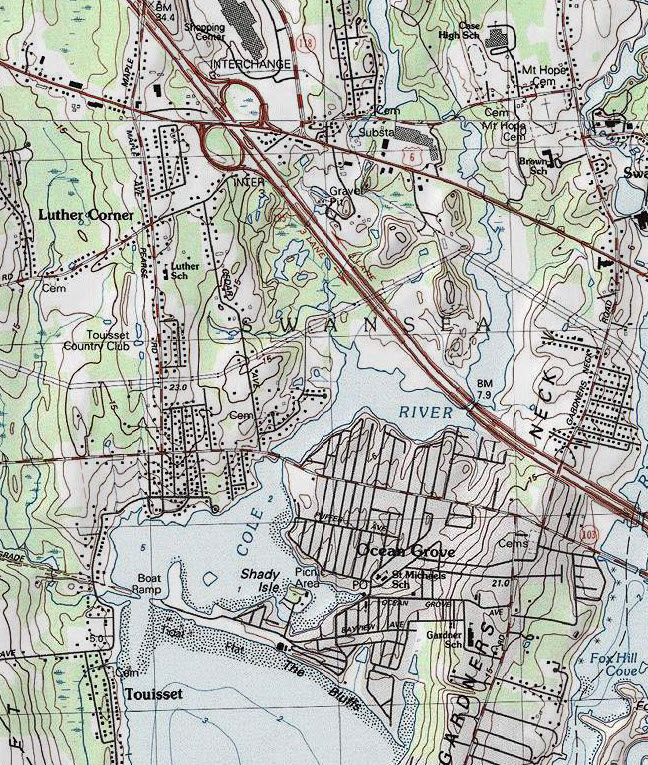
Map of Cole River showing the tidal portion near the village of Ocean Grove

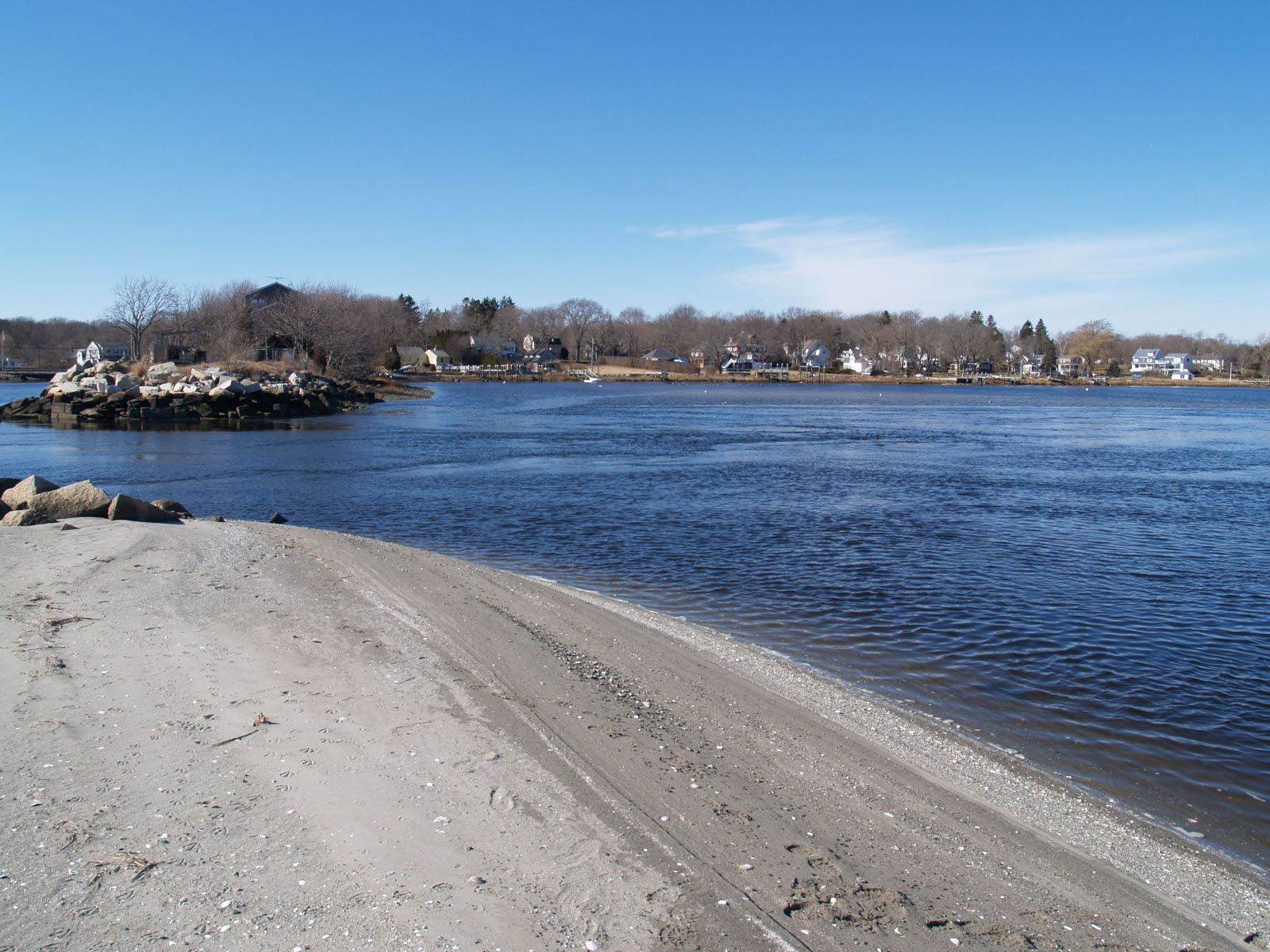
View of Cole River from Ocean Grove

The Cole River is located in Bristol County, Massachusetts. It flows 11.8 miles (19.0 km) from its headwaters in Dighton, Massachusetts, through the towns of Rehoboth and Swansea into Mount Hope Bay, an arm of Narragansett Bay. The Cole River becomes tidal after crossing under the G.A.R. Highway (U.S. Route 6) in Swansea.

== Named tributaries ==
- Cole Brook (from Rehoboth, Massachusetts)

== Crossings ==
in Dighton, Massachusetts:

- Wellington Street
- Cedar Street

in Swansea, Massachusetts:

- Lewis Street
- Baker Street
- Hortonville Road
- Wood Street
- Milford Street
- G.A.R. Highway (U.S. Route 6)
- Interstate 195
- Route 103

== See also ==
- Coles Brook, a short stream in nearby Seekonk, Massachusetts
- Ocean Grove, Massachusetts
