= Lees River =

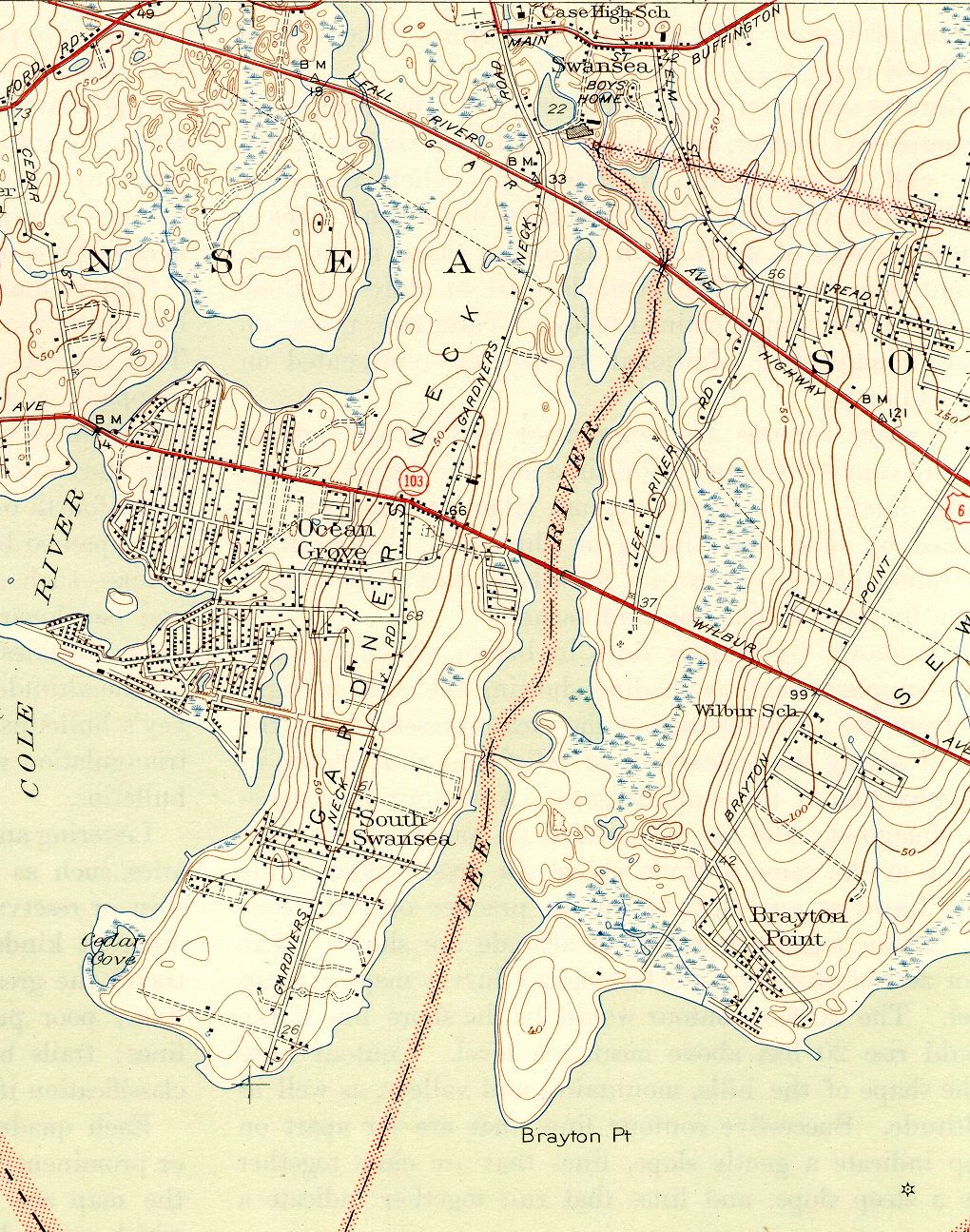
- Lees River and environs

Location
- Country: United States
- State: Massachusetts
- County: Bristol County

Physical characteristics
- Source
  - coordinates: 41.7436°N 71.1891°W
- Mouth
  - location: Mount Hope Bay
  - coordinates: 41.7197°N 71.1957°W
- Length: 2.9 mi (4.7 km)

The Lees River or Lee's River, shown on federal maps as the Lee River, is a 2.9-mile-long (4.7 km) tidal river that forms part of the boundary between Swansea and Somerset, Massachusetts. It flows south to drain into Mount Hope Bay.

The first documented local shipyard was established on the river between 1707 and 1712 by Samuel Lee. Today the river is designated as a Class A, "outstanding resource" water.
