= Coles Brook =

River in Massachusetts, United States

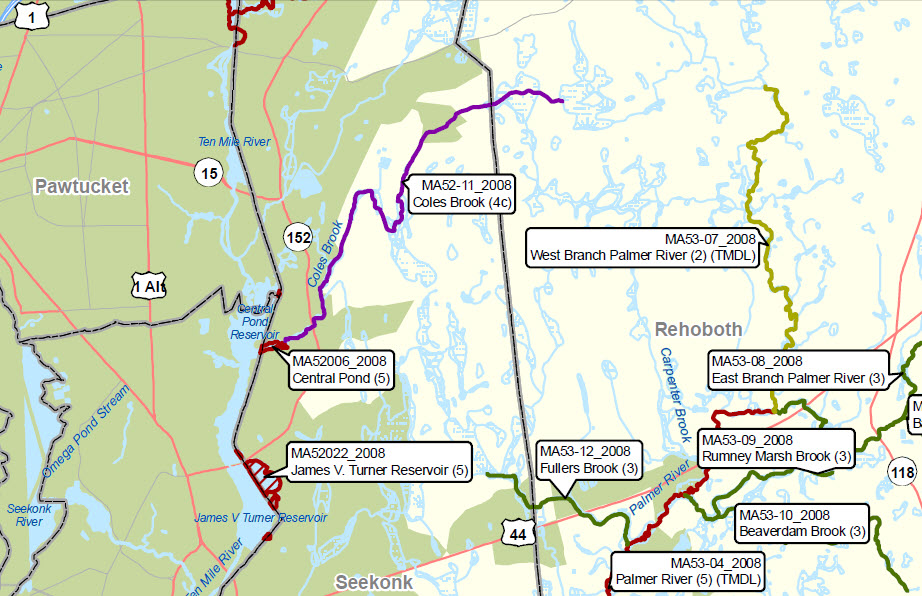
Map of Coles Brook and surrounding area

Coles Brook is a small stream that begins east of Pine Street in Rehoboth, Massachusetts, and flows in a southwest direction to Central Pond and the James V. Turner Reservoir and the on the border of Seekonk, Massachusetts, and East Providence, Rhode Island. It is a tributary of the Ten Mile River.

The brook is about 4.4 miles (7.1 km) long and has three small dams along its course. It flows through the Caratunk wildlife reservation in Seekonk, which has large portions of open space and wildlife, and is the site of Native American Camps, where artifacts have been uncovered.

The Coles Brook is on the EPA list of impaired waterways, due to pathogens, although it has still been rated a Class B waterway, fishable and swimmable.

== Tributaries ==
Dry Brook, Cascading Brook, and Muskrat Brook are the only tributaries of the Coles River, though it has several streams that also feed it.

== Crossings ==
Below is a list of all crossings over the Coles Brook. The list starts at the headwaters and goes downstream.

- Rehoboth
  - Homestead Avenue
  - Sweeney Road
- Seekonk
  - Pine Street
  - Fairway Drive
  - Tompson Drive
  - Newman Avenue (MA 152)
