= Swansea, Massachusetts =

- Town
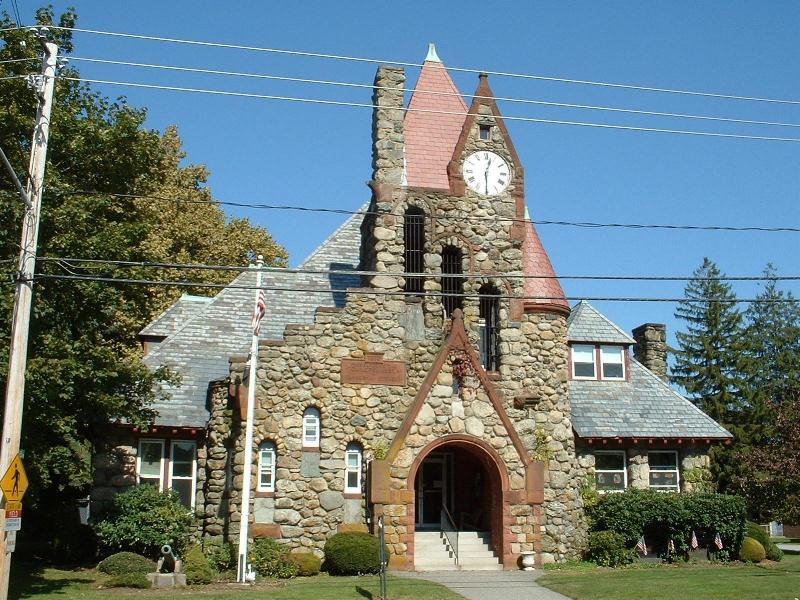
- Swansea Town Hall

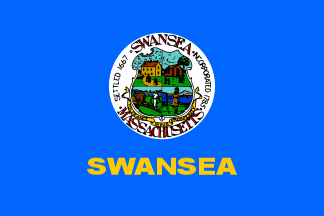
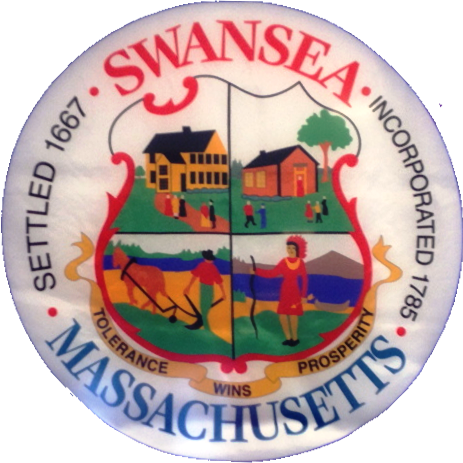
- Flag Seal

- Location in Bristol County in Massachusetts
- Coordinates: 41°44′53″N 71°11′25″W
- Country: United States
- State: Massachusetts
- County: Bristol
- Settled: 1662
- Incorporated: March 5, 1667

Government
  - Type: Open town meeting

Area
  - Total: 25.5 sq mi (66.1 km^{2})
  - Land: 23.1 sq mi (59.7 km^{2})
  - Water: 2.5 sq mi (6.4 km^{2})
- Elevation: 23 ft (7 m)

Population (2020)
  - Total: 17,144
  - Density: 744/sq mi (287/km^{2})
- Time zone: UTC-5 (Eastern)
  - Summer (DST): UTC-4 (Eastern)
- ZIP code: 02777
- Area code: 508 / 774
- FIPS code: 25-68750
- GNIS feature ID: 0619439
- Website: www.swanseama.gov

Swansea is a town in Bristol County in southeastern Massachusetts, United States. It is located at the mouth of the Taunton River, just west of Fall River, 47 miles (76 km) south of Boston, and 12 miles (19 km) southeast of Providence, Rhode Island. The population was 17,144 at the 2020 census. The villages of Hortonville, Barneyville and Ocean Grove are located in the town.

Swansea is a part of the South Coast region of Massachusetts which encompasses the cities and towns that surround Buzzards Bay (excluding the Elizabeth Islands, Bourne and Falmouth), Mount Hope Bay and the Sakonnet River.

== History ==
Swansea was named after the Welsh city of Swansea, which had been the hometown of some original settlers. John Miles, the founder of the first Baptist Church in Wales, moved to Swansea c. 1662. William Brenton had purchased the land from Native Americans. Parts of its territory were originally part of Rehoboth, Massachusetts.

In 1667 the first Baptist church in Massachusetts relocated to Swansea from Rehoboth after experiencing religious intolerance there, and Swansea was incorporated as an independent town. Initially, the town established a committee to assign rank of 1, 2, or 3 to the residents with the first getting 3 acres of land, the second 2, and the third 1. The committee could promote and demote residents as it saw fit. The system collapsed in 1681 when the committee voted to make five residents the highest rank and to make the rank hereditary. The town unanimously voted to abolish the system.

On June 20, 1675, the first Native American attack of King Philip's War had all 70 settlers confined to their stockade. The attack had taken place at the Miles Garrison, near the Palmer River. By June 25 the entire town had been burned, although a handful of the colonists escaped to Taunton. When the active war ended in 1676, the town was soon rebuilt. The Miles (or Myles) Garrison stood the test of time, but was demolished in the 1970s. The plot it was on remains overgrown, free from construction, and a commemorative marker was placed there by the Commonwealth of Massachusetts in 1912.

After the war, many small industries, such as forges, ironworks and fisheries, opened up in the town. Many would later leave, and there remains a large agricultural sector.

What is now Barrington, Rhode Island (part of Massachusetts until 1747) was separated from the rest of Swansea in 1717, over religious differences.

In the late 1890s, trolleys connected the town to Providence, Fall River and Taunton, and the town has retained a suburban residential feel. Today Swansea is well known for its retail areas.

Swansea gained national attention in 1985 when Mark Hoyle, a young hemophiliac who had contracted AIDS through a blood transfusion, was allowed to attend public schools by Jack McCarthy, Superintendent of Schools. It was the first time in the U.S. that a student known to have the disease was allowed to enter public schools. The case came to national attention around the same time as that of Ryan White in Indiana, and helped many children with HIV attend schools throughout the country. Hoyle died one year later, and a new elementary school was named in his honor.

== Geography ==
The town has a total area of 25.5 square miles (66 km^{2}), of which 23.1 square miles (60 km^{2}) is land and 2.5 square miles (6.5 km^{2}), or 9.67%, is water. The town is bordered by Dighton on the northeast, Somerset on the east, Mount Hope Bay on the south, Warren, Rhode Island, on the southwest, Barrington, Rhode Island, on the west, and Seekonk and Rehoboth to the north. Part of the town's border with Somerset is made up of the Lees River. The Cole, Kickemuit and Palmer rivers also pass through the town on their way south to Mount Hope Bay (for the Kickemuit, Cole and Lees rivers) and Narragansett Bay (for the Palmer). The entire town is a part of the Narragansett Bay watershed area. The town's neighborhoods include Barneyville, North Swansea, Swansea Village, Birch Swamp Corner, Hortonville, Luther Corner, South Swansea, Touissett, Ocean Grove, and Smokerise. Swansea is 12 miles (19 km) southeast of Providence and 47 miles (76 km) south of Boston.

Much of the town's retail businesses are located along the highways, with the area around the junction of U.S. Route 6 and Massachusetts Route 118 where the former Swansea Mall was located. Just north of the mall are several office complexes), doctor's offices and other offices. The area along Route 103 between the Lees River and the Cole River is also an area for retail, with many smaller businesses lining the road.

Outside of the retail area (as well as the densely populated neighborhoods of Ocean Grove, South Swansea and Smokerise), much of the area is rural.

== Demographics ==
Historical population
Year	Pop.	±%
1790	1,784	—
1850	1,554	−12.9%
1860	1,430	−8.0%
1870	1,294	−9.5%
1880	1,355	+4.7%
1890	1,456	+7.5%
1900	1,645	+13.0%
1910	1,978	+20.2%
1920	2,334	+18.0%
1930	3,941	+68.9%
1940	4,684	+18.9%
1950	6,121	+30.7%
1960	9,916	+62.0%
1970	12,640	+27.5%
1980	15,461	+22.3%
1990	15,411	−0.3%
2000	15,901	+3.2%
2010	15,865	−0.2%
2020	17,144	+8.1%
2024*	17,537	+2.3%
* = population estimate. Source: United States census records and Population Estimates Program data.

As of the census of 2020, there were 17,144 people and 6,741 households in the town. The population density was 756.0 inhabitants per square mile (291.9/km^{2}). There were 6,904 housing units in the town. The racial makeup of the town was 92.64% White, 0.61% African American, 0.09% Native American, 1.00% Asian, 0.01% Pacific Islander, 0.89% from other races, and 4.77% from two or more races. Hispanic or Latino of any race were 2.19% of the population.

There were 6,741 households, out of which 28.0% had children under the age of 18 living with them, 55.9% were married couples living together, 26.0% had a female householder with no spouse present, and 11.6% had a male householder with no spouse present. 7.1% of all households were made up of individuals, and 3.1% had someone living alone who was 65 years of age or older. The average household size was 2.53 and the average family size was 2.99.

In the town, the population was spread out, with 19.3% under the age of 18, 5.1% from 18 to 24, 26.3% from 25 to 44, 27.4% from 45 to 64, and 21.9% who were 65 years of age or older. The median age was 44.4 years.

The median income for a household in the town was $116,627, and the median income for a family was $133,596. The per capita income for the town was $65,163. About 2.8% of the population were below the poverty line, including 2.7% of those under age 18 and 5.1% of those age 65 or over.

== Government ==
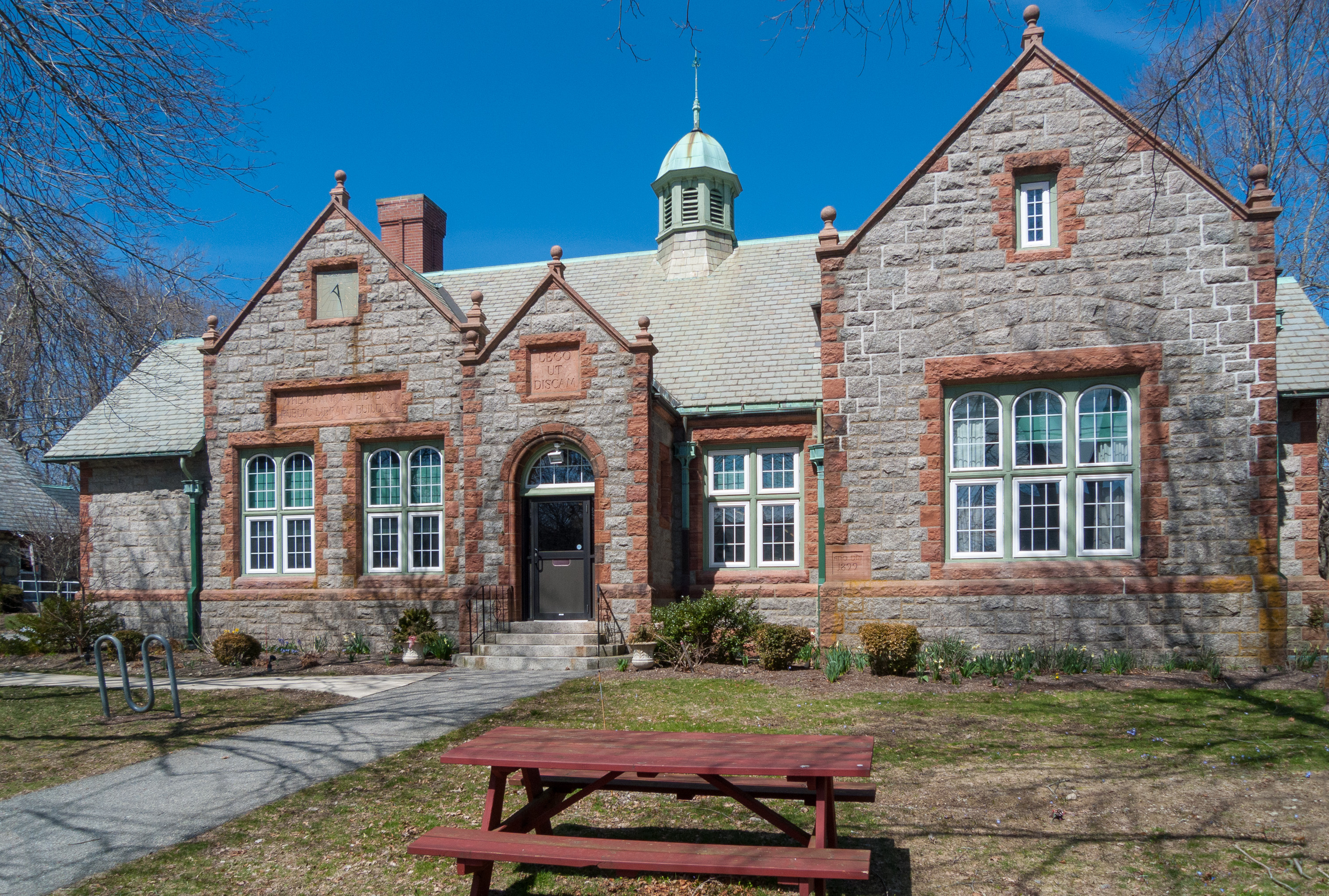
Swansea Public Library

On the state level, Swansea is a part of two state representative districts, the Fourth Bristol (including Rehoboth, Seekonk and part of Norton, Rep. Steve Howitt) and Fifth Bristol (including Dighton, Somerset and part of the city of Taunton, Rep. Justin Thurber). The town is part of the First Bristol and Plymouth state senatorial district, which includes the communities of Fall River, Freetown, Lakeville, Rochester, Somerset and Westport, currently Senator Michael Rodrigues (D-Westport) represents Swansea. Swansea is patrolled by Troop D (Southeast District), 3rd (Dartmouth) Barracks of the Massachusetts State Police. On the national level, the town is part of Massachusetts's 4th congressional district, which is represented by Jake Auchincloss. The state's senior Senator is Elizabeth Warren and the state's junior Senator is Edward Markey.

The town is governed by Selectmen and an Administrator. Swansea also maintains the tradition of open Town Meetings. As of 2001, total property values are assessed at $980 million, and property taxes amount to $15 million. The town operates on a budget of approximately $10 million, which does not include another $13.5 million spent on schools.

The town has four fire stations (the Central station being in South Swansea, with branch stations in North Swansea, Central Swansea and Ocean Grove), one library, a single police station, and a new post office. The town has two playgrounds, as well as a town beach with a picnic area (near the mouth of the Cole), and the town conservation farm.

From the 1960s the 2016 election, Swansea was a Democratic Party stronghold. The town only voted for a Republican once, that being Ronald Reagan in 1984. However, since 2016, the town has been trending more towards the Republican Party, and in the 2024 election, in which Bristol County swung heavily to the right, Trump became the first Republican to win the town by double digits since Dwight D. Eisenhower in 1956.

Swansea presidential election results
Year	Democratic	Republican	Third parties	Total Votes	Margin
2024	42.40% 4,295	55.80% 5,658	0.70% 74	10,027	13.4%
2020	47.20% 4,736	51.06% 5,123	1.74% 175	10,034	3.86%
2016	45.32% 3,928	50.20% 4,351	4.48% 388	8,667	4.88%
2012	57.20% 4,516	41.51% 3,277	1.29% 102	7,895	15.69%
2008	57.49% 4,887	40.09% 3,408	2.42% 206	8,501	17.40%
2004	62.66% 5,256	36.19% 3,036	1.14% 96	8,388	26.47%
2000	63.45% 4,827	30.65% 2,332	5.90% 449	7,608	32.79%
1996	62.16% 4,553	24.98% 1,830	12.86% 942	7,325	37.17%
1992	47.20% 3,837	25.54% 2,076	27.26% 2,216	8,129	19.94%
1988	56.75% 4,012	42.21% 2,984	1.03% 73	7,069	14.54%
1984	48.52% 3,266	51.03% 3,435	0.45% 30	6,731	2.51%
1980	44.39% 3,013	39.97% 2,713	15.65% 1,062	6,788	4.42%
1976	58.98% 4,051	38.74% 2,661	2.27% 156	6,868	20.24%
1972	49.85% 3,114	49.53% 3,094	0.62% 39	6,247	0.32%
1968	60.45% 3,307	36.08% 1,974	3.47% 190	5,471	24.36%
1964	74.84% 4,052	25.03% 1,355	0.13% 7	5,414	49.82%
1960	60.07% 3,055	39.76% 2,022	0.18% 9	5,086	20.31%
1956	34.01% 1,565	65.95% 3,035	0.04% 2	4,602	31.94%
1952	34.64% 1,359	65.26% 2,560	0.10% 4	3,923	30.61%
1948	47.93% 1,353	51.40% 1,451	0.67% 19	2,823	3.47%
1944	45.23% 1,047	54.77% 1,268	0.00% 0	2,315	9.55%
1940	48.00% 1,082	51.77% 1,167	0.22% 5	2,254	3.77%

== Education ==
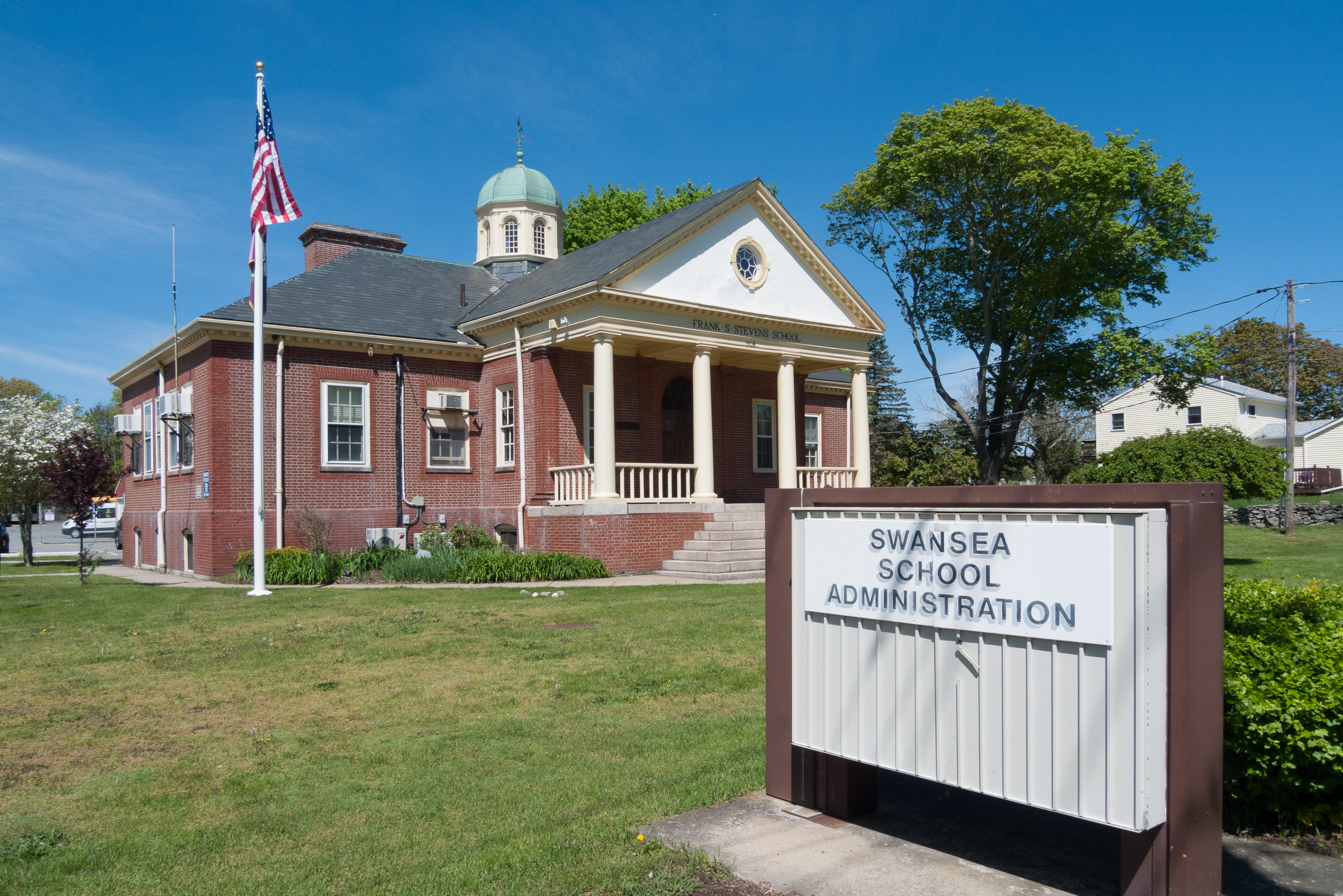
Swansea School Administration building, Main Street and Hortonville Road.

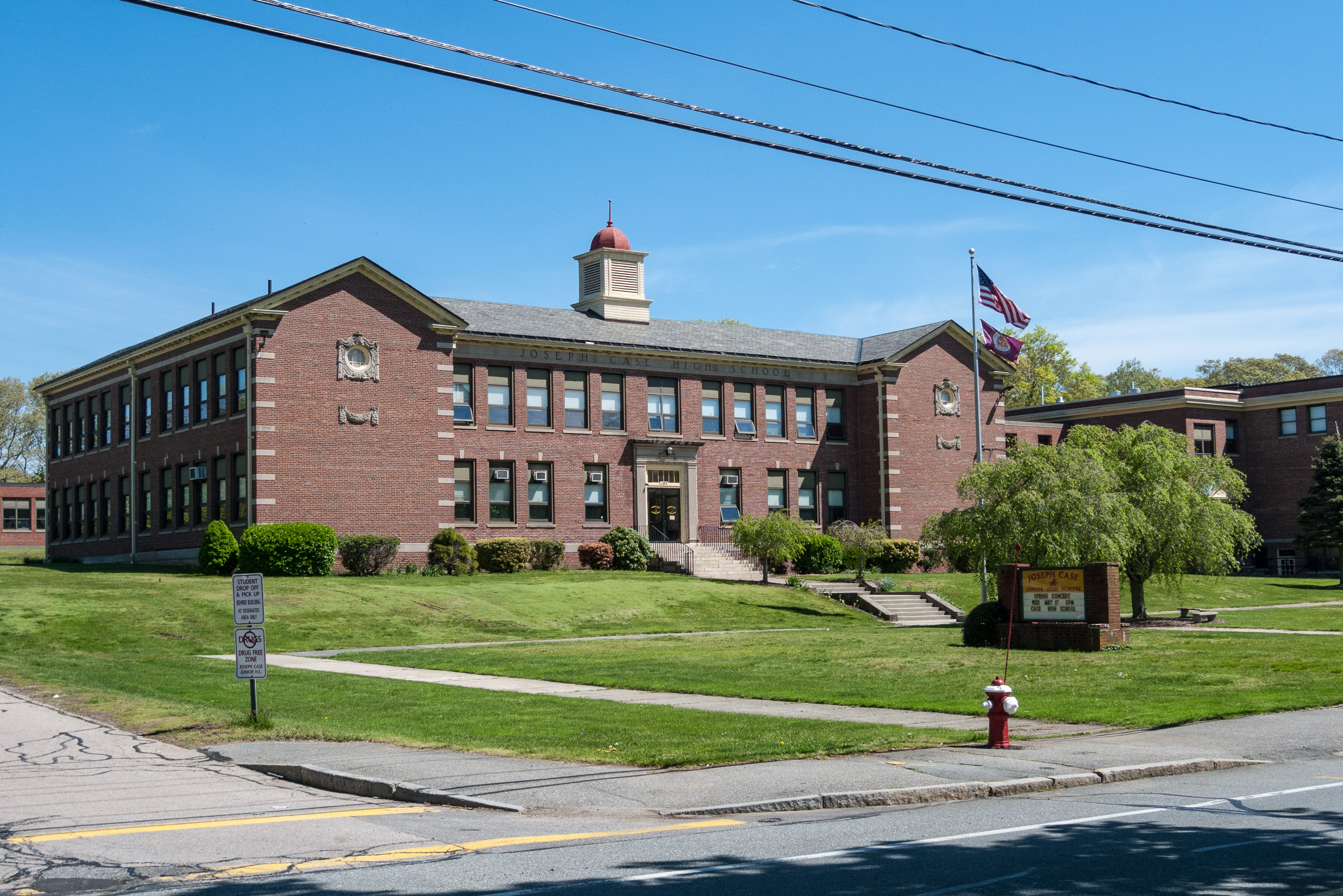
Joseph Case Junior High School, Main Street

=== Secondary ===
The Swansea Public Schools serve the town, with four elementary schools (Joseph G. Luther Elementary School at Luther's Corner, Gardner Elementary School in the South Swansea-Ocean Grove neighborhood, Elizabeth S. Brown Elementary School near the town center, and Mark Hoyle Elementary School in North Swansea), as well as Joseph Case Junior High School and Joseph Case High School, both located in the town center. Case High School (as it is commonly known) has the school colors of maroon and gold, and its mascot is the Cardinal. High school students also have the option of attending Diman Regional Vocational Technical High School in Fall River, or Bristol County Agricultural High School in Dighton.

There are two Christian schools in town, and there are also local Catholic schools in nearby Warren and Fall River.

=== Post-secondary ===
Eastern Nazarene College previously offered Adult Studies/LEAD classes in Swansea, until they shuttered operations in 2025.

== Transportation ==
The town is bisected by Interstate 195, U.S. Route 6, and state routes 103, 118 and 136. Swansea has two exits off I-195 serving the town, Exit 5 (Route 136) and 8 (Route 6 to Route 118). In addition, Exit 10 (Route 103) in Somerset provides quick access to the Ocean Grove neighborhood.

Swansea is the western terminus of the Southeastern Regional Transit Authority (SRTA) bus line. Regional bus service can be reached in Fall River, and the nearest regional rail service is in Providence. The nearest national airline service can be reached at T. F. Green Airport in Rhode Island, and international service can be reached at Logan International Airport in Boston.

== Notable people ==
- Antone S. Aguiar Jr., politician
- Benjamin Brown, politician
- Benjamin Carpenter, military officer and 2nd Lieutenant Governor Of the Vermont Republic
- Oliver Chace, businessman
- Warren A. Cole, lawyer
- Mark Anthony DeWolf, merchant
- Bob Evans, wrestler
- Joshua K. Ingalls, inventor
- David Leite, writer
- John Myles, founder of Swansea
- David J. Place, politician
- Cheryl Wheeler, musician
- Thomas Willett, 1st and 3rd Mayor Of New York City
