= Leia (disambiguation) =

Princess Leia is a fictional character in Star Wars.

Leia may also refer to:

== People with the name ==
- Leia (given name)
- Leia Dongue (born 1991), Mozambican basketball player
- Léia Scheinvar (born 1954), Brazilian-Mexican botanist
- Léia Silva (born 1985), Brazilian volleyball player
- Leia Meow (born 1976), professional wrestling valet
- Peter de Leia (died 1198), Welsh bishop
- Leia (Degrassi), fictional character from a Canadian TV series
- Leia Rolando, character in the Tales of Xillia video games

== Other uses ==
- LEIA Inc, a Silicon Valley startup company developing an interactive holographic display for mobile devices
- Leia (fly), a genus of fungus gnats
- "Leia" (Drifters), a 2014 television episode
- Eilema leia, a moth of the family Erebidae

== See also ==
- Leya (disambiguation)
- Lea (disambiguation)
- Lia (disambiguation)
- Laia (disambiguation)
- Lya (disambiguation)
- Leah
