= Laia =

Laia may refer to:

== People ==
- Laia (given name), including a list of people
- Francisca Laia (born 1994), Portuguese sprint canoeist
- Bu Laia, Hawaiian comedian Shawn Kaui Hill
- Laia people, an indigenous Australian people of the state of Queensland

== Other uses ==
- Laia (tool), a two-pronged type of foot-plough used in the Basque Country
- LAIA, the Latin American Integration Association
- Laia, protagonist of the fantasy novel An Ember in the Ashes

== See also ==
- Leia (disambiguation)
- Laya (disambiguation)
- Lya (disambiguation)
