= Leah (given name) =

Leah is a feminine given name of Hebrew origin. Its meaning is often deciphered as "delicate" or "weary". The name can be traced back to the Biblical matriarch Leah, one of the two wives of Jacob. This name may derive from Hebrew: לֵאָה, romanized: lē’ah, presumably cognate with Akkadian 𒀖 littu, meaning 'wild cow', from Proto-Semitic *layʾ-at- ~ laʾay-at- 'cow'.

The name "Leah" also refers to the Old English word léah meaning "meadow". The word is a common component in Anglo-Saxon place names and can denote forests, clearings and fields.

== Variants ==
- Lea – Croatian, Danish, Dutch, Estonian, Finnish, German, Hungarian, Indonesian, Norwegian, Polish, Serbian, Slovene, Spanish, Swedish, Yoruba, Hawaiian
- Léa – French
- לאה – Hebrew
- Liya – Amharic, Turkish
- Leah – English
- Leia – Koine Greek, Portuguese
- Lėja – Lithuanian
- Lia – Ecclesiastical Latin, Italian, Portuguese, Romanian, German, Catalan
- Lía – Galician
- Liadh – Irish
- Lìyǎ – Chinese
- Liah
- Lya
- Λεία (Lia) – Greek
- Liia – Estonian
- Lija – Latvian

== Royalty ==
- Leah Isadora Behn, the second daughter of Princess Märtha Louise of Norway

== Public figures ==
- Leah Hanson, American politician
- Leah Manning (1886–1977), British activist and politician
- Leah Rabin (1928–2000), wife of Israeli Prime Minister Yitzhak Rabin
- Leah Rosenthal (1879–1930), Australian nurse who served in World War I
- Leah Taylor Roy (born 1960), Canadian politician
- Leah Ward Sears (born 1955), American judge

== Arts and sports ==
- Leah Applebaum, American voice actress
- Leah Ayres (born 1957), American actress
- Leah Baird (1883–1971), American actress
- Leah Bertrand (born 2002), sprinter from Trinidad and Tobago
- Leah Betts (1977–1995), British water intoxication / ecstasy victim
- Leah Bracknell (1964–2019), British actress
- Leah Cairns (born 1974), Canadian actress
- Leah Cherniak (born 1956), Canadian playwright and theatre director
- Leah Clark (born 1979), American voice actress affiliated with Funimation
- Leah Dizon (born 1986), American-born Japanese model and singer
- Leah Falland (born 1992), American steeplechase runner
- Leah Fortune (born 1990), Brazilian-American football (soccer) player
- Leah Goldberg (1911–1970), Israeli writer
- Leah Goldstein (born 1969), Canadian-born Israeli professional road racing cyclist, former World Bantamweight Kickboxing Champion, and Israel's Duathlon champion
- Leah Haywood (born 1976), Australian singer
- Leah Horowitz (runner) (1933–1956), Israeli Olympic hurdler
- Leah Jeffries (born 2009), American actress
- Leah Kaslar (born 1985), Australian rules footballer
- Leah Krinsky, American comedy writer
- Leah Laiman (born 1946), American writer
- Leah Lewis (born 1996), American actress
- Leah McHenry (born 1984), Canadian musician and music educator
- Leah Miller (born 1981), Canadian actress
- Leah Moore (born 1978), British comic book writer
- Leah Neset (born 2005), American ice dancer
- Leah Neuberger (1915–1993), American table tennis player
- Leah Owen (1953–2024), Welsh singer
- Leah Peasall, American bluegrass singer
- Leah Pells (born 1964), Canadian track and field athlete
- Leah Pinsent (born 1968), Canadian actress
- Leah Pipes (born 1988), American actress
- Leah Purcell (born 1970), Australian actress
- Leah Remini, American actress
- Leah Rhodes (1902–1986), American costume designer
- Leah Song, American musician and activist
- Leah Stecker (born 2003), American ice hockey player
- Leah Van Dale (born 1987), American professional wrestler better known as Carmella
- Leah Williams, comic book writer
- Leah Williamson (born 1997), English footballer

== Others ==
- Leah Berman (born 1976), American mathematician
- Leah Carola Czollek (born 1954), German author, mediator and trainer.
- Leah Chase (1923–2019), American chef
- Leah Findlater, Canadian and American computer scientist
- Leah Horowitz (1680–1755), Polish scholar and writer
- Leah Mosher, pilot in the Royal Canadian Air Force
- Leah Namugerwa (born 2004), climate activist

== Fictional characters ==
- Leah, in the British radio series The Space Gypsy Adventures
- Leah, in the American animated TV series Shimmer and Shine
- Leah, in the 2018 TV series The Crossing
- Leah, in the American TV series The Walking Dead
- Leah, in the 2018 movie Love, Simon
- Leah Murphy, in the American medical drama TV series Grey's Anatomy
- Leye (Ashkenazic pronunciation), in the play The Dybbuk
- Queen Leah, mother of Princess Aurora in Disney's 1959 animated film Sleeping Beauty
- Leah Brahms, in the TV series Star Trek: The Next Generation
- Leah Clearwater, in the Twilight novels by Stephenie Meyer
- Leah Estrogen, in the 2001 film Osmosis Jones
- Leah Jackson, a character in Karen McManus's One of Us Is Lying
- Leah Mordecai, title character of the 1856 novel by Belle K. Abbott
- Leah Patterson-Baker, in the Australian TV series Home and Away
- Leah Rose, in the Left Behind novels by Tim LaHaye and Jerry Jenkins
- Leah Kazuno, a member of fictional idol duo Saint Snow
- Leah Rilke, in the TV series The Wilds
- Leah the Fruit Bat, a bat who appeared as a guest in the first season of Jim Henson's Animal Show
- Leah Banning, in the Has Fallen film series
- Leah Vaughn, in The Perfect Guy

== See also ==
- Lea (given name)
- Leia (given name)
- Lia
- Liya (disambiguation)
- Lya (name)
