= Lea (given name) =

Female given name

Lea is a feminine given name. In French, the name Léa is from the biblical name Leah. In Spanish, the same name is Lía, and in Italian, Lia. In English, it is a name for the word 'lea', pronounced [liː], meaning pasture or meadow.

Notable people with the given name Lea include:

== People ==
=== Female ===
- Saint Lea, third-century Catholic saint
- Lea Antonoplis (born 1959), American tennis player
- Léa Bello (born 1987), French videographer, journalist, doctor of geophysics
- Lea Bošković (born 1999), Croatian tennis player
- Lea Cohen (born 1942), Bulgarian author and diplomat
- Lea Carpenter (American writer and editor)
- Lea Dabič (born 1981), Slovenian alpine skier
- Lea DeLaria (born 1958), American comedian, actress and jazz musician
- Léa Koyassoum Doumta (born 1956), Central African politician and teacher
- Lea Drinda, German actress
- Léa Drucker (born 1972), French actress
- Lea Gavino (born 1999), Italian actress and singer-songwriter
- Lea Gottlieb (1918–2012), Hungarian-born Israeli fashion designer
- Lea Faragó, Hungarian handballer
- Lea Heidbreder (born 1991), German politician
- Lea Hernandez (born 1964), American comic book and webcomic artist
- Lea Hopkins (born 1944), American LGBT rights activist
- Lea Horowitz (1933–1956), Israeli Olympic hurdler
- Lea Haggett (married name Goodman / English high jumper)
- Lea Massari (1933–2025), Italian actress
- Lea Maurer (born 1971), American swimmer and coach
- Lea Melandri (born 1941), Italian feminist scholar, journalist and writer
- Lea Michele (born 1986), American actress and singer
- Lea Niako (1908–?), German dancer and actress
- Lea Padovani (1920–1991), Italian actress
- Lea Pericoli (1935–2024), Italian tennis player
- Lea Polonsky (born 2002), Israeli swimmer
- Lea Popovičová (born 2007), Slovak speed skater
- Lea Piltti (1904–1982), Finnish opera singer
- Lea Reisner (born 1989), German politician
- Lea Salonga (born 1971), Filipina singer, actress, and columnist
- Lea Sirk (Slovenian singer and songwriter)
- Léa Seydoux (born 1985), French actress
- Lea Sölkner (born 1958), Austrian retired alpine skier
- Lea Stevens (born 1947), Australian politician
- Lea Thompson (born 1961), American actress
- Lea Tahuhu (New Zealand cricketer)
- Lea T (real name Leandra Medeiros Cerezo / Brazilian and Italian transgender fashion model)

=== Lea but not female ===
- Lea Wood (English racing driver)

== Fictional characters ==
- Lea, the main protagonist of the video game CrossCode
- Lea, the original name of Axel from the Kingdom Hearts video game series
- Lea Clark, American Girl character
- Lea Dilallo, the wife of Shaun Murphy from The Good Doctor

== See also ==
- LEA (disambiguation), also covers Lea
- LEAS (disambiguation)
- Leah (given name)
- Lia
