= Maivia =

Maivia is a surname of Samoan origin. Notable people with the surname include:

- Peter Maivia (1937–1982), Samoan-American professional wrestler, grandfather of Dwayne "The Rock" Johnson
- Lia Maivia (1931–2008), Samoan professional wrestling promoter, wife of Peter Maivia
