= U.S. Express =

Professional wrestling tag team

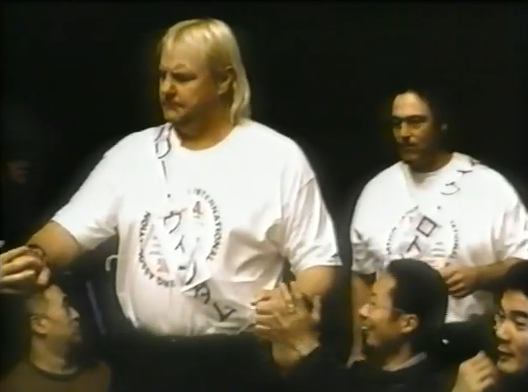
- U.S. Express in 2004

Tag team
- Members: Barry Windham; Mike Rotunda
- Billed heights: Windham: 6 ft 4 in (1.93 m); Rotunda: 6 ft 3 in (1.91 m)
- Combined billed weight: 523 lb (237 kg)
- Debut: 1983
- Disbanded: 2008
- Years active: 1983–1987

The U.S. Express was a professional wrestling tag team composed of Mike Rotunda and Barry Windham in the World Wrestling Federation. Windham was later replaced by Dan Spivey and the team was renamed the American Express.

== History ==
=== Championship Wrestling from Florida (1983–1984) ===
In September 1983, Windham and Rotunda formed the U.S. Express in Championship Wrestling from Florida. They feuded with the Zambuie Express (Elijah Akeem and Kareem Muhammad), the Long Riders (Ron Bass and Black Bart) and Hector Guerrero and Chavo Guerrero Sr. On March 14, 1984, they defeated the Long Riders for NWA United States Tag Team Championship (Florida version). They dropped the titles back to the Long Riders on March 27. Afterwards they won the titles three more times until losing to Hector and Chavo Guerrero on July 14.

=== World Wrestling Federation (1984–1985) ===
Rotunda and Windham (real life brothers-in-law as Rotunda was married to Windham's sister Stephanie) had teamed off and on in the Florida territories before both were signed by the WWF in 1984. Once they joined the WWF they were given a patriotic gimmick along with the Bruce Springsteen song "Born in the U.S.A." as their entrance music. "Captain" Lou Albano also became their manager. During this time Mike Rotunda would often be referred to as "Mike Rotundo" by WWF commentators.

The U.S. Express made their WWF wrestling debut on October 30, 1984, when they defeated the team of Mohammad Saad & Bobby Bass. On January 21, 1985, the U.S. Express beat the team known as the East West Connection (Adrian Adonis & Dick Murdoch) for the WWF World tag-team titles. They would hold the titles for two months before losing them to the team of The Iron Sheik and Nikolai Volkoff at WrestleMania I at Madison Square Garden in New York when the Sheik hit Windham over the head with Freddie Blassie's cane allowing Volkoff to get the pin.

The U.S. Express became two-time Tag Team Champions when they regained the titles from Volkoff and the Sheik on June 17, 1985, in Poughkeepsie, New York on an episode of WWF Championship Wrestling. Their second reign would also last about two months before they lost the belts to The Dream Team (Greg "The Hammer" Valentine and Brutus Beefcake) at The Spectrum in Philadelphia after Beefcake rubbed Lucious Johnny V's lit cigar in Windham's eyes, blinding him and getting the pin. The team broke up near the end of 1985 when Barry Windham left the WWF to return to Florida. They had their last match together under the WWF banner exactly one year to the day after they made their debut.

Initially, Rick Derringer, who was working with the WWF at the time, wrote the track "Real American" for the team. When Windham left the WWF and the team split, the music was passed on to WWF Champion Hulk Hogan, with the song going on to still be associated with Hogan.

=== Japan and various promotions (1986) ===
In January 1986 they went to Japan to work for All Japan Pro Wrestling. Participated at the AWA's WrestleRock 86 in April 1986. The team was not billed as the U.S. Express since the name was owned by the WWF. The brothers-in-law reunited to defeat The Fabulous Ones (Stan Lane and Steve Keirn) while Rotunda was on a brief break from the WWF between January and May 1986. They returned to Florida on May 6 as they defeated Lex Luger and Ron Bass by disqualification.

=== The American Express (1986–1987) ===
Only days after Barry Windham left the WWF, Mike Rotunda was linked up with Dan Spivey and they became the American Express. Some referred to them as the U.S. Express II since the patriotic gimmick of the original U.S. Express was recycled with Spivey taking Barry Windham's place.

After the conclusion of their feud with the Dream Team, Mike Rotunda briefly left the WWF. After his subsequent return, the team reunited, feuding with The Moondogs, The Hart Foundation and The Islanders whom the team faced in their last match together on February 9, 1987. After Mike Rotunda left the WWF, Dan Spivey was repackaged as "Golden Boy" Dan Spivey before he left the WWF as well.

Spivey would wrestle in World Championship Wrestling (reuniting with Rotunda for a time as a member of Kevin Sullivan's Varsity Club in 1988–1989) and returned to World Wrestling Federation as Waylon Mercy in 1995. He would coincide with Rotunda, who was at the time competing as Irwin R. Schyster (see below), but never teamed together as Mercy was used as a singles wrestler. He retired from wrestling that year due to a career-ending injury.

=== Universal Wrestling Federation (1987) and aftermath ===
On October 7, 1987, they reunited for Bill Watts's Universal Wrestling Federation as they teamed with Brad Armstrong and Tim Horner as they lost to The Four Horsemen.

Rotunda went to wrestle for World Championship Wrestling where he became a heel under Kevin Sullivan's Varsity Club, and dominated the NWA World Television Championship while Windham, as a member of the Horsemen, held the NWA United States Championship. While Windham left WCW after losing his title, Rotunda stayed and won the NWA World Tag Team Championship with new ally "Dr. Death" Steve Williams. In 1991, he returned to the WWF as Irwin R. Schyster, with his gimmick being a ruthless tax accountant, and won the WWF tag team title three more times with Ted DiBiase as Money Inc.. He left WWF in August 1995 and returned to WCW as VK Wallstreet, Michael Wallstreet and Mike Rotunda. He left WCW in 2000 and wrestled for New Japan Pro-Wrestling and All Japan Pro Wrestling.

Windham, following the loss of his US title, returned to the WWF as the "Widow Maker" which was short lived. He returned to WCW in 1990 and after a long babyface run mostly fighting Paul E. Dangerously's Dangerous Alliance and other heels, he retired in 1994. In 1996 he came out of retirement and returned to the WWF as the "Stalker" a wild game hunter gimmick with camouflage on his face. He later formed a tag team with Bradshaw as the New Blackjacks. In 1998 he left WWF and returned to WCW. This time he teamed with his brother Kendall Windham with the West Texas Rednecks. He left WCW in 1999 and went to All Japan Pro Wrestling.

=== Reunions (2001, 2004, 2005, 2008, 2024, 2025) ===
After both men worked for WCW they worked for All Japan Pro Wrestling and reunited on January 28, 2001. They teamed with Curt Hennig as they lost to Johnny Smith, Jim Steele and George Hines.

On May 5, 2004, for IWA Japan they teamed with Ryo Miyake as they defeated Jim Duggan, Animal Warrior and Keizo Matsuda being refereed by Ted DiBiase.

They participated at WrestleReunion as they lost to Larry Zbyszko and Ron Bass on January 28, 2005.

On the March 10, 2008 episode of WWE RAW, U.S. Express made an appearance in a rematch from WrestleMania I against Volkoff & The Iron Sheik. Before the match could begin, they were interrupted by diva Jillian Hall. She offered to sing "Born in the USA" for them before being given an airplane spin by Rotunda.

On April 5, 2024, the U.S. Express was inducted into the WWE Hall of Fame before WrestleMania XL.

On May 24, 2025, the U.S. Express was acknowledged in the crowd during Saturday Night's Main Event XXXIX.

== Championships and accomplishments ==
- Championship Wrestling from Florida
  - NWA United States Tag Team Championship (Florida version) (4 times)
- Pro Wrestling Illustrated
  - PWI ranked them #48 of the top 100 tag teams of the "PWI Years" with in 2003
- World Wrestling Federation
  - WWF World Tag Team Championship (2 times)
  - WWE Hall of Fame (Class of 2024)

== See also ==
- The Blackjacks
- Money Inc.
- The Varsity Club
- The West Texas Rednecks
- The York Foundation
