= Lia =

- Pronunciation: /ˈliːə/ LEE-ə
- Gender: female

Other names
- Related names: Lea, Leah, Leia, Lía, Liyah

Lia is a feminine given name. In the Spanish-speaking world, it is accented Lía. In English-speaking countries, the name may be a variant of Leah or Lea. The biblical matriarch Leah is known as Lia in the Latin Vulgate text. Lia may be a diminutive of various names including Julia, Cecilia, Amelia, Talia, Cornelia, Ophelia, Rosalia / Roselia, Natalia, Aurelia, Adalia / Adelia, Ailia, Apulia, Alia / Aleah. In Hebrew, the name means to me, God and is also the Israeli version of the English pronunciation of Leah or Lea. It can also be a surname.

== People with the given name Lia ==
- Lia (artist), Austrian software artist
- Lia (Japanese singer)
- Lia (South Korean singer)
- Lia Andrea Ramos (born 1981), Filipino model
- Lia Ashmore (born 1995), Paraguayan model
- Lía Bermúdez (1930–2021), Venezuelan sculptor
- Francesca Lia Block (born 1962), American writer
- Lia Block (Born 2006), American racing driver
- Lia Franca (1912-1988) Italian actress
- Lía Borrero (born 1976), Panamanian beauty queen
- Lia Boysen (born 1966), Swedish actress
- Lia Chang (born 1963), American actress and journalist
- Lia Corinaldi (1904–1989), Italian teacher and politician
- Lia Cruz (born 1985), Philippine television host
- Lía Cueva (born 2011), Mexican diver
- Lia Dorana (1918–2010), a Dutch actress
- Lia Eibenschütz (1899–1985), German actress
- Lia Eliava (1934–1998), Georgian actress
- Lia Félix (1830-1908), French actress
- Lia Finocchiaro (born 1984), Australian politician
- Lia Monica Fontaine (born 2009), Canadian gymnast
- Lia Halloran (born 1977), American painter
- Lia Ices, American singer
- Lia Marie Johnson (born 1996), American actress and singer
- Lia Knight, American radio personality
- Lia Kohl, classical composer and cellist
- Lia Laats (1926-2004), Estonian actress
- Lia Larsson (born 2001), Swedish singer
- Lia Looveer (1920–2006), Estonian émigré political activist in Australia
- Lia Maivia (1927–2008), Samoan wrestling promoter
- Lia Manoliu (1932–1998), Romanian discus thrower
- Lia McHugh (born 2005), American actress
- Lia Menna Barreto (born 1959), Brazilian artist
- Lia Mills, Irish writer
- Lia Neal (born 1995), American swimmer
- Lia Nici-Townsend (born 1969), British politician
- Lia Osipian (born 1930), Armenian biologist
- Lia Pereira,Canadian Olympian Figure Skater
- Lia Pernell (born 1981), American rower
- Lia Purpura (born 1964), American writer
- Lia Redick (born 2009), Canadian artistic gymnast
- Lia Roberts (born Lia Sandu, 1949), Romanian and American politician
- Lia Rousset (born 1977), American canoer
- Lia Sargent (born 1957), American voice actress
- Lia Schilhuber, East German canoer
- Lia Shemtov (born 1958), Israeli politician
- Lia Tadesse (born in 1976), Ethiopian politician
- Lia Thomas (born 1999), American swimmer
- Lia van Leer (1924–2015), Israeli film archivist
- Lia Vissi (born 1955), Cypriot singer, songwriter and composer
- Lia Wälti (born 1993), Swiss football player
- Lia Williams (born 1964), English actress and film director
- Lia Wyler (1934–2018), Brazilian translator

== People with the surname Lia ==
- Brynjar Lia (born 1966), Norwegian historian
- Donny Lia (born 1978), American race car driver
- Orsa Lia, American female singer
- Simone Lia, English cartoonist and author
- Vince Lia (born 1985), Australian football player

=== In mythology ===
- Conán mac Lia, son of Liath Luachra

== See also ==
- Lea (given name)
- Lea (surname)
- Leah (given name)
- LIA
- Princess Leia, fictional character in Star Wars
