= Leya =

Leya may refer to:

- Grupo Leya, a Portuguese publishing company
- Leya language, a language of Zambia and Zimbabwe
- Ella Leya, Azerbaijani American composer, singer, and writer
- Leya Buchanan (born 1996), Canadian athlete
- Leya Evelyn (born 1937), Canadian artist
- Leya Kırşan (born 2008), Turkish actress
- Leya (musicians), New York-based musicians

== See also ==
- Prémio Leya, a Portuguese literary award
- Leia (disambiguation)
- Laya (disambiguation)
- Lea (disambiguation)
