= Laya (surname) =

Laya is a surname. Notable people with the name include:

- Argelia Laya (1926–1997), Venezuelan educator and activist
- Diouldé Laya (1937–2014), Nigerien sociologist
- Jaime C. Laya (born 1939), Filipino banker and government official
- Jean-Louis Laya (1761–1833), French playwright
- Léon Laya (c. 1810–1872), French playwright

== See also ==
- Laya (disambiguation)
