= Leia (given name) =

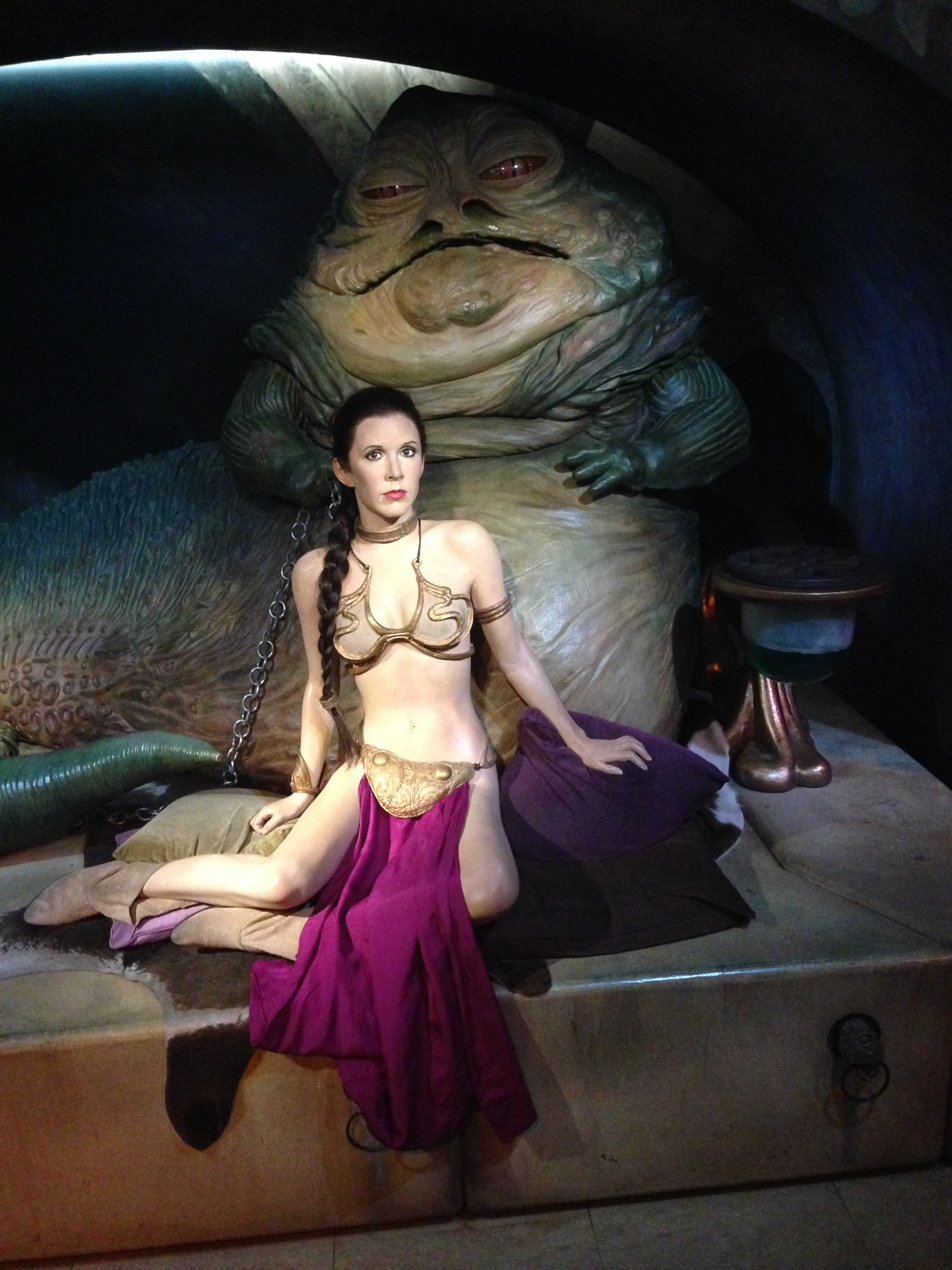
- A wax replica of actress Carrie Fisher as Princess Leia in the film Star Wars: Return of the Jedi (1983).
- Pronunciation: English: /leɪə/
- Gender: female

Origin
- Origin: Hebrew
- Meaning: languid

Other names
- Related names: Leiya, Léia

Leia is a variant of the Hebrew Leah, meaning languid in several languages, including Koine Greek and Portuguese. It is commonly used in reference to Leia Organa, a character from the Star Wars franchise who first appeared in the film Star Wars: A New Hope (1977). In the film, Leia is a princess from the fictional planet Alderaan. She marries Han Solo, and becomes the mother of Kylo Ren. The name of the character was chosen based on its phonetic similarity to the name of Dejah Thoris, the heroine of Edgar Rice Burroughs' series of Martian novels, and to Galadriel, a character created by J. R. R. Tolkien in his Middle-earth writings. Star Wars creator George Lucas also wanted the names used in the films to be unusual but not too outlandish.

The name Leia was among the top 1,000 names for girls in the United States in 1978, shortly after the release of the 1977 film Star Wars: A New Hope, and again in 1980, after the release of the 1980 film Star Wars: The Empire Strikes Back. It then declined in use, but rose again in usage during the 21st century. The name has been among the 1,000 most popular names for newborn girls in the United States since 2006, and among the top 300 since 2017. It has also been among the top 500 names in use for girls in the United Kingdom between 1998 and 2002, in 2005, in 2009, and between 2015 and 2020. Lėja, the Lithuanian version of the name, is among the most popular names for girls in Lithuania.

== Notable people ==
- Leia Dongue (born 1991), Mozambican basketball player
- Léia Scheinvar (born 1954), Brazilian-Mexican botanist
- Leia Stirling (born 1981), American academic, Charles Stark Draper Professor of Aeronautics at Massachusetts Institute of Technology and co-director of the human systems laboratory
- Leia Zhu (born 2006), British-Chinese classical violinist

== Fictional characters ==
- Leia Organa, a major character in the Star Wars Universe
- Leia Foreman, the daughter of Eric and Donna in That 90's Show
