= Laya =

Laya or Layah may refer to:

== People ==
- Laya (surname)
- Laya Francis (born 1963), former Test and One Day International cricketer who represented India
- Laya Raki (born 1927), former dancer and film actress popular in Germany in the 1950s and early 1960s
- Laya Rocha, musician, collaborator with Caíseal Mór
- Layah (singer) (born 1989), Ukrainian singer

== Places ==
- Laya, Bhutan, a town in Gasa District in northwestern Bhutan
- Laya, Guinea, a village in the Forécariah Prefecture in the Kindia Region of Guinea
- Layah, Iran, a village in Gilan Province, Iran
- Layyah, a city in Punjab province, Pakistan

== Other uses ==
- Laya, a term for tempo in Indian classical music
- Heteropoda venatoria, a spider of family Sparassidaeknown, known as laya in some places
- Laia (tool), a farming implement known in Spanish as laya
- Laya Healthcare, a health insurance company in Ireland
- Laya, the Witch of Red Pooh, a manhwa series by Yo Yo
- Laya yoga, a form of yoga

== See also ==
- The Layap people, an indigenous people of Bhutan
- Layar (disambiguation)
- Layyah (disambiguation)
