= Dee Brasseur =

Canadian retired military officer

Personal details
- Born: Deanna Marie Brasseur; September 9, 1953 (age 72) Pembroke, Ontario
- Known for: One of the first female RCAF Fighter Pilots

Military service
- Allegiance: Canada
- Branch/service: Air Command
- Years of service: 1972–1994
- Rank: Major
- Unit: 416 Squadron
- Commands: 417 Squadron - Flight Commander

Deanna Marie "Dee" Brasseur, CM (born September 9, 1953) is a Canadian retired military officer (Major). She is credited as being Canada's very first female fighter pilot, one of the first three women to earn her wings as a Canadian Forces military pilot for active duty, and one of the first two female CF-18 Hornet fighter pilots in the world.

== Biography ==
Deanna Marie "Dee" Brasseur was born on September 9, 1953, in Pembroke, Ontario, to Lieutenant Colonel Lionel C. (Lyn) Brasseur and Marie Olive (née Aucoin).

The family lived in Centralia, near London, Ontario, where her father was based with the Royal Canadian Air Force (RCAF).

She joined the Canadian Forces in 1972 as an administrative clerk at a dental unit detachment in Winnipeg, Manitoba. The following year, she was accepted for commissioning under the Officer Candidate Training Program, posted to North Bay, Ontario, graduating as an Air Weapons Controller in 1974. In 1979, as the Canadian Forces introduced a trial program to employ women in traditionally men’s roles, she was accepted into a pilot training course. Brasseur, along with Nora Bottomley and Leah Mosher, graduated from Canadian Forces Flight Training School in Portage la Prairie. She received her wings on February 13, 1981.

Brasseur thereafter put in a request to become a flight instructor in Moose Jaw, Saskatchewan, which was granted.

The forces subsequently began a trial allowing women to fly fighter jets, which Brasseur was accepted into in June 1988, along with Captain Jane Foster. In June 1989, following twelve months of training on Canadair CF-5 and McDonnell Douglas CF-18 Hornet jet fighter aircraft, Brasseur and Foster became the only two women in the world flying fighters in operational squadrons. Canada was the first country to allow women to fly in a combat role since the Second World War, when the Soviet Union used women to fly fighters in combat.

Brasseur was promoted to major in 1989 and posted to the National Defence Headquarters in Ottawa at the Directorate of Flight Safety, in March 1990. She retired from the military in 1994 with 2,500 hours of jet flying.

In 1998, a Maclean's cover story on sexual abuse in the Canadian Forces prompted Brasseur to go public with her own experiences. In the June 1 edition of the magazine, Brasseur claimed that throughout her 21-year career she faced unwanted sexual advances, was raped by her enlisted boyfriend and was coerced into having sex with her flight teacher.

In retirement, Brasseur has gone on to being a motivational speaker, as well as working part-time at a Ottawa pet store that she patronized. Following the September 11 attacks in the United States, joined the Reserves, where she stayed for a dozen years. She also founded the One in a Million Project to raise funds for organizations that support research, education, and treatment of post-traumatic stress disorder, including Wounded Warriors, Invictus Games and the Military Families Fund.

== Honours ==
In 1998, she was made a Member of the Order of Canada. In 2007, she was inducted into the Women in Aviation International Pioneer Hall of Fame.
