= WWE Hall of Fame (2024) =

Professional wrestling induction event

- Promotion: WWE
- Date: April 5, 2024
- City: Philadelphia, Pennsylvania
- Venue: Wells Fargo Center

WWE Hall of Fame chronology
← Previous; 2023	Next → 2025

The 2024 WWE Hall of Fame was a professional wrestling event produced by WWE that featured the induction of the 25th class into the WWE Hall of Fame. The ceremony took place on April 5, 2024, at the Wells Fargo Center in Philadelphia, Pennsylvania, the night preceding WrestleMania XL. It was livestreamed at 10 pm Eastern Time on Peacock in the United States and the WWE Network internationally, immediately after the airing of WWE's regular Friday night program, SmackDown. Paul Heyman, Bull Nakano, The U.S. Express (Barry Windham and Mike Rotunda), Lia Maivia, Muhammad Ali, and Thunderbolt Patterson were among the inductees.

During the ceremony, The Rock received a "People's Championship" from Lonnie Ali.

== Background ==
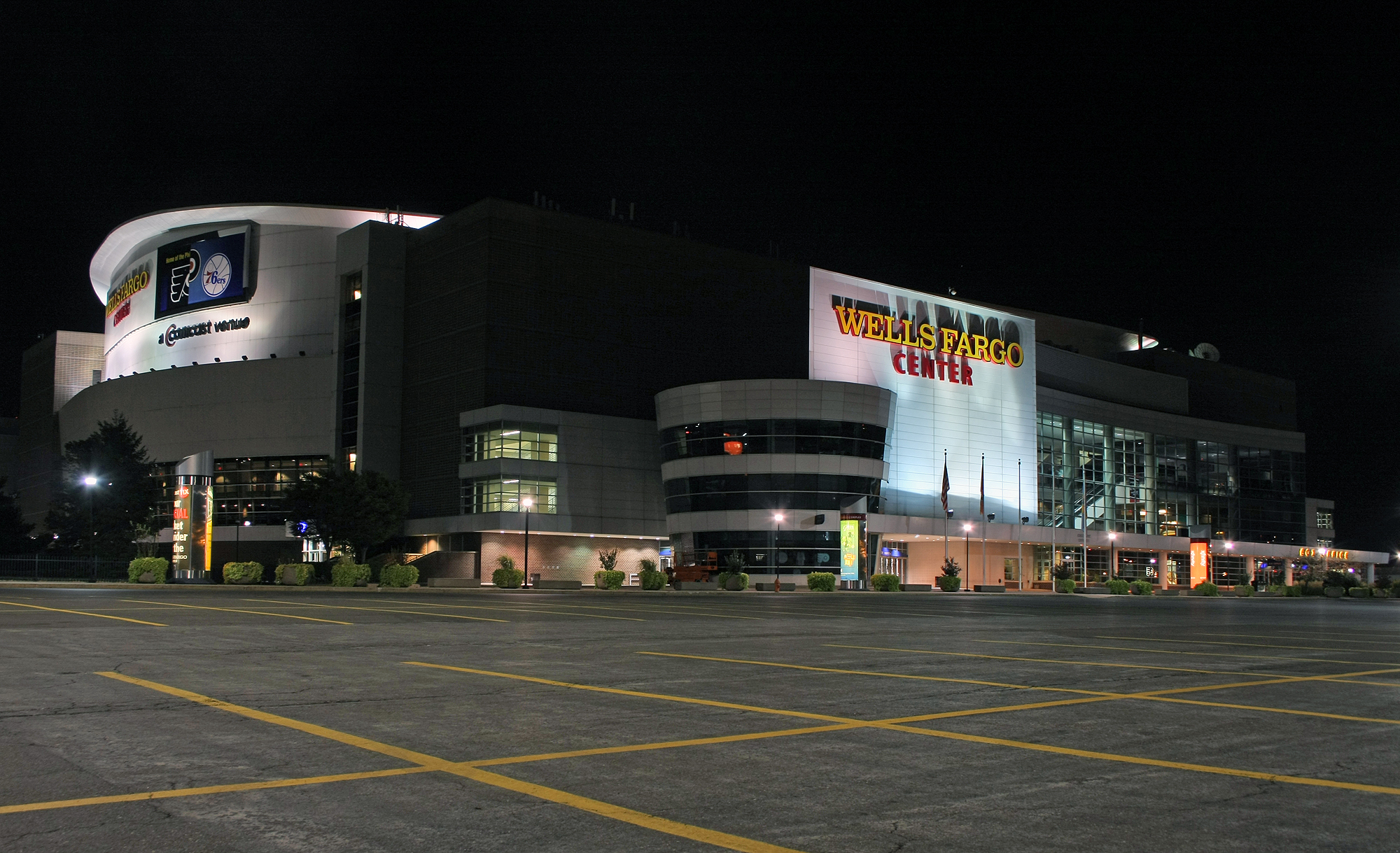
The event was held at the Wells Fargo Center in Philadelphia, Pennsylvania.

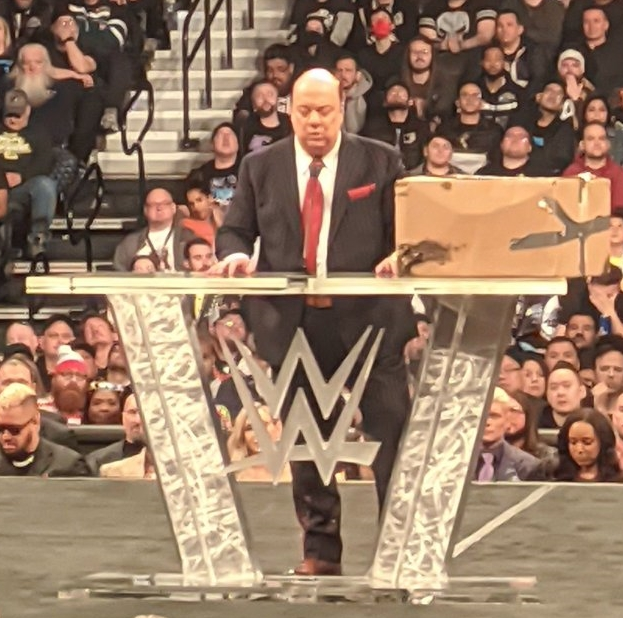
The headliner, Paul Heyman, delivering his induction speech

The 2024 WWE Hall of Fame was scheduled to be held on April 5, 2024, at the Wells Fargo Center in Philadelphia, Pennsylvania, the night before WrestleMania XL Night 1. It was scheduled to be livestreamed at 10 p.m. Eastern Time on Peacock in the United States and the WWE Network in most international markets, airing immediately after WWE's regular Friday night program, SmackDown.

On March 4, 2024, manager and former promoter Paul Heyman was announced as the first inductee. WWE had proposed the induction to Heyman in the past, but he declined, arguing he was an active worker. However, he accepted in 2024 due to WrestleMania taking place in Philadelphia, the home of his previous company, Extreme Championship Wrestling, the assets of which WWE acquired in 2003. The next day, WWE Chief Content Officer Triple H announced former WWF Women's Champion, Bull Nakano, as the second inductee. On March 8, The U.S. Express (Barry Windham and Mike Rotunda) were announced as the next inductees. On March 11, Muhammad Ali was announced as an inductee into the Celebrity Wing. On March 13, Thunderbolt Patterson was announced as the fifth inductee. On April 1, Lia Maivia was announced as the sixth inductee.

Former WWE Champion and WWE Universal Champion Bray Wyatt (Windham Rotunda), who died in August 2023 at the age of 36, was a fan favourite to be inducted in this class. WWE instead decided to induct the U.S. Express, as they felt the Rotunda family were still mourning Windham's passing and such an induction would be premature under those circumstances.

This is the third straight year the WWE Hall of Fame has not inducted any new inductees into the Legacy Wing. This is the first year since its introduction that there was no recipient of the Warrior Award.

== Inductees ==
=== Individual ===
- Class headliners appear in **boldface**

Image	Ring name (Birth name)	Inducted by	WWE recognized accolades
	**Paul Heyman**	Roman Reigns	Former manager and commentator for the American Wrestling Association and World Championship Wrestling; Owner and operator of the former Extreme Championship Wrestling promotion, which was founded in Philadelphia (host city of WrestleMania XL); Former on-screen general manager of WWE's SmackDown brand Former color commentator for Monday Night Raw; Manager of Brock Lesnar, Big Show, CM Punk, Kurt Angle, Steve Austin, Rick Rude, Arn Anderson and Roman Reigns, amongst others.
	Bull Nakano (Keiko Aoki)	Alundra Blayze	One-time WWF Women's Champion; 1994 Slammy Award winner for Most Devastating; Recognized as having won women's championships in Japan, Mexico, and the United States.
	Thunderbolt Patterson (Claude Patterson)	Scott Spears and The New Day (Big E, Kofi Kingston and Xavier Woods)	A fixture in various National Wrestling Alliance (NWA) territories from the 1960s through the 1980s Recognized as having won championships across North America.
	Lia Maivia	The Rock	Posthumous inductee: Represented by her grandson Dwayne "The Rock" Johnson; One of wrestling's first female promoters. Ran Polynesian Pro Wrestling (PPW), a territory of the NWA in Hawaii in the mid-1980s. Her promotion ran a show called Polynesian Pacific Pro Wrestling on the Financial News Network.

=== Group ===
Image	Recipient (Birth name)	Inducted by	WWE recognized accolades as a team
	The U.S. Express	Bo Dallas and Mika Rotunda	Two-time WWF Tag Team Champions
Barry Windham – Two-time inductee. Previously inducted in 2012 as a member of The Four Horsemen. Mike Rotunda (Lawrence Rotunda) – Three-time NWA World Television Champion (Mid-Atlantic version), one-time NWA World Tag Team Champion (Mid-Atlantic version) (without Barry), and three-time WWF Tag Team Champion (without Barry).

=== Celebrity ===
Image	Recipient (Birth name)	Inducted by	Notes
	Muhammad Ali (Cassius Clay Jr.)	The Undertaker	Posthumous inductee: Represented by his widow Yolanda. Three-time World Heavyweight Boxing Champion; Olympic Gold Medalist; Competed in "The War of the Worlds" against Antonio Inoki, a match dubbed by WWE as "MMA's first big fight" Special guest referee in the WrestleMania I main event. Guest of honor in the Collision in Korea event.
