= Lias =

Lias may refer to:

== Geology ==
- Lias Group, a lithostratigraphic unit in western Europe
  - Lias Formation, a geologic formation in France
  - Lias (period), the 19th-century name for the Early Jurassic epoch, named after certain rocks of the era

== People ==
- Godfrey Lias, British author
- Mohd Shamsudin Lias (born 1953), Malaysian politician
- Lias Andersson (born 1998), Swedish hockey player

== Other uses ==
- Lias (journal), title of the Journal of Early Modern Intellectual Culture and its Sources
- Lias, Gers, a commune of the Gers département in France
- LIAS (gene), a gene that in humans encodes the protein lipoic acid synthetase

== See also ==
- Lyas, a commune in southern France
- Lia (disambiguation)
