= Layar (disambiguation) =

Layar is technology company based in Amsterdam, Netherlands

Layar may also refer to:

- Layar (state constituency), in Malaysia
- Layar LRT station, a railway station in Singapore

== See also ==
- Laya (disambiguation)
