= Jane Foster (pilot) =

Personal details
- Known for: One of the first female RCAF Fighter Pilots

Military service
- Allegiance: Canada
- Branch/service: Royal Canadian Air Force
- Years of service: 1982–1992; 1999–2008
- Rank: Captain

Captain Jane Foster CD, is a retired member of the Royal Canadian Air Force. She is noteworthy for being one of the first Canadian women, and one of the first women in the world post World War II, to fly a fighter jet, along with her contemporary, Dee Brasseur.

== Biography ==
Foster joined the Canadian Forces in 1982 as one of the candidates in a trial program called SWINTER (Service-Women in Non-Traditional Environments and Roles.) SWINTER ran from 1979 to 1984, to assess whether women were competent to serve in various military roles. As part of SWINTER, Foster trained as a pilot and received her military wings in 1984.

Upon completion of her training, she was posted to the 2 Canadian Forces Flying Training School (2CFFTS) in Moose Jaw, Saskatchewan. She worked as an instructor at 2CFFTS for four years; in 1988, she was selected to be in the first cadre of female pilots to fly Canada's McDonnell Douglas CF-18 Hornet, commonly known as the CF-18 Fighter Jets. One other woman, Dee Brasseur, was selected for the program at the same time. The program was heavily condensed, and "crammed a four-year university course into one year." It required study of up to 18 hours a day on the CF-18 controls. Foster received combat-ready status after six months.

On February 20, 1989, a Canadian Human Rights Tribunal declared that the Canadian Forces were obligated to remove "any remaining employment restrictions base on sex, with the exception of submarine duty." While Foster and Brasseur were already enrolled in the training, the public commitment to women's integration in the Canadian Forces was supported by their participation in the CF-18 training.

On June 20, 1989, Foster and Brasseur officially became the first Canadian women to fly fighter jets.

== Historic achievement and controversy ==
When their training was complete in 1989, Foster and Brasseur became the first women anywhere in the world to fly fighter jets since the end of the Second World War. They also became the first Canadian women and the first female members of NATO to fly fighter jets, as the earlier World War II female fighter pilots had exclusively served in the Soviet Union. Colonel David Jurkowski, their commander, told the Canadian Press they were "the only women in the world, to our knowledge, in that unique position."

As a member of 441 Tactical Fighter Squadron, a NORAD unit, she participated in the intercept and escort of the first Soviet aircraft, a MiG-29 Fulcrum, to fly in Canadian airspace. She was one of six Canadian CF-18 pilots to fly in a Rim of the Pacific military exercise, where Canadian fighter jets had to simulate defensive measures against an attacking force attempting to destroy Comox, British Columbia.

The emergence of Foster and Brasseur as CF-18 pilots caused some public controversy. Ed Vanwoudenberg, the leader of the Christian Heritage Party of Canada, claimed that God did not intend for women to engage in high-speed flight, and that the force of the planes would damage their fertility.

== Later career ==
After flying the fighter jets for a year, Foster opted to transition into a ground job by choice, mentioning that operating the aircraft was "a little frightening." She did not participate in any combat missions as a military pilot.

Foster temporarily left the RAF from 1992 to 1999, raising her two children. From 1999 to 2006 she served as a part-time reservist; in 2006, she rejoined 2CFFTS as an instructor, where she taught and flew the CT-156 Harvard II. She is noted as being the first woman to serve as a military investigator of an aviation accident in Canada.

Foster retired from the Canadian Forces in 2008. As of 2015, she lives in Ottawa, Ontario.
