= Layyah (disambiguation) =

Layyah is a city in Punjab, Pakistan.

Layyah may also refer to:

== Places ==
- Layyah District, a district of Punjab (Pakistan)
- Layyah Tehsil, a tehsil of district Layyah
- Layyah, Sharjah, a village in the United Arab Emirates

== Other uses ==
- Layyah Barakat, a Syrian-born writer

== See also ==
- Laya (disambiguation)
