= Lya (name) =

Lya is a female first or given name and is usually thought of as a variant of "Lia" or "Leah."

Notable people with the name include:

- Lya Barrioz, Nicaraguan singer
- Lya De Putti (1899–1931), Hungarian actress
- Lya Isabel Fernández Olivares (born 2007), Mexican tennis player
- Lya Imber (1914–1981), Bessarabian-Venezuelan pediatrician
- Lya Ley (1899–1992), Austrian actress
- Lya Luft (born 1938), Brazilian writer
- Lya Lys (1908–1986), German American actress
- Lya Mara (1897–1960), German actress
