= Laia (given name) =

Laia (pronounced Lah-yah) is a shortened version of the Catalan feminine given name Eulàlia. Saint Eulalia is the patron saint of Barcelona, so her name and its derivatives (the most popular being Laia) are popular in Spain. Laia means "fair of speech" or "well spoken" in Greek.

It may refer to:

- Laia Abril (born 1986), Catalan artist
- Laia Aleixandri (born 2000), Spanish footballer
- Laia Ballesté (born 1999), Spanish footballer
- Laia Cañigueral (born 1981), Spanish sociologist and politician
- Laia Codina (born 2000), Spanish footballer
- Laia Costa (born 1985), Spanish actress
- Laia Forcadell (born 1982), Spanish sprinter and hurdler
- Laia Tutzó (born 1980), Spanish former sailor
- Laia Manzanares (born 1994), Spanish actress
- Laia Martínez i López (born 1984), Catalan writer and musician
- Laia Marull (born 1973), Spanish actress
- Laia Palau (born 1979), Spanish basketball player
- Laia Pons (born 1993), Spanish synchronized swimmer
- Laia Sanz (born 1985), Spanish motorcycle racer
