= Eilema leia =

Scientific classification
- Kingdom: Animalia
- Phylum: Arthropoda
- Class: Insecta
- Order: Lepidoptera
- Superfamily: Noctuoidea
- Family: Erebidae
- Subfamily: Arctiinae
- Genus: Eilema
- Species: E. leia

Binomial name
- Eilema leia (Hampson, 1901)

Synonyms
- Ilema leia Hampson, 1901; Leptilema leia (Hampson, 1901)

Species of moth

Eilema leia is a moth of the subfamily Arctiinae. It was described by George Hampson in 1901. It is found in the Democratic Republic of the Congo, Kenya, Nigeria and South Africa.
