= Lia Corinaldi =

Italian teacher and politician (1904–1989)

- Born: 27 December 1904; Turin, Kingdom of Italy
- Died: August 1989 (aged 84–85); Turin, Italy
- Occupation: Teacher

Lia Corinaldi (1904–1989) was an Italian teacher and politician who was a member of the Italian Communist Party (PCI). Being Jewish, she experienced hard times during the Fascist rule in Italy.

== Biography ==
Corinaldi was born in Turin on 27 December 1904. She hailed from a Jewish family, and her father was a lawyer. She received a PhD in philosophy in 1929 and began to work as a teacher in 1930. Later she became a professor of philosophy and pedagogy. On 24 December 1938, she was expelled from her teaching duties following the introduction of the racial laws. However, she continued her teaching activity at a Jewish high school in Turin until its forced closure in 1940. From 1941, she continued her teaching activity at the Saracco Institute using a false name. She was an active militant in the defense groups led by women and joined the PCI in 1943. From 1945 she resumed her teaching profession in Turin. She became the head of the school commission of the Turin Federation of the PCI and also, the trade union leader of the school. She was part of the board of the Turin Communist Federation and cofounder of the Cultural Union of Turin. She died in Turin in August 1989.
