= Leah Mosher =

Retired Canadian military officer

- Born: 1954; Sydney, Nova Scotia
- Aviation career
- Air force: Royal Canadian Air Force
- Rank: Major

Leah Mosher (June 19, 1954 – November 3, 2021) was a Canadian pilot in the Royal Canadian Air Force (RCAF), and was one of the first three women to earn their wings in the Canadian Armed Forces (CAF).

== Career ==
Leah Mosher was born in Sydney, Nova Scotia. Her parents had both worked as fighter-control operators for the Royal Canadian Air Force (RCAF). Mosher chose to pursue a military career, and was accepted into officer training for the Air Force, graduating in 1976. She then went on to complete a Bachelor of Arts in history at university.

Following that graduation, she became a supply officer at CFB Edmonton, and was promoted to captain in 1978. Mosher began undertaking private flying lessons as preparation should the Air Force begin to accept female pilots. With fellow Captains Nora Bottomley and Dee Brasseur, they were accepted to undergo flight training in the Air Force, and were presented with their wings on February 13, 1981.

Mosher was trained on the McDonnell Douglas CF-18 Hornet after an initial rejection as the relevant training was reserved for combat pilots only, which women were restricted from. Her base commander intervened and allowed her to undertake the training. She travelled to numerous countries afterwards to undertake manoeuvres. After a stint as a protocol officer, she trained on the Bombardier Challenger 600 series in 1987, flying those for the following two years. She was subsequently posted as staff officer to the director of recruiting services at the National Defense Headquarters.
