= Paul Heyman =

American professional wrestling promoter (born 1965)

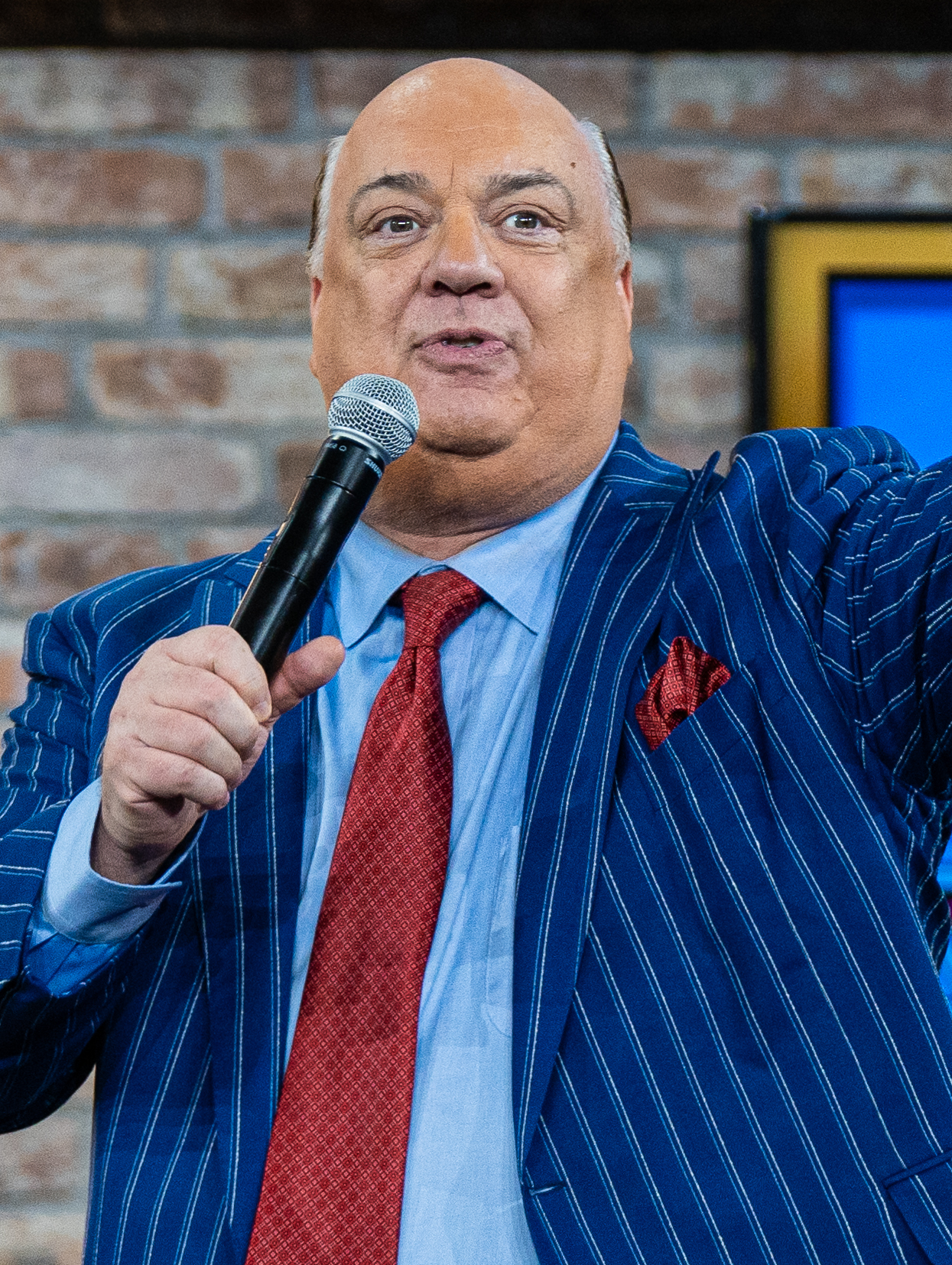
- Heyman in 2024

Personal information
- Born: September 11, 1965 (age 61) The Bronx, New York City, U.S.
- Education: SUNY Purchase
- Spouse: Marla Heyman (m. 2001; div. 2004)
- Children: 2
- Website: heymanhustle.com

Professional wrestling career
- Ring name(s): Paul Heyman; Paul E. Dangerously
- Billed from: Scarsdale, New York
- Debut: 1986

Paul Heyman (born September 11, 1965) is an American professional wrestling manager, former executive, promoter, and commentator. He is signed to WWE, where he is a creative advisor and an on-screen talent.

Heyman first gained prominence in the late 1980s as an on-screen manager under the name Paul E. Dangerously, working for promotions such as World Championship Wrestling (WCW) and the Continental Wrestling Federation. In 1993, he became the creative force behind the Philadelphia-based Eastern Championship Wrestling (ECW), eventually purchasing the company in 1995 and renaming it Extreme Championship Wrestling. Under his leadership, ECW gained a cult following and introduced a more aggressive, reality-based style that influenced major wrestling promotions in the years that followed.

After ECW closed in 2001, Heyman joined WWE, where he worked as a commentator, writer, and on-screen manager. He played a pivotal role in the early career of Brock Lesnar, serving as his manager for much of Lesnar's tenure in WWE. Heyman also contributed behind the scenes as a writer, including a run as lead writer for SmackDown in the early 2000s and later as executive director of Raw from 2019 to 2020.

Heyman is best known for his work as a manager, widely praised for his promo ability, character work, and influence on talent development. He has managed some of wrestling's biggest names, including Brock Lesnar, CM Punk, Kurt Angle, Big Show, Roman Reigns and Seth Rollins, and is credited with helping elevate numerous stars through his work both on and off screen. In 2024, Heyman was inducted into the WWE Hall of Fame.

== Early life ==
Paul Heyman was born on September 11, 1965, in the Bronx, New York City, to Sulamita (née Szarf; 1928–2009) and Richard S. Heyman (1926–2013), both of Jewish descent. His mother was a Holocaust survivor who endured the Łódź Ghetto and was later imprisoned at Auschwitz and Bergen-Belsen concentration camps. His father was a personal injury attorney and served in the United States Navy during World War II.

From a young age, Heyman exhibited entrepreneurial instincts. By age 11, he operated a mail-order business from his home, selling celebrity and sports memorabilia. During his teenage years, he began attending events at Madison Square Garden, where he gained backstage access as a self-proclaimed photojournalist for wrestling publications. Some of his photographs were published by the World Wide Wrestling Federation (WWWF). He later graduated from Edgemont High School and attended SUNY Purchase, where he worked as an on-air personality at the college's radio station. He also hosted programs on WARY-FM, a station affiliated with Westchester Community College. In 1985, at age 19, Heyman began working as a photographer and subsequently as a producer and promoter at the New York City nightclub Studio 54.

== Professional wrestling career ==
=== Early interests and formative years (1970s–1986) ===
Heyman's interest in professional wrestling began in childhood and was solidified after watching a televised interview between Vince McMahon and "Superstar" Billy Graham. At the age of 13, he began photographing wrestling events in New York City and later invested in his own photo lab to develop and sell his work. He published The Wrestling Times Magazine, a self-produced newsletter, and contributed to wrestling periodicals such as Pro Wrestling Illustrated.

In 1980, at the age of 14, Heyman contacted Capitol Wrestling Corporation—the parent company of the WWWF—and secured a press pass for an event at Madison Square Garden. His presence at such events resulted in posed photographs with leading heel managers of the era, including Lou Albano, Fred Blassie, and The Grand Wizard. These images were later published by Pro Wrestling Illustrated, which characterized Heyman as having learned from the so-called "Three Wise Men" of heel management.

Heyman's proactive approach continued throughout his adolescence. He attended tapings for Jim Crockett Promotions, where he met Dusty Rhodes after entering a production meeting. In 1985, Heyman began working at Studio 54, initially as a photographer before being promoted to producer. That same year, he organized "Wrestle Party '85", a professional wrestling-themed event at the venue. The show featured the debut of Bam Bam Bigelow and included appearances by Ric Flair, Dusty Rhodes, and Magnum T.A., who were sent by Jim Crockett in response to Heyman's outreach.

=== Early managerial career (1987–1988) ===
Heyman made his managerial debut on January 2, 1987, with encouragement from Bigelow. He began working on the independent circuit in the Northeastern United States before joining Championship Wrestling from Florida (CWF) in February of that year. There, he aligned with Kevin Sullivan and Oliver Humperdink, adopting the ring name "Paul E. Dangerously"—a character inspired by Michael Keaton's role in Johnny Dangerously.

Following CWF's acquisition by Jim Crockett Promotions, Heyman transitioned to the Memphis-based Continental Wrestling Association (CWA), where he managed Tommy Rich and Austin Idol in a high-profile feud with Jerry Lawler. This storyline would later extend into the American Wrestling Association (AWA), where the Midnight Express (Dennis Condrey and Randy Rose) took over as Heyman's clients.

The Paul E. Dangerously persona—a brash, fast-talking New Yorker often seen with a mobile phone—was a theatrical extension of Heyman's own personality. The mobile phone, at the time an expensive status symbol, became a trademark prop and was occasionally used as a weapon during matches, a creative decision inspired by the character Gordon Gekko from Wall Street.

After leaving the AWA, Heyman returned to the CWA and formed an alliance with Eddie Gilbert and Missy Hyatt, engaging in a renewed feud with Lawler. Heyman subsequently joined the Alabama-based Continental Wrestling Federation, where Gilbert served as head booker and Heyman worked as his assistant. Concurrently, Heyman held the position of head booker for Windy City Wrestling in Chicago, further establishing his reputation as an innovative writer and producer of wrestling television.

=== National Wrestling Alliance / World Championship Wrestling (1988–1993) ===
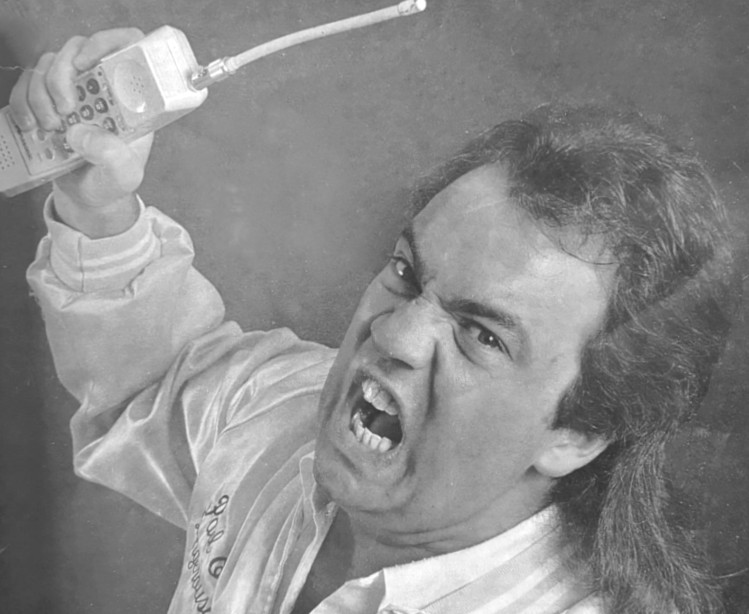
Heyman in a WCW promotional in 1988

In 1988, Heyman joined Jim Crockett Promotions, which soon became part of World Championship Wrestling (WCW). Reprising his Paul E. Dangerously persona, he managed the Original Midnight Express (Dennis Condrey and Randy Rose) in a storyline rivalry against the new incarnation of the team—Bobby Eaton and Stan Lane—who were aligned with manager Jim Cornette. During this period, Heyman also briefly managed "Mean" Mark Callous, the future Undertaker in WWE.

Although originally brought in as an on-screen manager, Heyman gradually transitioned into broadcasting. He became a color commentator alongside Jim Ross, calling matches for World Championship Wrestling on WTBS and other WCW programming. Heyman would later credit Ross with significantly shaping his understanding of wrestling presentation and production. Between stints with WCW, Heyman was briefly hired as a writer for International Championship Wrestling (ICW), but was dismissed during his first taping session.

In 1991, WCW sought to reestablish its heel roster and reintroduced Heyman as an on-screen manager. He was positioned as the leader of a new faction, the Dangerous Alliance, with Rick Rude as its focal point. The stable also included Arn Anderson, Bobby Eaton, Larry Zbyszko, and a young Steve Austin, among others. According to Heyman, he and Austin both considered Rude a mentor during this time. Under Heyman's management, Rude captured the United States Heavyweight Championship, while Anderson and Eaton won the World Tag Team Championship. The Dangerous Alliance was prominently featured throughout 1992 and was widely regarded as one of WCW's top villainous factions.

Heyman's tenure with WCW came to an end following backstage conflicts with then-booker Bill Watts. In early 1993, Heyman filed a lawsuit against WCW, alleging wrongful termination and ethnic discrimination. The matter was resolved privately out of court.

=== Leadership of Extreme Championship Wrestling (1993–2001) ===
After departing WCW in early 1993, Paul Heyman explored starting a new wrestling promotion in Texas with Jim Crockett Jr. However, the partnership was short-lived due to creative differences.

Later that year, Heyman joined Eastern Championship Wrestling (ECW), a Philadelphia-based promotion affiliated with the National Wrestling Alliance (NWA). The company was owned by local entrepreneur Tod Gordon and at the time was being booked by Eddie Gilbert. Heyman was initially brought in to assist with character development and promo coaching, particularly for younger talent. Following Gilbert's departure in September 1993, Heyman took over as ECW's head booker and assumed full creative control. He also returned to an on-screen role under his "Paul E. Dangerously" persona, managing wrestlers such as Sabu and 911.

In August 1994, ECW hosted a tournament to crown a new NWA World Heavyweight Champion. The NWA had intended to use the event to restore prestige to its title, with ECW's Shane Douglas selected as the planned winner. However, Heyman, Gordon, and Douglas orchestrated a controversial angle in which Douglas, after winning the final match, publicly rejected the NWA title and declared the ECW World Heavyweight Championship as the only belt he recognized. The moment effectively severed ECW's ties with the NWA.

Following the incident, the company rebranded as Extreme Championship Wrestling, dropping its NWA affiliation and "Eastern" label. Under Heyman's leadership, ECW developed a reputation for a gritty, hard-hitting style that blended elements of Japanese strong style, lucha libre, and hardcore wrestling. The promotion became known for its willingness to feature controversial subject matter and blur the lines between scripted storylines and real-life tensions. In May 1995, Heyman acquired Gordon's remaining interest in the promotion, becoming ECW's sole owner.

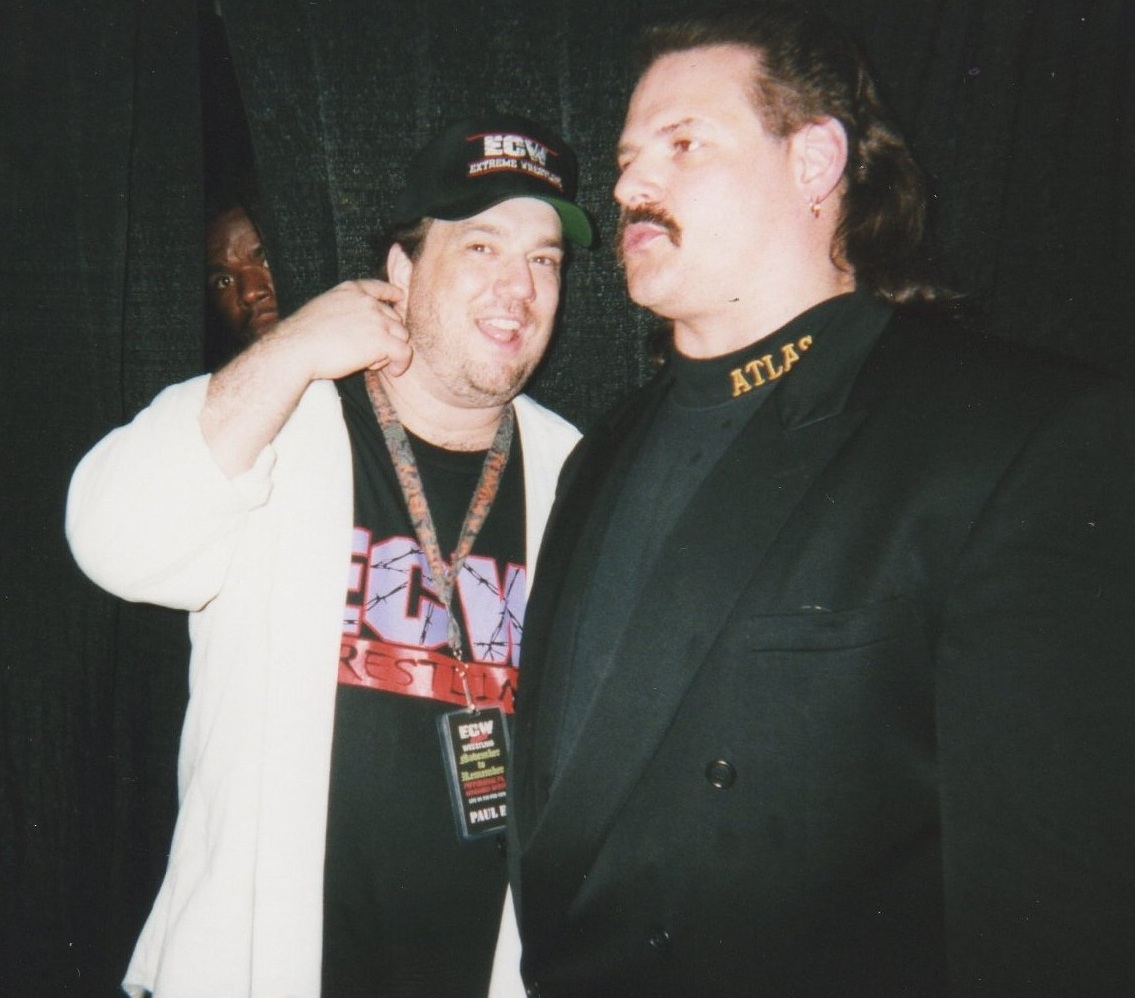
Heyman at an ECW show in 1998

Despite its anti-establishment image, ECW maintained informal ties with World Wrestling Federation (WWF) during the late 1990s. WWF chairman Vince McMahon allowed some of his underused or developmental talent to appear on ECW programming, including wrestlers such as 2 Cold Scorpio and Terry Gordy. Heyman has stated that McMahon paid him $1,000 per week to feature Scorpio. The relationship also extended to behind-the-scenes lobbying, with Heyman later claiming that McMahon encouraged cable executives to offer ECW a television deal. A potential agreement with USA Network fell through, reportedly after network president Stephen Chao was alerted to an internal WWF memo that undermined ECW's position.

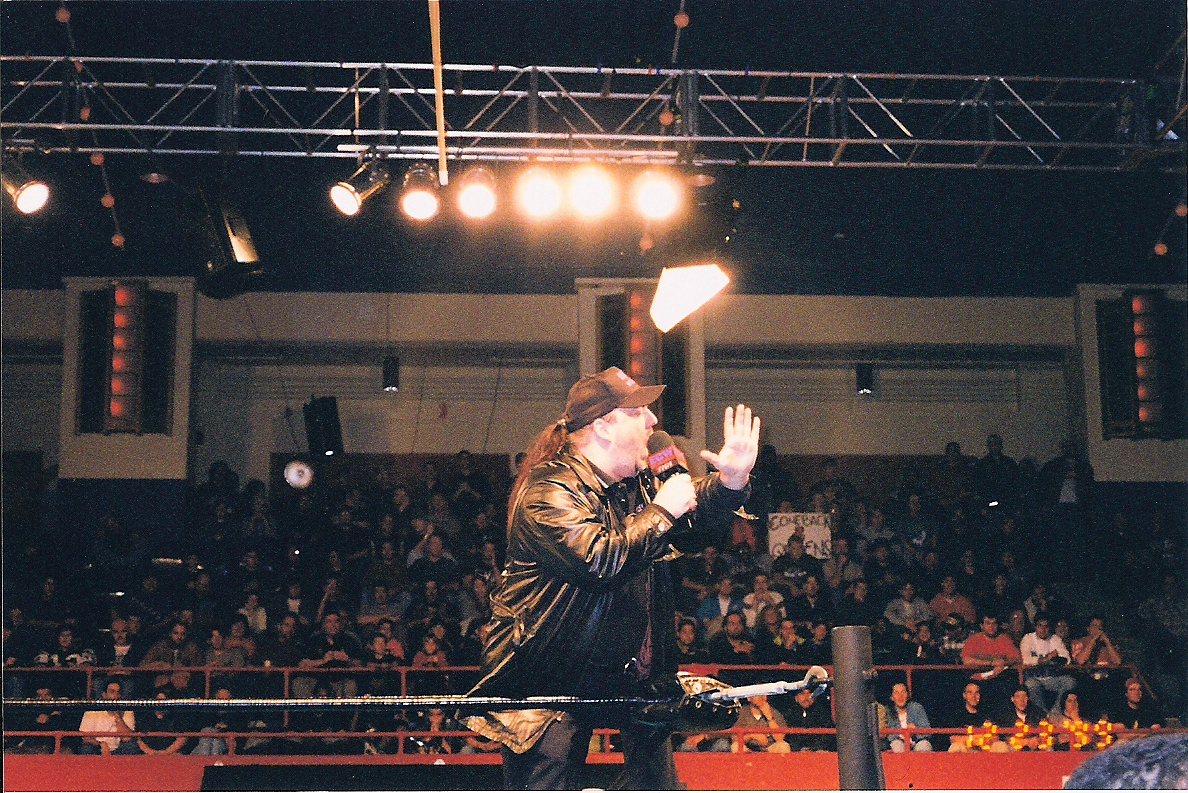
Heyman addressing the crowd at an ECW television taping in 1999

Although ECW became a launching pad for numerous future stars—including Taz, Rob Van Dam, the Dudley Boyz, and Tommy Dreamer—it struggled financially throughout its existence. The promotion's business model relied heavily on live event revenue, tape sales, and pay-per-view buys, with little corporate backing. By 2000, ECW had lost its national television slot on TNN and was facing mounting debts. Heyman gradually reduced his on-screen appearances and delegated day-to-day operations to Dreamer, while attempting to secure new financial backing and distribution deals.

Many performers later stated that they were unaware of the company's financial instability at the time, and several went unpaid during ECW's final months. The promotion held its last event on April 4, 2001, and formally filed for bankruptcy later that year, citing over $7 million in liabilities—including more than $3 million owed to pay-per-view distributor In Demand.

On January 28, 2003, World Wrestling Entertainment (WWE) acquired the remaining assets of ECW from the promotion's parent company, HHG Corporation, through a bankruptcy court settlement. The acquisition included ECW's video library, brand trademarks, and intellectual property, which would later be used in WWE-produced documentaries, events, and merchandise.

=== World Wrestling Federation/Entertainment (2001–2006) ===
==== The Alliance (2001–2002) ====
Following the closure of ECW in early 2001, Paul Heyman joined the World Wrestling Federation (WWF, later WWE). In March of that year, he replaced Jerry Lawler as a commentator on Raw Is War. Lawler had resigned after the company released his then-wife, Stacy "The Kat" Carter. Heyman resumed his long-standing on-air dynamic with Jim Ross, serving as a color commentator during a period of transition as WWF prepared to absorb both ECW and WCW talent.

In mid-2001, Heyman returned to an on-screen managerial role during the Invasion storyline, a company-wide angle that portrayed former WCW and ECW talent as outsiders challenging the WWF. As part of the angle, ECW was revived as a fictional faction, with Heyman cast as its spokesman. The ECW contingent later merged with Shane McMahon's WCW-aligned wrestlers to form "The Alliance." The storyline culminated at Survivor Series in November, where the WWF defeated The Alliance in a winner-takes-all elimination match. Following the conclusion of the angle, Heyman was written off television, and Lawler returned to the commentary team alongside Ross.

==== Association with Brock Lesnar, SmackDown! and Various Roles (2002–2005) ====
Behind the scenes, Heyman was appointed head writer of SmackDown! in July 2002. During his tenure, which lasted until February 2003, he oversaw a creative direction that focused on athletic competition and elevated several rising talents. According to Heyman and various WWE personnel, SmackDown! outperformed Raw in several key metrics during this period, including television ratings and live event attendance, despite internal creative competition between the brands.

Heyman also played a critical role in launching the career of Brock Lesnar. After being introduced to Lesnar by fellow wrestler Tazz, Heyman became an early mentor and advocate. When Lesnar debuted on the main roster in 2002, Heyman was assigned as his on-screen manager. Under Heyman's guidance, Lesnar quickly ascended to the main event scene, defeating The Rock at SummerSlam to become the youngest WWE Undisputed Champion at the time. The pairing established Heyman as Lesnar's primary spokesperson, a role he would reprise for much of the next two decades. However, in storyline, the alliance ended later that year when Heyman turned on Lesnar at Survivor Series and began managing Big Show.

In October 2003, Heyman returned to television as General Manager of SmackDown! following the departure of Stephanie McMahon's character, who had lost a match to Vince McMahon at No Mercy. His tenure as on-screen general manager continued until March 2004, when he was drafted to the Raw brand during that year's WWE Draft Lottery. Rather than work under Raw General Manager Eric Bischoff—whom Heyman blamed, both on-screen and in real-life interviews, for contributing to ECW's demise—he declined the assignment and was removed from television. His role as SmackDown! general manager was subsequently filled by Kurt Angle.

In mid-2005, Heyman was reassigned to WWE's developmental system, becoming the head writer and booker for Ohio Valley Wrestling (OVW), WWE's primary talent development territory at the time. While in OVW, Heyman developed a reputation for championing younger wrestlers and was notably supportive of CM Punk, advocating for his eventual promotion to WWE's main roster.

==== ECW revival and departure (2005–2006) ====
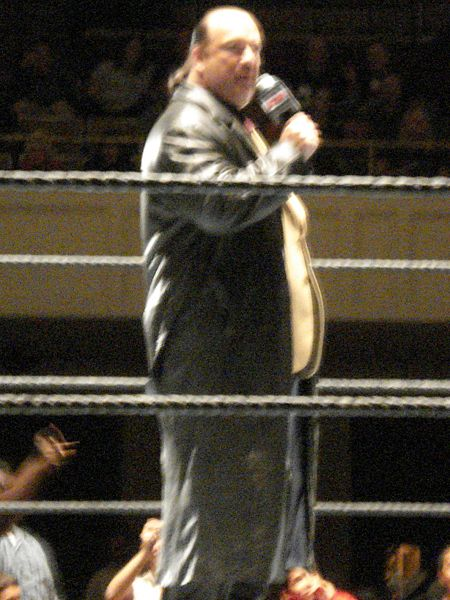
Heyman in the ring in 2006

Heyman returned to WWE programming on May 23, 2005, in a televised segment alongside Vince McMahon and Eric Bischoff to promote ECW One Night Stand, a pay-per-view event produced as a tribute to the original ECW. Held on June 12, 2005, at the Hammerstein Ballroom in New York City, the show featured former ECW wrestlers and was designed to celebrate the promotion's legacy. Heyman appeared on-screen as the face of the ECW brand and also contributed to the event's creative direction.

Following the event's success, WWE announced in mid-2006 that ECW would be revived as a full-time third brand, alongside Raw and SmackDown!. The relaunch was accompanied by a new weekly television program on the Sci Fi Channel (later Syfy), and Heyman returned to television as the on-screen "ECW Representative." Although his creative input backstage was reportedly limited, he was involved in helping to shape the early presentation of the show and its integration within WWE's existing structure.

As part of the brand relaunch, Heyman was given two storyline draft picks to help build the ECW roster, selecting Rob Van Dam from Raw and Kurt Angle from SmackDown!. Van Dam was subsequently positioned as the face of the new ECW brand. At ECW One Night Stand on June 11, 2006, Van Dam defeated John Cena to win the WWE Championship in a match billed under "ECW rules," which permitted no disqualifications. When the official referee was knocked out during the bout, Heyman entered the ring and counted the winning pinfall. On the premiere episode of ECW on Sci Fi, Heyman presented Van Dam with the reactivated ECW World Heavyweight Championship, and Van Dam was briefly recognized as a dual champion.

In the weeks that followed, Heyman transitioned to an antagonist role on television. On the July 4 episode of ECW, he assisted Big Show in defeating Van Dam for the ECW World Heavyweight Championship, signaling a character shift that coincided with growing creative tension behind the scenes.

Heyman's tenure with WWE came to an end later that year. On December 4, following the December to Dismember pay-per-view, WWE issued a statement indicating that Heyman had been sent home by Vince McMahon. While the official explanation cited declining television ratings and internal dissatisfaction, multiple reports pointed to significant creative disagreements between Heyman and McMahon regarding the event's booking.

Heyman had reportedly advocated for CM Punk to emerge as a major star at the pay-per-view, proposing that Punk eliminate Big Show via submission early in the main event's Extreme Elimination Chamber match. Big Show was said to have supported the idea, but McMahon rejected it, opting instead for Punk to be eliminated early.

According to multiple accounts, the tension between Heyman and McMahon culminated in a heated exchange aboard McMahon's private jet after the pay-per-view. Heyman was removed from the ECW creative team shortly thereafter and ceased appearing on WWE programming. Though he remained under contract for several weeks, he reportedly declined an offer from Stephanie McMahon to return as a writer for WWE's developmental territory. On December 17, Heyman officially parted ways with the company.

=== Return to WWE (2012–present) ===
==== On-screen partnerships (2012–2014) ====
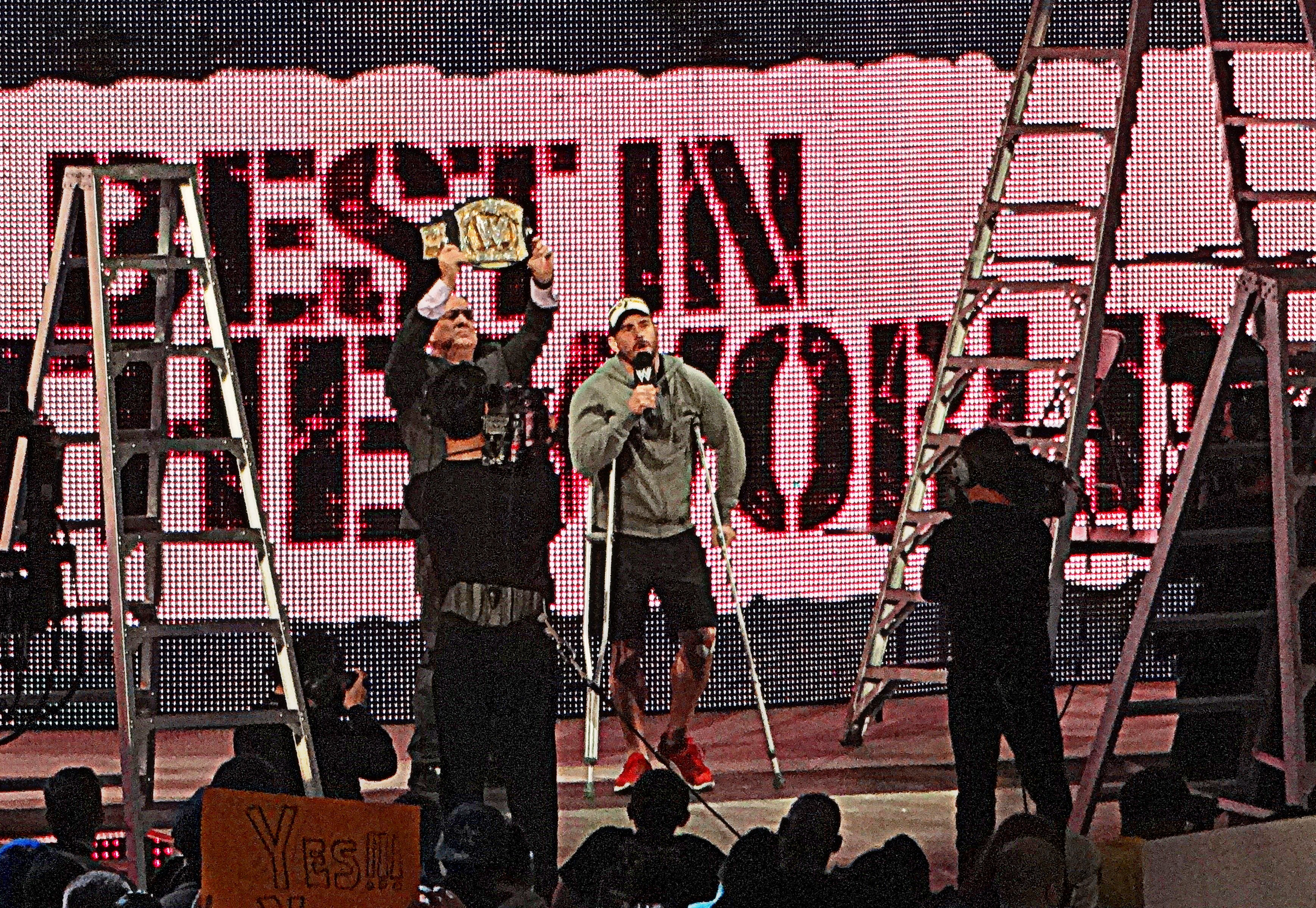
Heyman brandishing the WWE Championship on behalf of champion CM Punk in December 2012

After several years away from WWE, Paul Heyman returned to television in May 2012 as the on-screen legal representative of Brock Lesnar, who had re-signed with the company following a successful stint in the UFC. Lesnar specifically requested Heyman's return to serve as his spokesperson, citing Heyman's ability to elevate his presentation through promos and narrative storytelling. Heyman quickly re-established himself as a major presence on WWE programming, guiding Lesnar through his feud with Triple H. Later in 2012, Heyman began an on-screen partnership with WWE Champion CM Punk. Although the alliance was fictional, it was built on real-life mutual respect, as Heyman had previously supported Punk's rise within the company. Heyman accompanied Punk during his extended title reign, often contributing to his promos and adding dramatic weight to his matches. This period helped solidify Heyman's reputation as one of the industry's most compelling orators.

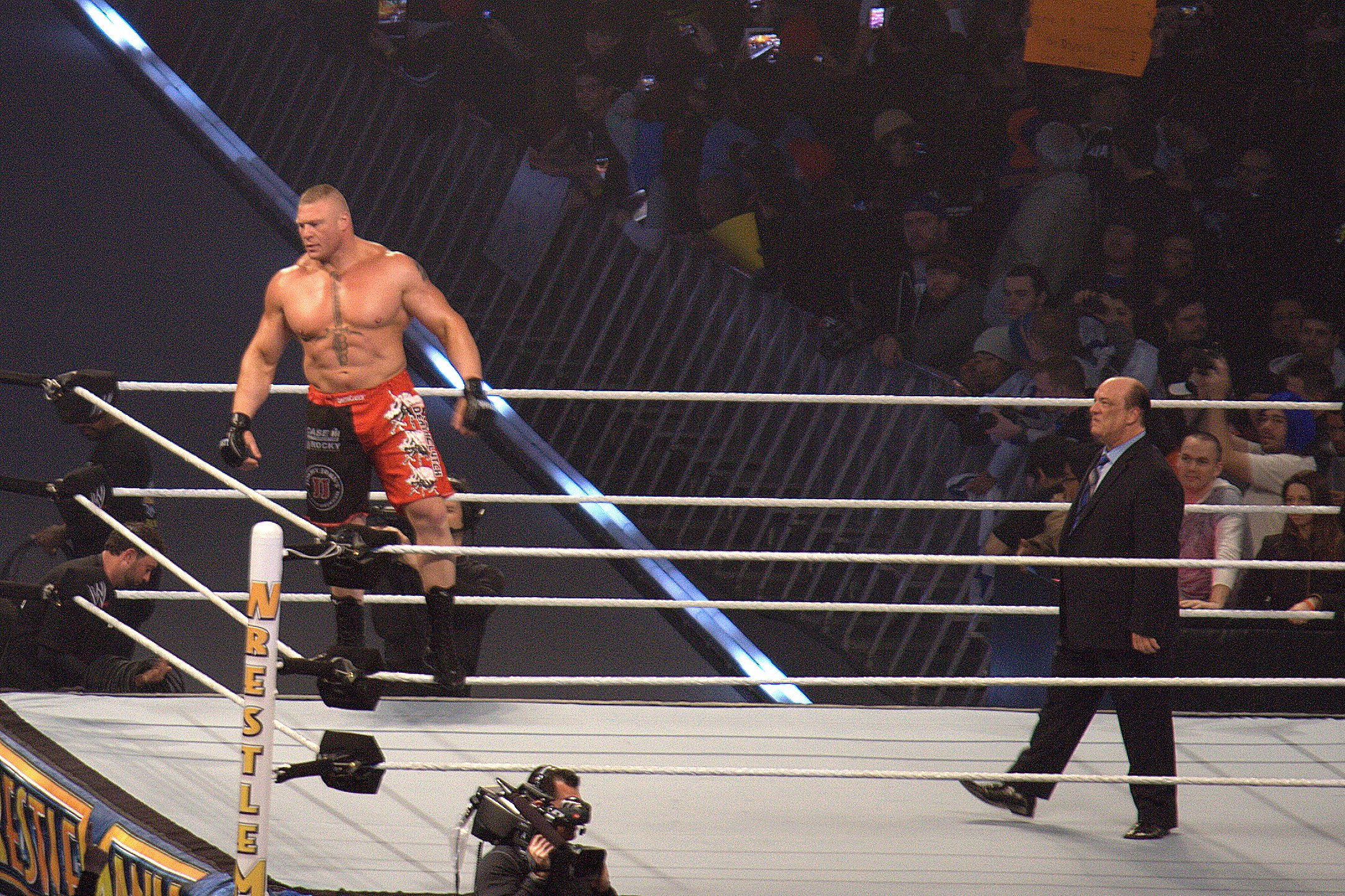
Heyman (right) and his client Brock Lesnar at WrestleMania 29

Heading into WrestleMania 29 in 2013, Heyman simultaneously managed both Punk and Lesnar, each featured in top-tier matches. Later that year, he introduced Curtis Axel as a new client, briefly managing him to an Intercontinental Championship victory. Around the same time, Heyman's on-screen relationship with Punk unraveled in a long-running storyline that culminated in Lesnar defeating Punk at SummerSlam in a match widely praised by critics and fans.

During the conclusion of the Punk rivalry, Heyman aligned with Ryback for a short-lived program and then resumed his role exclusively managing Lesnar. In early 2014, the two began a feud with The Undertaker, leading to WrestleMania XXX, where Lesnar famously ended The Undertaker's 21–0 undefeated streak. The result was considered one of the most shocking outcomes in WWE history and significantly elevated Lesnar's character as a dominant force, with Heyman playing a central role in amplifying the impact through post-match promos and television appearances.

Shortly after WrestleMania, Heyman was paired with Cesaro following his victory in the inaugural André the Giant Memorial Battle Royal. Despite initial momentum, the alliance was underutilized creatively and ended within a few months without a major storyline payoff.

==== Continued association with Brock Lesnar and executive role (2014–2020) ====
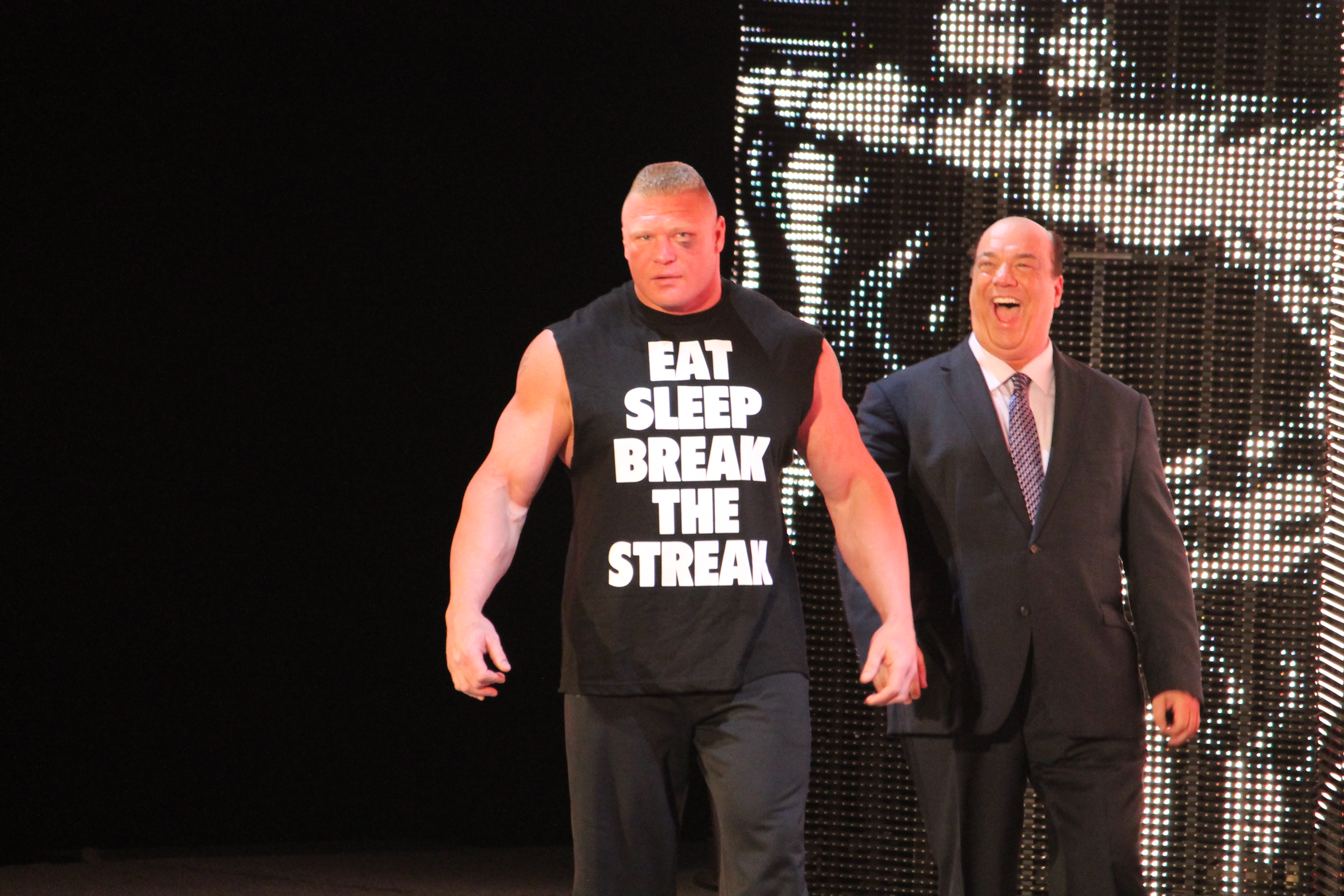
Heyman with Lesnar in April 2014

Paul Heyman resumed his role as the on-screen advocate for Brock Lesnar, who defeated John Cena in dominant fashion at SummerSlam to win the WWE World Heavyweight Championship. Heyman's promo work during this period was widely praised for amplifying Lesnar's presentation as an unstoppable force and helping reestablish him as one of WWE's top attractions.

Heyman remained central to Lesnar's onscreen storylines throughout his title reign and subsequent feuds, including those with Seth Rollins and Roman Reigns. At WrestleMania 31 in 2015, Lesnar lost the championship when Rollins cashed in his Money in the Bank contract mid-match. Lesnar's subsequent (scripted) suspension wrote him off television, but he and Heyman returned later that year for a renewed rivalry with The Undertaker. The two concluded their feud with Lesnar defeating Undertaker at Hell in a Cell.

As part of WWE's 2016 brand extension, Lesnar and Heyman were drafted to Raw. That year, Heyman accompanied Lesnar through matches with Dean Ambrose at WrestleMania 32 and Randy Orton at SummerSlam. Toward the end of 2016, Lesnar entered a new rivalry with returning Goldberg. Despite an initial loss at Survivor Series, Lesnar later defeated Goldberg at WrestleMania 33 to capture the Universal Championship.

Between 2017 and 2018, Heyman served as Lesnar's advocate during a 504-day reign as Universal Champion. In storyline, Heyman and Lesnar briefly teased a falling out in mid-2018, which was later revealed to be a deception leading into SummerSlam, where Roman Reigns ended Lesnar's title reign. Heyman remained part of Lesnar's presentation during his pursuit of the championship, including appearances at Hell in a Cell and Crown Jewel, where Lesnar reclaimed the vacant title following Reigns's real-life leukemia diagnosis.

In 2019, Heyman continued his role at WrestleMania 35, where Lesnar lost the Universal Championship to Seth Rollins in the show's opening match. That same year, WWE appointed Heyman as Executive Director of Raw, giving him backstage responsibility for the brand's creative direction. Heyman was removed from the position in June 2020 and replaced by Bruce Prichard, though would continue to be involved in the creative team as an advisor.

Heyman continued to manage Lesnar until early 2020 when Lesnar lost the WWE Championship to Drew McIntyre at WrestleMania 36. The match was held without a live audience due to the COVID-19 pandemic. Lesnar's WWE contract expired shortly thereafter, marking the end of their decade-long partnership—at least temporarily—and leading to a period of inactivity for both men.

==== The Wiseman (2020–2025) ====
Paul Heyman returned to WWE programming in August 2020, aligning with Roman Reigns shortly after Reigns's return from a medical hiatus. Rebranded as the "Wiseman" and Reigns' "special counsel," Heyman played a pivotal on-screen role in the character reinvention of Reigns, who adopted a dominant, antagonistic persona. Heyman also contributed behind the scenes to the creative direction of the long-running Bloodline faction and its storylines, which featured Reigns as the "Tribal Chief" and incorporated members of the Anoa'i wrestling family, including The Usos and Solo Sikoa.

Heyman was a prominent figure during Reigns's record-breaking run as Universal Champion, regularly appearing at ringside and in backstage segments. His character, often caught between loyalty and manipulation, added dramatic complexity to the evolving Bloodline narrative. Reigns's reign included high-profile title defenses, including victories over Brock Lesnar, Daniel Bryan, Edge, and John Cena. In late 2021, Heyman's allegiance became a focal point of storyline tension, particularly during Reigns's feud with Lesnar. After briefly being written off television in December, Heyman reunited with Lesnar at Day 1 in January 2022. However, just weeks later at the Royal Rumble, Heyman betrayed Lesnar and rejoined Reigns, allowing Bobby Lashley to win the WWE Championship in a storyline twist.

The angle culminated in a Winner-Takes-All Championship Unification match at WrestleMania 38, where Reigns defeated WWE Champion Lesnar to become the Undisputed WWE Universal Champion. Heyman continued in his role as Reigns's advisor and adopted the additional title of "Wise Man," serving as a central voice in the Bloodline's presentation.

Throughout 2022 and 2023, Heyman remained by Reigns's side during a dominant title reign that included a successful defense against Cody Rhodes in the main event of WrestleMania 39. Reigns eventually lost the championship to Rhodes at WrestleMania XL in April 2024, ending a historic 1,316-day reign. Shortly before the event, Heyman was announced as the first inductee into the WWE Hall of Fame Class of 2024 and was formally inducted during WrestleMania weekend. In June 2024, Heyman turned face following a storyline attack by The Bloodline, which was now under the leadership of Solo Sikoa.

Heyman returned to television in November 2024 and revealed CM Punk as a surprise addition to Reigns's team for Survivor Series: WarGames. Following the event, Heyman resumed managing Reigns independently of The Bloodline faction.

==== The Oracle (2025–present) ====
In April 2025, it was revealed on SmackDown that Heyman would accompany CM Punk—not Reigns—to WrestleMania 41, honoring a storyline agreement the two had made following their alliance at Survivor Series. At WrestleMania 41, Heyman betrayed both Reigns and Punk, reverting to a heel and allowing Seth Rollins to pin Reigns and in turn aligning himself with Rollins. Rollins and Heyman created The Vision stable, also including Bron Breakker and Bronson Reed while Heyman changed his nickname to "the Oracle". At Wrestlepalooza, Heyman reunited with his long time client Brock Lesnar and introduced him before his match with John Cena. On the October 13 episode of Raw following Crown Jewel, Breakker and Reed attacked Rollins exiling him from the stable. In December 2025, Logan Paul and Austin Theory joined The Vision.

On April 19, 2026, at WrestleMania 42, Heyman accompanied Lesnar for his match against Oba Femi, which Lesnar lost. After the match, Lesnar left his boots and gloves in the ring before embracing Heyman, seemingly retiring from professional wrestling. However, Lesnar would return a month later and Heyman would accompany him in his victory over Femi at Clash in Italy on May 31. On the July 13 episode of Raw, Heyman abandoned the Vision. At Night 1 of SummerSlam on August 1, Heyman accompanied Lesnar for his third match against Femi which was contested inside Hell in a Cell, Lesnar lost to Femi in what would be his final match in professional wrestling as he officially announced his retirement on The Pat McAfee Show on August 4.

== Reception and legacy ==
Heyman's work as a promoter and booker has been praised by many wrestling fellows and critics. Former ECW World Heavyweight Champion Raven called him "the most creative genius the business has ever seen". Raven's description of Heyman as a "genius" was echoed by Tazz and Jim Cornette. Heyman has been described as the best orator in professional wrestling. Heyman's skills were praised by his former broadcast partner Jim Ross, who stated: "He was a really good antagonist because sometimes the best antagonists are the villains that say things that you know are true but you just don't want to hear them. Heyman had the ability to tell his version of the truth, [he was] plausible. He just wasn't a heel getting himself over, he got talent over and did a great job."

== Other media and endeavors ==
Heyman is the co-founder of the award-winning New York City firm The Looking4Larry Agency. The firm broke new ground with its initial campaign with Electronic Arts, THQ video games, 2K Sports, the Hard Rock Hotel, and Casino Las Vegas. Heyman also worked with Brock Lesnar, collaborating with him on Lesnar's autobiography, Death Clutch: My Story of Determination, Domination, and Survival. He has appeared in the video games WWE Day of Reckoning, WWE SmackDown! vs. Raw, WWE 2K14, WWE 2K15, WWE 2K16, WWE 2K17, WWE 2K18, WWE 2K19, WWE 2K20, WWE 2K22, WWE 2K23, WWE 2K24, WWE 2K25 as a cover star and WWE 2K26.

Heyman portrayed a sports announcer in 2002's Rollerball, and an uncredited role in the WWE film Countdown. After a family emergency forced the original actor to pull out, he was chosen by I Am Legend executive producer Michael Tadross to play "Gino" in the film adaptation of the long-running Off-Broadway show Tony n' Tina's Wedding.

== Personal life ==
In 2001, Heyman married Marla, a businesswoman and entrepreneur. They had two children. Paul and Marla divorced in 2004 after nearly 3 years of marriage.

Heyman rarely sleeps more than three to four hours per night. He is a film enthusiast who cites Angels with Dirty Faces (1938) and Léon: The Professional (1994) as his favorite films, and a great admirer of punk musician Henry Rollins, whom he described as "one of the most underrated social commentators out there".

== Awards and accomplishments ==
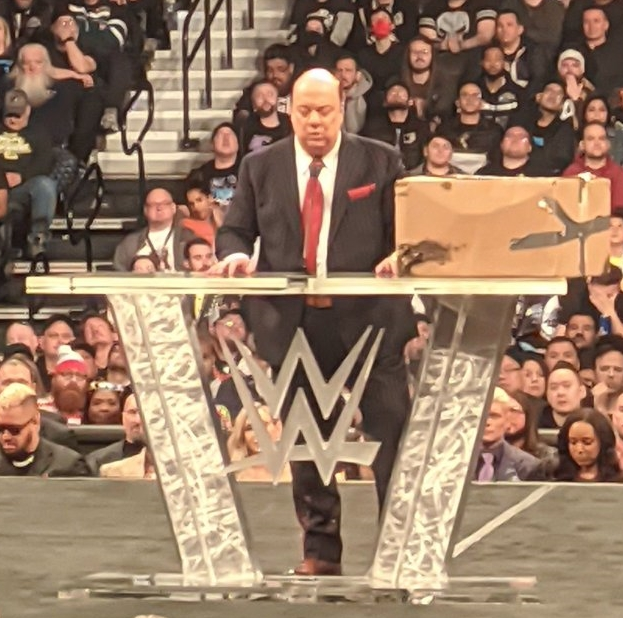
Heyman was inducted into the WWE Hall of Fame in 2024

- ESPN
  - Best Promo Artist (2025)
- Inside The Ropes Magazine
  - Manager of the Year (2020)
- Pro Wrestling Illustrated
  - Faction of the Year (2022) – with The Bloodline
  - Manager of the Year (1992)
- WWE
  - WWE Hall of Fame (Class of 2024)
  - WWE Year-End Award (1 time)
    - Best on the Mic (2018)
  - Slammy Award (1 time)
    - Mic Drop of the Year (2024) – Telling Cody Rhodes that his father, Dusty Rhodes, told him that "Roman Reigns was the son he always wanted" on Raw (February 6, 2023)
- Wrestling Observer Newsletter
  - Feud of the Year (2023) as part of The Bloodline vs. Kevin Owens and Sami Zayn
  - Best Color Commentator (1991)
  - Best Booker (1994–1997, 2002)
  - Best on Interviews (2013–2014)
  - Best Non-Wrestler (2001, 2002, 2004, 2012–2014, 2018, 2019, 2021, 2022, 2024)
  - Best Non-Wrestler of the Decade (2010s)
  - Best on Interviews of the Decade (2010s)
  - Most Disgusting Promotional Tactic (2012) Angle with CM Punk, exploiting Jerry Lawler's real-life heart attack, playing footage of him near death
  - Wrestling Observer Newsletter Hall of Fame (Class of 2005)
