= Laya, the Witch of Red Pooh =

- Genre: Humor/comedy; Magic
- Author: Yo Yo
- English publisher: (United States) Tokyopop

Laya, the Witch of Red Pooh is a manhwa series by Yo Yo. The series is licensed in English in the United States and Canada by Tokyopop.

The series stars Laya Han, a witch who procrastinates, and her cat Puss, who smokes cigarettes. Other characters that are seen dropping in and out throughout are Snowy, a crow who is able to transform into a human, and Nicky, Laya's free-loading friend.

The story is split up into a series of unconnected, and often random, four page tales.
