= Lea Cohen =

Bulgarian musicologist, diplomat and novelist (born 1942)

- Леа Коен
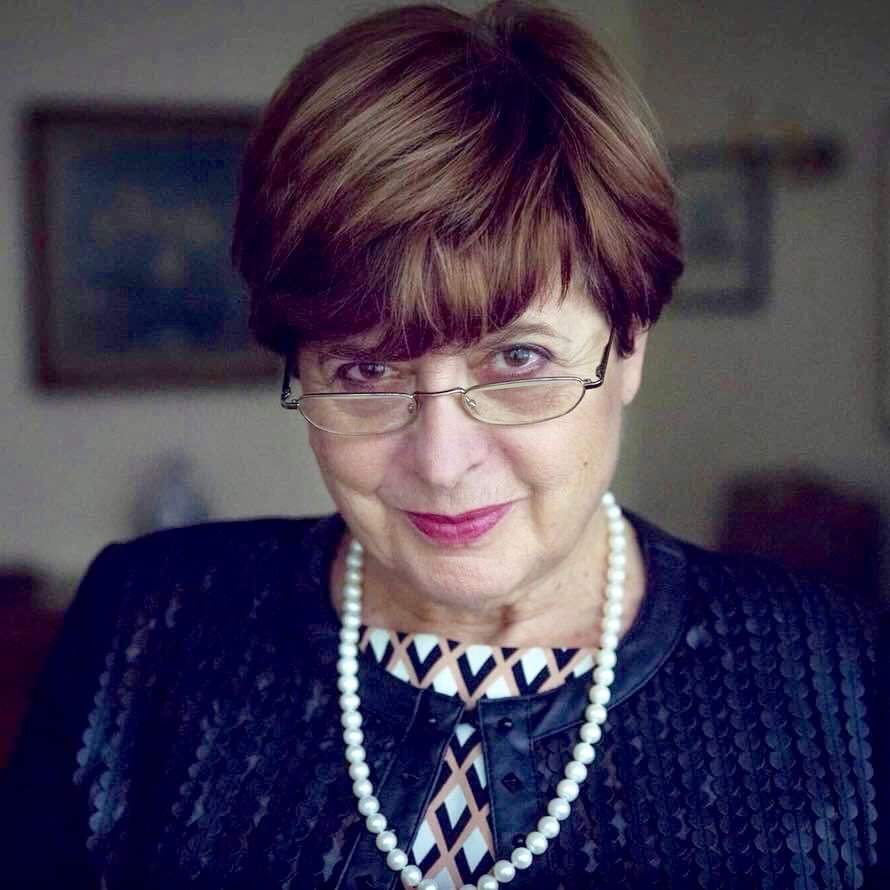
- Born: 29 June 1942 (age 84); Sofia, Bulgaria
- Education: Utrecht University; Bulgarian State Conservatory
- Occupations: Writer, musicologist, diplomat
- Writing career
- Language: Bulgarian

Lea Cohen (Bulgarian: Леа Коен; born 1942), also known as Lea Koen, is a Bulgarian novelist, musicologist, and diplomat. In the 1990s, she was Bulgaria's Ambassador to the European Union. She also served as the ambassador to Belgium, Luxembourg, and NATO. Cohen studied music history at Utrecht University in the Netherlands. She directed the Sofia Philharmonic Orchestra from 1975 to 1979. She has written over 11 novels and books.

== Early life and education ==
Lea Cohen was born in Sofia on 29 June 1942 into a family of lawyers. Her father, Iosif Koen, was one of the Jewish people forced to labor at a highway-building project near Ihtiman during World War II. Following the 1944 Communist coup in Bulgaria, her father became the presiding judge (chair) of the Second Panel of the so-called People’s Court in Sliven. After completing her secondary education, she studied musicology and piano at the Bulgarian State Conservatory in Sofia. She then studied music history, earning her doctorate from Utrecht University in the Netherlands.

== Career ==
Cohen worked for the Bulgarian Music magazine as an editor and taught in Plovdiv at the Higher Music Institute. In 1967 she travelled to Moscow and tried to meet with Edison Denisov. She directed the Sofia Philharmonic Orchestra from 1975 to 1979. She was the executive director and chief playwright of the Sofia Music Weeks festival.

Following the fall of Communism in Bulgaria in 1989, Cohen became involved in politics and diplomacy. She was elected as a deputy in the Great National Assembly in June 1990. In April 1991, Cohen was appointed Bulgaria's special ambassador to the European Union. From 1991 to 1993, she was also an ambassador to Belgium and Luxembourg. She continued working as a diplomat with NATO and the Western European Union from 1993 to 1996, and with Switzerland and Liechtenstein from 1997 to 2001.

Cohen authored several books on musicology, avant-garde music, and musical figures such as Claude Debussy, Lyubomir Pipkov, and Paul Hindemith. Her books include Paul Hindemith (1967), Lubomir Pipkov (1969), and Monsieur Croche et Monsieur Débussy (1988). Koen has also written 11 novels and one play. Her fourth novel, The Strategem, was nominated for Best Bulgarian Novel in 2006.

She has served as president of the Bulgarian Jewish Community. She wrote the 2023 book Salvation, Persecution, and the Holocaust in the Kingdom of Bulgaria (1940-1944).

== Personal life ==
Cohen was married to Vladimir Božkov. She lives in La Chaux-de-Fonds, Switzerland, and Sofia. She remarried to Swiss politician Charles Augsburger.

== Criticisms ==
In her article for the magazine "Biograph" from 2011, she denounced unconditionally as "conquering" all the wars waged by the Bulgarian state in the period 1912 - 1944, even when they were waged for territories not only with a Bulgarian ethnic majority, but also for such, decades before that part of the territory of the modern Bulgarian state (such as Southern Dobrudja), while at the same time not blaming Serbia and Greece for the conquest of 90% of Macedonia in alliance with Bulgaria during the First Balkan War, and keeping silent about the atrocities against the Bulgarian population in Macedonia, Thrace and Dobruja after the Second Balkan War, and after the First World War- also in the Western Outlands.

== Selected works ==
=== Novels ===
- The Short Eternity of Alma M (1997)
- Florida (1998)
- Alternus Consortium (2005)
- The Presidential Candidate (2006)
- Close Connection (2007)
- The Chaser of Sounds (2008)
- Bye Bye, Brussels (2011)
- You Believe: Eight Views on the Holocaust in the Balkans (2012)
- Love's Hunters (2014)
- Raphael (2017)
- Salvation, Persecution, and the Holocaust in the Kingdom of Bulgaria (1940-1944) (2023)

=== Plays ===
- Bitter Cherries (1999)
