= Lea Heidbreder =

German politician (born 1991)

Member of the Landtag of Rhineland-Palatinate
- Incumbent
- Assumed office 18 May 2021

Personal details
- Born: 26 March 1991 (age 35) Bielefeld
- Party: Alliance 90/The Greens (since 2013)

Lea Heidbreder (born 26 March 1991 in Bielefeld) is a German politician serving as a member of the Landtag of Rhineland-Palatinate since 2021. She has served as group leader of Alliance 90/The Greens in the city council of Landau since 2019.
