= Leia Stirling =

American academic

Leia Abigail Stirling
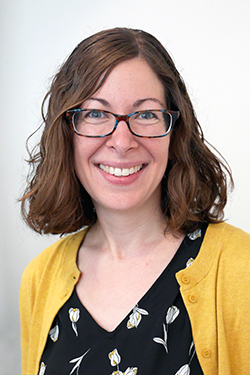
- Born: Leia Abigail Blumenthal
- Education: University of Illinois at Urbana–Champaign; Massachusetts Institute of Technology
- Scientific career
- Workplaces: Massachusetts Institute of Technology

Leia Abigail Stirling (née Blumenthal) (born 1981) is the Charles Stark Draper Professor of Aeronautics at Massachusetts Institute of Technology, where she is the co-director of the human systems laboratory. She was elected an American Association for the Advancement of Science Leshner Leadership Institute Fellow in 2019.

== Early life and education ==
Stirling studied engineering at the University of Illinois at Urbana–Champaign, completing her master's degree in 2005. She earned her PhD at Massachusetts Institute of Technology in 2008. After graduating, Stirling completed a postdoctoral fellowship at the Boston Children's Hospital. She moved to the Wyss Institute for Biologically Inspired Engineering at Harvard University in 2009, where she worked as director of the Motion Capture Laboratory. There, she worked on robotic devices that could improve the function of the hands of people who had suffered from stroke or cerebral palsy.

== Research and career ==
Stirling joined Massachusetts Institute of Technology in 2013, where she co-directs the Human Systems Laboratory. She works on human–computer interaction and computational dynamics. She seeks to quantify the fluency of humans and machines in tightly coupled systems through the use of wearable sensors. She works on how to map wearable sensor information to a visible display. This information can help in the design of spacesuits, as well as helping people who have sensory disorders identify ways to interact with their environment. In the design of spacesuits, Stirling has studied whether haptic feedback could be used to help astronauts feel around their environments. Amongst these sensors, Stirling is interested in using them for the rehabilitation of stroke patients. Stirling believes that the development of high fidelity sensors will help rehabilitation survivors monitor their well-being and performance.

Stirling is interested in the use of exoskeletons for humans to enhance performance and reduce workplace injuries. Whilst exoskeletons have been proposed for use in the military, Stirling identified that they can reduce a soldier's response times. Stirling serves on the ASTM International F48 Committee on Exoskeletons and Exosuits.

In 2019, Stirling was selected as an American Association for the Advancement of Science Leshner Leadership Institute Fellow. She leads public engagement activities at the MIT Museum, including leading a wearable technology challenge for teachers and high school students.
