= Liya =

Liya may refer to:

== People ==
- Liya Akhedzhakova (born 1938), Soviet and Russian film, stage and voice actress
- Liya Brooks (born 2005), American professional footballer
- Liya Kebede (born 1978), Ethiopian-born model, maternal health advocate, clothing designer, and actress
- Liya (musician) (born 1999), Nigerian singer and songwriter
- Ai Liya (born 1965), Chinese film and television actress
- Ji Liya (born 1981), Chinese gymnast
- Liya Nurkina (born 1984), Kazakhstani taekwondo practitioner
- Liya Shakirova (1921–2015), Soviet and Russian linguist
- Tong Liya (born 1983), Chinese actress

== Other ==
- Lia, Iran (also Liya), a village in Dashtabi-ye Sharqi Rural District, Dashtabi District, Buin Zahra County, Qazvin Province
