= Laya, Guinea =

Layah
- Village
- Location in Guinea
- Coordinates: 9°17′12″N 13°16′44″W
- Country: Guinea
- Region: Kindia Region
- Prefecture: Forécariah Prefecture
- Time zone: UTC+0 (GMT)

Laya or Layah is a village in the Forécariah Prefecture in the Kindia Region of southwestern Guinea.
