= Lya =

Lya or LYA may refer to:

- Luoyang Beijiao Airport (code LYA), an airport serves Luoyang, China
- Lya (DC Comics), a fictional character
- Lya (name), a feminine given name
- Lyman-alpha line (Lyα), a spectral line of hydrogen
- Lithuanian Special Archives (abbreviation LYA), an archive of KGB documents in Lithuania
