= LIA =

Lia or LIA may refer to:

== Places ==
- Lia, Iran, a village in Dashtabi-ye Sharqi Rural District, Dashtabi District, Buin Zahra County, Qazvin Province, Iran
- Lia, Norway, a village in Sør-Fron municipality in Innlandet county, Norway
- LIA, the IATA code for Liangping Airport
- Lija, a small village in the Central Region of Malta

== Organisations ==
- Laser Institute of America, international society for laser applications and safety
- Lead Industries Association, a defunct industry trade group
- Libyan Investment Authority
- London Irish Amateur, an English Rugby Union team
- Long Island Association, a business lobby or coalition founded in the 1920s
- Love In Action, former name of the Christian ex-gay organization Restoration Path

== Science and technology ==
- Language Independent Arithmetic, a series of standards on computer arithmetic
- Late Iron Age, an archaeological period
- Little Ice Age, a period of regional cooling between the 14th and 19th centuries
- Lock-in amplifier, a type of amplifier

== Other uses ==
- Lia, a feminine given name (including a list of people with the name)
- Lia (food), a rice-based dish in Orissa, India
- Línea Internacional Aérea, a defunct Ecuadorian airline

== See also ==
- Lias (disambiguation)
