= Lia Maivia =

Samoan professional wrestling promoter (1931–2008)

- Born: Ofelia Fuataga; 6 August 1931 (Note: Some sources reported after her death that she was 81 when she died, making her birth year 1927. However, Maivia's headstone displays a birth year of 1931 and most sources reported her age at her death as 77.); Lalomanu, Aleipata, Samoa
- Died: 19 October 2008 (aged 77); Davie, Florida, U.S.
- Occupation: Professional wrestling promoter
- Years active: 1982–2008
- Spouse: Peter Maivia (m. 1953; died 1982)
- Children: 3
- Relatives: Dwayne Johnson (grandson)

Ofelia "Lia" Maivia (née Fuataga; 6 August 1927 – 19 October 2008) was a Samoan professional wrestling promoter. Maivia was the wife of Samoan professional wrestler Peter Maivia and the grandmother of wrestler and actor, Dwayne Johnson, also known as The Rock. Lia Maivia had an uncredited role in the Magnum, P.I. episode "Mr. White Death". She played herself in her real life job as a wrestling promoter.

== Professional wrestling career ==
Maivia took over Polynesian Pro Wrestling (PPW), a territory of the National Wrestling Alliance in Hawaii, following the death of her husband, "High Chief" Peter Maivia, in 1982. She became one of wrestling's first female promoters. In the mid-1980s, her promotion ran a show called Polynesian Pacific Pro Wrestling on the Financial News Network. Her biggest card, A Hot Summer Night, occurred on 3 August 1985, and had a crowd of 20,000. Her show the following year, A Hot Summer Night II, did not do as well, and the promotion began to decline. Maivia, her booker Lars Anderson, and Ati So'O faced extortion charges from a competing Hawaiian promotion, but were acquitted in November 1989. PPW closed in 1988.

In 2018, Maivia's grandson, Dwayne Johnson gave an interview on The Late Show with Stephen Colbert, in which Johnson recounts that his grandfather 'High Chief' Peter Maivia, at the beginning of his career, never told his wife of the choreography of wrestling, leading Maivia to believe it was "real fighting". When Johnson's grandfather was in a match in San Francisco, and was getting beaten by his opponent, Lia Maivia came into the ring, and started beating her husband's opponent with her wooden clog shoe leading Peter Maivia to shout in Samoan to stop beating his opponent up and that the opponent was Maivia's friend.

In April 2024, she was posthumously inducted into the 2024 WWE Hall of Fame by her grandson The Rock.

== Personal life ==
Maivia was born the daughter of Aulaumea Sanitoa Aulaumea and Talaleu Soesa Fuataga of Lalomanu, Samoa. Maivia had one daughter, Mataniu Feagaimaleata "Ata" Fitisemanu, with her first husband Sione Papali'i Fitisemanu. After she married her second husband Peter Maivia, he adopted her daughter Ata and changed Ata's last name to Maivia. Ata and her third husband Rocky Johnson are the parents of Dwayne "The Rock" Johnson.

Maivia died of a heart attack at her home in Davie, Florida, on 19 October 2008. There were conflicting reports of her age, as most outlets reported that she was 81 years old, while The Miami Herald reported that she was 77. Her headstone displays a birth year of 1931, making her age at death 77. The Anoaʻi family established the "Lia Maivia Scholarship" in her honor.

Bill Apter, a writer and journalist who specializes in wrestling, wrote of Maivia following her death: "When my daughter Hailey, who is now 23, met Lia at a wrestling event in upper New York state, Lia went to a gift shop at a nearby hotel and bought Hailey a stuffed rabbit as a gift. She had never met her before this day, and this shows what a heart she had!" Greg Oliver, another professional wrestling journalist, wrote that Maivia "was considered a strong-willed businesswoman, demanding and challenging of her employees."

Her life is featured in most episodes of Young Rock, an autobiographical series based on the life of Dwayne Johnson. In the series, she's portrayed by Ana Tuisila.

== Awards and accomplishments ==
- WWE
  - WWE Hall of Fame (Class of 2024)
