= National Register of Historic Places listings in Bristol County, Massachusetts =

Map of Massachusetts highlighting Bristol County

List of Registered Historic Places in Bristol County, Massachusetts:

Contents: Counties in Massachusetts

Barnstable | Berkshire | Bristol | Dukes | Essex | Franklin | Hampden | Hampshire | Middlesex | Nantucket | Norfolk | Plymouth | Suffolk | Worcester

This National Park Service list is complete through NPS recent listings posted November 6, 2026.

== Cities and towns listed separately ==
Due to their large number of listings, some community listings are in separate articles, listed in this table.

| Area | Image | First Date listed | Last Date listed | Count |
|---|---|---|---|---|
| Fall River | | July 2, 1973 | February 6, 2026 | 109 |
| New Bedford | | November 13, 1966 | April 28, 2014 | 42 |
| Taunton | | December 16, 1977 | February 3, 2025 | 97 |

== Other cities and towns ==
| | Name on the Register | Image | Date listed | Location | City or town | Description |
|---|---|---|---|---|---|---|
| 1 | Elisha Allen House | Elisha Allen House | June 6, 1983 (#83000616) | 108 Homestead Ave. 41°52′51″N 71°16′09″W | Rehoboth | |
| 2 | Anawan Club Clubhouse and Caretaker's House | Anawan Club Clubhouse and Caretaker's House | June 6, 1983 (#83000618) | 13 Gorham St. 41°49′35″N 71°13′25″W | Rehoboth | |
| 3 | Anawan Rock | Anawan Rock | June 6, 1983 (#83000619) | Anawan St. 41°51′54″N 71°12′52″W | Rehoboth | |
| 4 | Angle Tree Stone | Angle Tree Stone | January 1, 1976 (#76000228) | West of North Attleborough off High St. 41°59′06″N 71°21′54″W | North Attleborough | Extends into Plainville in Norfolk County. |
| 5 | David M. Anthony House | David M. Anthony House | February 16, 1990 (#90000059) | 98 Bay Point Ave. 41°42′37″N 71°12′37″W | Swansea | |
| 6 | Apponegansett Meeting House | Apponegansett Meeting House | March 14, 1991 (#91000241) | Russells Mills Rd. east of Fresh River Valley Rd. 41°35′02″N 70°59′43″W | Dartmouth | |
| 7 | Assonet Historic District | Assonet Historic District | September 9, 1999 (#99001116) | Roughly bounded by MA 24, a private lane, Conrail railroad racks, and High St. 41°47′36″N 71°04′12″W | Freetown | |
| 8 | Attleboro Jewelry Industry Historic District | | April 17, 2025 (#100011758) | 12 Dunham Street; 37, 42, 46, 49, 50, 54 Union Street; 41°56′34″N 71°16′56″W | Attleboro | |
| 9 | Attleborough Falls Gasholder Building | Attleborough Falls Gasholder Building | August 1, 1996 (#96000848) | 380 Elm St. 41°58′28″N 71°19′11″W | North Attleborough | |
| 10 | Attleborough Falls Historic District | Attleborough Falls Historic District | January 6, 2004 (#03001372) | Mt. Hope St., just west of Reservoir St. to the Ten Mile River, Towne St. from Mt. Hope St. to the Ten Mile River; 41°35′02″N 70°59′43″W | North Attleborough | |
| 11 | Baker House | Baker House | June 6, 1983 (#83000622) | 191 Hornbine St. 41°47′32″N 71°12′01″W | Rehoboth | |
| 12 | Bark Street School | Bark Street School | February 16, 1990 (#90000062) | Stevens Rd. at Bark St. 41°44′58″N 71°09′50″W | Swansea | |
| 13 | Barneyville Historic District | Barneyville Historic District | February 16, 1990 (#90000052) | Old Providence and Barneyville Rds. 41°46′17″N 71°17′00″W | Swansea | |
| 14 | H.F. Barrows Manufacturing Company Building | H.F. Barrows Manufacturing Company Building | August 30, 2001 (#01000907) | 102 S. Washington St. 41°58′45″N 71°20′00″W | North Attleborough | |
| 15 | Bay Road | Bay Road | May 5, 1972 (#72000118) | 416-535 Bay Rd. (Foundry St. to the Norton town line); 42°00′36″N 71°07′17″W | Easton | |
| 16 | Bend of the Lane | Bend of the Lane | February 12, 1990 (#90000057) | 181 Cedar Ave. 41°44′28″N 71°13′12″W | Swansea | |
| 17 | Berkley Common Historic District | Berkley Common Historic District | January 19, 2016 (#15000980) | N. Main, S. Main, Porter & Locust Sts. 41°50′46″N 71°04′55″W | Berkley | |
| 18 | Blackinton Houses and Park | Blackinton Houses and Park | April 20, 1979 (#79000326) | N. Main St. 41°57′01″N 71°17′31″W | Attleboro | |
| 19 | Abiah Bliss House | Abiah Bliss House | June 6, 1983 (#83000625) | 154 Agricultural Ave. 41°53′23″N 71°16′25″W | Rehoboth | |
| 20 | Daniel Bliss Homestead | Daniel Bliss Homestead | June 6, 1983 (#83000626) | 76 Homestead Ave. 41°52′43″N 71°15′53″W | Rehoboth | |
| 21 | Borderland Historic District | Borderland Historic District | June 16, 1997 (#97000497) | Massapoag Avenue; 42°04′02″N 71°09′24″W | Easton | Coextensive with Borderland State Park, extending into Sharon in Norfolk County. |
| 22 | Nathan Bowen House | Nathan Bowen House | June 6, 1983 (#83000633) | 26 Kelton St. 41°49′50″N 71°13′47″W | Rehoboth | |
| 23 | Bramble Hill | Bramble Hill | June 6, 1983 (#83000634) | 32 Moulton St. 41°51′23″N 71°14′34″W | Rehoboth | |
| 24 | Brayton Homestead | Brayton Homestead | May 25, 2020 (#100005077) | 159 Brayton Ave. 41°43′30″N 71°09′38″W | Somerset | |
| 25 | Briggs Tavern | Briggs Tavern | June 6, 1983 (#83000636) | 2 Anawan St. 41°54′13″N 71°13′09″W | Rehoboth | |
| 26 | Brown House | Brown House | June 6, 1983 (#83000639) | 384 Tremont St. 41°54′07″N 71°15′48″W | Rehoboth | |
| 27 | John Brown IV House | John Brown IV House | February 16, 1990 (#90000064) | 703 Pearse Rd. 41°43′40″N 71°13′41″W | Swansea | |
| 28 | Deacon John Buffington House | Deacon John Buffington House | February 16, 1990 (#90000056) | 262 Cedar Ave. 41°44′25″N 71°13′05″W | Swansea | |
| 29 | Cadman–White–Handy House | Cadman–White–Handy House | July 16, 1992 (#92000831) | 202 Hixbridge Rd. 41°34′18″N 71°04′36″W | Westport | |
| 30 | Capron House | Capron House | July 21, 1978 (#78000426) | 42 North Ave. 41°57′19″N 71°17′50″W | Attleboro | |
| 31 | Carpenter Bridge | Carpenter Bridge | June 6, 1983 (#83000641) | Carpenter St. 41°51′18″N 71°15′22″W | Rehoboth | |
| 32 | Carpenter Homestead | Carpenter Homestead | September 17, 1993 (#93000902) | 80 Walnut St. 41°51′02″N 71°18′15″W | Seekonk | |
| 33 | Carpenter House | Carpenter House | June 6, 1983 (#83000642) | 89 Carpenter St. 41°51′17″N 71°15′17″W | Rehoboth | |
| 34 | Christopher Carpenter House | Christopher Carpenter House | June 6, 1983 (#83000643) | 60 Carpenter St. 41°51′21″N 71°15′06″W | Rehoboth | |
| 35 | Col. Thomas Carpenter III House | Col. Thomas Carpenter III House | June 6, 1983 (#83000644) | 77 Bay State Rd. 41°50′40″N 71°14′36″W | Rehoboth | |
| 36 | Church of Christ, Swansea | Church of Christ, Swansea | February 16, 1990 (#90000075) | G.A.R. Highway/U.S. Route 6 at Maple Ave. 41°45′03″N 71°13′31″W | Swansea | |
| 37 | Pitt Clarke House | Pitt Clarke House | July 13, 1976 (#76000230) | 42 Mansfield Ave. 41°58′13″N 71°11′40″W | Norton | |
| 38 | The Codding Farm | The Codding Farm | April 22, 2009 (#09000236) | 217 High St. 41°59′09″N 71°20′33″W | North Attleborough | |
| 39 | Benjamin Cole House | Benjamin Cole House | February 16, 1990 (#90000066) | 412 Old Warren Rd. 41°44′31″N 71°13′57″W | Swansea | |
| 40 | Colony Historic District | Colony Historic District | February 16, 1990 (#90000079) | Gardner's Neck and Mattapoisett Rds. at Mt. Hope Bay; 41°42′35″N 71°12′23″W | Swansea | |
| 41 | Commonwealth Avenue Historic District | Commonwealth Avenue Historic District | December 12, 2003 (#03001261) | Northern side of Commonwealth Ave. from Stanley St. to beyond Robinson St. 41°58′11″N 71°18′37″W | North Attleborough | |
| 42 | Coram Shipyard Historic District | Coram Shipyard Historic District | January 5, 1998 (#97000625) | 2120, 2125, and 2130 Water St. 41°48′46″N 71°07′02″W | Dighton | |
| 43 | Cottage–Freeman Historic District | Cottage–Freeman Historic District | December 12, 2003 (#03001263) | Cottage St. and Freeman St., from Commonwealth Ave. to the Ten Mile River and Park Ln. 41°58′03″N 71°18′38″W | North Attleborough | |
| 44 | Paul Cuffe Farm | Paul Cuffe Farm | May 30, 1974 (#74000394) | 1504 Drift Rd. 41°32′57″N 71°04′06″W | Westport | National Historic Landmark |
| 45 | Caleb Cushing House and Farm | Caleb Cushing House and Farm | June 6, 1983 (#83000660) | 186 Pine St. 41°51′05″N 71°17′16″W | Rehoboth | |
| 46 | Dighton Rock | Dighton Rock | July 2, 1971 (#80000438) | Across the Taunton River from Dighton in Dighton Rock State Park; 41°48′46″N 71°06′38″W | Berkley | |
| 47 | Dighton Wharves Historic District | Dighton Wharves Historic District | July 17, 1997 (#97000725) | 2298-2328 Pleasant St. 41°48′31″N 71°07′16″W | Dighton | |
| 48 | Dodgeville Mill | Dodgeville Mill | December 14, 2018 (#100003220) | 453 S Main St. 41°55′17″N 71°17′48″W | Attleboro | |
| 49 | Nathaniel Drown House | Nathaniel Drown House | June 6, 1983 (#83000663) | 116 Summer St. 41°50′29″N 71°15′32″W | Rehoboth | |
| 50 | East Attleborough Academy | East Attleborough Academy | April 4, 1985 (#85000694) | 28 Sanford St. 41°56′46″N 71°17′06″W | Attleboro | |
| 51 | East Freetown Historic District | East Freetown Historic District | September 9, 1999 (#99001115) | Roughly along Howland, Gurney, and Washburn County Rds. 41°46′22″N 70°57′55″W | Freetown | |
| 52 | Elm Cottage/Blanding Farm | Elm Cottage/Blanding Farm | June 6, 1983 (#83000666) | 103 Broad St. 41°50′16″N 71°17′29″W | Rehoboth | |
| 53 | Fairhaven High School and Academy | Fairhaven High School and Academy | January 22, 1981 (#81000121) | Huttleston Ave. 41°38′35″N 70°54′23″W | Fairhaven | |
| 54 | Fairhaven Town Hall | Fairhaven Town Hall | January 22, 1981 (#81000122) | Center St. 41°38′11″N 70°54′14″W | Fairhaven | |
| 55 | Fire Barn | Fire Barn | January 28, 1982 (#82004960) | Commonwealth Ave. 41°58′17″N 71°18′52″W | North Attleborough | |
| 56 | First Baptist Church and Society | First Baptist Church and Society | February 16, 1990 (#90000060) | Baptist St. 41°46′16″N 71°16′09″W | Swansea | |
| 57 | First Parsonage for Second East Parish Church | First Parsonage for Second East Parish Church | April 2, 1980 (#80000429) | 41 S. Main St. 41°56′36″N 71°17′07″W | Attleboro | Demolished. |
| 58 | Fisher–Richardson House | Fisher–Richardson House | February 11, 1998 (#98000096) | 354 Willow St. 42°00′37″N 71°13′42″W | Mansfield | |
| 59 | Fort Phoenix | Fort Phoenix | November 9, 1972 (#72000120) | South of U.S. Route 6 in Fort Phoenix Park; 41°37′26″N 70°54′11″W | Fairhaven | |
| 60 | Furnace Village Historic District | Furnace Village Historic District | October 6, 1983 (#83003938) | MA 106/123; 42°01′24″N 71°07′57″W | Easton | |
| 61 | Francis L. Gardner House | Francis L. Gardner House | February 16, 1990 (#90000077) | 1129 Gardner's Neck Rd. 41°43′15″N 71°12′09″W | Swansea | |
| 62 | Joseph Gardner House | Joseph Gardner House | February 16, 1990 (#90000076) | 1205 Gardner's Neck Rd. 41°43′07″N 71°12′15″W | Swansea | |
| 63 | Preserved Gardner House | Preserved Gardner House | February 16, 1990 (#90000061) | 90 Milford Rd. 41°45′03″N 71°11′58″W | Swansea | |
| 64 | Samuel Gardner House | Samuel Gardner House | February 16, 1990 (#90000068) | 1035 Gardner's Neck Rd. 41°43′22″N 71°12′08″W | Swansea | |
| 65 | Goff Farm | Goff Farm | June 6, 1983 (#83000672) | 157 Perryville Rd. 41°52′02″N 71°15′30″W | Rehoboth | Listed at 158 Perryville Rd. |
| 66 | Goff Homestead | Goff Homestead | June 6, 1983 (#83000673) | 40 Maple Lane; 41°50′50″N 71°13′27″W | Rehoboth | |
| 67 | H. H. Richardson Historic District of North Easton | H. H. Richardson Historic District of North Easton | December 23, 1987 (#87002598) | Main St., Elm St., and railway right-of-way off Oliver St. 42°04′12″N 71°06′02″W | Easton | Five buildings designed by H. H. Richardson; contained within the North Easton Historic District |
| 68 | Head of the River Historic District | Head of the River Historic District | December 2, 2009 (#09000965) | 2-28 Main St. 41°40′54″N 70°55′09″W | Acushnet | Extends into New Bedford. |
| 69 | Hebronville Mill Historic District | Hebronville Mill Historic District | May 17, 1984 (#84002126) | Knight Ave., Read St., and Phillip St. 41°54′18″N 71°19′12″W | Attleboro | |
| 70 | High, Church and Gould Streets Historic District | High, Church and Gould Streets Historic District | November 12, 1999 (#99001305) | 56-60-122 High St., 29-117 Church St., and 9-17 Gould St. 41°59′00″N 71°20′12″W | North Attleborough | |
| 71 | Hill School | Hill School | April 11, 1980 (#80000432) | 4 Middle St. 41°35′13″N 70°56′25″W | Dartmouth | |
| 72 | Hixville Village Historic District | Hixville Village Historic District | June 17, 1991 (#91000698) | Junction of Old Fall River, Hixville, and N. Hixville Rds. 41°40′56″N 71°01′56″W | Dartmouth | |
| 73 | Holmes School Historic District | | May 1, 2001 (#01000499) | Hoppin Hill Avenue at Holmes Road; 41°57′41″N 71°22′01″W | North Attleborough | |
| 74 | Hooper House | Hooper House | August 8, 1990 (#90000074) | 306 Hortonville Rd. 41°45′30″N 71°11′49″W | Swansea | |
| 75 | Hornbine Baptist Church | Hornbine Baptist Church | June 6, 1983 (#83000678) | 141 Hornbine Rd. 41°47′55″N 71°12′03″W | Rehoboth | |
| 76 | Hornbine School | Hornbine School | June 6, 1983 (#83000679) | 144 Hornbine Road; 41°47′53″N 71°12′07″W | Rehoboth | |
| 77 | Welcome Horton Farm | Welcome Horton Farm | June 6, 1983 (#83000680) | 122 Martin St. 41°47′58″N 71°14′14″W | Rehoboth | |
| 78 | Hortonville Historic District | Hortonville Historic District | February 16, 1990 (#90000051) | Locust St. from Oak St. to Hortonville Rd. 41°46′27″N 71°12′36″W | Swansea | |
| 79 | House at 197 Hornbine Road | House at 197 Hornbine Road | June 6, 1983 (#83000681) | 197 Hornbine Rd. 41°47′28″N 71°12′02″W | Rehoboth | |
| 80 | House at 30 Kelton Street | House at 30 Kelton Street | June 6, 1983 (#83000682) | 30 Kelton St. 41°49′50″N 71°13′51″W | Rehoboth | |
| 81 | Ingalls–Wheeler–Horton Homestead Site | Ingalls–Wheeler–Horton Homestead Site | June 6, 1983 (#83000684) | 214 Chestnut St. 41°49′02″N 71°14′49″W | Rehoboth | |
| 82 | J. V. Johnson House | J. V. Johnson House | August 8, 1990 (#90000069) | 36 Riverview Ave. 41°42′55″N 71°12′10″W | Swansea | |
| 83 | Kingsley House | Kingsley House | June 6, 1983 (#83000688) | 108 Davis St. 41°46′44″N 71°15′48″W | Rehoboth | Listed at 96 Davis Street. |
| 84 | Seth Knapp Jr. House | Seth Knapp Jr. House | June 6, 1983 (#83000689) | 82 Water St. 41°48′46″N 71°16′52″W | Rehoboth | |
| 85 | Long Plain Friends Meetinghouse | Long Plain Friends Meetinghouse | June 26, 1986 (#86001374) | 1341 N. Main St. 41°44′50″N 70°54′07″W | Acushnet | |
| 86 | Long Plain School | Long Plain School | July 17, 2012 (#12000413) | 1203 Main St. 41°44′15″N 70°53′47″W | Acushnet | now known as the Long Plain Museum |
| 87 | Lowney Chocolate Factory | Lowney Chocolate Factory | April 12, 2016 (#16000156) | 150 Oakland St. 42°02′22″N 71°12′52″W | Mansfield | |
| 88 | Luther House | Luther House | August 8, 1990 (#90000073) | 177 Market St. 41°45′52″N 71°16′09″W | Swansea | |
| 89 | Luther Store | Luther Store | May 22, 1978 (#78000438) | West of Swansea at 160 Old Warren Rd. 41°44′41″N 71°13′25″W | Swansea | |
| 90 | Luther's Corner | Luther's Corner | February 16, 1990 (#90000054) | Old Warren and Pierce Rds. 41°44′42″N 71°13′27″W | Swansea | |
| 91 | William Luther House | William Luther House | February 16, 1990 (#90000067) | 79 Old Warren Rd. 41°44′46″N 71°13′16″W | Swansea | Demolished c. 1991. |
| 92 | D. E. Makepeace Company | D. E. Makepeace Company | July 18, 1985 (#85001577) | 46 Pine St. 41°56′32″N 71°16′52″W | Attleboro | |
| 93 | Martin Farm | Martin Farm | June 6, 1983 (#83000691) | 121 Martin St. 41°47′52″N 71°14′14″W | Rehoboth | |
| 94 | Martin House | Martin House | May 2, 1974 (#74000365) | 940 County St. 41°48′50″N 71°17′54″W | Seekonk | |
| 95 | Martin House and Farm | Martin House and Farm | October 2, 1978 (#78000437) | 22 Stoney Hill Rd. 41°45′50″N 71°15′36″W | Swansea | |
| 96 | William P. Mason House | William P. Mason House | August 8, 1990 (#90000121) | 5 Mason St. 41°46′21″N 71°16′24″W | Swansea | |
| 97 | Millicent Library | Millicent Library | May 15, 1986 (#86001051) | 45 Center St. 41°38′41″N 70°54′15″W | Fairhaven | |
| 98 | North Attleborough Town Center Historic District | North Attleborough Town Center Historic District | December 20, 1985 (#85003168) | Roughly N. and S. Washington St. between Fisher and Bank Sts. 41°58′59″N 71°20′00″W | North Attleborough | |
| 99 | North Easton Historic District | North Easton Historic District | November 3, 1972 (#72000119) | Section of town north of and including both sides of Main-Lincoln St. 42°04′13″N 71°05′59″W | Easton | |
| 100 | North Easton Railroad Station | North Easton Railroad Station | April 11, 1972 (#72000125) | 80 Mechanic St. 42°04′11″N 71°06′14″W | Easton | |
| 101 | Northbound and Southbound Stations | Northbound and Southbound Stations | January 5, 1989 (#88003128) | 1 and 3 Mill St. 41°56′31″N 71°17′06″W | Attleboro | |
| 102 | Norton Center Historic District | Norton Center Historic District | December 23, 1977 (#77000170) | MA 123; 41°58′03″N 71°11′10″W | Norton | |
| 103 | Norton House | Norton House | February 16, 1990 (#90000078) | 61 Old Providence Rd. 41°46′21″N 71°16′27″W | Swansea | |
| 104 | Old Bay Road | Old Bay Road | November 8, 1974 (#74000362) | From Easton town line to Taunton town line 41°58′54″N 71°07′35″W | Norton | |
| 105 | Old Town Historic District | Old Town Historic District | May 30, 1991 (#91000599) | Near the junction of Old Post Road and Mt. Hope St. 41°56′40″N 71°20′24″W | North Attleborough | |
| 106 | Oxford School | | February 17, 2023 (#100008623) | 347 Main St. 41°39′25″N 70°54′30″W | Fairhaven | |
| 107 | Padanaram Village Historic District | Padanaram Village Historic District | September 5, 1985 (#85002010) | Elm, Water, Middle, High, Pleasant, Prospect, Hill, School, Fremont, and Bridge Sts. 41°35′08″N 70°56′30″W | Dartmouth | |
| 108 | Peck–Bowen House | Peck–Bowen House | June 6, 1983 (#83000700) | 330 Fairview Ave. 41°52′20″N 71°13′42″W | Rehoboth | |
| 109 | James Perry House | James Perry House | June 6, 1983 (#83000701) | 121 Perryville Rd. 41°51′41″N 71°15′26″W | Rehoboth | |
| 110 | Perry Hill Christian Church | | May 11, 2026 (#100012995) | 39 Perry Hill Road; 41°42′32″N 70°53′04″W | Acushnet | |
| 111 | Capt. Mial Pierce Farm | Capt. Mial Pierce Farm | June 6, 1983 (#83000703) | 177 Hornbine Rd. 41°47′41″N 71°11′56″W | Rehoboth | |
| 112 | Rehoboth Village Historic District | Rehoboth Village Historic District | June 6, 1983 (#83000707) | Bay State Rd. and Locust Ave. 41°50′26″N 71°15′09″W | Rehoboth | |
| 113 | Robinson Building | | October 30, 2023 (#100009506) | 37-41 Union St. 41°56′36″N 71°16′56″W | Attleboro | |
| 114 | Capt. Joel Robinson House | Capt. Joel Robinson House | November 20, 1978 (#78000428) | 111 Rocklawn Ave. 41°56′17″N 71°19′57″W | Attleboro | |
| 115 | Rogers Grammar School | | December 9, 2025 (#100012360) | 0 Chestnut Street and 100 Pleasant Street; 41°38′10″N 70°53′56″W | Fairhaven | |
| 116 | Russell Garrison | Russell Garrison | August 6, 2018 (#100002215) | Fort Street; 41°35′52″N 70°57′25″W | Dartmouth | |
| 117 | Russells Mills Village Historic District | Russells Mills Village Historic District | September 5, 1985 (#85002011) | Russells Mills, Rock O' Dundee, Slades Corner, Horseneck, and Fisher Rds. 41°34′23″N 71°00′18″W | Dartmouth | |
| 118 | Herbert A. Sadler House | Herbert A. Sadler House | October 21, 1982 (#82000489) | 574 Newport Ave. 41°55′20″N 71°21′16″W | Attleboro | |
| 119 | Ezekiel Sawin House | Ezekiel Sawin House | June 15, 1979 (#79000327) | 44 William St. 41°38′13″N 70°54′17″W | Fairhaven | |
| 120 | Short's Tavern | Short's Tavern | February 16, 1990 (#90000072) | 282 Market St. 41°45′42″N 71°16′09″W | Swansea | |
| 121 | Simcock House | Simcock House | February 16, 1990 (#90000063) | 1074 Sharps Lot Rd. 41°46′49″N 71°10′19″W | Swansea | |
| 122 | Smuggler's House | Smuggler's House | February 16, 1990 (#90000065) | 361 Pearse Rd. 41°44′05″N 71°13′26″W | Swansea | |
| 123 | Soldiers' Memorial Library | Soldiers' Memorial Library | June 2, 1995 (#95000681) | Junction of Park Row and Union St. 42°01′24″N 71°13′02″W | Mansfield | |
| 124 | Somerset Village Historic District | Somerset Village Historic District | March 13, 2020 (#100005075) | Avon St., Borland Ave., Cherry St., Church St., Clark St., Dublin St., High St., Main St., Maple St., Marsh St., Old Colony Ave., Palmer St., Peterson St., Pierce Ln., Pleasant St., School St., Simms Ave., and South St. 41°46′24″N 71°07′33″W | Somerset | |
| 125 | South Swansea Union Church | South Swansea Union Church | February 16, 1990 (#90000055) | Gardner's Neck Rd. 41°43′27″N 71°12′05″W | Swansea | |
| 126 | South Washington Street Historic District | South Washington Street Historic District | October 12, 1995 (#95001173) | 145-327 S. Washington St. and 1-6 Hunting St. 41°58′29″N 71°20′07″W | North Attleborough | |
| 127 | Spring Brook Cemetery | Spring Brook Cemetery | December 6, 2007 (#07001240) | Spring St; 42°01′07″N 71°13′20″W | Mansfield | |
| 128 | Swansea Friends Meeting House and Cemetery | Swansea Friends Meeting House and Cemetery | April 15, 2014 (#14000156) | 223 Prospect Street; 41°44′19″N 71°09′25″W | Somerset | |
| 129 | Swansea Village Historic District | Swansea Village Historic District | February 16, 1990 (#90000053) | Roughly Main St. from Gardners Neck Rd. to Stephens Rd., and Ledge Rd. 41°44′47″N 71°11′26″W | Swansea | |
| 130 | Towne Street Historic District | Towne Street Historic District | November 26, 2003 (#03001210) | Towne St. east of Jackson St. 41°58′21″N 71°18′44″W | North Attleborough | |
| 131 | Tucker Farm Historic District | Tucker Farm Historic District | August 25, 1988 (#88000705) | 1178 Tucker Rd. 41°37′46″N 70°58′55″W | Dartmouth | |
| 132 | Unitarian Memorial Church | Unitarian Memorial Church | November 22, 1996 (#96001374) | 102 Green St. 41°38′01″N 70°54′09″W | Fairhaven | |
| 133 | US Post Office–Attleboro Main | US Post Office–Attleboro Main | October 19, 1987 (#87001767) | 75 Park St. 41°56′38″N 71°16′54″W | Attleboro | 1916 building now used as office by county and city |
| 134 | Samuel Viall House | Samuel Viall House | June 6, 1983 (#83000728) | 85 Carpenter St. 41°51′17″N 71°15′15″W | Rehoboth | |
| 135 | Walkden Farm | Walkden Farm | February 16, 1990 (#90000071) | 495 Marvel St. 41°46′35″N 71°10′21″W | Swansea | |
| 136 | Watson, Newell & Company Factory | | November 5, 2020 (#100005761) | 67 Mechanic St. 41°56′38″N 71°17′33″W | Attleboro | |
| 137 | Westport Point Historic District | Westport Point Historic District | June 25, 1992 (#92000815) | Roughly Main St. from Charles St. to the West Branch of the Westport River, including Cape Bial and Valentine Lns. 41°31′24″N 71°04′29″W | Westport | |
| 138 | Aaron Wheeler House | Aaron Wheeler House | June 6, 1983 (#83000730) | 371 Fairview Ave. 41°52′28″N 71°13′24″W | Rehoboth | |
| 139 | Wheeler–Ingalls House | Wheeler–Ingalls House | July 5, 1983 (#83000731) | 51 Summer St. 41°50′04″N 71°14′51″W | Rehoboth | |
| 140 | Woodcock–Hatch–Maxcy House Historic District | Woodcock–Hatch–Maxcy House Historic District | July 12, 1990 (#90001081) | 362 N. Washington St. 41°59′34″N 71°19′50″W | North Attleborough | |

== Former listings ==
| | Name on the Register | Image | Date listed | Date removed | Location | City or town | Description |
|---|---|---|---|---|---|---|---|
| 1 | Harold H. Anthony House | Harold H. Anthony House | February 12, 1990 (#90000058) | October 26, 2026 | 132 Bay Point Ave. 41°42′39″N 71°12′43″W | Swansea | |

== See also ==
- List of National Historic Landmarks in Massachusetts
