= J. V. Johnson House =

Historic house in Massachusetts, United States

- U.S. National Register of Historic Places
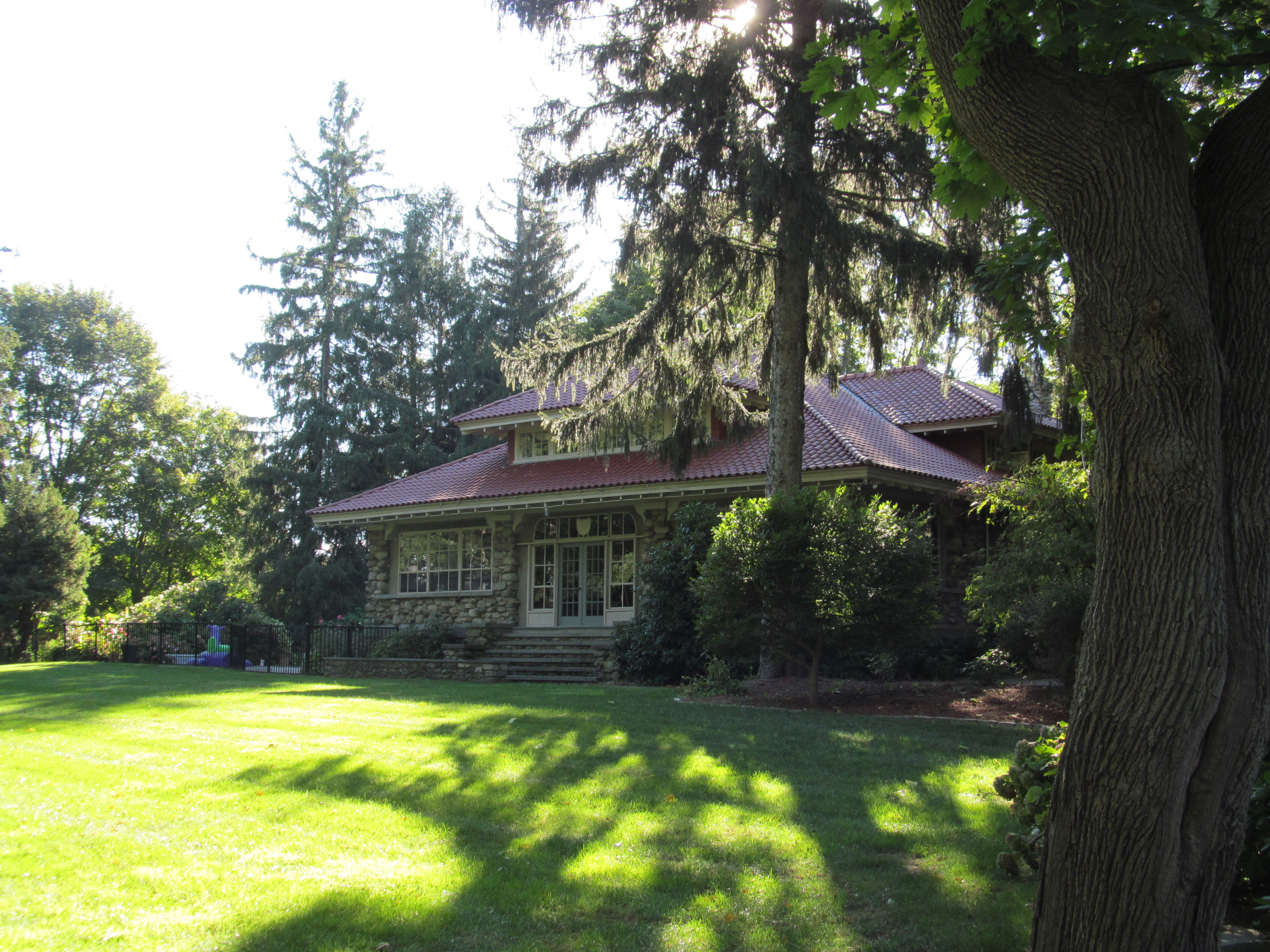
- J. V. Johnson House

- Location within Massachusetts Location within the United States
- Location: Swansea, Massachusetts
- Coordinates: 41°42′55″N 71°12′10″W
- Built: 1913
- Architect: Leeming, A.H. & Sons
- Architectural style: Prairie School
- MPS: Swansea MRA
- NRHP reference No.: 90000069
- Added to NRHP: August 8, 1990

The J. V. Johnson House is a historic house at 36 Riverview Avenue in Swansea, Massachusetts. This 1-1/2 Craftsman bungalow is locally distinctive for its use of stone as a building material and tile as a roofing material. It has the wide eaves and low-slung dormers characteristic of that style, as well as decorative terra cotta wall panels. Its designer is unknown; it was built in 1913 by Albert Leeming, a local contractor. Its first owner was a businessman who owned a local beverage maker, the Cliquot Club Soda Company.

The house was listed on the National Register of Historic Places in 1990.

== See also ==
- National Register of Historic Places listings in Bristol County, Massachusetts
