= Blackinton Houses and Park =

Historic houses in Massachusetts, United States

- U.S. National Register of Historic Places
- U.S. Historic district
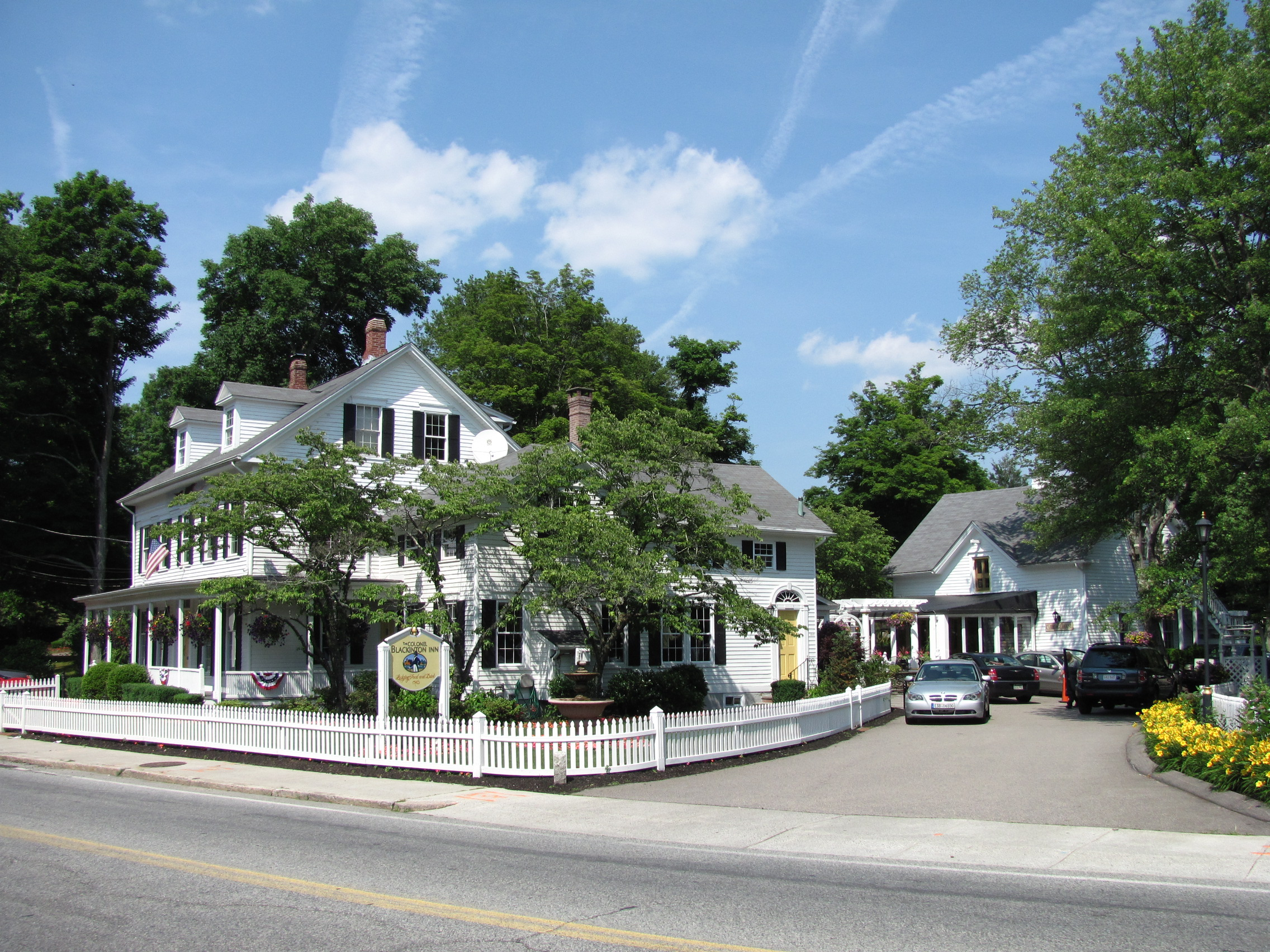
- Colonel Blackinton Inn

- Location within Massachusetts Location within the United States
- Location: Attleboro, Massachusetts
- Coordinates: 41°57′1″N 71°17′31″W
- Area: 5.5 acres (2.2 ha)
- Built: 1849
- Architect: Blackinton, Willard
- Architectural style: Greek Revival
- NRHP reference No.: 79000326
- Added to NRHP: April 20, 1979

The Blackinton Houses and Park is a historic district on North Main Street in Attleboro, Massachusetts, which encompasses a park and two adjacent houses, all of which were associated with the locally prominent Blackinton family in the area's 19th century history. The Willard Blackinton House, at 200 North Main, was built in 1849 by Willard Blackinton, who also built the duplex at 205-207 North Main for his two sons. The Blackintons operated a manufacturing shop which produced shuttles for power looms, and Willard Sr. was active in local politics. The park was established by a gift from Mayor Harold Sweet in 1937.

The district was listed on the National Register of Historic Places in 1979.

== See also ==
- National Register of Historic Places listings in Bristol County, Massachusetts
