= Colony Historic District =

Historic district in Massachusetts, United States

- U.S. National Register of Historic Places
- U.S. Historic district
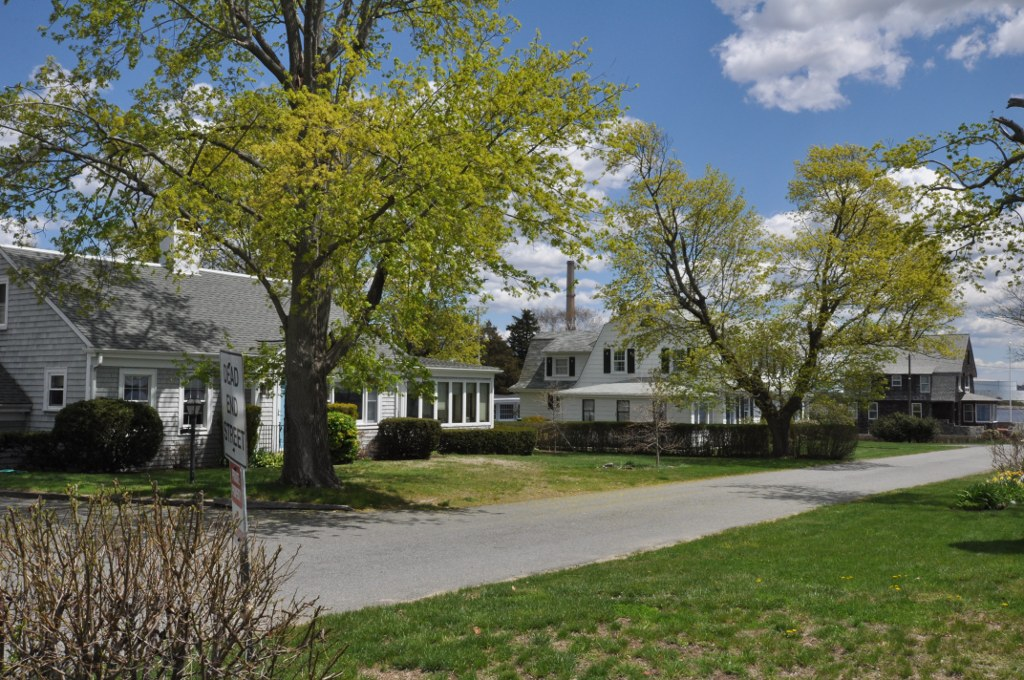
- Houses on Mattapoisett Avenue

- Location within Massachusetts Location within the United States
- Location: Swansea, Massachusetts
- Coordinates: 41°42′35″N 71°12′23″W
- Area: 4.31 acres (1.74 ha)
- Architect: Marvell, Edward I.
- Architectural style: Colonial Revival, Shingle Style
- MPS: Swansea MRA
- NRHP reference No.: 90000079
- Added to NRHP: February 16, 1990

The Colony Historic District is a historic district at Gardner's Neck and Mattapoisett Roads at Mt. Hope Bay in Swansea, Massachusetts. It includes seven summer cottages, most of which line Mattapoisett Road, which were built mainly between 1896 and 1930. Architecturally, these cottages are all in Shingle or Colonial Revival, and are representative of the summer resort development of Swansea around the turn of the 20th century.

The district was added to the National Register of Historic Places in 1990.

== See also ==
- National Register of Historic Places listings in Bristol County, Massachusetts
