= Swansea Village Historic District =

Historic district in Massachusetts, United States

- U.S. National Register of Historic Places
- U.S. Historic district
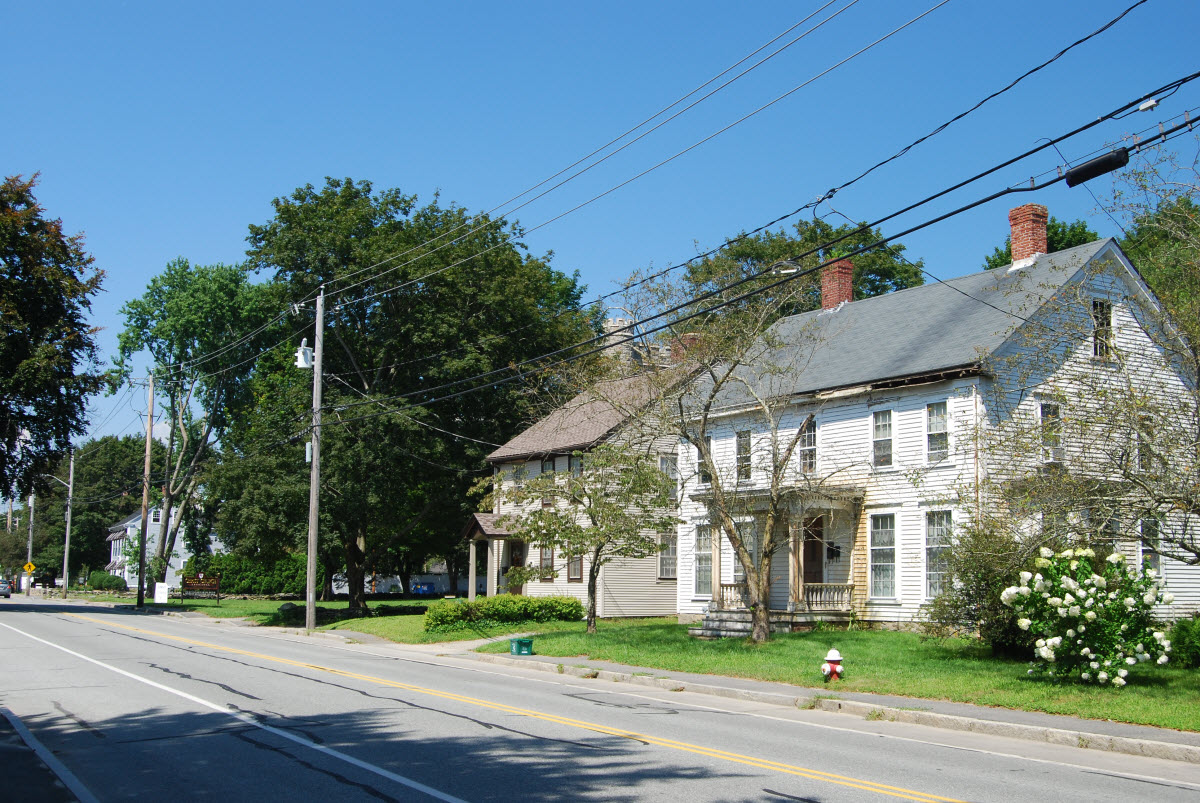
- Main Street

- Location within Massachusetts Location within the United States
- Location: Swansea, Massachusetts
- Coordinates: 41°44′47″N 71°11′26″W
- Area: 29 acres (12 ha)
- Architectural style: Italianate, Georgian, Federal
- MPS: Swansea MRA
- NRHP reference No.: 90000053
- Added to NRHP: February 16, 1990

Swansea Village Historic District is a historic district roughly along Main Street from Gardners Neck Road to Stephens Road, and Ledge Road in Swansea, Massachusetts. The district encompasses what emerged in the late 18th century as the principal municipal center of the town. The area that became Swansea Village was owned until about 1720 by members of the Eddy family, whose family graveyard lies in the district. By the early 19th century the junction of Main, Elm, and Stephens began to take shape as the nucleus of the village, and a meeting house, library, and eventually town hall followed.

The district was added to the National Register of Historic Places in 1990.

== See also ==
- National Register of Historic Places listings in Bristol County, Massachusetts
