= The Codding Farm =

- U.S. National Register of Historic Places
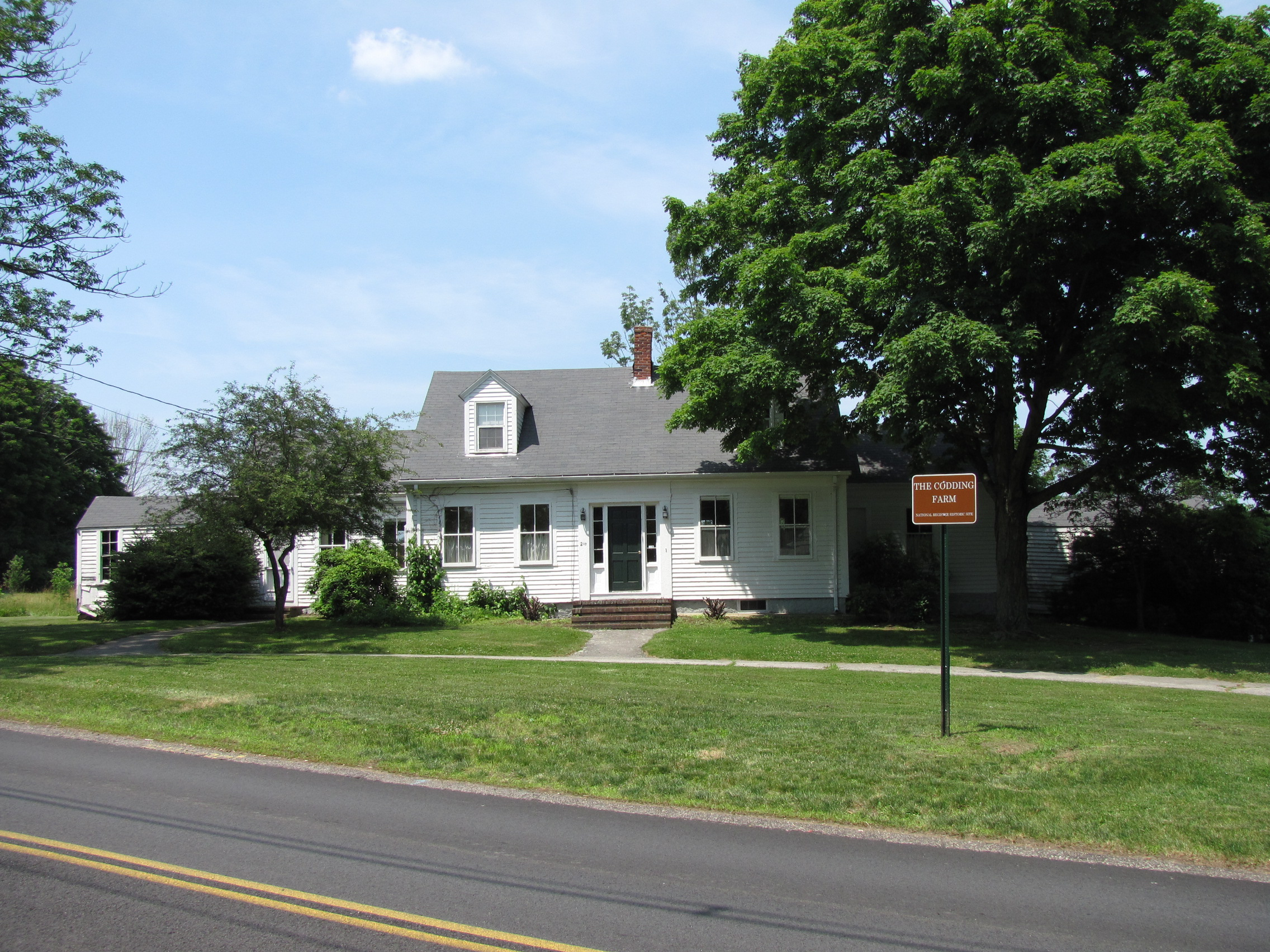

- Location within Massachusetts Location within the United States
- Location: 217 High St., North Attleborough, Massachusetts
- Coordinates: 41°59′7″N 71°20′33″W
- Area: 3.8 acres (1.5 ha)
- Built: 1850
- Architectural style: Federal, Greek Revival
- NRHP reference No.: 09000236
- Added to NRHP: April 22, 2009

The Codding Farm is a historic farmstead at 217 High Street in North Attleborough, Massachusetts. The farmstead consists of three buildings on just under 4 acres (1.6 ha) of land. The main house was built c. 1833, and its main block is a 1 1/2-story center-chimney Cape style structure. The side gable roof is pierced by two gable dormers, and the centered front entry is flanked by full-length sidelight windows and surrounded by wide, flat panels. There are single story ells built both left and right of the main house, whose front is set back from that of the main house and whose back wall is flush with that of the main house. One of these ells, both of which served in the 19th century as kitchens, may have been original, but there is evidence that the second is a later 19th century addition. The left addition has a further, smaller ell which was added in the 20th century, and the right wing has a utility shed addition that resembles the one on the left.

The outbuildings of the property are a c. 1940 garage/utility shed, and a c. 1918 barn. These two buildings lie just east of the main house. The shed is a wood-frame structure about 22 feet (6.7 m) square, with an asymmetrical gable roof to accommodate a pair of high openings on the south facade. The barn was built to serve the farm's dairying operations, and its design is sophisticated for the period of construction. It is built into a slope, allowing for ground-level access to the basement area, where manure is handled, as well as to the main level.

The farmstead was owned for 150 years by a single family. The farmstead was built by Jonathan Richards, probably not long after his marriage c. 1832–3. In 1850 the farm was purchased by Abiel Codding, Jr., a jeweler, probably for his father to work. During the Codding's ownership the house may have been converted for use by two families, as evidenced by the addition of the second kitchen ell. After Abiel Codding, Sr., died in 1881, his son leased the farm to tenant farmers. For much of the 20th century the tenants were members of the Titus family, even as the land changed hands among the generations of Coddings. In 2000 the town purchased the property in order to save it from planned development. Portions of the farm have been set aside for recreational purposes, and the buildings have been rehabilitated.

The property was listed on the National Register of Historic Places in 2009.

== See also ==
- National Register of Historic Places listings in Bristol County, Massachusetts
