= Tucker Farm Historic District =

Historic district in Massachusetts, United States

- U.S. National Register of Historic Places
- U.S. Historic district
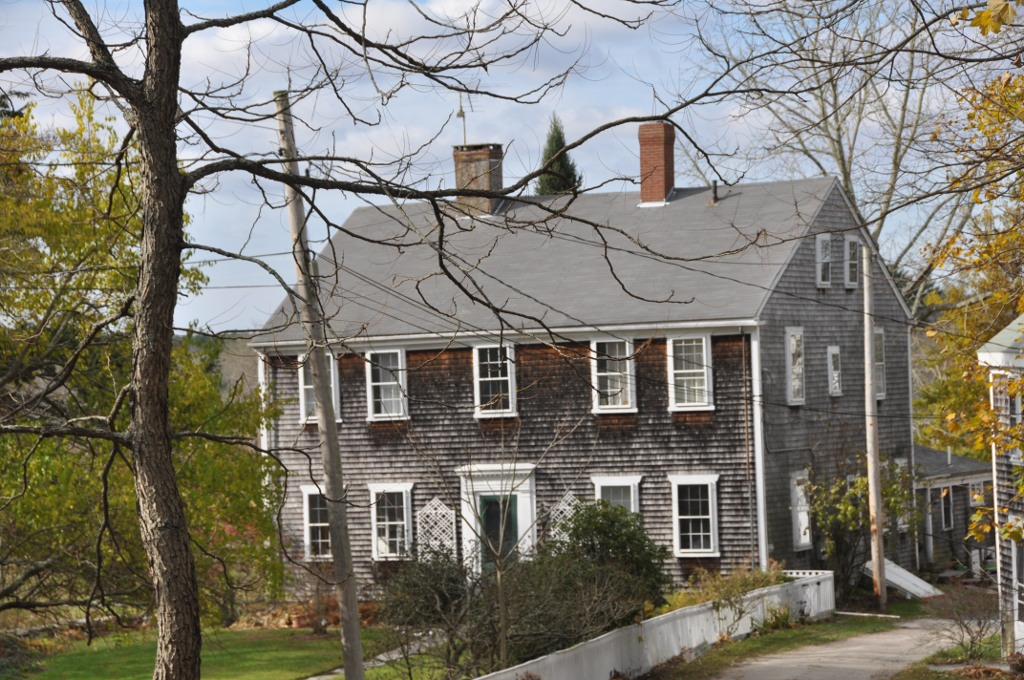

- Location within Massachusetts Location within the United States
- Location: 1178 Tucker Road, Dartmouth, Massachusetts
- Coordinates: 41°37′46″N 70°58′55″W
- Built: 1720
- Architectural style: Colonial, Georgian, Federal
- NRHP reference No.: 88000705
- Added to NRHP: August 25, 1988

The Tucker Farm Historic District is a historic district in Dartmouth, Massachusetts. It encompasses a farm property which has been worked since the 17th century, and several houses, one of which may have a portion dating to the ownership of Henry Tucker, the land's first English settler. It also includes a remnant of what was once a major Native trail and public right of way connecting Plymouth, Massachusetts, and Newport, Rhode Island.

The district was listed on the National Register of Historic Places in 1988.

== See also ==
- National Register of Historic Places listings in Bristol County, Massachusetts
