= Walkden Farm =

Historic house in Massachusetts, United States

- U.S. National Register of Historic Places
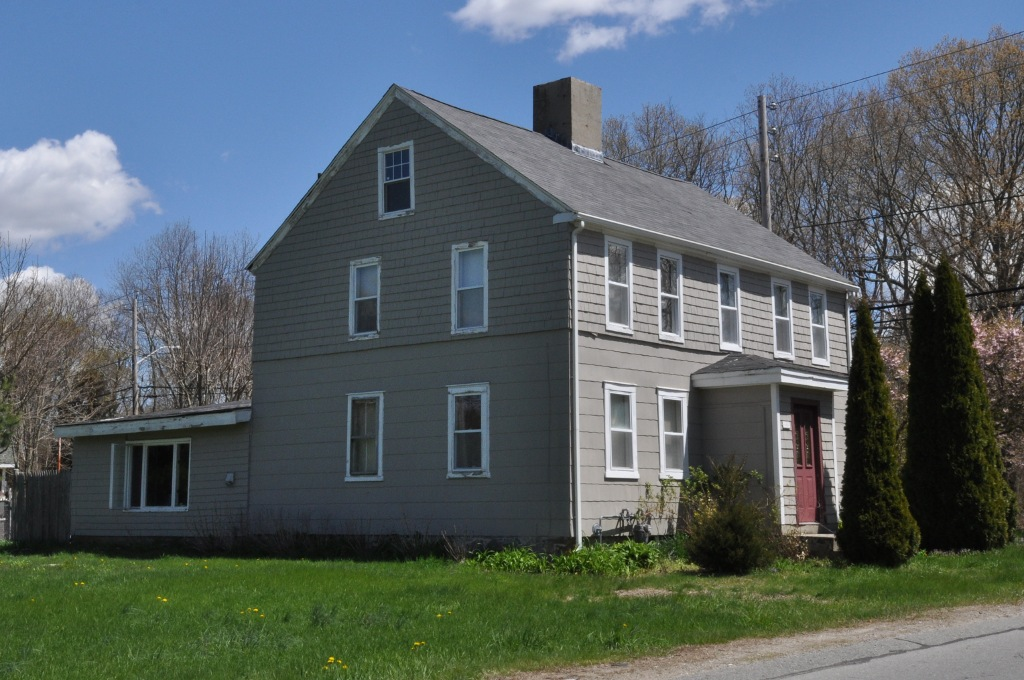

- Location within Massachusetts Location within the United States
- Location: 495 Marvel St., Swansea, Massachusetts
- Coordinates: 41°46′35″N 71°10′21″W
- Area: 2 acres (0.81 ha)
- Built: 1800
- Architectural style: Federal
- MPS: Swansea MRA
- NRHP reference No.: 90000071
- Added to NRHP: February 16, 1990

Walkden Farm is a historic farmhouse in Swansea, Massachusetts. The 2 1/2-story wood-frame house was built c. 1800, and is a well-preserved example of a vernacular Federal style farmhouse. It has the typical five-bay center-entry layout with a large central chimney, with corner pilasters and a frieze below the roofline. The entry is in a single-story hip-roofed projection, with full-length sidelights. The property includes a c. 1885 barn.

The house was listed on the National Register of Historic Places in 1990.

== See also ==
- National Register of Historic Places listings in Bristol County, Massachusetts
