= First Parsonage for Second East Parish Church =

- U.S. National Register of Historic Places
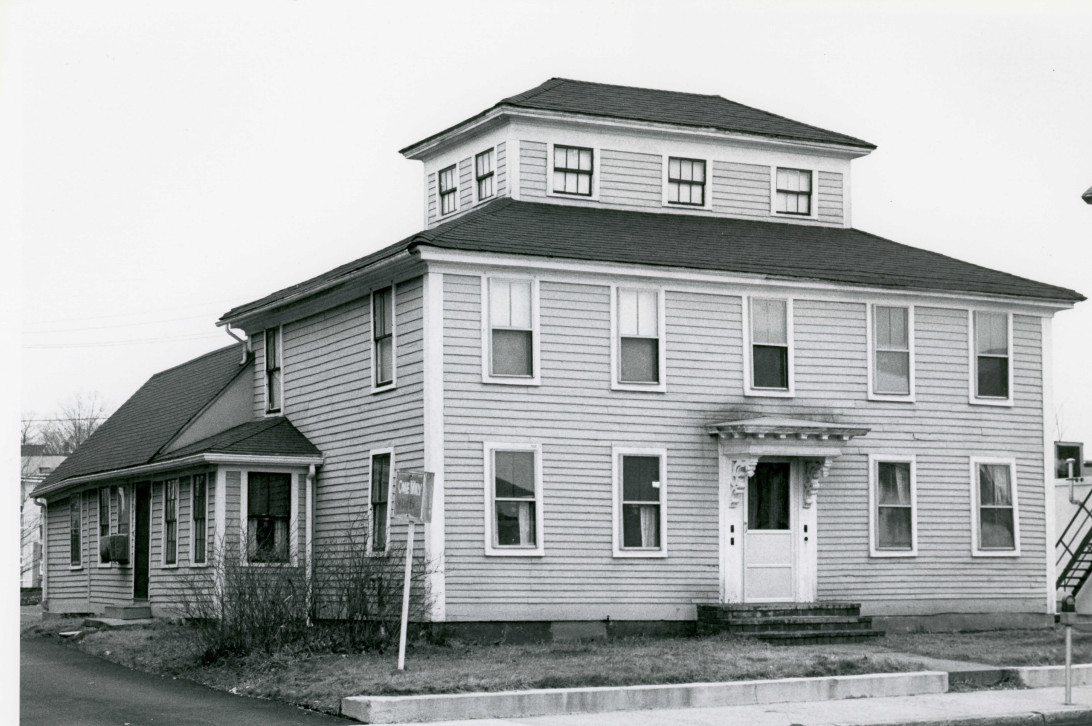
- Photo, 1977

- Location within Massachusetts Location within the United States
- Location: 41 S. Main St., Attleboro, Massachusetts
- Coordinates: 41°56′36″N 71°17′7″W
- Area: less than one acre
- Built: 1822
- Architectural style: Federal
- Demolished: 1998
- NRHP reference No.: 80000429
- Added to NRHP: April 2, 1980

The First Parsonage for Second East Parish Church was an historic church parsonage at 41 S. Main Street in Attleboro, Massachusetts. Built in 1822, it was a good local example of Federal period architecture. At the time of its listing on the National Register of Historic Places in 1980, it was the oldest documented building in the town center. It was demolished in 1998.

== Description and history ==
The First Parsonage of the Second East Parish Church was located in the central village of Attleboro, on the west side of South Main Street. Its location is approximately that of a parking lot between a row of commercial buildings and a senior living center. It was a 2-1/2 story wood frame structure, with a hip roof and clapboarded exterior. The hip roof included a feature rarely seen in period houses: a rectangular monitor at its center. Its main facade was five bays wide, with sash windows set in simple surrounds, and those on the upper level butting against the cornice moulding, also a Federal period feature. The main entrance was in the center of the facade, sheltered by a late 19th-century Italianate hood. A single-story ell extended to the rear of the main block.

The house was built in 1822 to serve as the parsonage for the town's east parish (the first parish now is in North Attleborough). It only served as home to the parish's third pastor, Rev. John Ferguson, from 1822 to 1835. It then passed through a succession of owners, the locally most notable being Joseph Capron. He was active in town affairs, serving as the town surveyor and in numerous other capacities. He was also president of a local mutual fire insurance company, and of the Attleboro Gaslight Company, an important utility that furthered the town's economic development. In its later years it had been subdivided into apartments. It was demolished in 1998.

== See also ==
- National Register of Historic Places listings in Bristol County, Massachusetts
