= Elm Cottage/Blanding Farm =

Historic house in Massachusetts, United States

- U.S. National Register of Historic Places
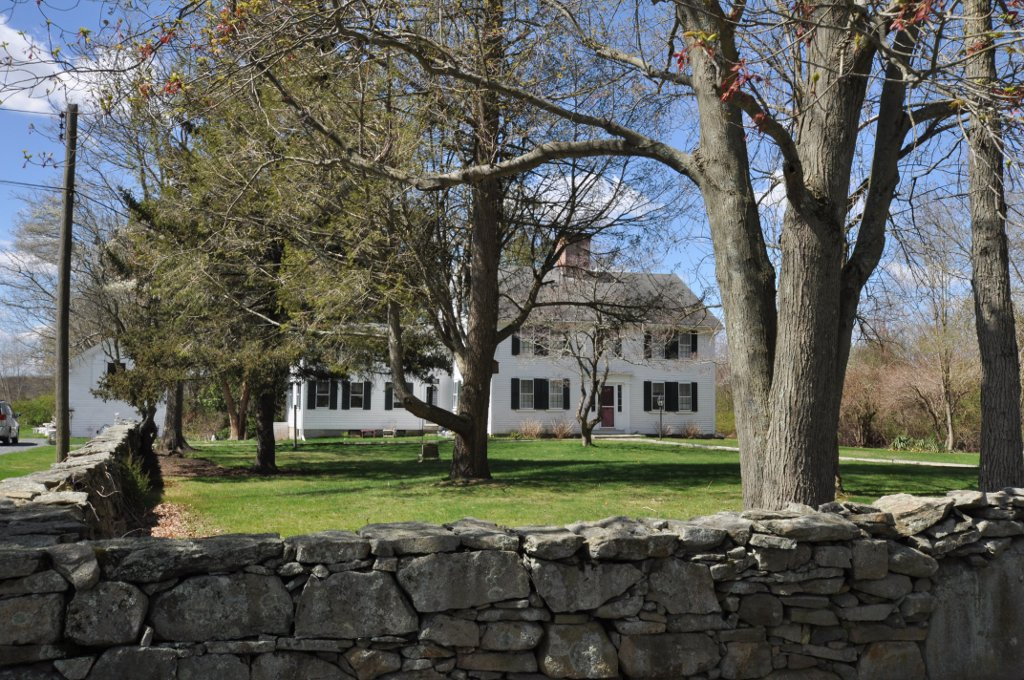

- Location within Massachusetts Location within the United States
- Location: Rehoboth, Massachusetts
- Coordinates: 41°50′16″N 71°17′29″W
- Built: 1800
- Architectural style: Federal
- MPS: Rehoboth MRA
- NRHP reference No.: 83000666
- Added to NRHP: June 6, 1983

Elm Cottage/Blanding Farm is a historic house at 103 Broad Street in Rehoboth, Massachusetts. The main block of this 2 1/2-story farmhouse was built c. 1800; its rear kitchen ell was added c. 1840. The house was the site of a long-successful local farming operation owned by the Blanding family. One of its early residents was Dr. William Blanding, a physician who also wrote a significant early work on the older houses of Rehoboth.

The house was listed on the National Register of Historic Places in 1983.

== See also ==
- National Register of Historic Places listings in Bristol County, Massachusetts
