= Welcome Horton Farm =

- U.S. National Register of Historic Places
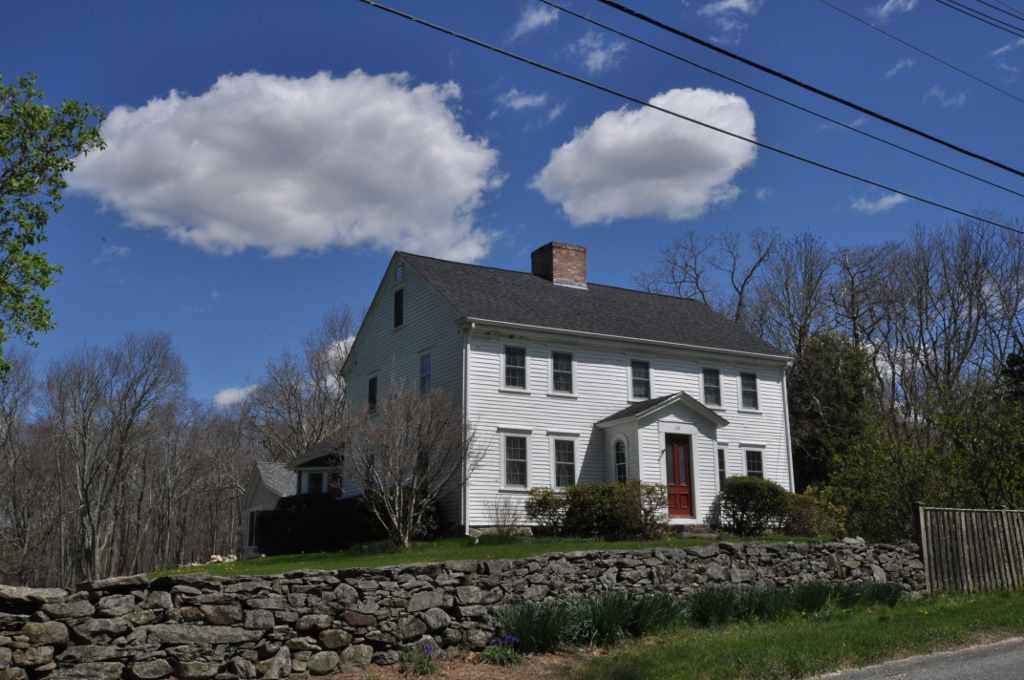

- Location within Massachusetts Location within the United States
- Location: Rehoboth, Massachusetts
- Coordinates: 41°47′58″N 71°14′14″W
- Built: 1750
- Architectural style: Georgian, Federal
- MPS: Rehoboth MRA
- NRHP reference No.: 83000680
- Added to NRHP: June 6, 1983

The Welcome Horton Farm is a historic farmhouse at 122 Martin Street in Rehoboth, Massachusetts, USA. The 2 1/2-story wood-frame house was built c. 1750–70, and is a well-preserved Georgian style house. Its enclosed front entry is possibly an original feature, and there is fine period woodwork inside. Some of the walls, covered by more recent paneling, may have been stencilled. The house was for many years in the Martin family (for whom the street is named), coming into the hands of Welcome Horton in 1895.

The farmhouse was listed on the National Register of Historic Places in 1983.

== See also ==
- National Register of Historic Places listings in Bristol County, Massachusetts
