= Bend of the Lane =

Historic house in Massachusetts, United States

- U.S. National Register of Historic Places
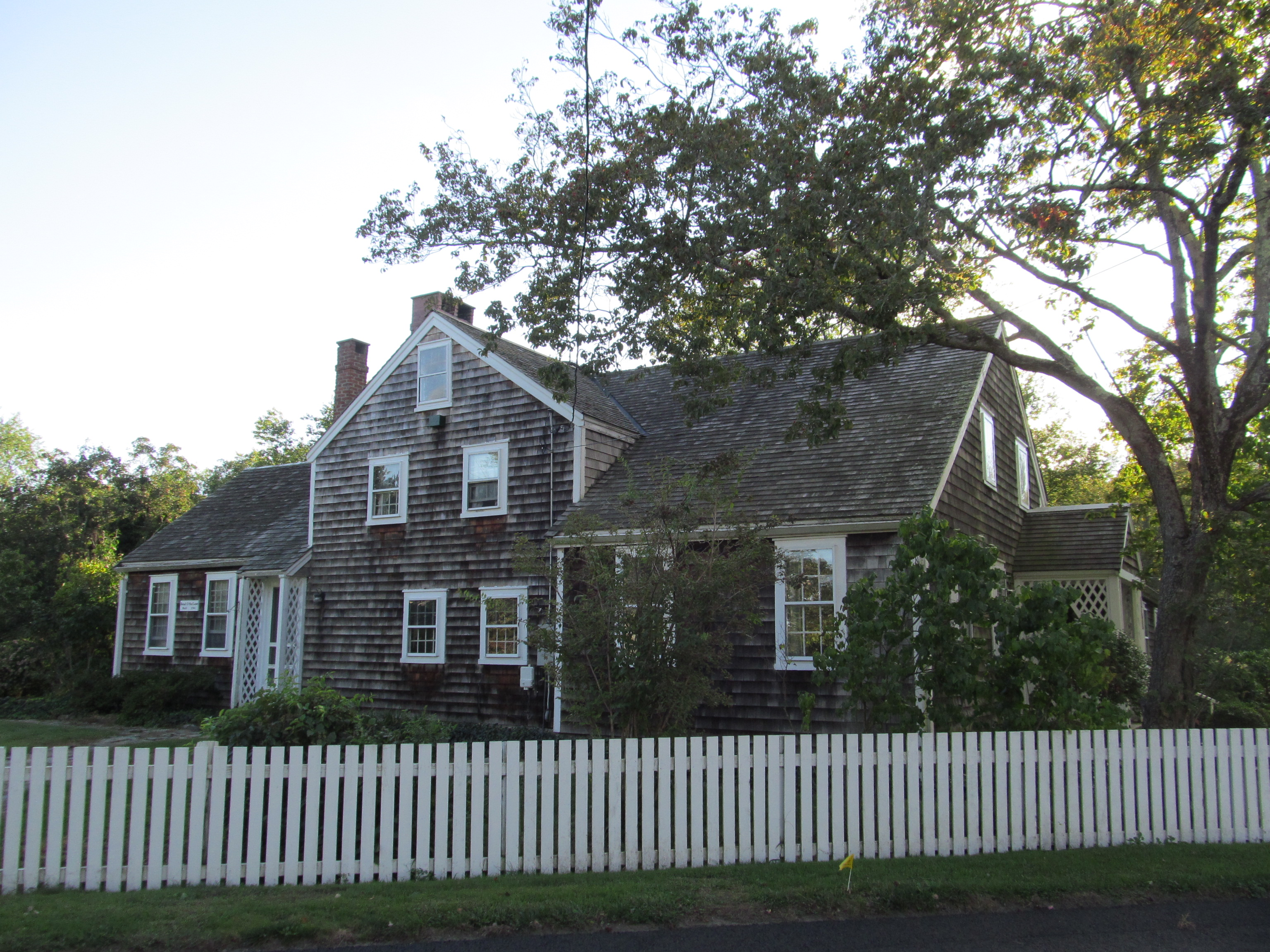
- Bend of the Lane

- Location within Massachusetts Location within the United States
- Location: 181 Cedar Avenue, Swansea, Massachusetts
- Coordinates: 41°44′28″N 71°13′12″W
- Area: 4 acres (1.6 ha)
- Built: 1740
- Architectural style: Georgian
- MPS: Swansea MRA
- NRHP reference No.: 90000057
- Added to NRHP: February 12, 1990

Bend of the Lane, also known as the Harlow Luther House, is a historic house in Swansea, Massachusetts. The main block of this 2 1/2-story wood-frame house was built c. 1740, and is a well-preserved local example of vernacular Georgian styling. A 1 1/2-story ell was added c. 1850, and a second ell, an old "half-house" (three-bay facade), was grafted onto the front c. 1930. The house has been associated for many years with prominent local farmers, including its builder, Harlow Luther, and Victor Gardner, whose family settled Gardner's Neck.

The house was listed on the National Register of Historic Places in 1990.

== See also ==
- National Register of Historic Places listings in Bristol County, Massachusetts
