= Capron House (Attleboro, Massachusetts) =

Historic house in Massachusetts, United States

- U.S. National Register of Historic Places
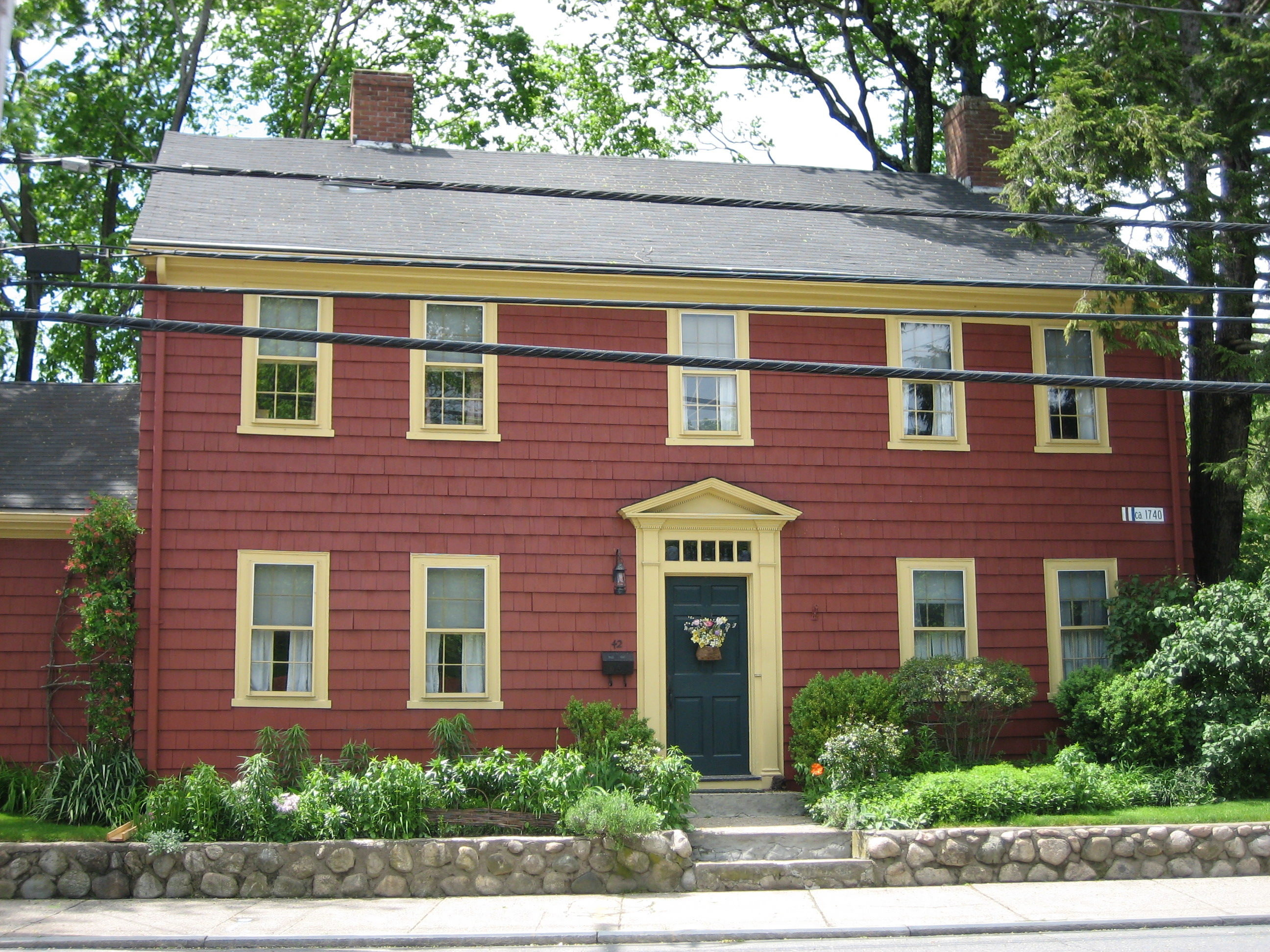

- Location within Massachusetts Location within the United States
- Location: Attleboro, Massachusetts
- Coordinates: 41°57′19″N 71°17′50″W
- Area: less than one acre
- NRHP reference No.: 78000426
- Added to NRHP: July 21, 1978

The Capron House is an historic house on 42 North Avenue in Attleboro, Massachusetts. It is one of the town's oldest surviving buildings, built about 1740 by the son of one of its first settlers. The house was added to the National Register of Historic Places in 1978.

== Description and history ==
The Capron House stands in what is now a mixed residential-commercial area north of downtown Attleboro, on the west side of North Avenue north of its junction with Deanville Road. It is now set close to the road; it originally had a larger front lawn, much of which was taken in the late 19th century when a streetcar line was laid. It is a 2 1/2-story wood-frame structure, with a side-gable roof, two asymmetrically placed interior chimneys, and an exterior of wooden shingles laid over original wooden clapboards. It is five bays wide and two deep, with single story ells extending its left side. Its main entry is flanked by pilasters and topped by a four-light transom window and a full pedimented gable. Interior features include original wide pine flooring and horizontal wainscoting.

One of the early settlers of the area that is now Attleboro was Banfield Capron, whose family would continue to be prominent in town affairs for many years. He gave each of his seven children 200 acres (81 ha) of farmland. This house was built about 1740 by one of those children. The property is now much reduced in size, only 1/3 acre. One of the house's 19th-century residents, Joseph Capron, kept a detailed journal about events and conditions of the property.

== See also ==
- National Register of Historic Places listings in Bristol County, Massachusetts
