= Ezekiel Sawin House =

Historic house in Massachusetts, United States

- U.S. National Register of Historic Places
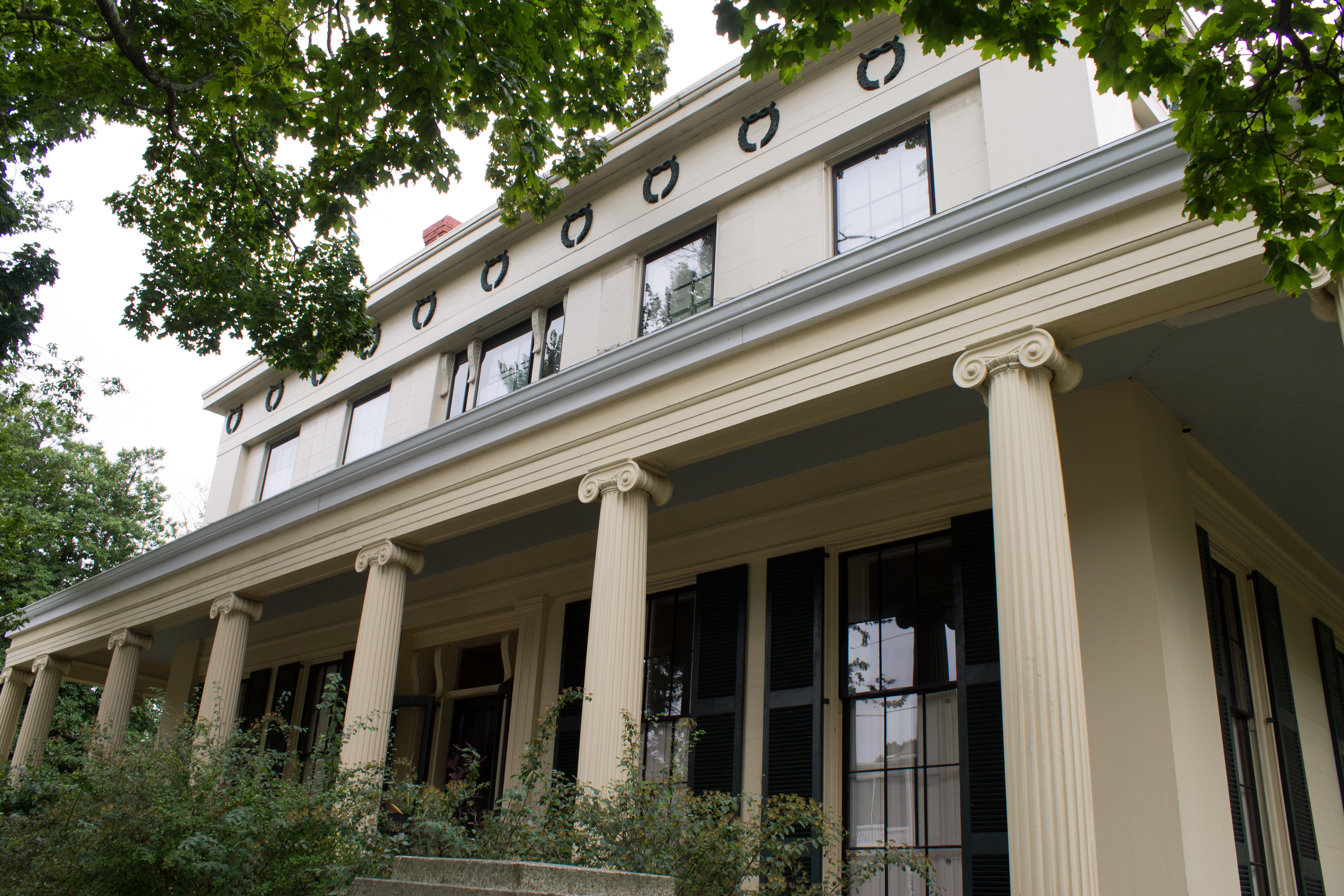

- Location within Massachusetts Location within the United States
- Location: 44 William St., Fairhaven, Massachusetts
- Coordinates: 41°38′13″N 70°54′17″W
- Built: 1840–1844
- Architectural style: Greek Revival
- NRHP reference No.: 79000327
- Added to NRHP: June 15, 1979

The Ezekiel Sawin House is a historic house located in Fairhaven, Massachusetts.

== Description and history ==
The two-story, wood-framed house was built between 1840 and 1844 by Ezekiel Sawin, president of the Fairhaven Bank. It is an elaborate and distinctive expression of Greek Revival styling, with a wraparound porch supported by Ionic columns, and wide corner pilasters. The house also has some Federal elements including a balustrade at the edge of the roof.

The house was listed on the National Register of Historic Places on June 15, 1979.

== See also ==
- National Register of Historic Places listings in Bristol County, Massachusetts
