= Watson, Newell & Company Factory =

- U.S. National Register of Historic Places
- Location within Massachusetts Location within the United States
- Location: 67 Mechanic St., Attleboro, Massachusetts
- Coordinates: 41°56′38″N 71°17′33″W
- Area: 8.3 acres (3.4 ha)
- Built: 1889
- NRHP reference No.: 100005761
- Added to NRHP: November 5, 2020

The Watson, Newell & Company Factory is a historic industrial complex at 67 Mechanic Street in Attleboro, Massachusetts. Built between 1889 and 1947, it is located on the site of the city's first textile mill, and was home to a prominent jewelry manufacturer for many years. It was listed on the National Register of Historic Places in 2020.

== Description and history ==
The former Watson, Newell complex is located west of downtown Attleboro, in a largely residential area. It is set on more than 8 acres (3.2 ha), bounded on the south by Mechanic Street, and the north by the Ten Mile River. The river is partially diverted through the property, providing water power for the early textile mills set on the site. The main structures of the mill are three and four stories in height, built with brick exteriors and heavy timber framing on the interior. The main buildings are long and comparatively narrow, a form dictated by the manufacturing requirements of machine-made jewelry.

This site's industrial use began in 1811, when a textile manufacturer dammed the river. The textile complex was heavily damaged by fire c. 1885, and although partially rebuilt, was never used again for that purpose. The Watson & Newell Company, founded in 1874 as Cobb, Gould, purchased the property in 1889, and commissioned the construction of the present complex's Building One. The company manufactured a variety of silver products, including buttons, pins, flatware, and souvenir spoons, employing more than 200 people at the site. The company remained in business on this site until 1955, when it was sold and its operations relocated to Wallingford, Connecticut. The complex presently houses a variety of small manufacturing operations.

== See also ==
- National Register of Historic Places listings in Bristol County, Massachusetts
