= Woodcock–Hatch–Maxcy House Historic District =

Historic house in Massachusetts, United States

- U.S. National Register of Historic Places
- U.S. Historic district
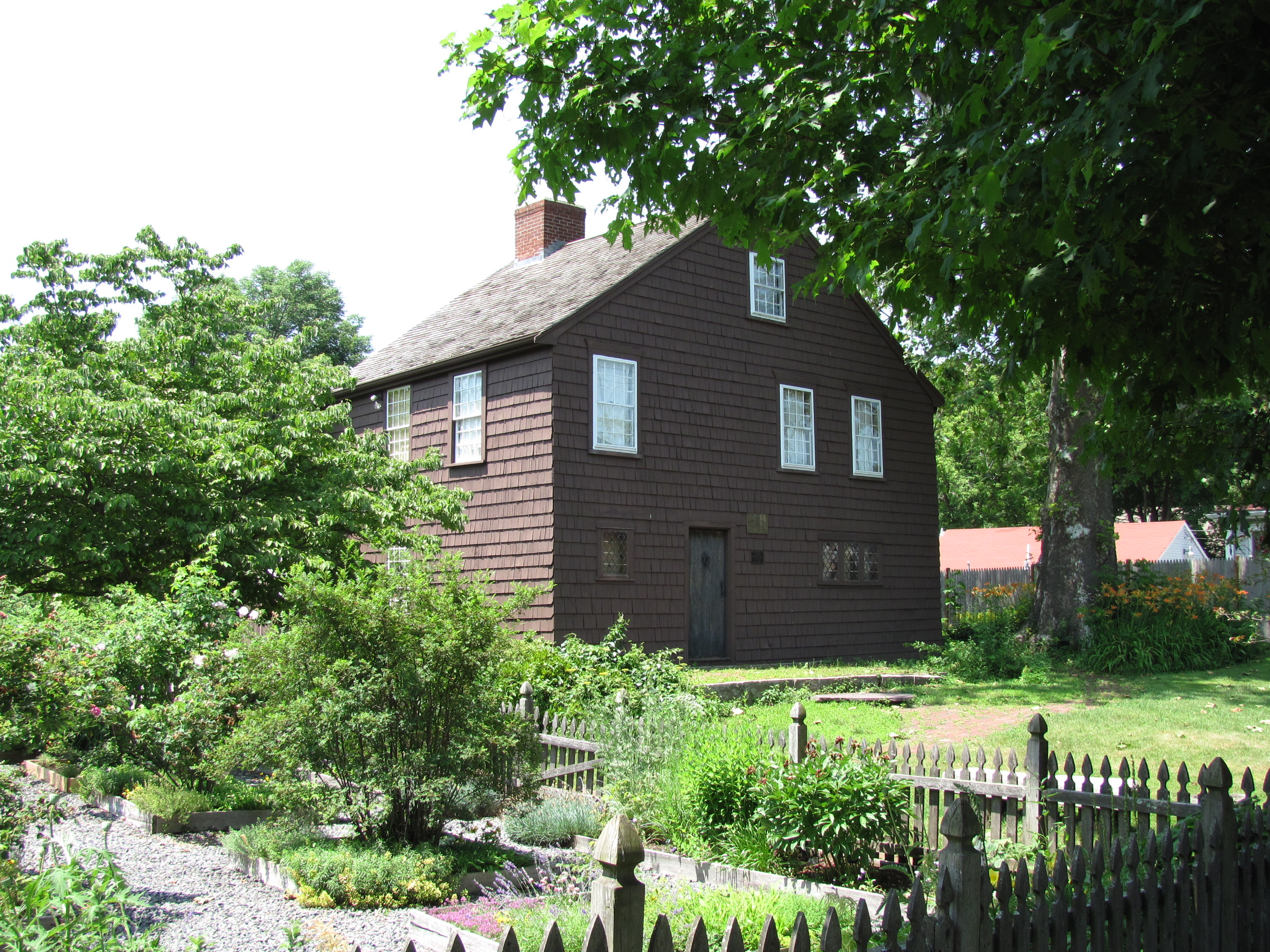
- Woodcock–Hatch–Maxcy House

- Location within Massachusetts Location within the United States
- Location: 362 North Washington Street, North Attleborough, Massachusetts
- Coordinates: 41°59′34″N 71°19′50″W
- Architect: John Dagget
- Architectural style: Colonial
- NRHP reference No.: 90001081
- Added to NRHP: July 12, 1990

The Woodcock–Hatch–Maxcy House Historic District, also known as the Woodcock Garrison House, is located in North Attleborough, Massachusetts. Now a museum operated by the North Attleborough Historic Society, the oldest portion of this 2 1/2-story wood-frame house was thought to have been built c. 1670 by John Woodcock, but his house was demolished in 1806, and this house was probably built between 1711 and 1722 by John Daggett. It was operated as a tavern by Daggett, John Maxcy (1722-1789), and Israel Hatch and his descendants (until the late 19th century).

The property was listed on the National Register of Historic Places in 1990.

== See also ==
- National Register of Historic Places listings in Bristol County, Massachusetts
