= Short's Tavern =

- U.S. National Register of Historic Places
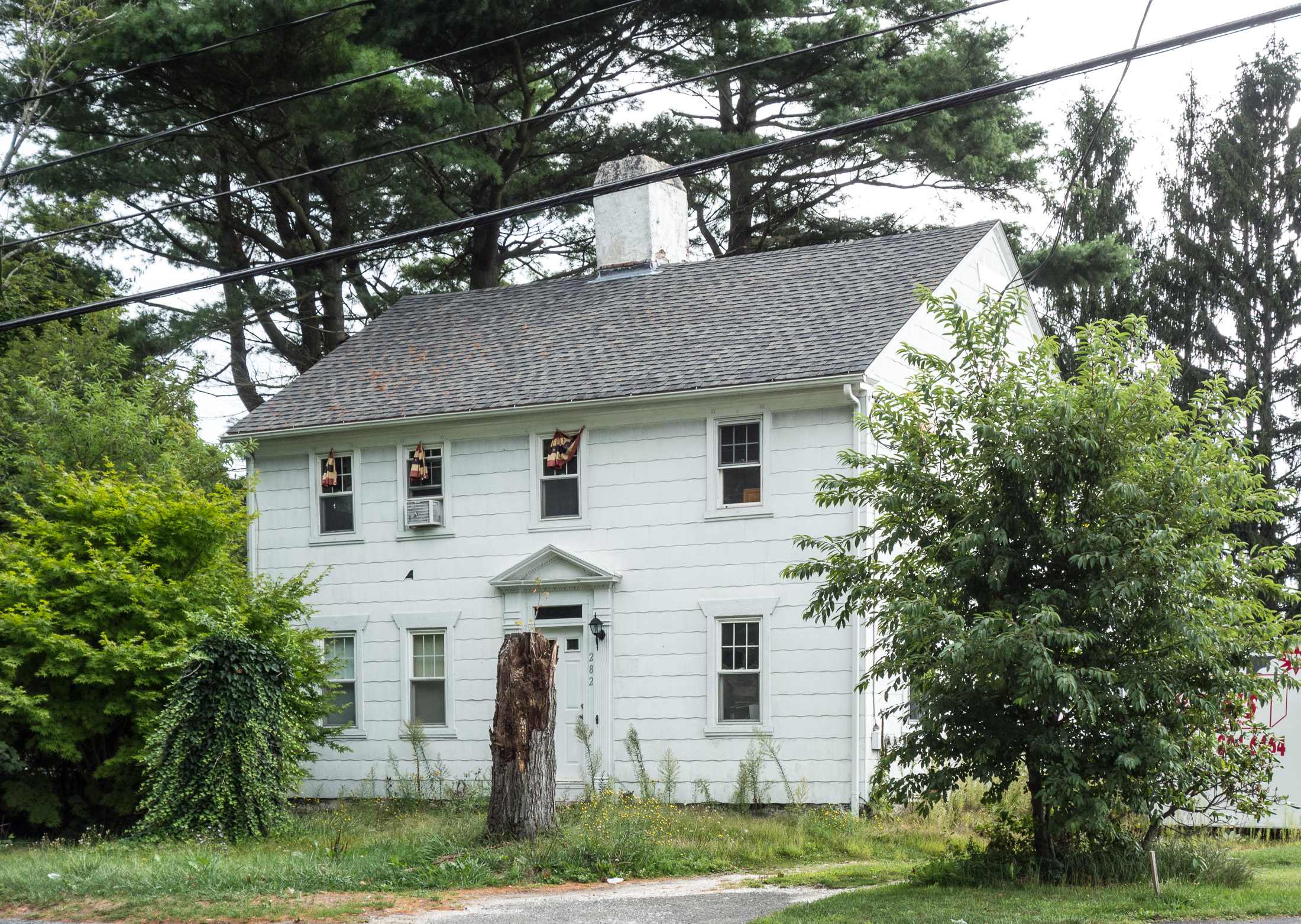
- Short's Tavern in 2013

- Location within Massachusetts Location within the United States
- Location: 282 Market Street, Swansea, Massachusetts
- Coordinates: 41°45′42″N 71°16′9″W
- Area: less than one acre
- Built: 1742
- Architectural style: Georgian
- MPS: Swansea MRA
- NRHP reference No.: 90000072
- Added to NRHP: February 16, 1990

Short's Tavern is a historic building in Swansea, Massachusetts. In form it is a three-quarter Georgian house, 2 1/2 stories in height and four bays across, with a side gable roof and a central chimney. The main entrance is flanked by pilasters and topped by a transom window and gabled pediment. The house was built c. 1742 as a farm house, and was acquired 1851 by James Short, who operated a tavern on the premises, capitalizing on its location along what was then a major county road.

The building was listed on the National Register of Historic Places in 1990.

== See also ==
- National Register of Historic Places listings in Bristol County, Massachusetts
