= Nathaniel Drown House =

Historic house in Massachusetts, United States

- U.S. National Register of Historic Places
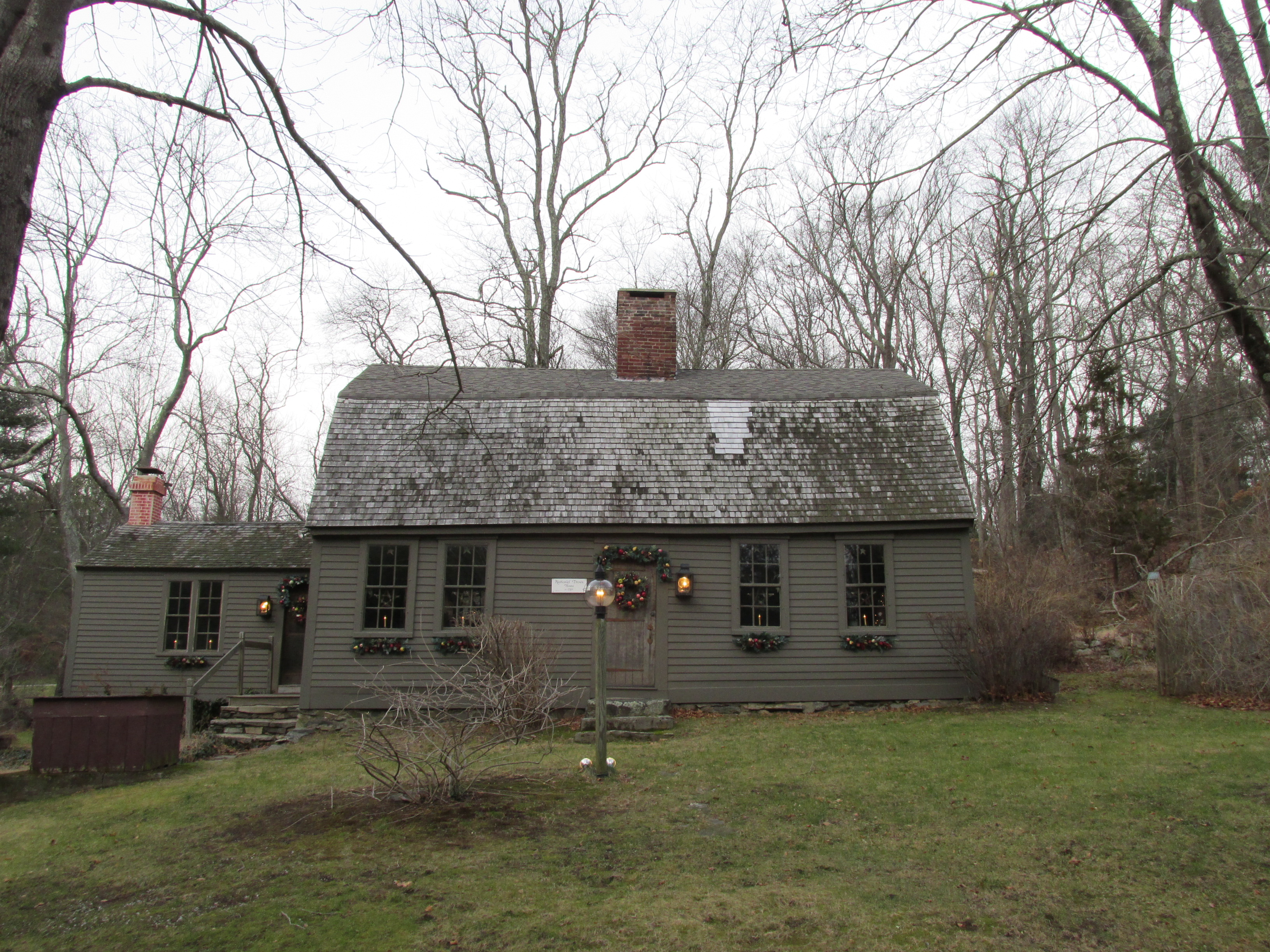
- Nathaniel Drown House

- Location within Massachusetts Location within the United States
- Location: 116 Summer St., Rehoboth, Massachusetts
- Coordinates: 41°50′29″N 71°15′32″W
- Built: c. 1750
- Architectural style: Federal
- MPS: Rehoboth MRA
- NRHP reference No.: 83000663
- Added to NRHP: June 6, 1983

The Nathaniel Drown House is a historic house located in Rehoboth, Massachusetts.

== Description and history ==
Built in about 1750, this two-story, wood-framed house is one of the best-preserved local examples of the once-common gambrel roof Georgian house. Its builder is unknown; its first documented owner was Nathaniel Drown, who owned it during the American Revolutionary War. The interior retains its original wood paneling, fireplaces, and flooring. The property also includes a c. 1840 barn and a mid-19th century carriage barn.

The house was listed on the National Register of Historic Places on June 6, 1983.

== See also ==
- National Register of Historic Places listings in Bristol County, Massachusetts
