= Samuel Viall House =

Historic house in Massachusetts, United States

- U.S. National Register of Historic Places
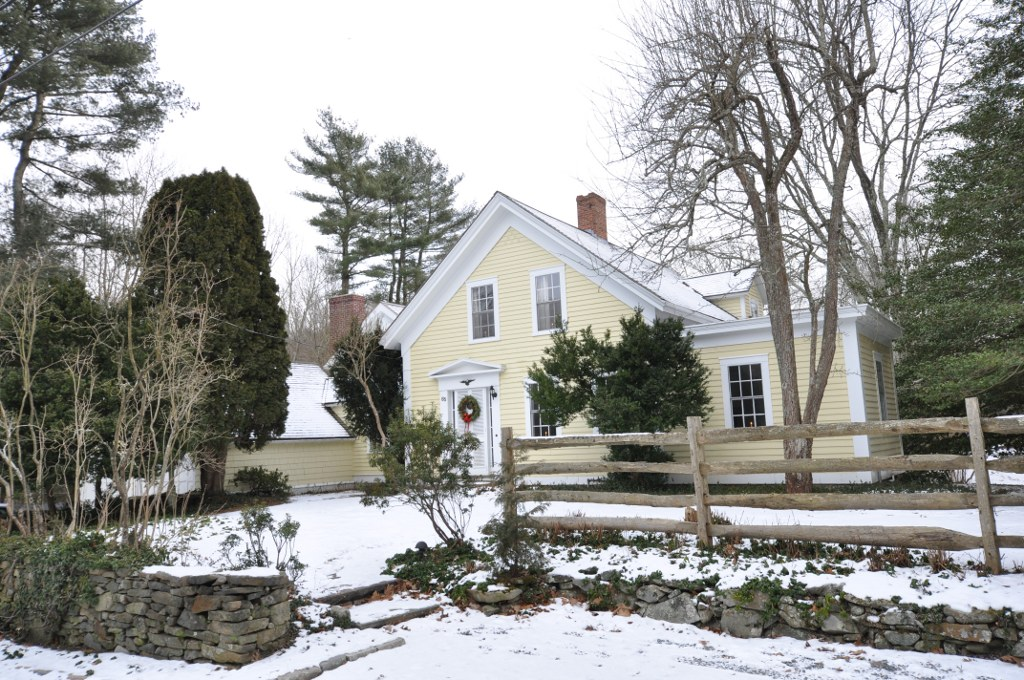

- Location within Massachusetts Location within the United States
- Location: Rehoboth, Massachusetts
- Coordinates: 41°51′17″N 71°15′15″W
- Built: 1800
- Architectural style: Greek Revival
- MPS: Rehoboth MRA
- NRHP reference No.: 83000728
- Added to NRHP: June 6, 1983

The Samuel Viall House is a historic house at 85 Carpenter Street in Rehoboth, Massachusetts. This 1 1/2-story wood-frame house has an unusual construction history: it was originally built c. 1800 as an outbuilding, probably by either Peter or Thomas Carpenter. It was acquired in 1850 by Samuel Viall, who made extensive alterations, transforming it into a Greek Revival side-hall house, a type which is rare in Rehoboth. The additions on the east side of the house date to the 20th century.

The house was listed on the National Register of Historic Places in 1983.

== See also ==
- National Register of Historic Places listings in Bristol County, Massachusetts
