= Bramble Hill =

Historic house in Massachusetts, United States

- U.S. National Register of Historic Places
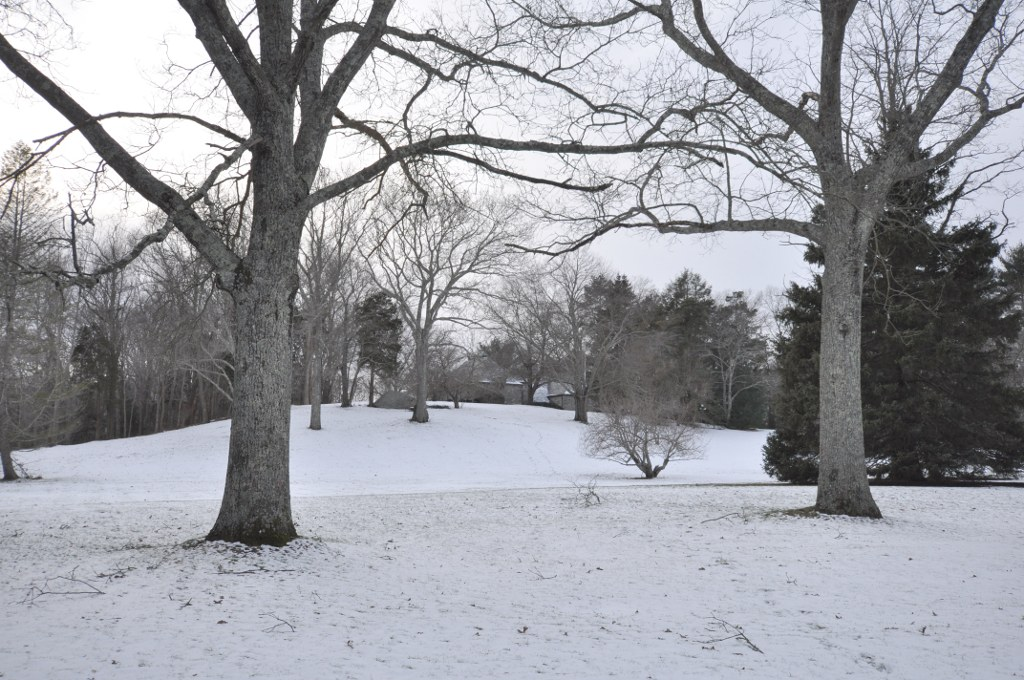

- Location within Massachusetts Location within the United States
- Location: 32 Moulton Street, Rehoboth, Massachusetts
- Coordinates: 41°51′23″N 71°14′34″W
- Area: 9.7 acres (3.9 ha)
- Built: 1923
- Architect: Albert Harkness
- Architectural style: Late 19th And 20th Century Revivals
- MPS: Rehoboth MRA
- NRHP reference No.: 83000634
- Added to NRHP: June 6, 1983

Bramble Hill is a historic house in Worcester, Massachusetts. The two-story masonry house was built c. 1923–28 to a design by Providence architect Albert Harkness, and is a locally unique example of the French Norman Revival style. The exterior is in fieldstone, and its interior features extensive mahogany trim. The entry hall has a basket-weave brick floor, and the main hall has a large stone fireplace and parquet floor. It was commissioned by Doris Mather Briggs, a relative of the locally prominent Carpenter family, and is one of the few houses in the town for which an architect is known.

The house was listed on the National Register of Historic Places in 1983.

== See also ==
- National Register of Historic Places listings in Bristol County, Massachusetts
