= Luther House =

Historic house in Massachusetts, United States

- U.S. National Register of Historic Places
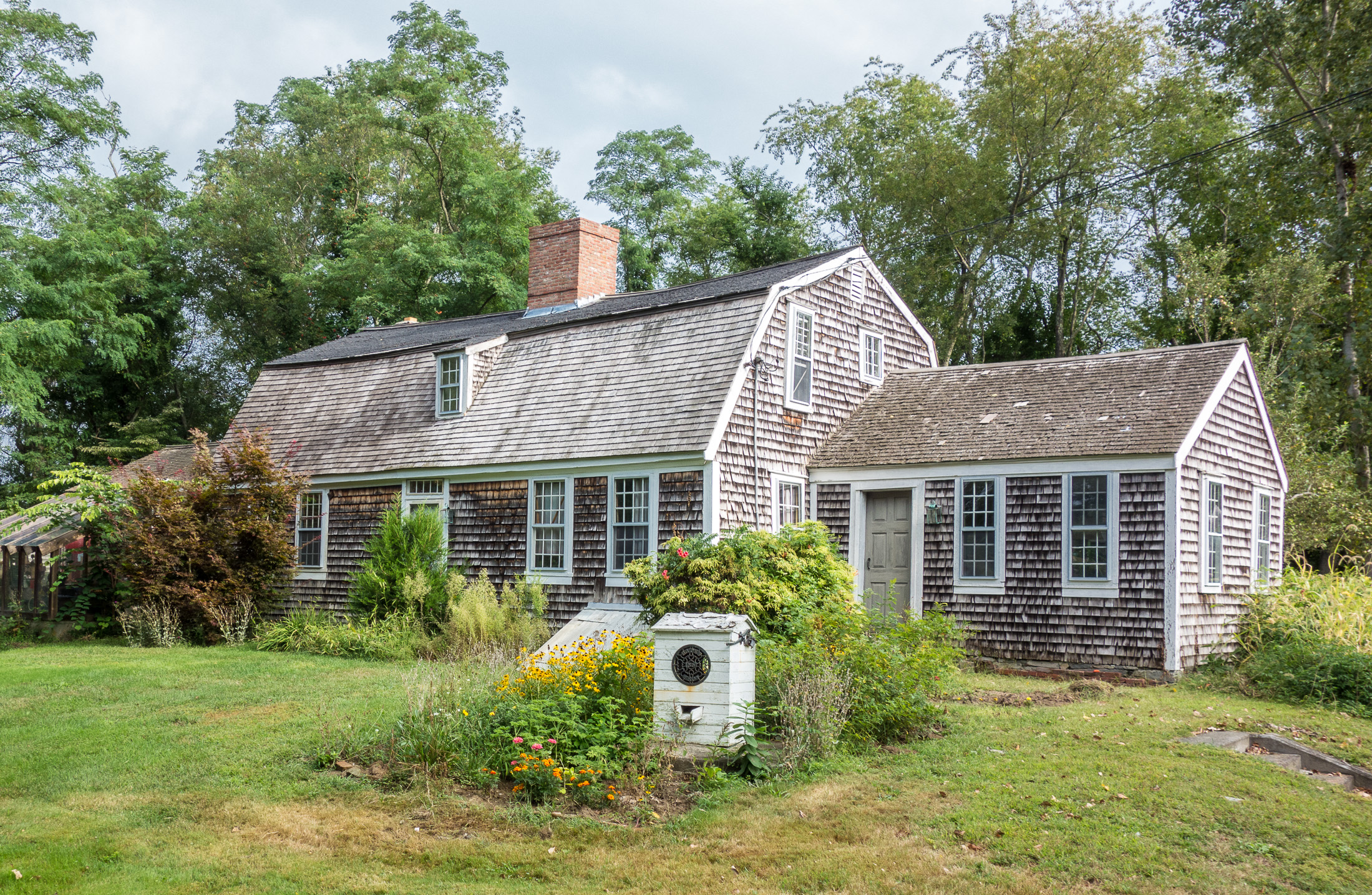
- Luther House in 2013

- Location within Massachusetts Location within the United States
- Location: 177 Market Street, Swansea, Massachusetts
- Coordinates: 41°45′52″N 71°16′9″W
- Built: 1740
- Architectural style: Georgian
- MPS: Swansea MRA
- NRHP reference No.: 90000073
- Added to NRHP: August 8, 1990

The Luther House is a historic house in Swansea, Massachusetts. It is a 1 1/2-story gambrel-roofed wood-frame house, five bays wide, with a central chimney and wooden shingle siding. Its main facade is symmetrically arranged, with a center entrance that has a transom window above. An ell extends to the right side, and dormers in the roof are a later addition. The house was built c. 1740, probably by Hezekiah Luther, son of John Luther, the first of that name to settle the area. It was long associated with the Luthers, a locally prominent family, whose members owned this house until the mid-20th century.

The house was listed on the National Register of Historic Places in 1990.

== See also ==
- National Register of Historic Places listings in Bristol County, Massachusetts
