= Anawan Club Clubhouse and Caretaker's House =

Historic buildings in Massachusetts, United States

- U.S. National Register of Historic Places
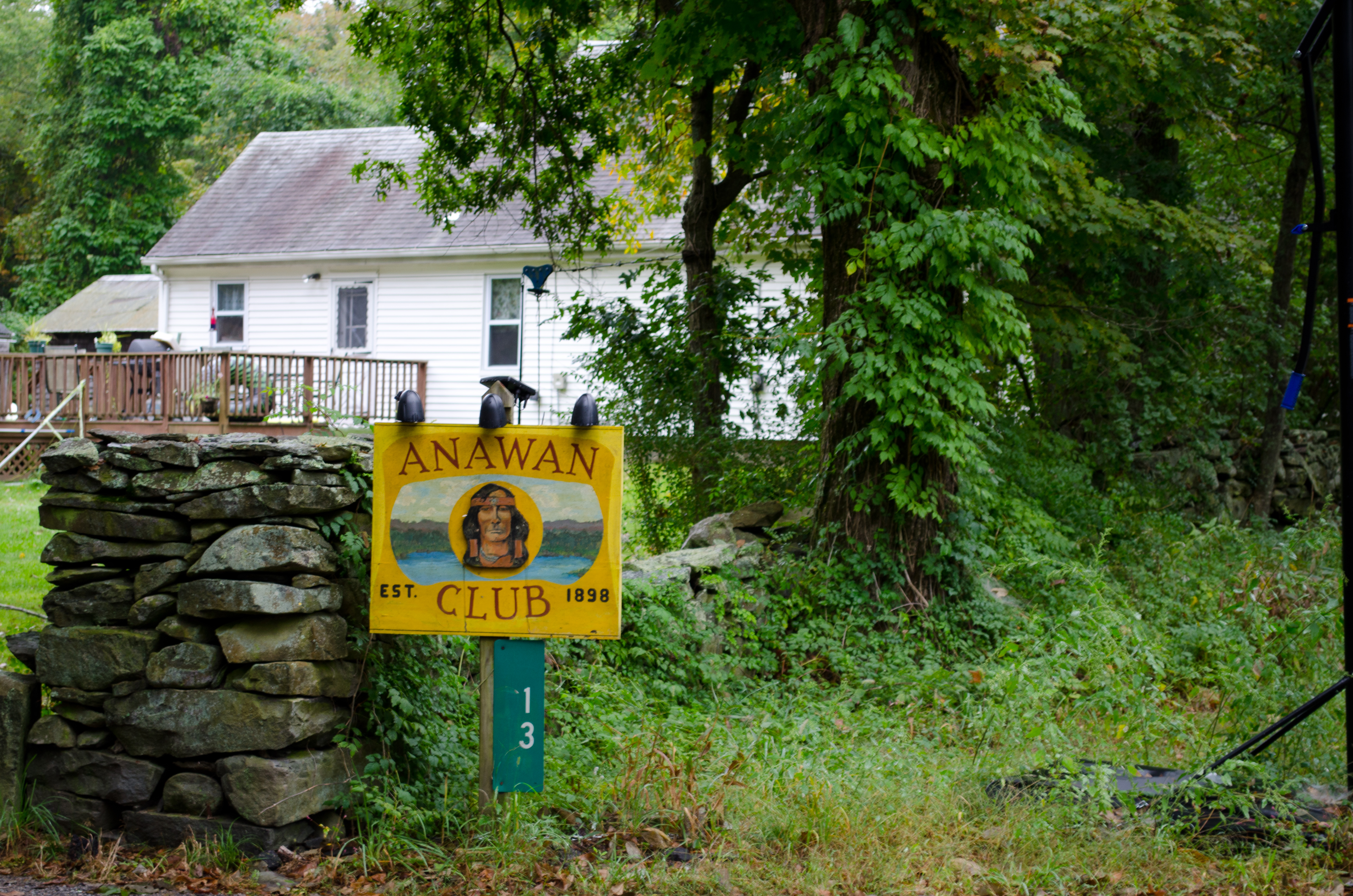

- Location within Massachusetts Location within the United States
- Location: 13 Gorham Street, Rehoboth, Massachusetts
- Coordinates: 41°49′35″N 71°13′25″W
- Built: 1898
- Architectural style: Georgian
- MPS: Rehoboth MRA
- NRHP reference No.: 83000618
- Added to NRHP: June 6, 1983

The Anawan Club Clubhouse and Caretaker's House are a pair of historic buildings in Rehoboth, Massachusetts, on the grounds of the Anawan Club, a private recreational club.

The clubhouse is a log building built in 1898 on the shore of Warren Upper Reservoir as a hunting and fishing lodge. It was built from locally-cut cedar trees, and consists of a single large chamber flanked by fieldstone chimneys, with a small service ell. The caretaker's house is a much older 1 1/2-story Cape style house, probably built between 1750 and 1780 by a member of the Kelton family. It is a well-preserve local example of this vernacular form.

The property was added to the National Register of Historic Places in 1983.

== See also ==
- National Register of Historic Places listings in Bristol County, Massachusetts
