= Spring Brook Cemetery =

Historic in Bristol County, Massachusetts, US

- U.S. National Register of Historic Places
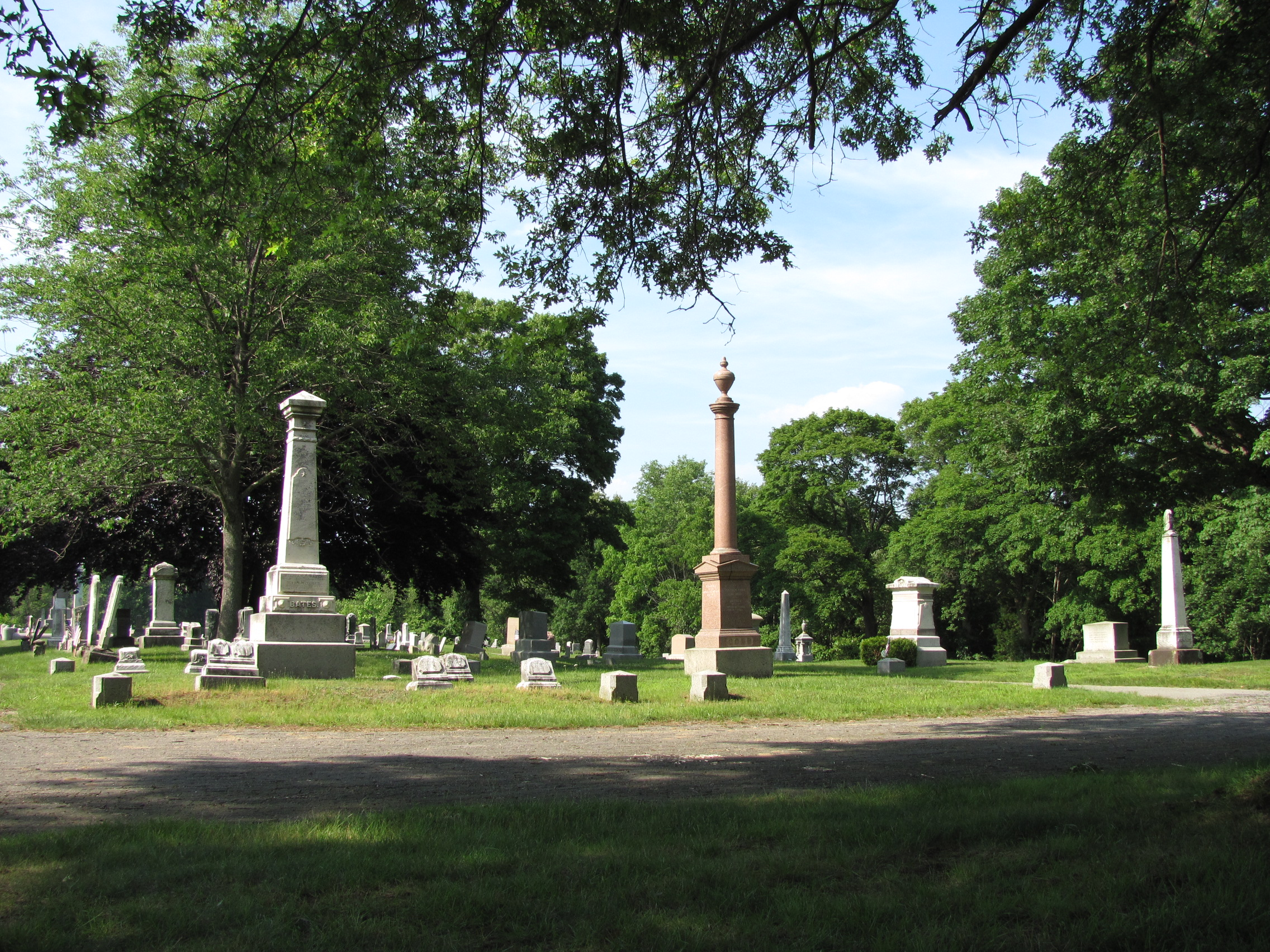
- Spring Brook Cemetery

- Location within Massachusetts Location within the United States
- Location: Mansfield, Massachusetts
- Coordinates: 42°1′13″N 71°13′22″W
- Area: 22 acres (8.9 ha)
- Built: 1860
- Architect: Eastman, Charles; et al.
- Architectural style: Romanesque
- NRHP reference No.: 07001240
- Added to NRHP: December 6, 2007

Spring Brook Cemetery is an historic cemetery on Spring Street in Mansfield, Massachusetts. It was established in 1860 as a private cemetery on a 4-acre (1.6 ha) parcel of land, and has grown over time to 22 acres (8.9 ha), and is now the largest of Mansfield's cemeteries. The area appears to have been used as a cemetery before its formal establishment; there are a number of graves that predate 1850, the oldest of which is marked 1790. The most prominent structure in the cemetery is the Card Memorial Chapel, designed by Charles Eastman and built in 1898 with funding from Simon and Mary Card, in memory of their daughter Lulu.

The cemetery was listed on the National Register of Historic Places in 2007.

== See also ==
- National Register of Historic Places listings in Bristol County, Massachusetts
