= Capt. Joel Robinson House =

Historic house in Massachusetts, United States

- U.S. National Register of Historic Places
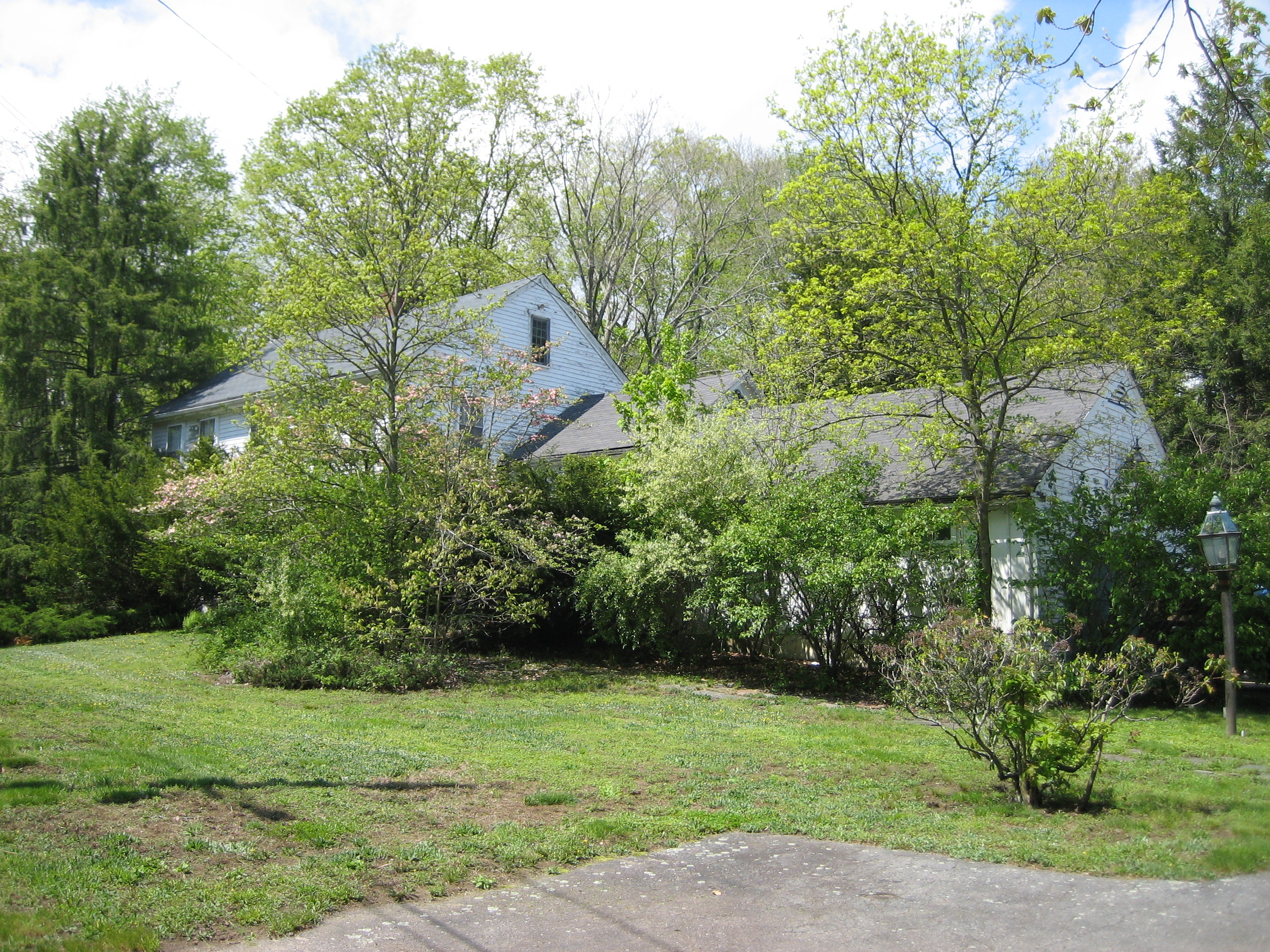

- Location within Massachusetts Location within the United States
- Location: Attleboro, Massachusetts
- Coordinates: 41°56′17″N 71°19′57″W
- Built: 1790
- Architect: Joel Robinson
- NRHP reference No.: 78000428
- Added to NRHP: November 20, 1978

The Capt. Joel Robinson House is a historic house at 111 Rocklawn Avenue in Attleboro, Massachusetts. The 2 1/2-story wood-frame house was built by Joel Robinson in 1790, and has remained in the hands of at least ten generations of descendants. The Federal style house is five bays wide and two deep, with a central chimney. Its main entry is flanked by pilasters and topped by a fanlight window and broken gable pediment. An ell extends to the right, joining the main house to a garage added in 1958.

The house was listed on the National Register of Historic Places in 1978.

== See also ==
- National Register of Historic Places listings in Bristol County, Massachusetts
