= Daniel Bliss Homestead =

Historic house in Massachusetts, United States

- U.S. National Register of Historic Places
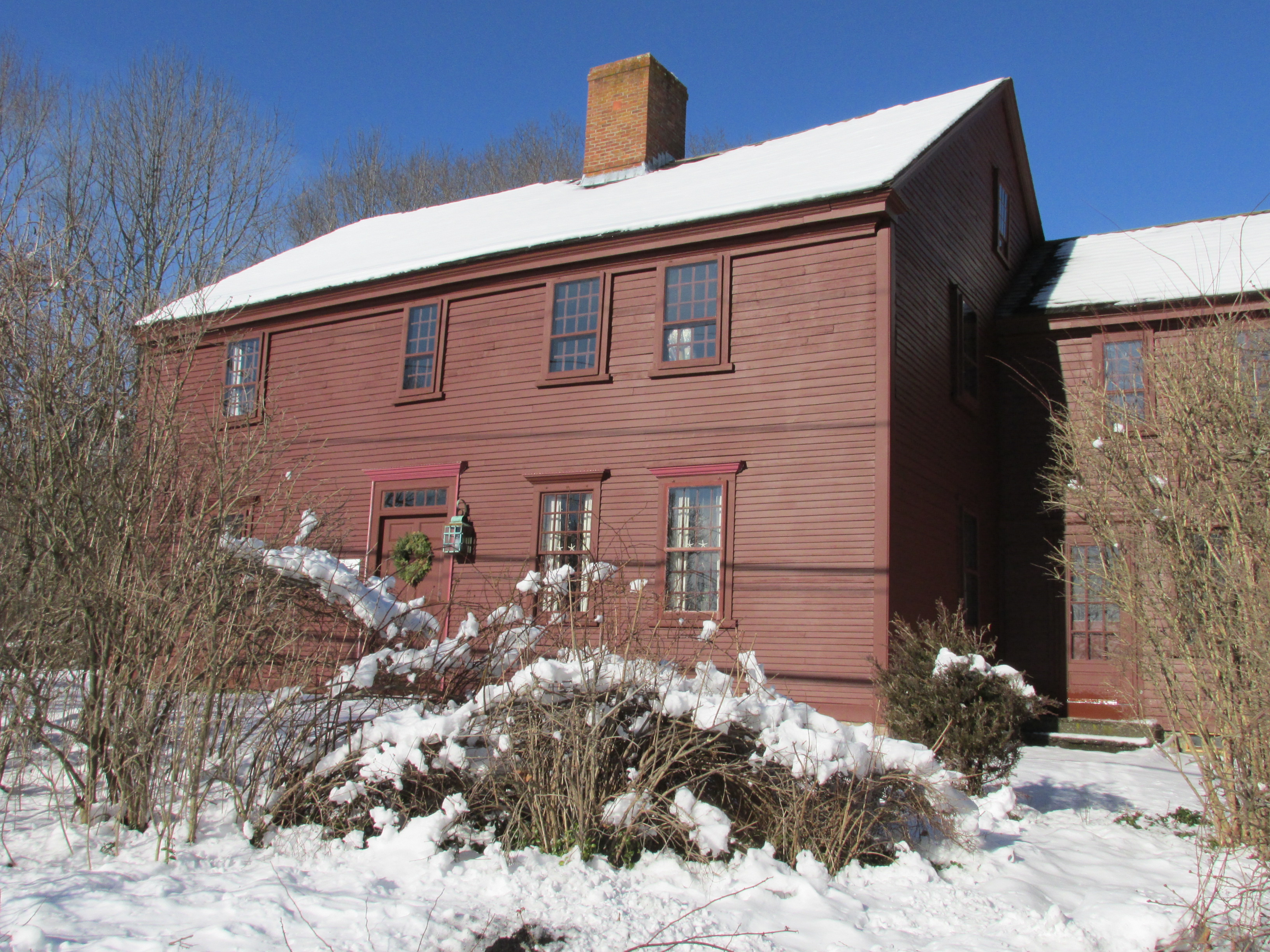
- Daniel Bliss Homestead

- Location within Massachusetts Location within the United States
- Location: 76 Homestead Ave., Rehoboth, Massachusetts
- Coordinates: 41°52′43″N 71°15′53″W
- Built: 1750
- Architectural style: Georgian
- MPS: Rehoboth MRA
- NRHP reference No.: 83000626
- Added to NRHP: June 6, 1983

The Daniel Bliss Homestead is a historic colonial farmhouse at 76 Homestead Avenue in Rehoboth, Massachusetts.

== Description and history ==
The 2 1/2-story main block of this wood-framed house was built in about 1741, and is a typical Georgian five-bay wide, center-chimney structure. Two ells were added to the east end in the 19th century. The house has retained many Georgian details because one owner, while renovating the house, removed and carefully stored the elements, which were restored c. 1970 by a later owner.

The house was listed on the National Register of Historic Places in 1983.

== See also ==
- National Register of Historic Places listings in Bristol County, Massachusetts

== Bibliography ==
- Snape, Susan E., "In Old Rehoboth, Book I," Tauton: William S. Sullwold Publishing, 1979 (Reprinted 2010 by Signature Printing).
