= East Attleborough Academy =

- U.S. National Register of Historic Places
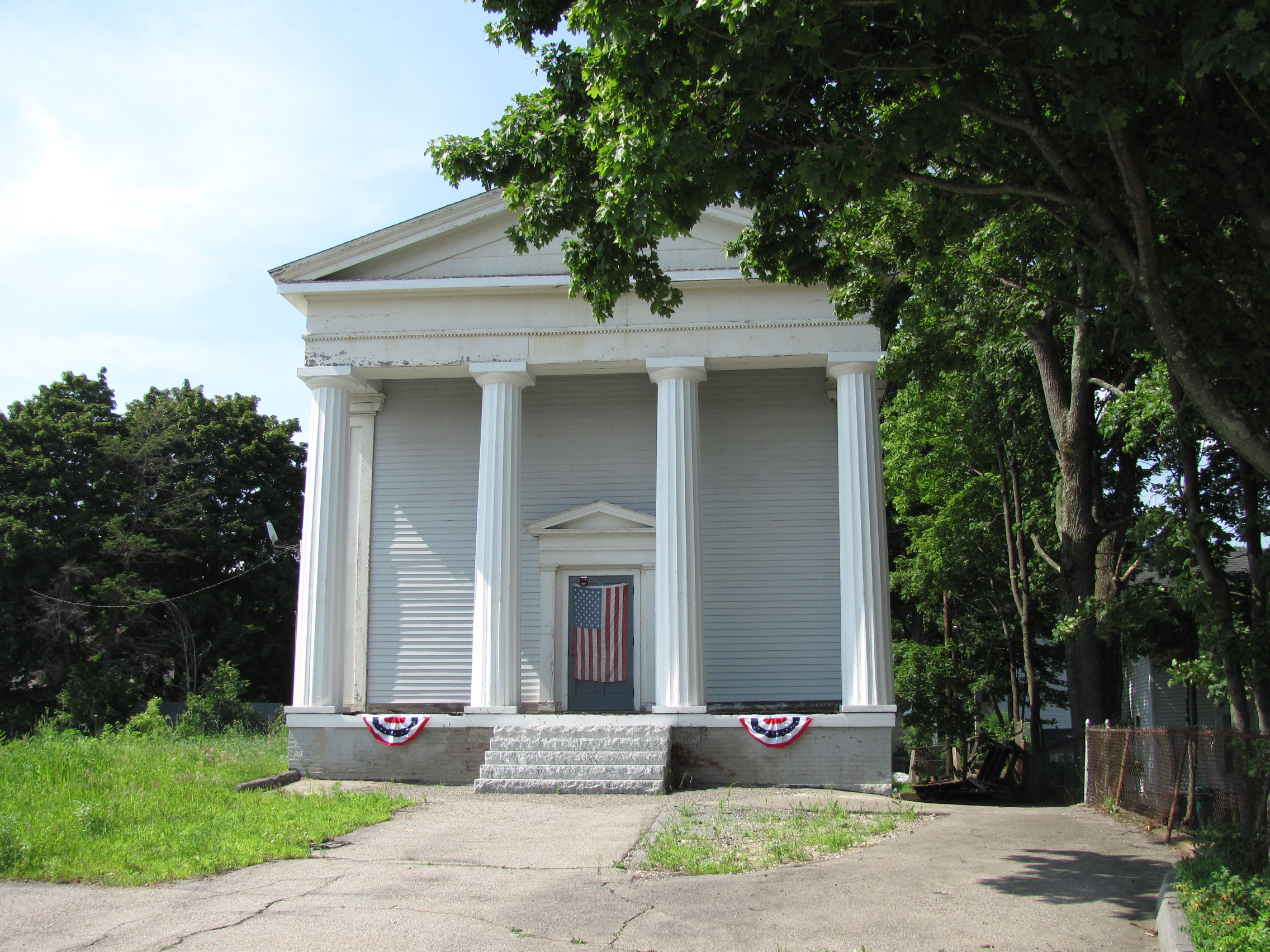
- East Attleborough Academy

- Location within Massachusetts Location within the United States
- Location: Attleboro, Massachusetts
- Coordinates: 41°56′46″N 71°17′6″W
- Built: 1843
- Architectural style: Greek Revival
- NRHP reference No.: 85000694
- Added to NRHP: April 4, 1985

The East Attleborough Academy is an historic former school building at 28 Sanford Street in Attleboro, Massachusetts. Built in 1843, it is the town's only example of a Greek Revival temple front building. It originally served as a private academy, and has since served as the town's first high school, and as an office building. It is now home to the town's historical society. The building was listed on the National Register of Historic Places in 1985.

== Description and history ==
The former East Attleborough Academy building is located on the north side of the Attleboro's town center, on the north side of Sanford Street, where it shares a lot with a municipal parking lot. It is a two-story wood-frame structure, with a gabled roof and clapboarded exterior. Its prominent feature is the Greek Revival temple facade, in which four fluted Doric columns rise to an entablature and fully pedimented gable. It is set on a brick foundation that was built on top of its original stone foundation, the building having been moved twice. The main entrance is at the center of the facade behind this portico, which is otherwise unadorned; it is flanked by fluted pilasters. The building corners sport paneled pilasters, and the sides each have four regularly spaced windows. A two-story ell extends to the rear of the main block.

The school was built in 1843 as a private academy, a role it served until 1864. In 1867, the town leased the building from its private owners to house its first public high school. It was moved a short distance (records are unclear on exactly where) in 1874, and was moved back to its original location in 1889, albeit on a new brick foundation. The high school vacated the premises in 1882. In 1900 it housed the offices of the town's school superintendent, and in 1920 the town finally purchased the building.

The building now houses the local historical society. Architecturally, it is the only example of a Greek Revival temple front in the town, either institutional or residential.

== See also ==
- National Register of Historic Places listings in Bristol County, Massachusetts
