= Smuggler's House =

Historic house in Massachusetts, United States

- U.S. National Register of Historic Places
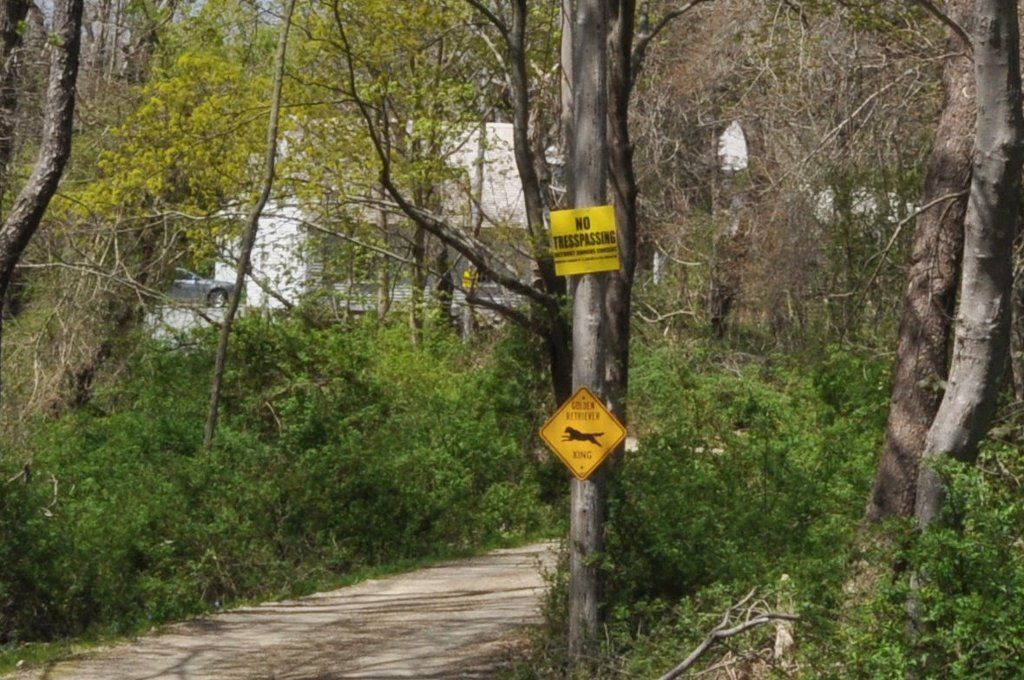

- Location within Massachusetts Location within the United States
- Location: 361 Pearse Road, Swansea, Massachusetts
- Coordinates: 41°44′5″N 71°13′26″W
- Built: 1800
- Architectural style: Federal
- MPS: Swansea MRA
- NRHP reference No.: 90000065
- Added to NRHP: February 16, 1990

Smuggler's House is a historic house in Swansea, Massachusetts. It is a 1 1/2-story Cape style farmhouse, five bays wide, with a side gable roof, a chimney that is slightly off-center, and a pair of gabled dormers. Its main entry is flanked by pilasters and topped by a five-light transom window. The house was built c. 1800, and is substantially unaltered. It was supposedly used as a place to store smuggled goods during the War of 1812.

The house was listed on the National Register of Historic Places in 1990.

== See also ==
- National Register of Historic Places listings in Bristol County, Massachusetts
