= Towne Street Historic District =

Historic district in Massachusetts, United States

- U.S. National Register of Historic Places
- U.S. Historic district
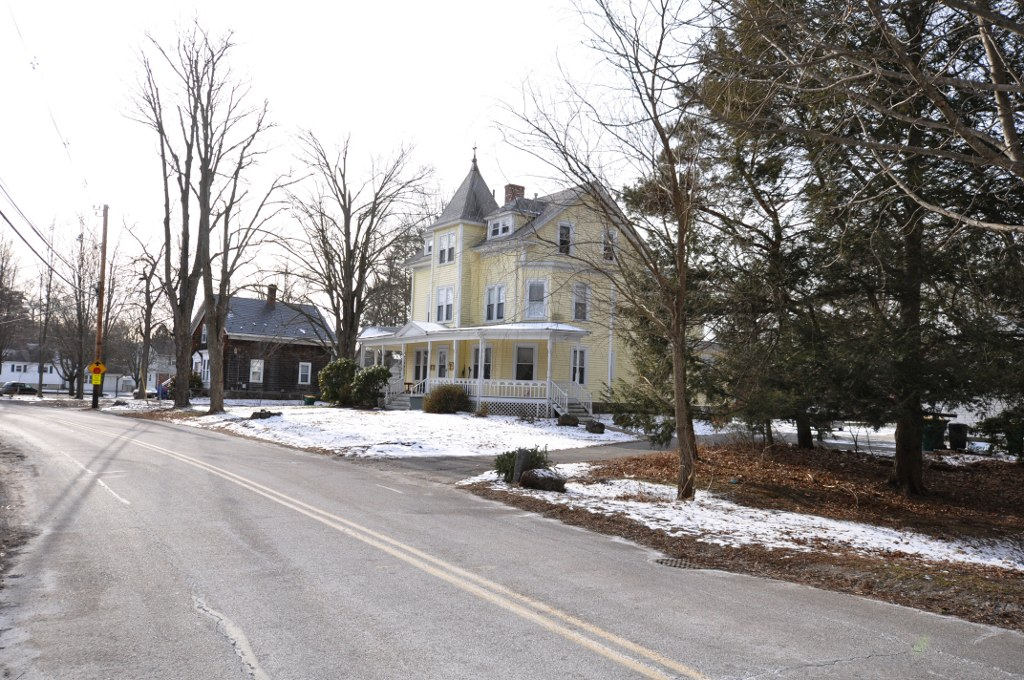
- 224 Towne St.

- Location within Massachusetts Location within the United States
- Location: North Attleborough, Massachusetts
- Coordinates: 41°58′21″N 71°18′44″W
- Area: 5.9 acres (2.4 ha)
- Architectural style: Greek Revival, Federal
- NRHP reference No.: 03001210
- Added to NRHP: November 26, 2003

The Towne Street Historic District is a historic district on Towne Street, east of Jackson Street in North Attleborough, Massachusetts. Included in the district are numbers 224, 240, 251, and 260 Towne Street. It encompasses a collection of widely spaced rural-suburban houses built in the middle decades of the 19th century. The district was added to the National Register of Historic Places in 2003.

== Description and history ==
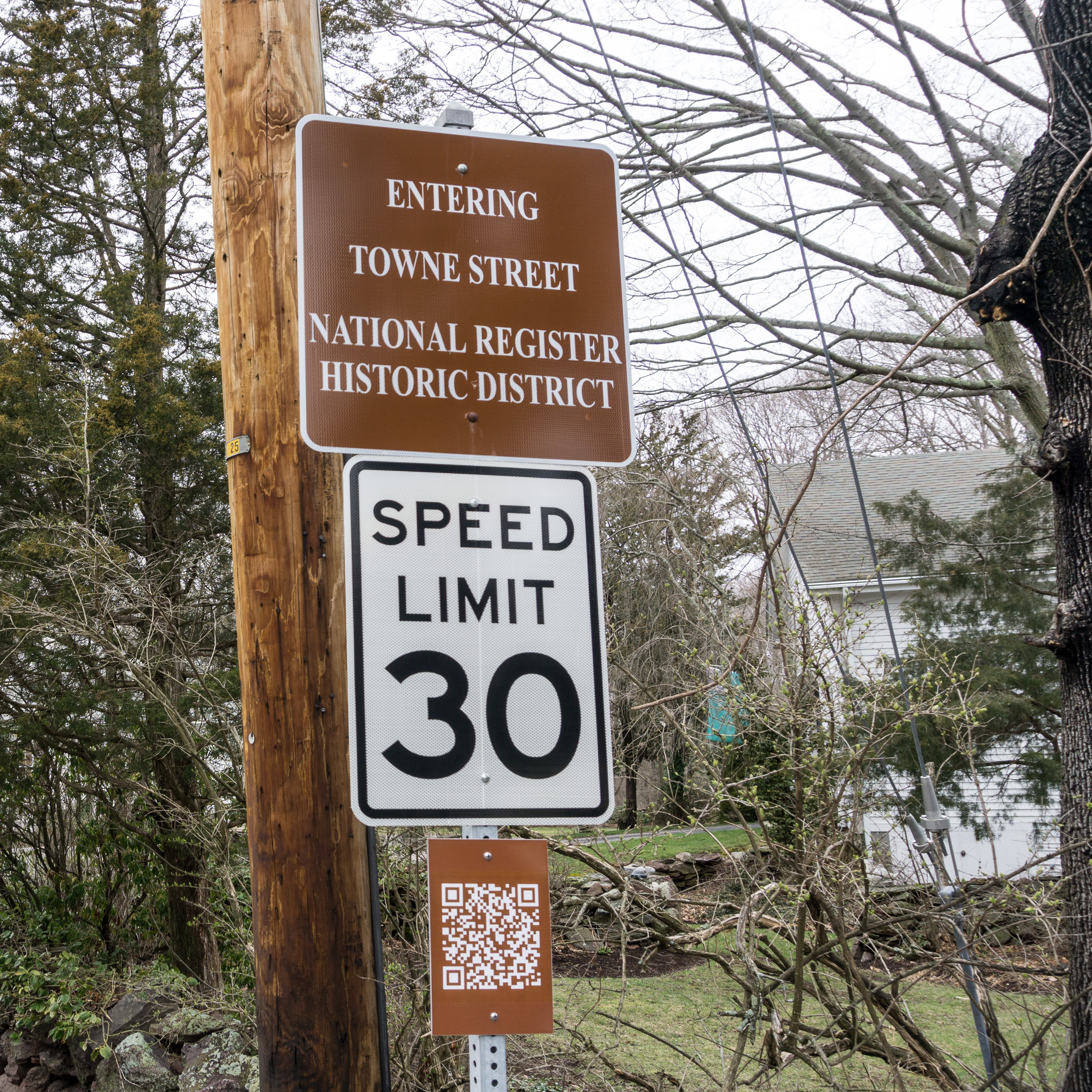
Towne Street Historic District sign

Towne Street is located in central eastern North Attleborough, on the fringe of the Attleborough Falls area that was the site of major industrial economic activity in the 19th century. The street was a rural lane from an early period, and the stretch between Jackson Street and Stanley Street was not built on until the 1830s, prior to the industrial development of the Falls. The widely spaced houses and rural feel have been retained since that time.

The first houses built on the street were the Stanley House (260 Towne Street, c. 1835) and the Thomas Wilmarth House (251 Towne Street, c. 1850). Both are Greek Revival in character, with five-bay facades and centered entrances, but the older house has a central chimney (reminiscent of older Federal and colonial styles), and has a less fully realized Greek Revival treatment present in the Wilmarth House. The Wilmarth house was enlarged in the 1880s, adding some Gothic features. The Miller House (240 Towne Street), was built c. 1870, and is a vernacular structure with an ornate Italianate bracketed hood over the entrance. The Edwin Wilmarth House was built about 1880, and has a porch with spindled balustrade, and a three-story tower characteristic of the Queen Anne period.

== See also ==
- National Register of Historic Places listings in Bristol County, Massachusetts
