= William Luther House =

Historic house in Massachusetts, United States

- U.S. National Register of Historic Places
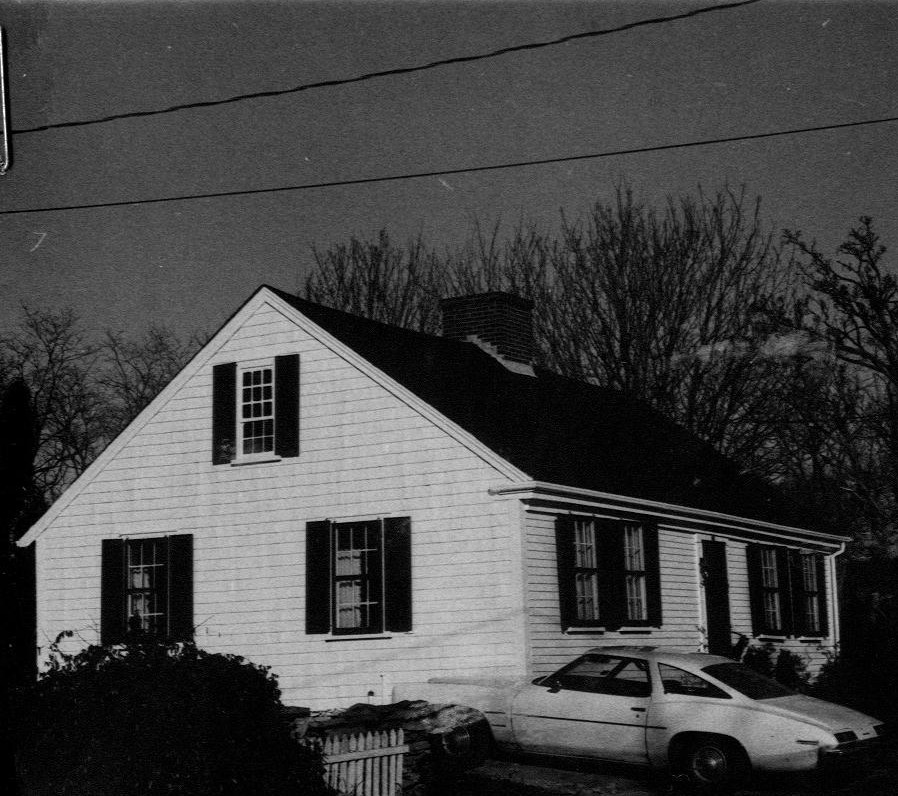
- c. 1979

- Location within Massachusetts Location within the United States
- Location: 79 Old Warren Road, Swansea, Massachusetts
- Coordinates: 41°44′46″N 71°13′16″W
- Built: 1849
- Architectural style: Greek Revival
- MPS: Swansea MRA
- NRHP reference No.: 90000067
- Added to NRHP: February 16, 1990

The William Luther House was a historic house in Swansea, Massachusetts. It was a 1 1/2-story wood-frame Cape style house, five bays wide, with a side-gable roof, central chimney, clapboard siding on the front and wooden shingles on the sides. The front door was an original vertical board door. An ell extended to the rear of the house, added in the late 19th or early 20th century. The house was built c. 1849, and was a well-preserved example of Greek Revival styling. The house was for many years owned by members of the locally prominent Buffington family.

The house was listed on the National Register of Historic Places in 1990. The house was demolished shortly after listing in the National Register; a demolition permit was issued for the property in 1991, and the house standing at that address is no longer the described building. The state lists the house as demolished in its historic resources database.

== See also ==
- National Register of Historic Places listings in Bristol County, Massachusetts
