= Hill School (South Dartmouth, Massachusetts) =

- U.S. National Register of Historic Places
- U.S. Historic district – Contributing property
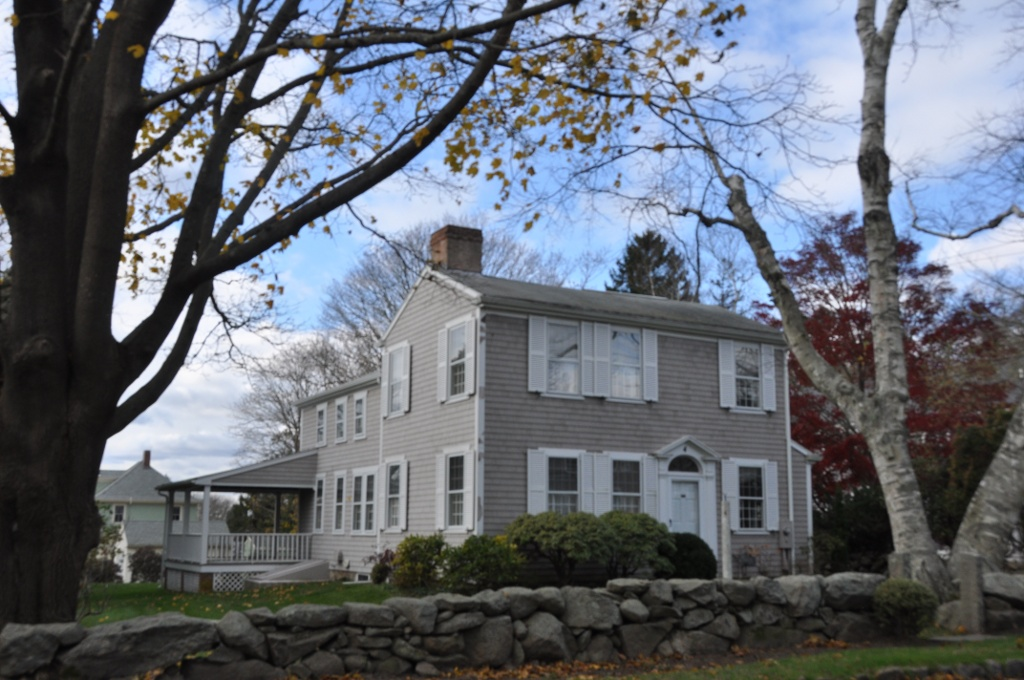

- Location within Massachusetts Location within the United States
- Location: South Dartmouth, Massachusetts
- Coordinates: 41°35′13″N 70°56′25″W
- Built: 1805
- Architectural style: Federal
- Part of: Padanaram Village Historic District (ID85002010)
- NRHP reference No.: 80000432

Significant dates
- Added to NRHP: April 11, 1980
- Designated CP: September 5, 1985

The Hill School is a historic school building (now a private residence) at 4 Middle Street in the Padanaram village of Dartmouth, Massachusetts. The two-story wood-frame structure was built c. 1806, and was established by the area's early settlers as a cooperative venture. It has a "3/4" facade, with three asymmetrically placed windows on each floor, and an off-center entry between two of them, with no window above. The building was moved about 450 feet (140 m) in 1912 to its present location.

The building was listed on the National Register of Historic Places in 1980.
