= Greater Taunton Area =

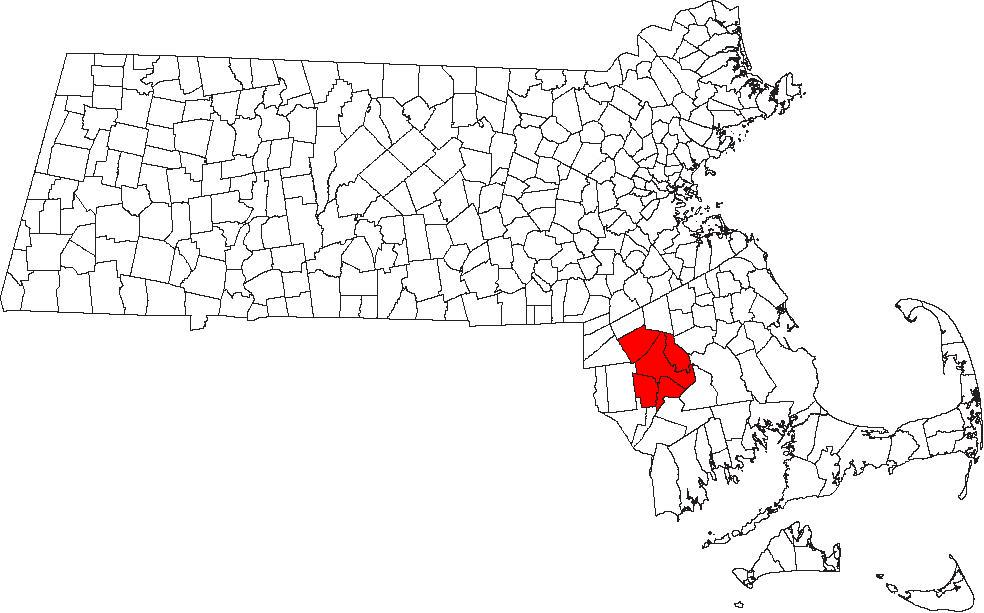
A map of the Greater Taunton Area

The Greater Taunton Area is the suburban area surrounding the city of Taunton, in northeastern Bristol County, Massachusetts. It comprises various present-day municipalities that were once under the jurisdiction of Taunton in Colonial America. These present-day municipalities include the towns of Berkley, Dighton, Norton, and Raynham.

== See also ==
- Berkley, Massachusetts
- Bristol County, Massachusetts
- Dighton, Massachusetts
- Dighton Rock and Dighton Rock State Park
- Massasoit State Park
- Norton, Massachusetts
- Raynham, Massachusetts
- Silver City Galleria
- Taunton, Massachusetts
- Taunton River
- Taunton River Watershed
