= Finnur Magnússon =

Icelandic scholar and archaeologist

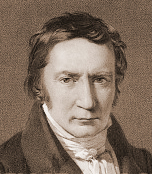
Finnur Magnússon

Finnur Magnússon, sometimes referred to by the Danish version of his name under which he published, Finno Magnusun, Finn Magnussen or Magnusen, (27 August 1781 – 24 December 1847) was an Icelandic scholar and archaeologist who worked in Denmark.

== Biography ==
Finnur Magnússon was born in Skálholt, Iceland. He was the grandchild of Finnur Jónsson, Bishop of Skálholt. He claimed descent from Ári Marsson, who according to the Landnámabók discovered Hvítramannaland near Vinland.

Finnur studied law at the University of Copenhagen and returned to Iceland to work in Reykjavík, where he became a clerk in the superior court in 1806. In 1812 he returned to Denmark to study Old Norse literature and history and in 1815 became a professor of literature at Copenhagen. In 1819, he was assigned to hold lectures in Norse literature and mythology at the university and the Academy of Art. In 1823 he obtained a position at the King's private archive, and in 1829 became its head. In 1836 he earned his doctorate. He represented Iceland and the Faroes on the Østifternes Stænderforsamling and in 1839 was appointed to represent it on the Danish provincial advisory council (Rådgivende provinsialstænderforsamlinger).

He was a founder member of the Icelandic Literary Society (Hið Íslenzka Bókmenntafélag, Det Islandske Litterære Selskab), for ten years summarised domestic and world news for its annual publication, Íslenzk sagnablöð, and wrote the first issue when it became Skírnir. With Carl Christian Rafn and others, he founded the Royal Norse Ancient Writings Society (Det Kongelige nordiske Oldskriftselskab). He is most remembered for his translation and exposition of the Elder Edda. His masterpiece, first published in 1824, was Eddalæren og dens Oprindelse (The Eddic Lore and its Origin). In it he was one of the first to put forward a Romantic, nature-mythological view of the Norse myths. For example, he regarded the valkyries as heavenly lights such as meteors and the Aurora Borealis. He was elected a member of the American Antiquarian Society in 1836.

He was interested in and called on for his expertise in runes, but his scholarship in this area was weaker. He declared the Dighton Rock petroglyphs in Rhode Island to be runic. He was involved in an academic controversy when he claimed to have deciphered a skaldic verse in runes on the Runamo rockface in Sweden; in 1844 the marks were shown to be natural. He also misinterpreted the Ruthwell Cross runes.

He saw no conflict between Danish and Icelandic nationalism, and regarded Danish as his second native language; while still a student he published a book of poems in Danish (Ubetydeligheder - Inconsequentialities, 1800), and he also wrote Icelandic poetry.

He was married in 1821 to Nicoline Frydensberg (1804–1886), born in Reykjavík, but the marriage was dissolved in 1840. In his final years he had money problems and sold Icelandic manuscripts from his collection to the Bodleian Library, the British Museum and the Advocates' Library in Edinburgh, apparently overcharging the first two. He died in Copenhagen.

== Selected works ==
- Udsigt over de kaukasiske Menneskestammers ældste Hjemsted og Udvandringer (1818)
- Bidrag til nordisk Archæologie (1820), in which he maintained the Norse myths to be as appropriate as those of the Greeks for artistic representation
- Den Ældre Edda: En samling af de nordiske folks ældste sagn og sange (1821–23)
  - Odin's Ravnes sang eller Fortale-Digtet
- Magnuson, F. (1822). De Annulo aureo Runicis Characteribus signato, nuper in Anglia invento, et pluribus ejusdem Generis, brevis Dissertatio. Archaeologia Aeliana Series 1. Vol 1, p. 136.
- Eddalæren og dens oprindelse (1824–26)
- Priscae veterum borealium mythologiae lexicon (1828)
- Catalogus Criticus Et Historico-Literarius Codicum ClIII Manuscriptorum Borealium (1832)
- Grønlands historiske Mindesmærker (3 vols., 1838–42, with Carl Christian Rafn)
- Runamo og Runerne (1841)
- Antiquités russes (2 vols., 1850–52, with Carl Christian Rafn)

== Sources ==
- N.M. Petersen, "Finn Magnusen's literære Personlighed" in Samlede Afhandlinger volume 3 (Copenhagen: Wibes, 1873) (in Danish)
- Aðalgeir Kristjánsson, Nú heilsar þér á Hafnarslóð, pp. 35–59 (in Icelandic)
- Jón Helgason, "Finnur Magnússon" in Ritgerðakorn og ræðustúfar (Reykjavík: Félag íslenzkra stúdenta í Kaupmannahöfn, 1959), pp. 171–96 (in Icelandic)
- Helga Skúladottir and Sigfús A. Schopka, "Landkönnuðurinn og Leyndarskjalavörðurinn", Morgunblaðið 20 July 1996 (in Icelandic)
- Ulrich Schnell, Runerne på Runamo (in Danish)
- Ripley, George; Dana, Charles A., eds. (1879). "Magnusson, Finn" . The American Cyclopædia.
