= Edmund B. Delabarre =

American scientist

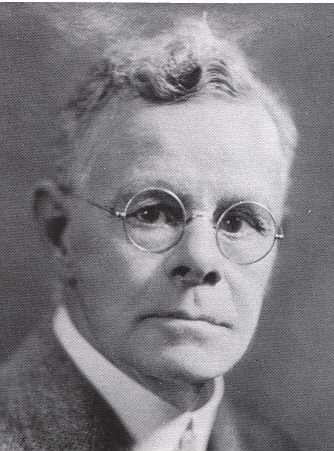
Professor Edmund B. Delabarre (c. 1900).

Edmund Burke Delabarre (September 25, 1863 in Dover, Maine– 1945), was a researcher and professor of psychology at Brown University. He graduated from Amherst College in 1886. He was a pioneer in the field of shape perception and on the interaction between mental processes and the involuntary movements of the body.

He became famous, particularly in Portugal, because of his interpretation of the inscriptions present on the surface of Dighton Rock, a boulder on the shore of the Taunton River, in southeastern Massachusetts. He attributed the carvings to Miguel Corte-Real, a Portuguese navigator who left Lisbon in May 1502 on an exploration trip to the western Atlantic, never to return. Delabarre claimed that the stone bears carvings of the coat of arms of Portugal, the name of Miguel Corte-Real, and the date 1511.

In 1899, Delabarre was instrumental in formation of the University Club in Providence

== Works ==
- Über Bewegungsempfindungen. Freiburg in Baden, Epstein, 1891
- The force and rapidity of reaction movement (with R. R. Logan and O. F. Reed). Psychological Review 4: 615–631, 1897
- Les laboratoires de psychologie en Amérique. L'Année Psychologique 1: 209–255, 1894
- Recent History of Dighton Rock Wilson and Son, Cambridge, MA. 1919. pdf
- The Inscribed Rocks of Narrgansett Bay. Volume XV No. 1 Rhode Island Historical Collections January 1922
