= Berkley, Massachusetts =

- Town
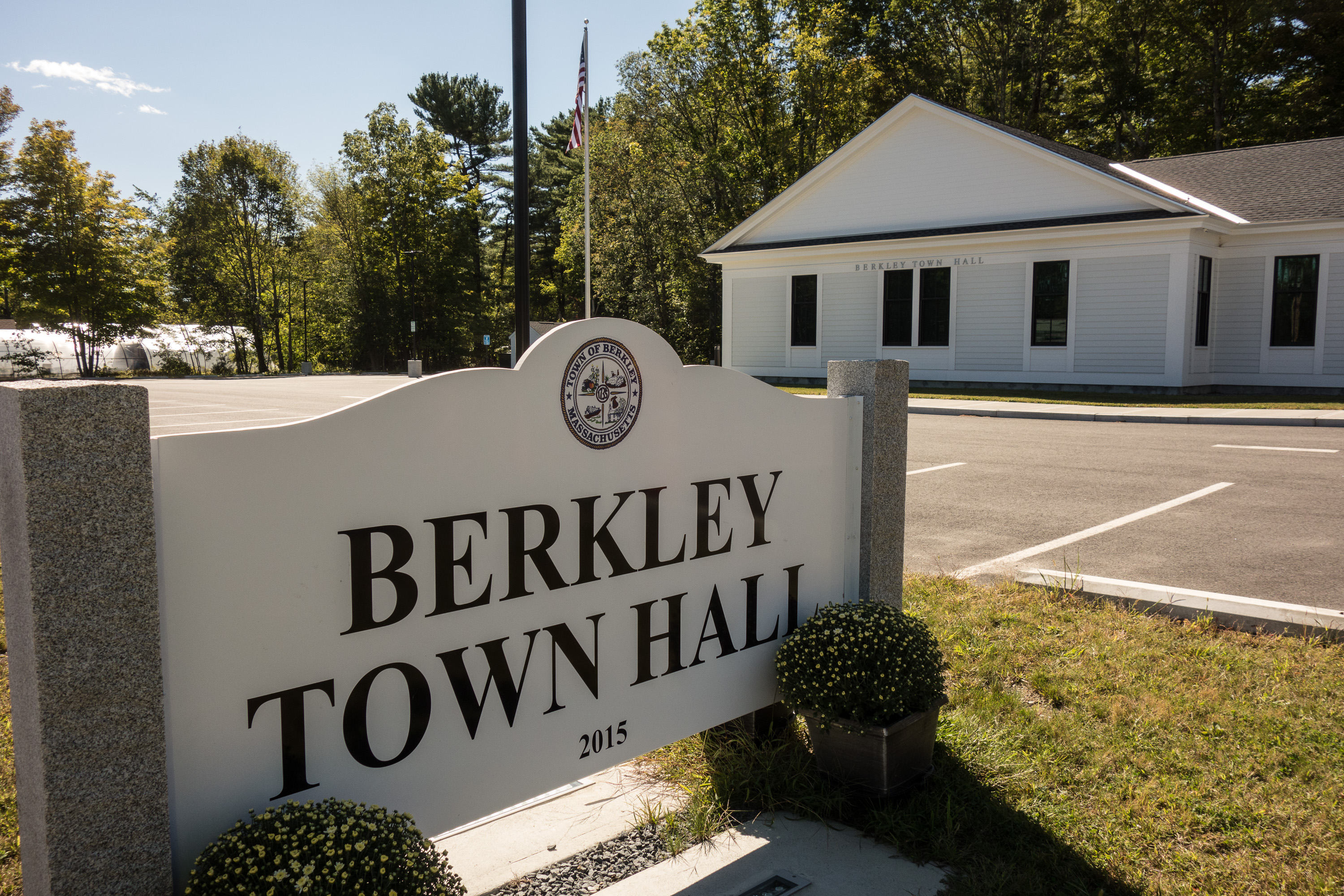
- Berkley's new Town Hall was opened in 2015

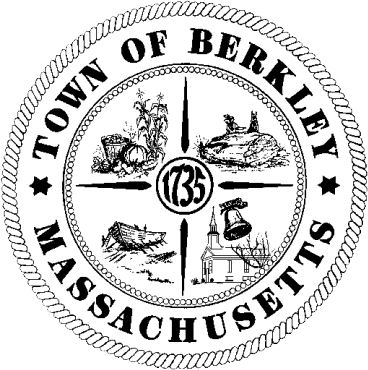
- Seal

- Location in Bristol County in Massachusetts
- Coordinates: 41°50′45″N 71°05′00″W
- Country: United States
- State: Massachusetts
- County: Bristol
- Settled: 1638
- Incorporated: 1735

Government
  - Type: Open town meeting
  - Town Manager: Matt Chabot

Area
  - Total: 17.4 sq mi (45.1 km^{2})
  - Land: 16.5 sq mi (42.8 km^{2})
  - Water: 0.93 sq mi (2.4 km^{2})
- Elevation: 79 ft (24 m)

Population (2020)
  - Total: 6,763
  - Density: 409/sq mi (158/km^{2})
- Time zone: UTC-5 (Eastern)
  - Summer (DST): UTC-4 (Eastern)
- ZIP code: 02779
- Area code: 508 / 774
- FIPS code: 25-05280
- GNIS feature ID: 0619432
- Website: townofberkleyma.gov

Berkley is a town in Bristol County, Massachusetts, United States, located south of Boston and east of Providence, Rhode Island. The population was 6,764 according to the 2020 census, making it the least populated town in the county.

Berkley is a part of the South Coast region of Massachusetts which encompasses the cities and towns that surround Buzzards Bay (excluding the Elizabeth Islands, Bourne and Falmouth), Mount Hope Bay and the Sakonnet River.

== History ==
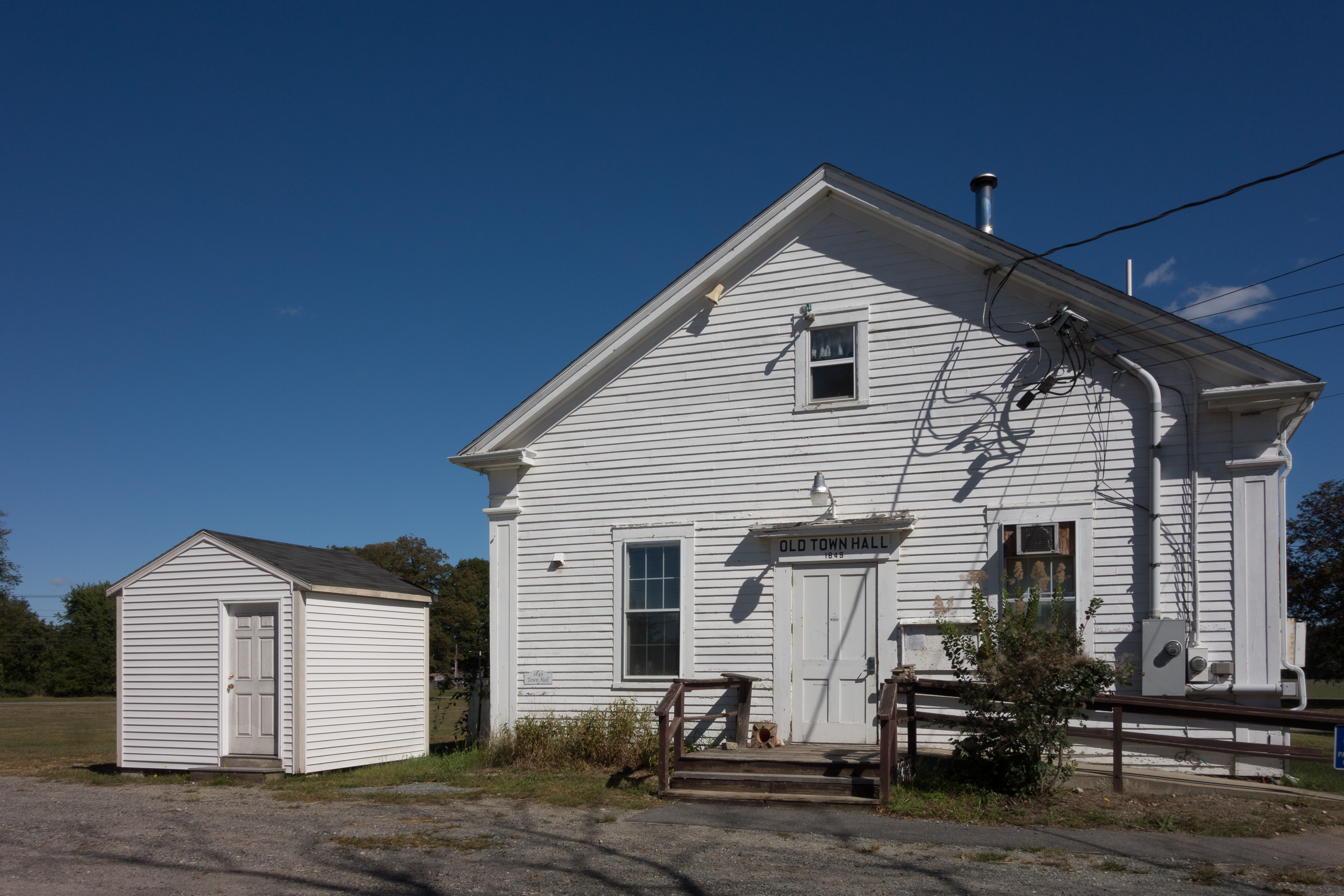
Old Town Hall was built in 1849

The present town of Berkley, then belonging to the neighboring towns of Dighton and Taunton, was first settled in 1638. It was officially incorporated as a separate town in 1735. The town was named for the philosopher and bishop George Berkeley (1685–1753), who lived in Newport, Rhode Island from 1728 to 1731. The change in the spelling to "Berkley" was likely due to the carelessness of the engrossing clerk of the Massachusetts General Court.

Berkley's old Town Hall, a two-story white clapboard building located on Berkley Common, was built in 1849. When a new Town Hall was built across the street in 2015, the Old Town Hall became home to the Berkley Historical Society. The new 9,778-square-foot Town Hall was built in 2014–2015, at a cost of $3.5 million. The new building contains a senior center, office, kitchen, and high-efficiency LED lighting.

== Geography ==
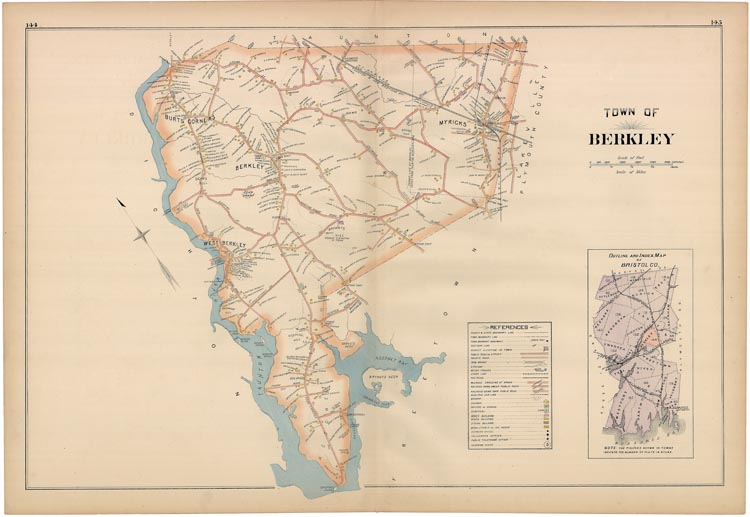
1895 map of Berkley

According to the United States Census Bureau, the town has a total area of 17.4 square miles (45.1 km^{2}), of which 16.5 square miles (42.8 km^{2}) is land and 0.93 square miles (2.4 km^{2}), or 5.24%, is water. The town is bordered by the Taunton River and Dighton to the west, Taunton to the north and northeast, Lakeville to the east, and the Assonet Bay and Freetown to the south. The town is located 35 miles (56 km) south of Boston, 22 miles (35 km) east of Providence, Rhode Island, and 30 miles (48 km) northwest of the Cape Cod Canal.

Near the southwestern corner of the town is Dighton Rock State Park, the home of Dighton Rock, a tidal boulder along the Taunton River that is well known for its strange markings, which have been totally or partly attributed to Norsemen, Wampanoags, or Portuguese explorer Miguel Corte-Real. At the southern tip of Berkley Neck which points into the confluence of the Taunton River and the Assonet River, there is a small island, named "Conspiracy Island", whose name origin remains obscure.

The highest point in Berkley is the summit of Bryant Hill near the southern border of the town, at 167 feet (51 m) above sea level.

The town can be accessed by two state routes, Route 24 and Route 79. Route 24, a four-lane divided freeway, bisects the town, and includes one exit for the town at Padelford Street. Route 79 passes along the town's border with Lakeville, and meets Route 140 just across the town line in Taunton. The Berkley–Dighton Bridge crosses the Taunton River to the Segreganset neighborhood of Dighton. The current bridge was completed in 2015, and is the only bridge to cross the river between the Brightman Street Bridge between Fall River and Somerset, and the Plain Street Bridge in Taunton, a distance of 12.5 miles (20.1 km).

Myricks is an association community or populated place (Class Code U6) and a junction of railroad lines in Berkley.

== Demographics ==
Historical population
Year	Pop.	±%
1790	850	—
1850	908	+6.8%
1860	825	−9.1%
1870	744	−9.8%
1880	927	+24.6%
1890	894	−3.6%
1900	949	+6.2%
1910	999	+5.3%
1920	935	−6.4%
1930	1,120	+19.8%
1940	1,130	+0.9%
1950	1,284	+13.6%
1960	1,609	+25.3%
1970	2,027	+26.0%
1980	2,731	+34.7%
1990	4,237	+55.1%
2000	5,749	+35.7%
2010	6,411	+11.5%
2020	6,764	+5.5%
2023*	6,822	+0.9%
Source: United States census records and Population Estimates Program data.

As of the census of 2000, there were 5,749 people, 1,843 households, and 1,566 families residing in the town. The population density was 347.6 inhabitants per square mile (134.2/km^{2}). There were 1,885 housing units at an average density of 114.0 per square mile (44.0/km^{2}). The racial makeup of the town was 96.7% White, 0.6% African American, 0.14% Native American, 0.4% Asian, 0.03% Pacific Islander, 1.06% from other races, and 1.11% from two or more races. Hispanic or Latino of any race were 1.0% of the population.

There were 1,843 households, out of which 47.1% had children under the age of 18 living with them, 73.8% were married couples living together, 7.5% had a female householder with no husband present, and 15.0% were non-families. 10.8% of all households were made up of individuals, and 3.9% had someone living alone who was 65 years of age or older. The average household size was 3.11 and the average family size was 3.35.

In the town, the population was spread out, with 30.5% under the age of 18, 6.0% from 18 to 24, 36.0% from 25 to 44, 21.1% from 45 to 64, and 6.5% who were 65 years of age or older. The median age was 35 years. For every 100 females, there were 98.7 males. For every 100 females age 18 and over, there were 97.3 males.

The median income for a household in the town was $66,295, and the median income for a family was $69,222. Males had a median income of $45,154 versus $31,639 for females. The per capita income for the town was $21,652. About 0.7% of families and 2.5% of the population were below the poverty line, including 0.6% of those under age 18 and 7.6% of those age 65 or over.

== Government ==
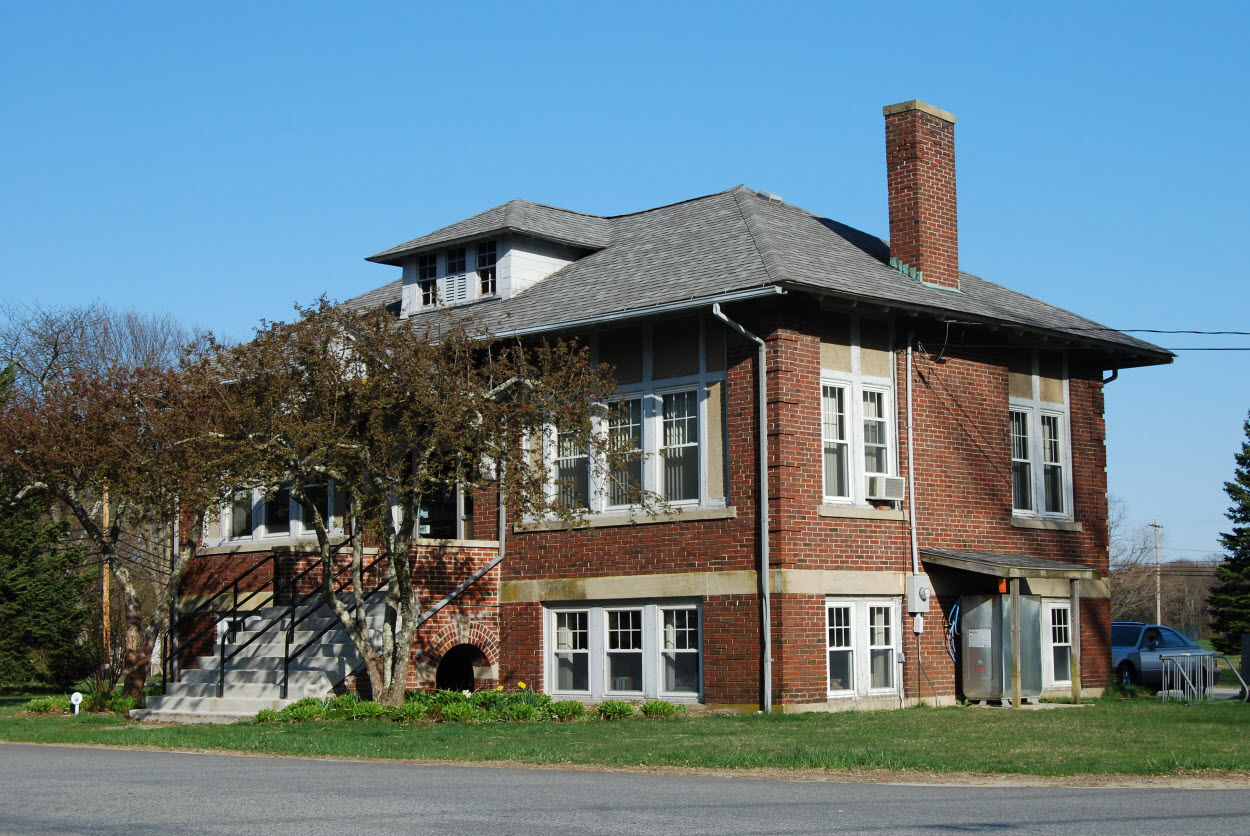
Berkley Public Library

=== Town government ===
Executive Branch: Three-member Board of Selectmen with three-year staggered terms.

Jennifer Vincent: Chairman

Tabitha McCrohan: Member

Town Administrator: Matthew Chabot

Legislative Branch: Open Town Meeting.

=== State government ===
Representative in General Court

- Norman Orrall (R-Lakeville), 12th Bristol District

Senator in General Court

- Marc Pacheco (D-Taunton), 1st Plymouth and Bristol District

Governor's Councillor

- Joseph C. Ferreira (D-Somerset), 1st District

=== Federal government ===
Representative to the United States House of Representatives

- Jake Auchincloss (D-Newton) (4th Massachusetts District)

Senators in the United States Senate

- Ed Markey (D)
- Elizabeth Warren (D)

Berkley presidential election results
Year	Democratic	Republican	Third parties	Total Votes	Margin
2024	38.12% 1,612	60.27% 2,549	1.61% 68	4,229	22.15%
2020	42.89% 1,764	54.73% 2,251	2.38% 98	4,113	11.84%
2016	40.63% 1,455	53.78% 1,926	5.59% 200	3,581	13.15%
2012	47.38% 1,573	50.87% 1,689	1.75% 58	3,320	3.49%
2008	48.80% 1,585	47.97% 1,558	3.23% 105	3,248	0.83%
2004	52.34% 1,543	46.03% 1,357	1.63% 48	2,948	6.31%
2000	53.21% 1,300	39.71% 970	7.08% 173	2,443	13.51%
1996	53.24% 1,223	28.56% 656	18.20% 418	2,297	24.68%
1992	35.59% 746	25.29% 530	39.12% 820	2,096	3.53%
1988	41.82% 662	56.54% 895	1.64% 26	1,583	14.72%
1984	35.91% 423	63.41% 747	0.68% 8	1,178	27.50%
1980	35.86% 388	49.17% 532	14.97% 162	1,082	13.31%
1976	56.13% 549	41.21% 403	2.66% 26	978	14.93%
1972	47.23% 375	52.02% 413	0.76% 6	794	4.79%
1968	45.03% 335	50.54% 376	4.44% 33	744	5.51%
1964	65.09% 468	34.49% 248	0.42% 3	719	30.60%
1960	40.56% 303	58.77% 439	0.67% 5	747	18.21%
1956	31.23% 198	68.45% 434	0.32% 2	634	37.22%
1952	35.12% 223	64.09% 407	0.79% 5	635	28.98%
1948	46.50% 239	52.92% 272	0.58% 3	514	6.42%
1944	40.88% 177	58.89% 255	0.23% 1	433	18.01%
1940	43.20% 200	56.59% 262	0.22% 1	463	13.39%

== Education ==
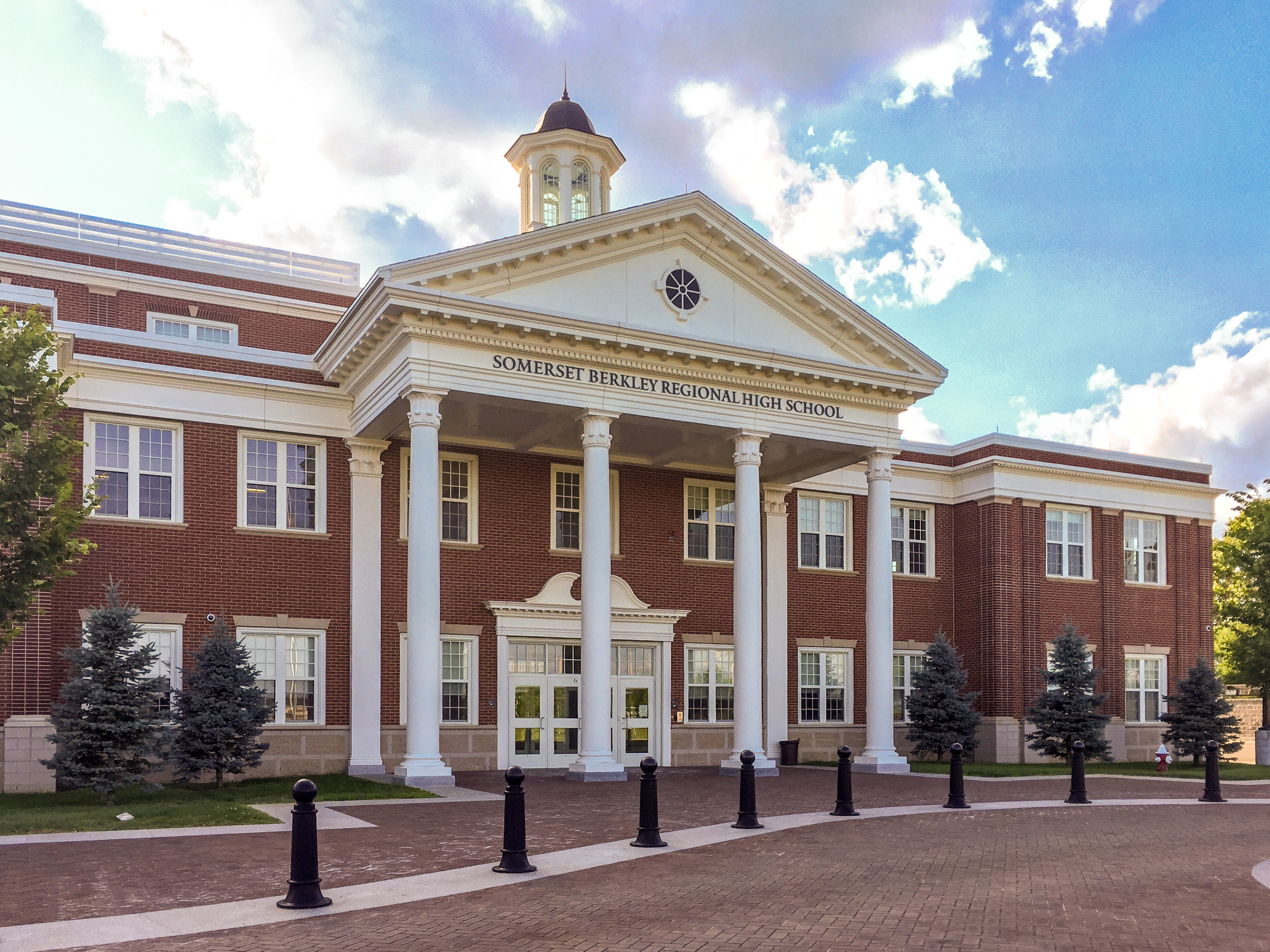
Somerset Berkley Regional High School

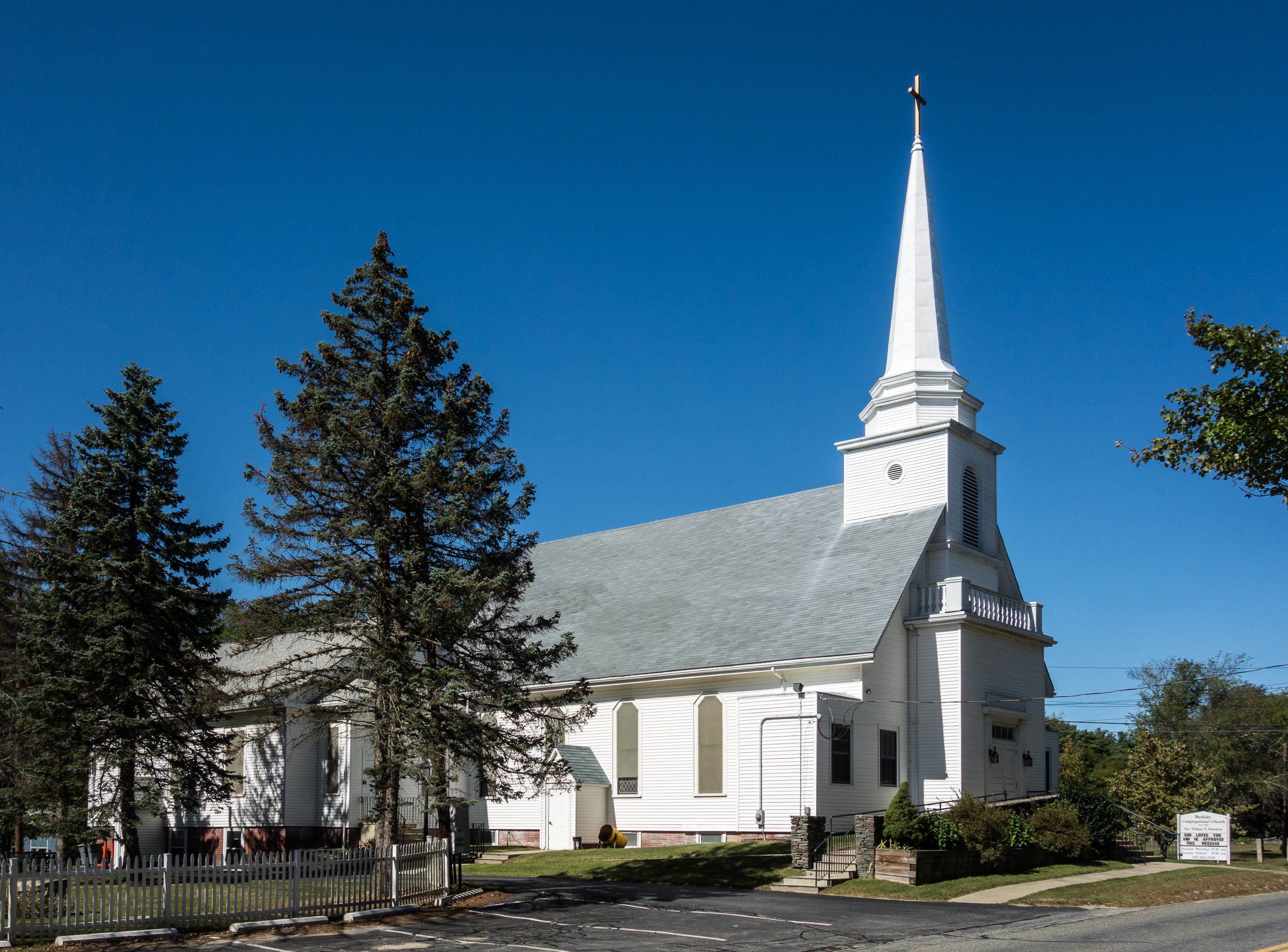
Berkley Congregational Church

- Berkley Community School – Grades Pre-K through 4 : South Main Street, Berkley, MA
- Berkley Middle School – Grades 5 through 8 : North Main Street, Berkley, MA
- Somerset Berkley Regional High School – Grades 9 through 12 : 625 County Street, Somerset, MA (beginning in Fall 2011)

High school students may also attend Bristol County Agricultural High School in Dighton, Bristol-Plymouth Regional Technical School in Taunton, or local private and parochial schools; the closest Catholic high school is Bishop Connolly High School in Fall River.

== Local attractions ==
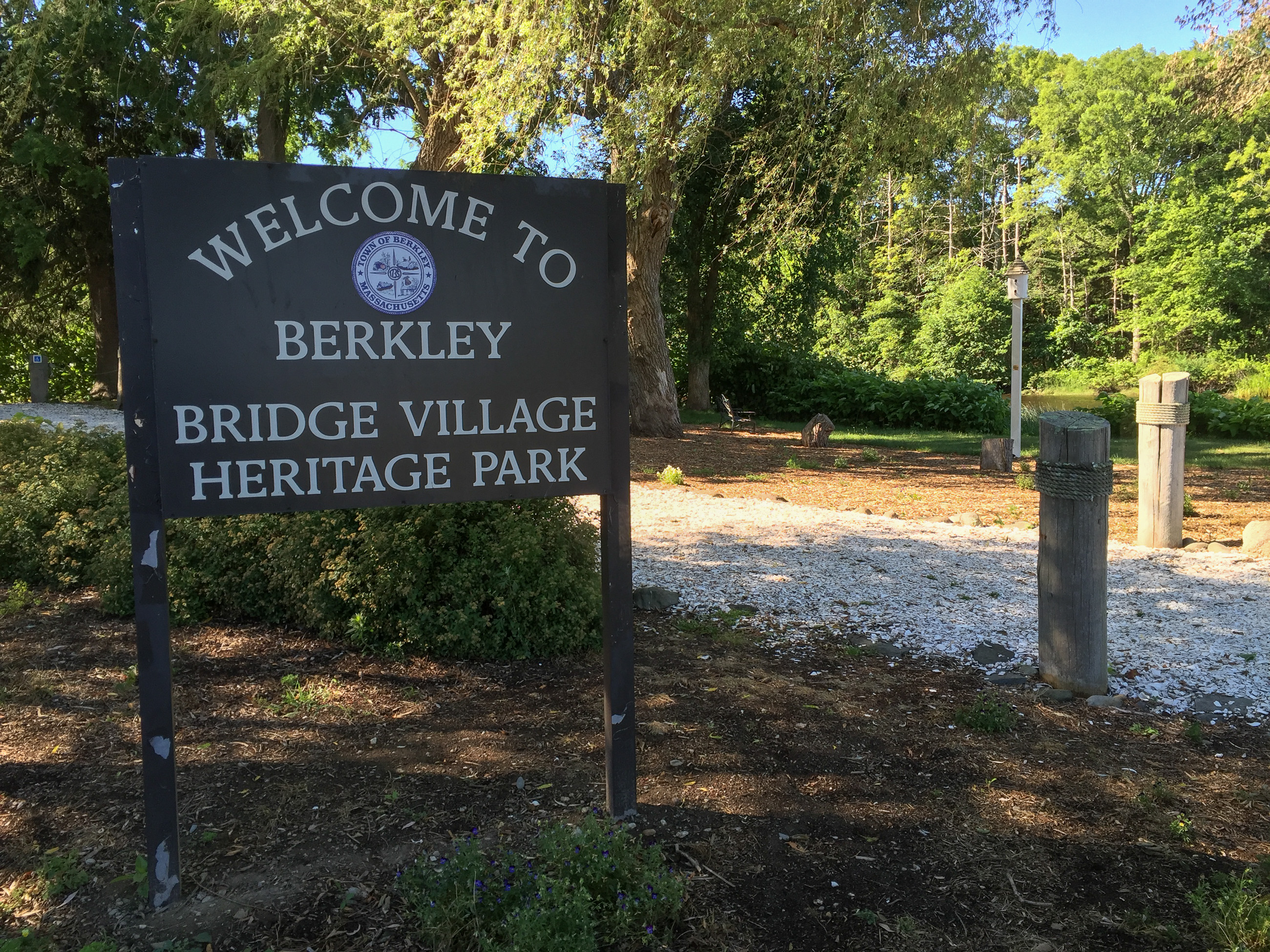
Berkley Bridge Village Heritage Park

The Bridge Village Heritage Park at 70 Elm Street is a tiny park at the foot of the Berkley-Dighton Bridge on the Taunton River. It is a spot for fishing, picknicking, and putting in a canoe or kayak. Opened in October 2006, this .5-acre (2,000 m^{2}) area is aimed at canoeing and kayaking. Motor boats and boats in tow are prohibited.

Dighton Rock State Park is a park that holds the Dighton Rock, a boulder with petroglyphs of uncertain age and authorship, in a museum on an 85-acre (340,000 m^{2}) site on the Taunton River. Trails and a stage for theatre productions highlight the park.

Berkley Congregational Church was established just two years after the town's founding in 1735. Located at 13 South Main Street, the church has offered continuous religious services since its inception.

== Notable people ==
- Thomas Andros, minister at Berkley for 46 years
- C. G. W. French, jurist and politician, was born in Berkley
- Tony Gaffney, former professional basketball player, lives in Berkley and was born in Berkley.

== See also ==
- Dighton Rock
- Greater Taunton Area
- Taunton River Watershed
