= Ole Worm =

Danish scientist (1588–1654)

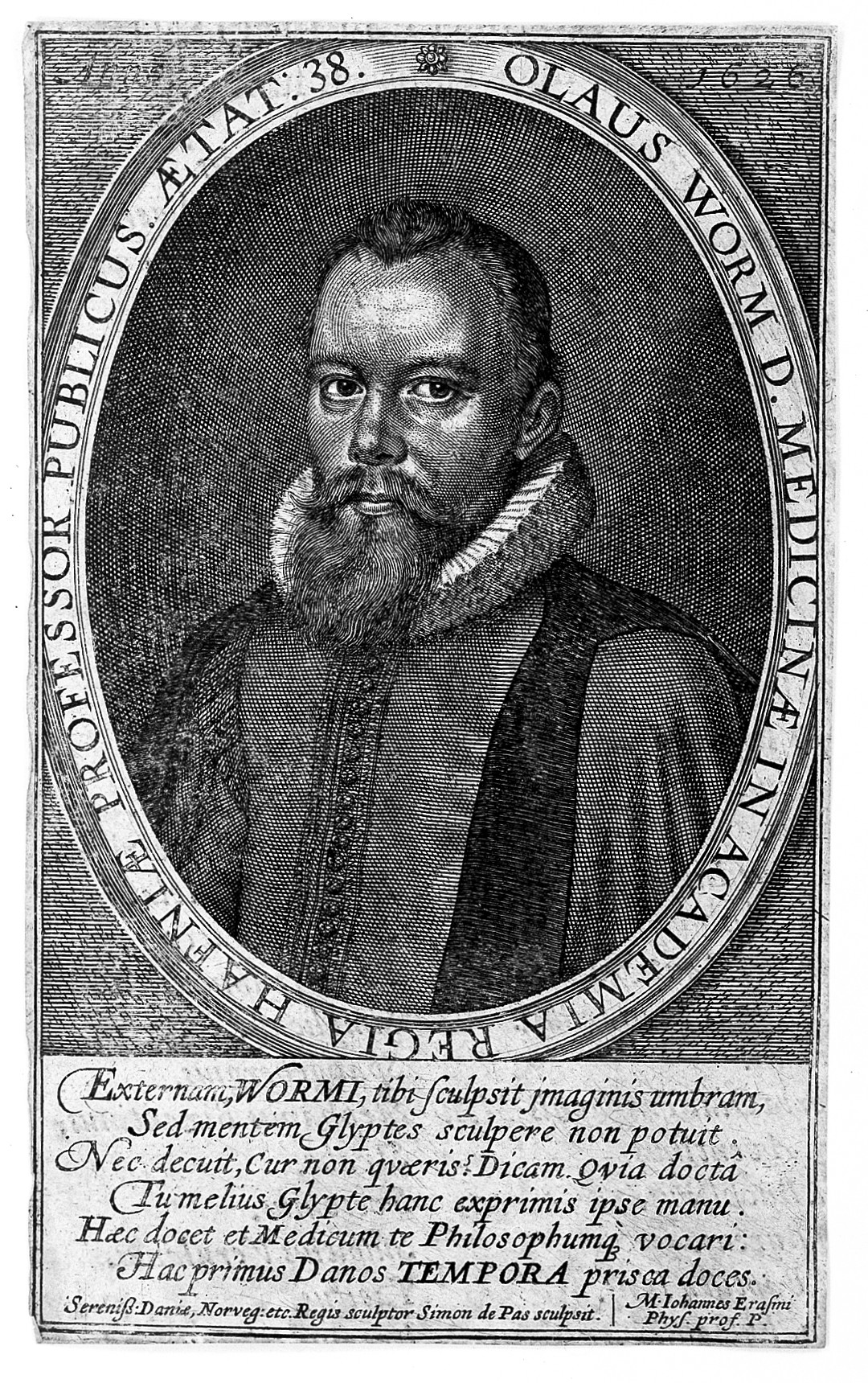
- Born: 13 May 1588; Aarhus, Denmark
- Died: 31 August 1654 (aged 66); Copenhagen, Denmark
- Other name: Olaus Wormius
- Education: University of Basel, University of Marburg, University of Copenhagen, Aarhus Katedralskole.
- Occupations: physician, natural historian and antiquary
- Spouse: Dorothea Fincke
- Children: Willum Worm
- Family: Christen Worm (grandson)

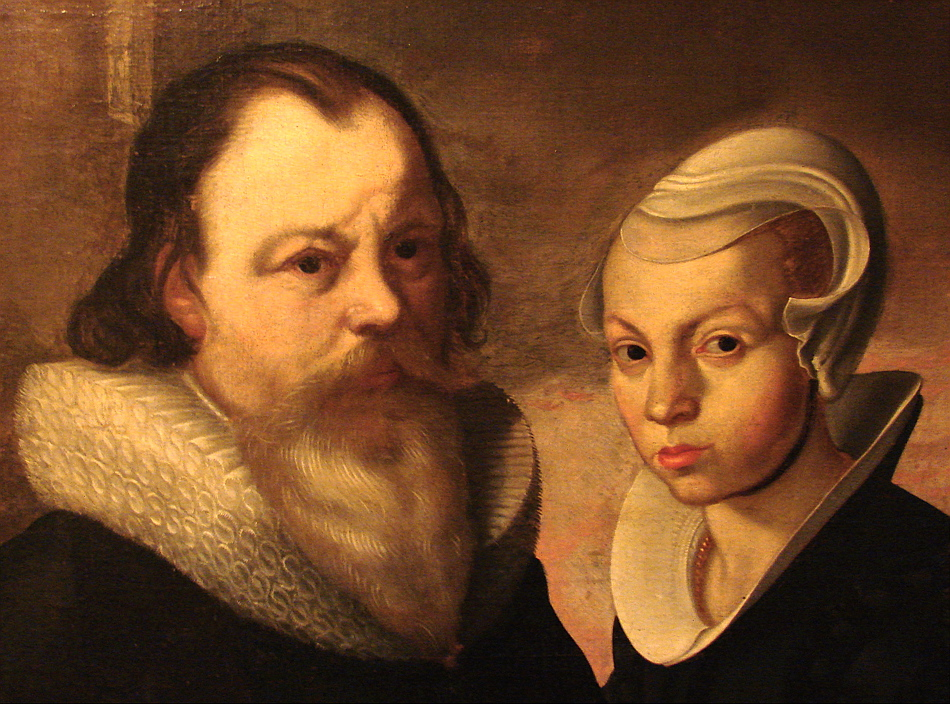
Ole Worm and Dorothea Worm, née Fincke

Ole Worm (13 May 1588 – 31 August 1654), who often went by the Latinized form of his name Olaus Wormius, was a Danish physician, natural historian and antiquary. He was a professor at the University of Copenhagen where he taught Greek, Latin, physics and medicine.

== Biography ==
Ole Worm was born on 13 May 1588 in Aarhus, Denmark, into a prosperous family. Worm was the son of Willum Worm, who served as the mayor of Aarhus, and was made a rich man by an inheritance from his father. Ole Worm's grandfather Johan Worm, a magistrate in Aarhus, was a Lutheran who had fled from Arnhem in Gelderland while it was under Catholic rule.

After attending the grammar school in Aarhus, Worm entered the University of Marburg in 1605, at about 17, where he began his studies in theology. He later pursued medicine, earning his doctorate at the University of Basel in 1611, in his early twenties. By 1617, he had returned to Copenhagen to take a Master of Arts degree at the University of Copenhagen, where he would spend the rest of his career.

Worm married Dorothea Fincke, the daughter of the mathematician and physicist Thomas Fincke, who invented the terms 'tangent' and 'secant' and taught at the University of Copenhagen for more than 60 years. Through this marriage, Worm became connected to the Bartholin family, a prominent dynasty of physicians and scholars who played a central role in the intellectual life of the University of Copenhagen in the 17th and 18th centuries.

He was a professor at the University of Copenhagen where he taught Latin, Greek, physics, and medicine.

He was personal physician to King Christian IV of Denmark. Somewhat remarkable for a physician of the time, he remained in the city of Copenhagen to minister to the sick during an epidemic of the bubonic plague, which led to his own death from the plague in 1654.

== Scientific and cultural significance ==
In medicine, Worm's chief contributions were in embryology. The Wormian bones (small bones that fill gaps in the cranial sutures) are named after him.

Worm is known to have been a collector of early literature in the Scandinavian languages. He also wrote a number of treatises on runestones and collected texts that were written in runic. Worm received letters of introduction to the bishops of Denmark and Norway from the King of Denmark-Norway due to the king's interest and approval.

In 1626 Worm published his "Danish Chronology" (Fasti Danici) containing the results of his researches into runic lore; and in 1636 his "Runes: the oldest Danish literature" (Runir seu Danica literatura antiquissima), a compilation of transcribed runic texts. In 1643 his "Danish Monuments" (Danicorum Monumentorum) was published. The first written study of runestones, it is also one of the only surviving sources for depictions of numerous runestones and inscriptions from Denmark, some of which are now lost. An illustration of his pet bird, a great auk, survives as the only known illustration of a live member of the species, which is now extinct.

As a scientist, Worm straddled the line between modern and pre-modern. As an example, in a very modern, empirical mode, Worm determined in 1638 that the unicorn did not exist and that purported unicorn horns simply were from the narwhal. At the same time, however, he then wondered if the anti-poison properties associated with a unicorn's horn still held true, and undertook experiments in poisoning pets and then serving them ground up narwhal horn (his poisoning must have been relatively mild because he reported that they did recover).

Other empirical investigations he conducted included providing convincing evidence that lemmings were rodents and not, as some thought, spontaneously generated by the air, and also by providing the first detailed drawing of a bird-of-paradise proving that they did, despite much popular speculation to the opposite, indeed have feet like regular birds. Worm's primary use of his natural history collection was for the purpose of pedagogy.

== Museum Wormianum ==
As a natural philosopher, Worm assembled a great collection of curiosities, which ranged from native artifacts collected from the New World, to taxidermed animals, to fossils, on which he speculated greatly. Museum Wormianum was the cabinet of rarities of the natural history cabinet established by Ole Worm in Copenhagen. It consists of minerals, plants, animals, and man-made objects.

Worm compiled engravings of his collection, along with his speculations about their meaning, into a catalog of his Museum Wormianum, published after his death in 1654. Museum Wormianum contained a detailed description of the natural history cabinet. The text is divided into four books; the first three dealing with minerals, plant and animal. The fourth detailed archaeological and ethnographic items.

== In popular culture ==
The early twentieth century horror author H. P. Lovecraft mentions Olaus Wormius as having translated the fictional Al Azif (commonly known as the Necronomicon) from Greek to Latin; however, he dates this translation 1228, four centuries before the historical Wormius's lifetime. Horror writer Anders Fager has elaborated this myth in several of his tales. Ole Worm appears in one of the Icelandic Sjón's novels From the Mouth of the Whale.

== Gallery ==
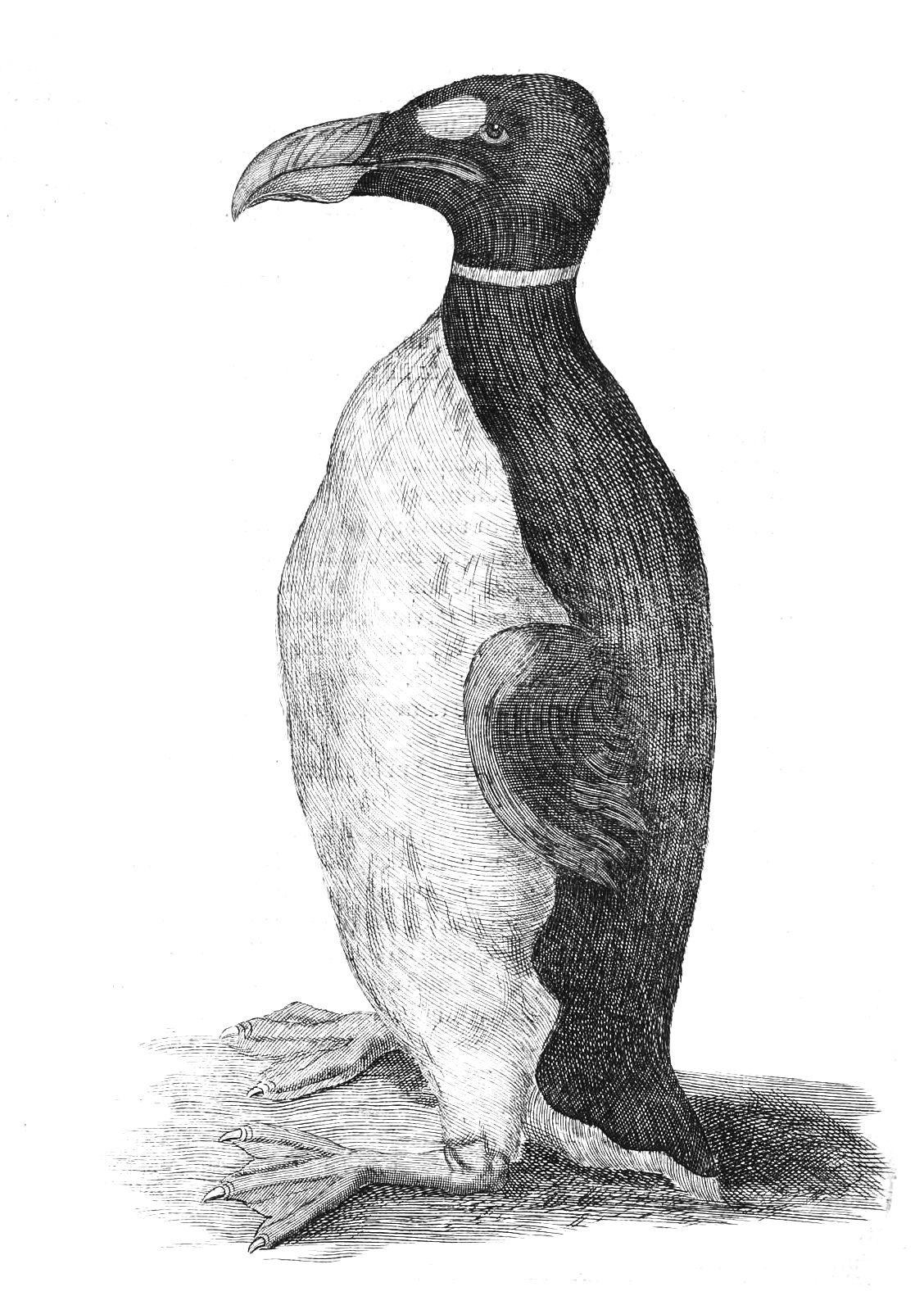
Only known illustration of a great auk drawn from life

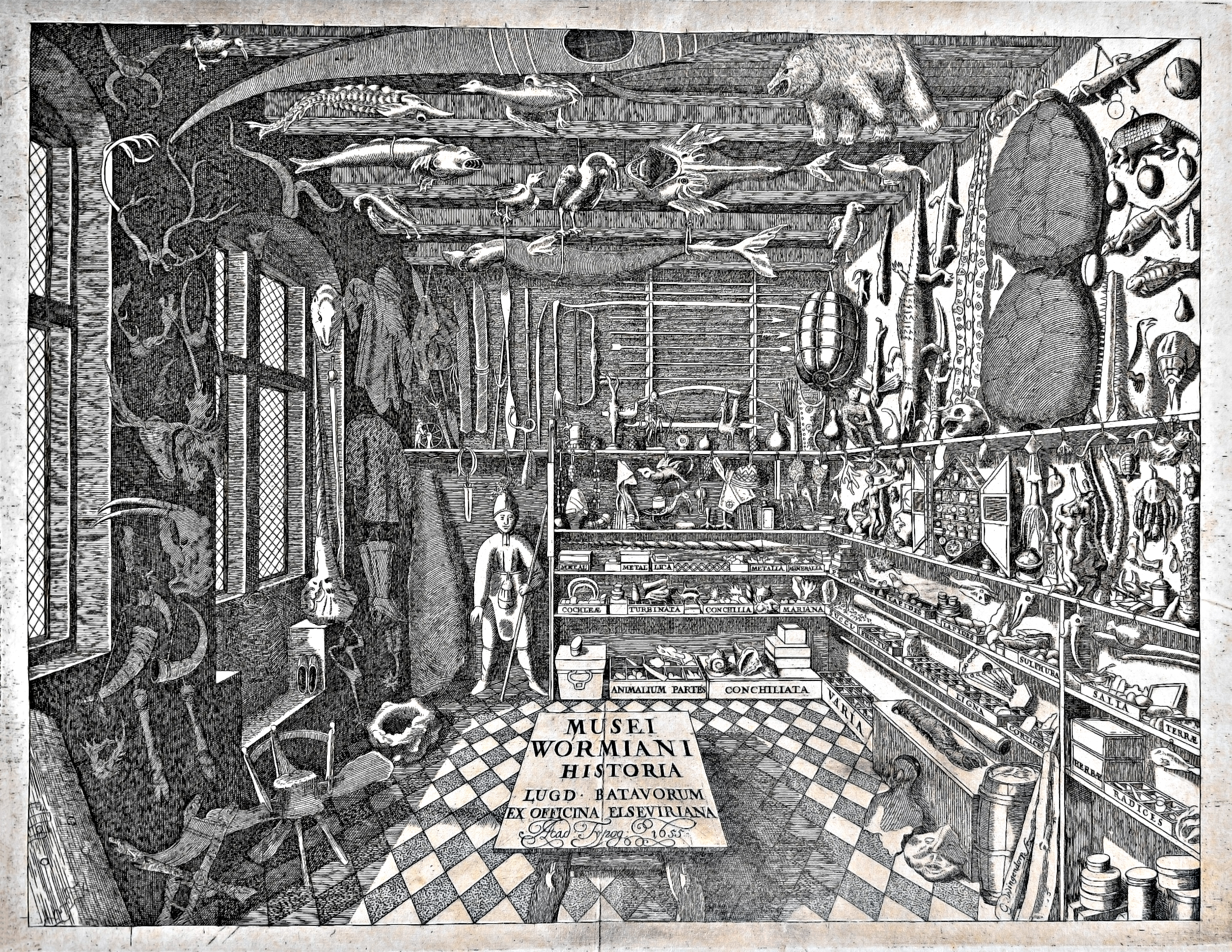
"Musei Wormiani Historia", the frontispiece from the Museum Wormianum depicting Wormius' cabinet of curiosities

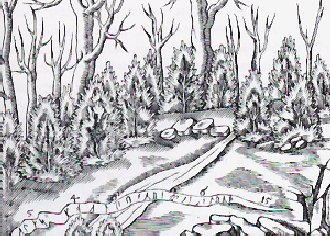
Worm's illustration of the Runamo inscription, wherein he asserted he could read the name Lund; the "inscription" later was found to be natural formations in the rock

== See also ==
- Curiosity Cabinet of Ole Worm

== Bibliography ==
- Fasti Danici.: universam tempora computandi rationem antiqvitus in Dania et vicinis regionibus observatam libris tribus exhibentes (in Latin), 1633
- Danicorum monumentorum libri sex: e spissis antiquitatum tenebris et in Dania ac Norvegia extantibus ruderibus (in Latin), 1643
- Runir seu, Danica literatura antiqvissima (in Latin), 1651, alt. source
