= Berkley Common Historic District =

Historic district in Massachusetts, United States

- U.S. National Register of Historic Places
- U.S. Historic district
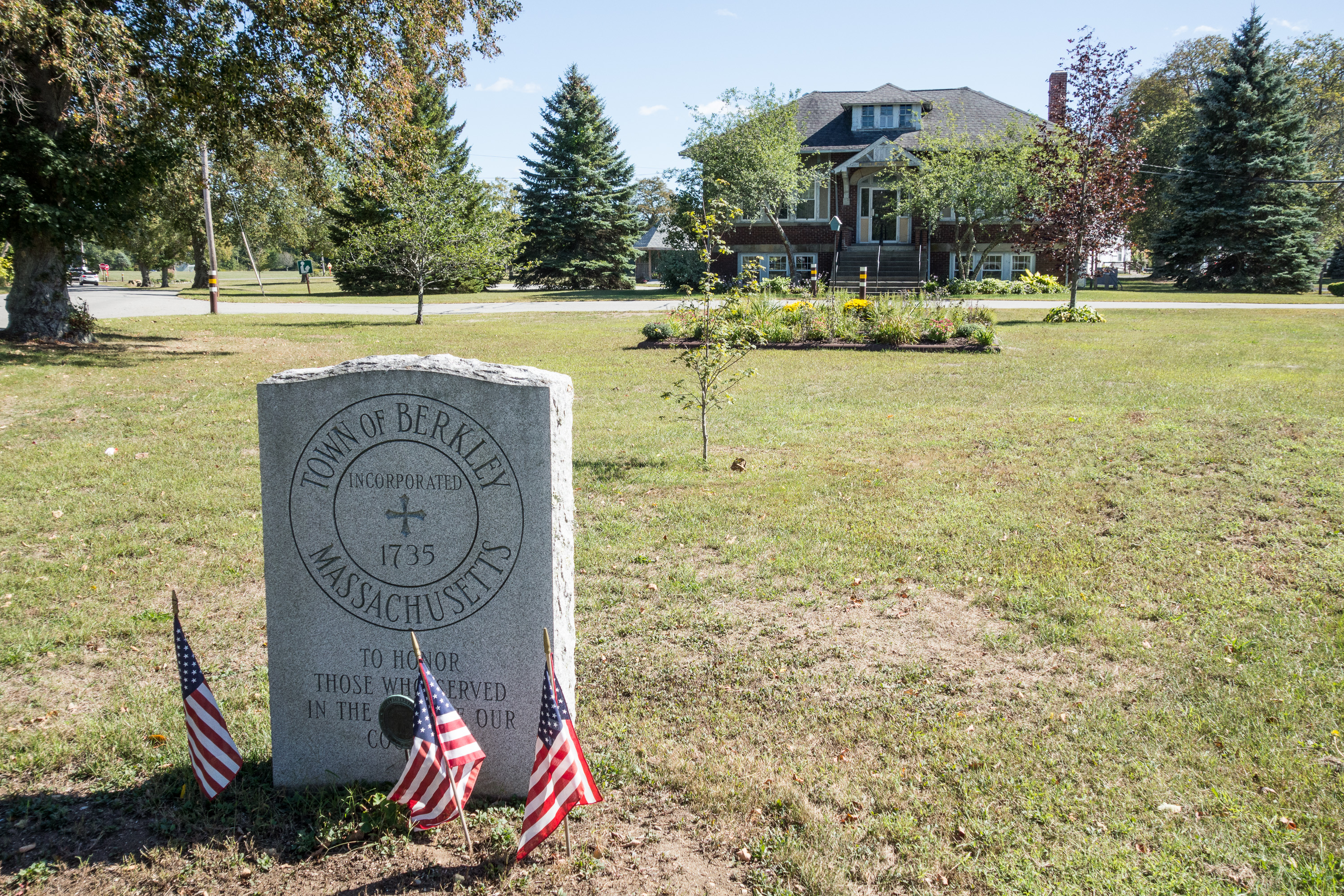
- Granite marker for Berkley Common. Berkley public library in background.

- Location within Massachusetts Location within the United States
- Location: N. Main, S. Main, Porter & Locust Sts., Berkley, Massachusetts
- Coordinates: 41°50′46″N 71°4′55″W
- NRHP reference No.: 15000980
- Added to NRHP: January 19, 2016

The Berkley Common Historic District is a historic district encompassing the historic heart of Berkley, Massachusetts. The town's village center is located near its geographic center, roughly midway between Massachusetts Route 24 and the Taunton River. Its central focus is the triangular town common, bounded by Main, Locust, and Porter Streets. The common is flanked by a number municipal and civic buildings, and has been the town's focus of civic life for more about 275 years.

The district was added to the National Register of Historic Places in 2016.

== Gallery ==
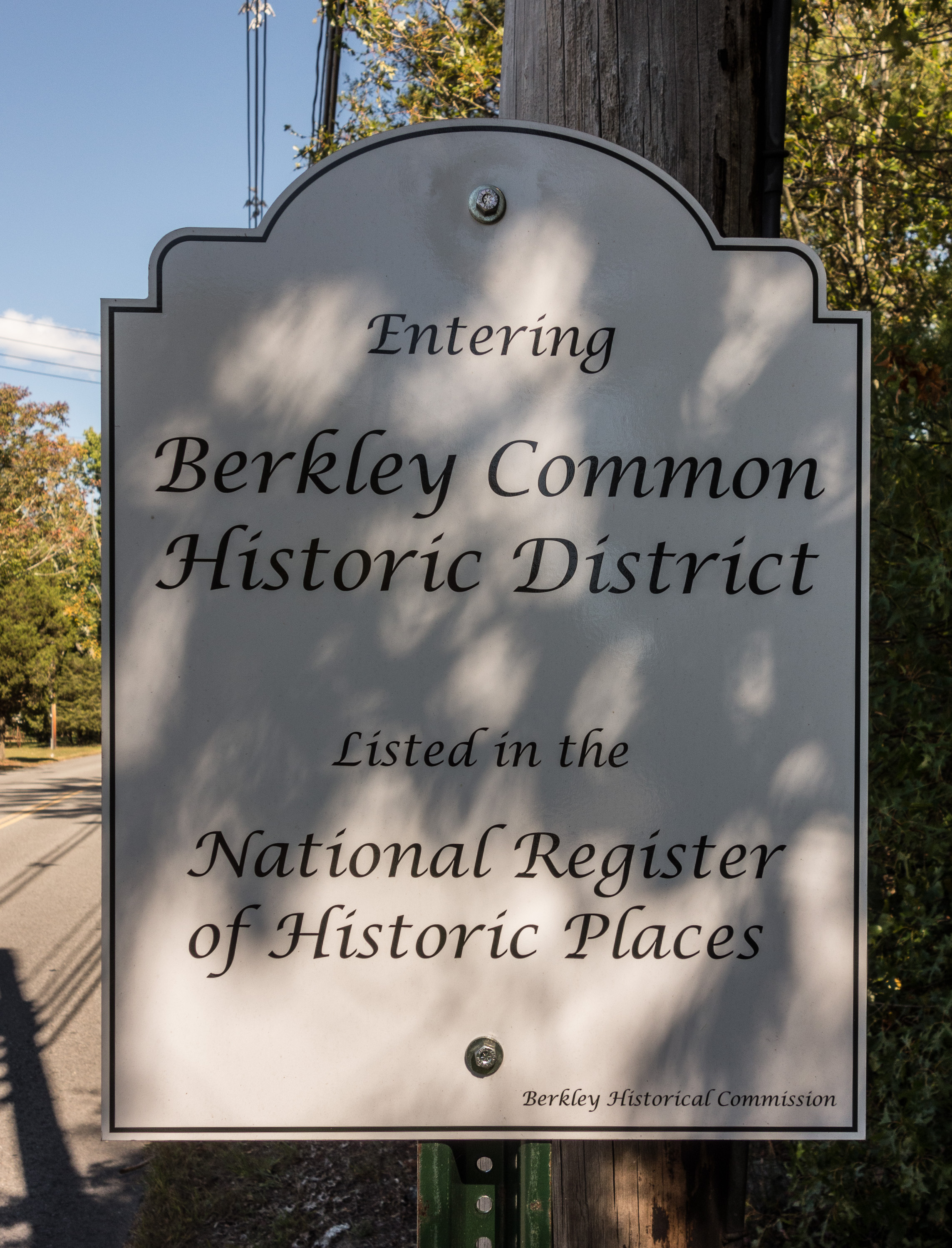
Sign for the Berkley Common Historic District

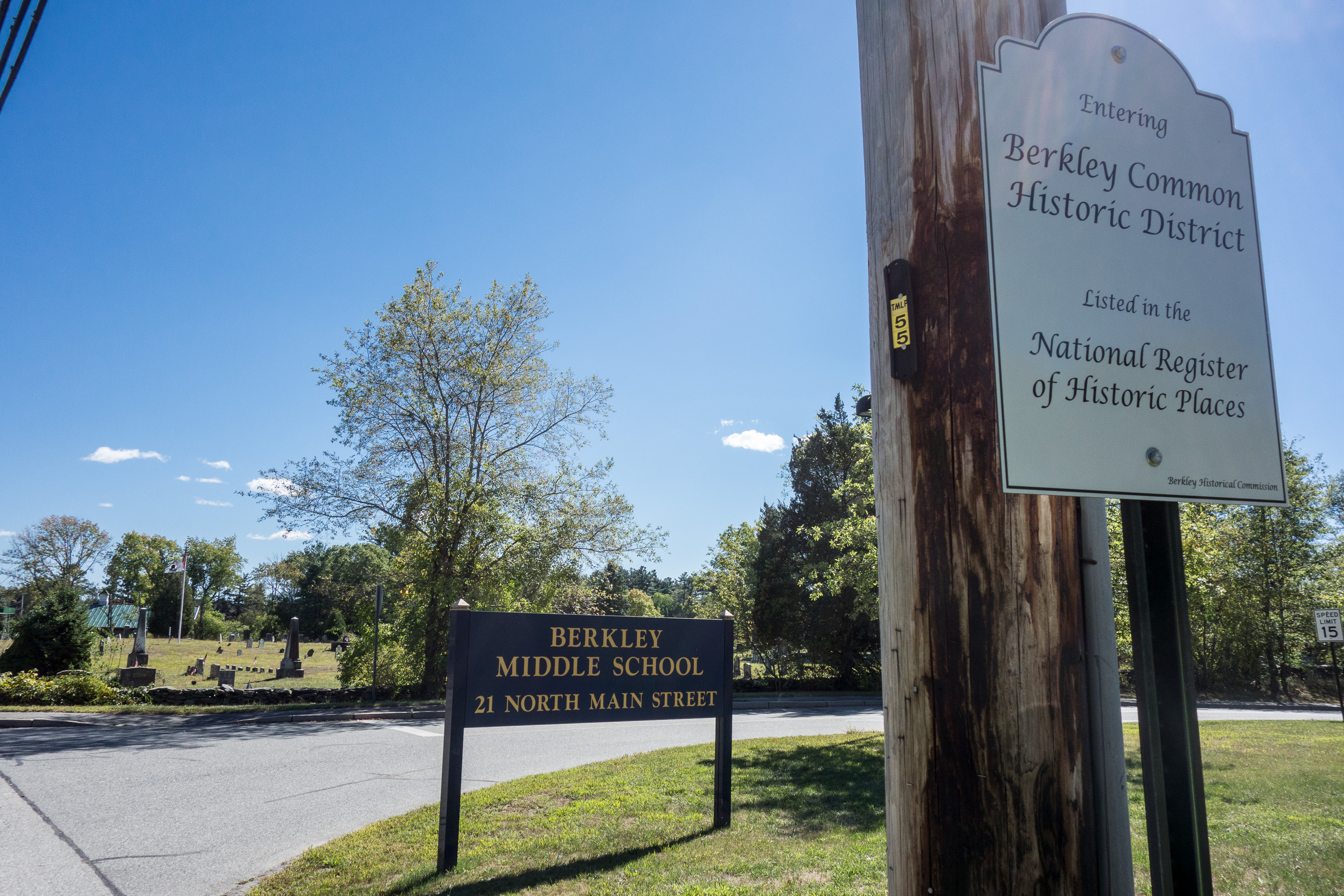
Another sign, this one in front of the Middle School and cemetery

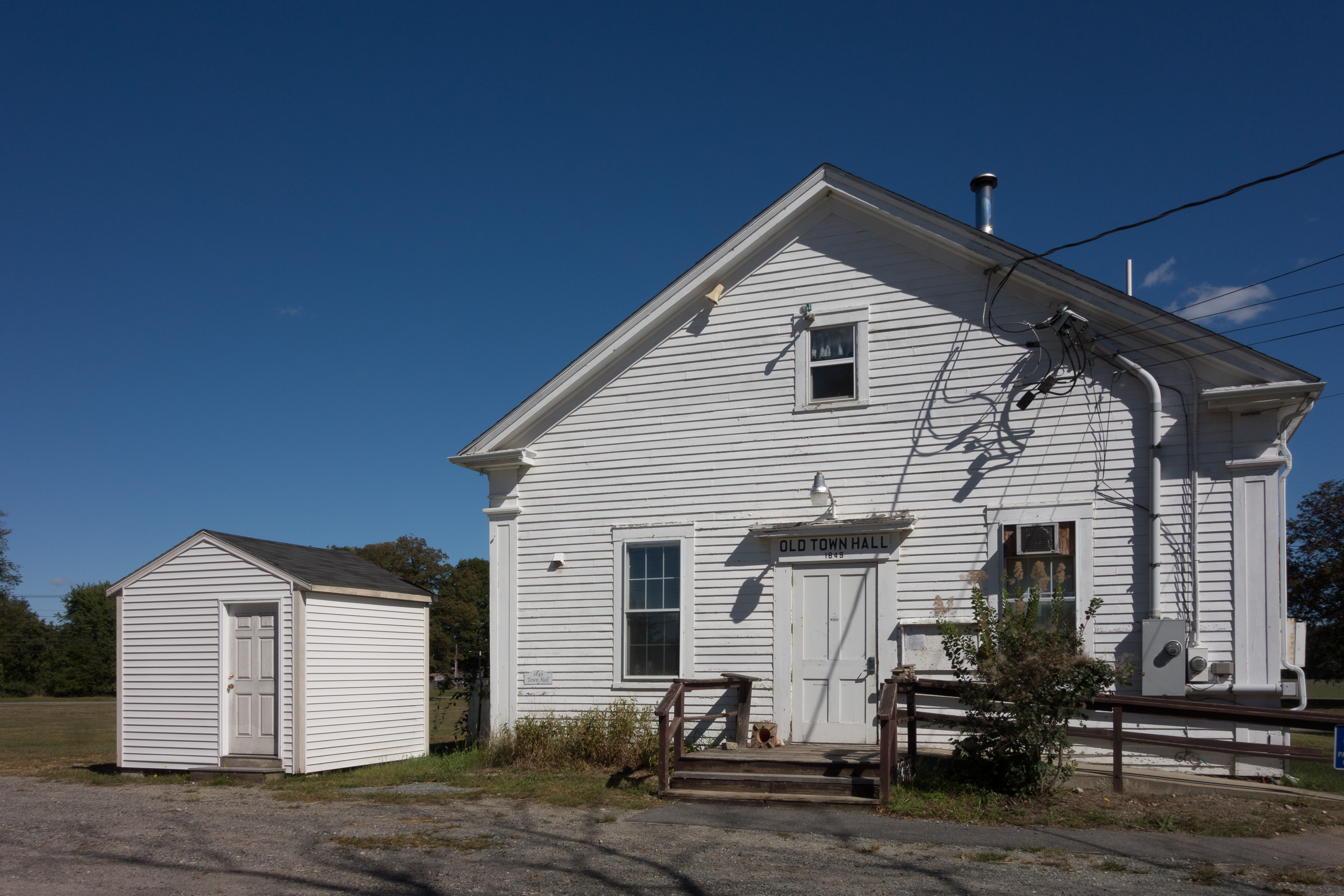
Old Town Hall

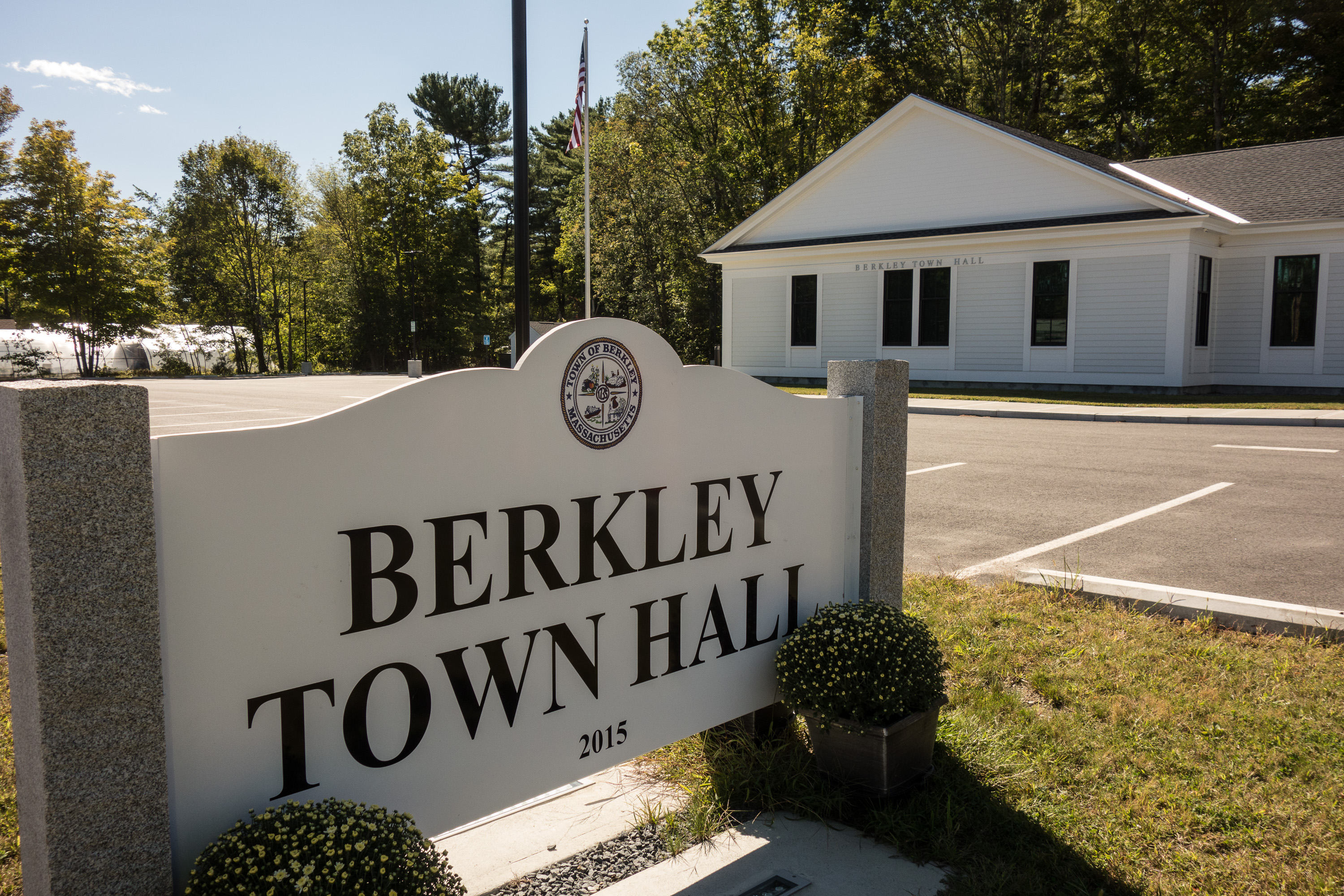
New Town Hall

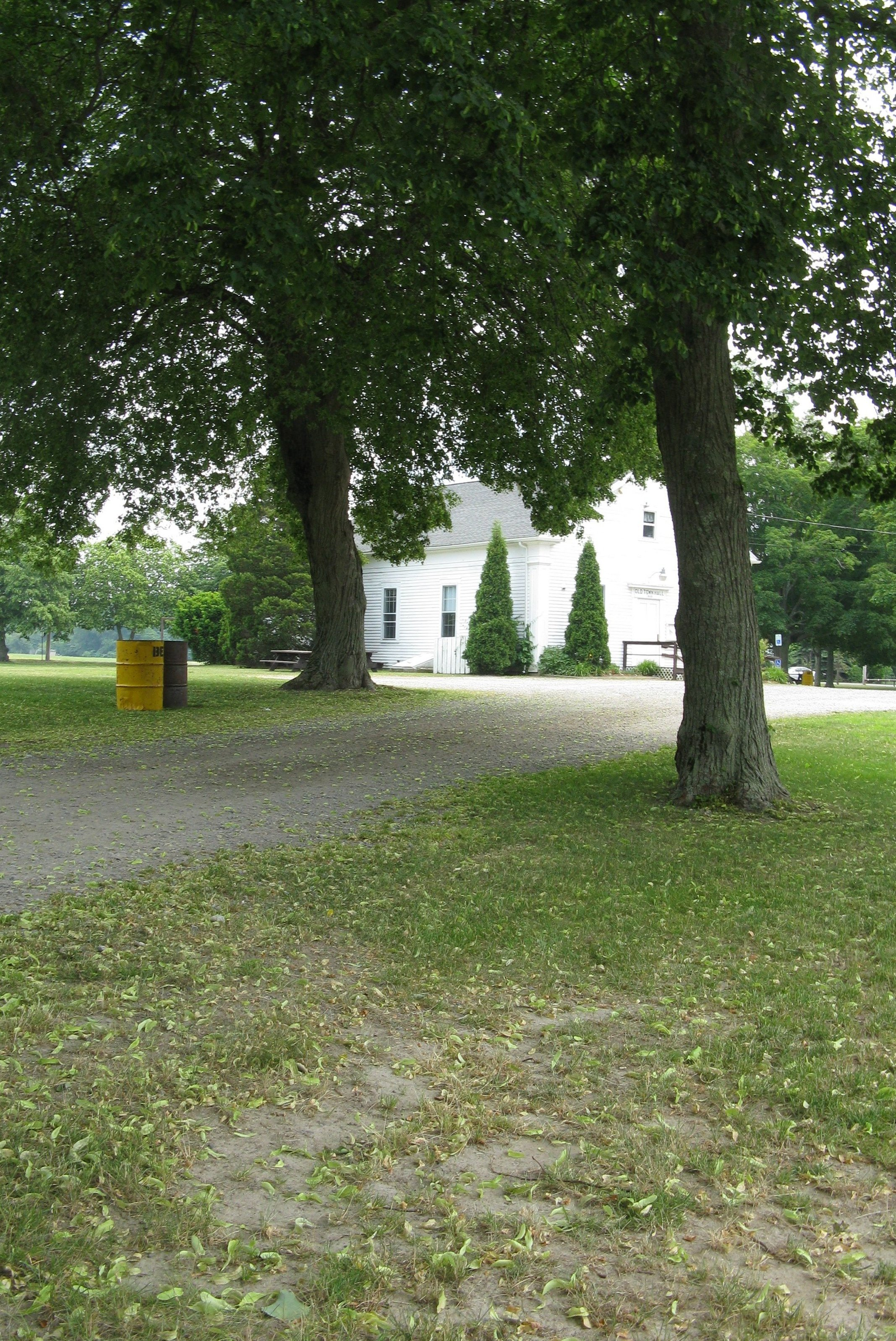
Berkley Common, church in the background

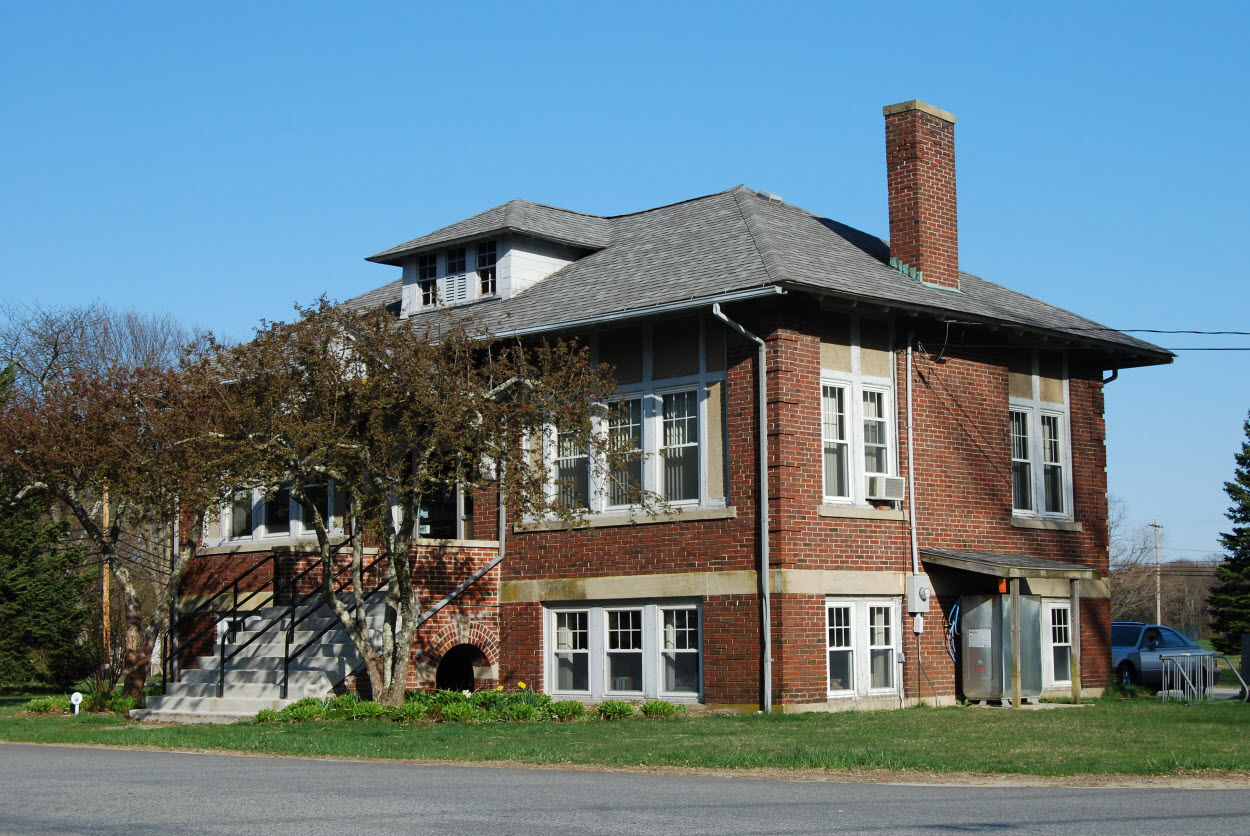
The library

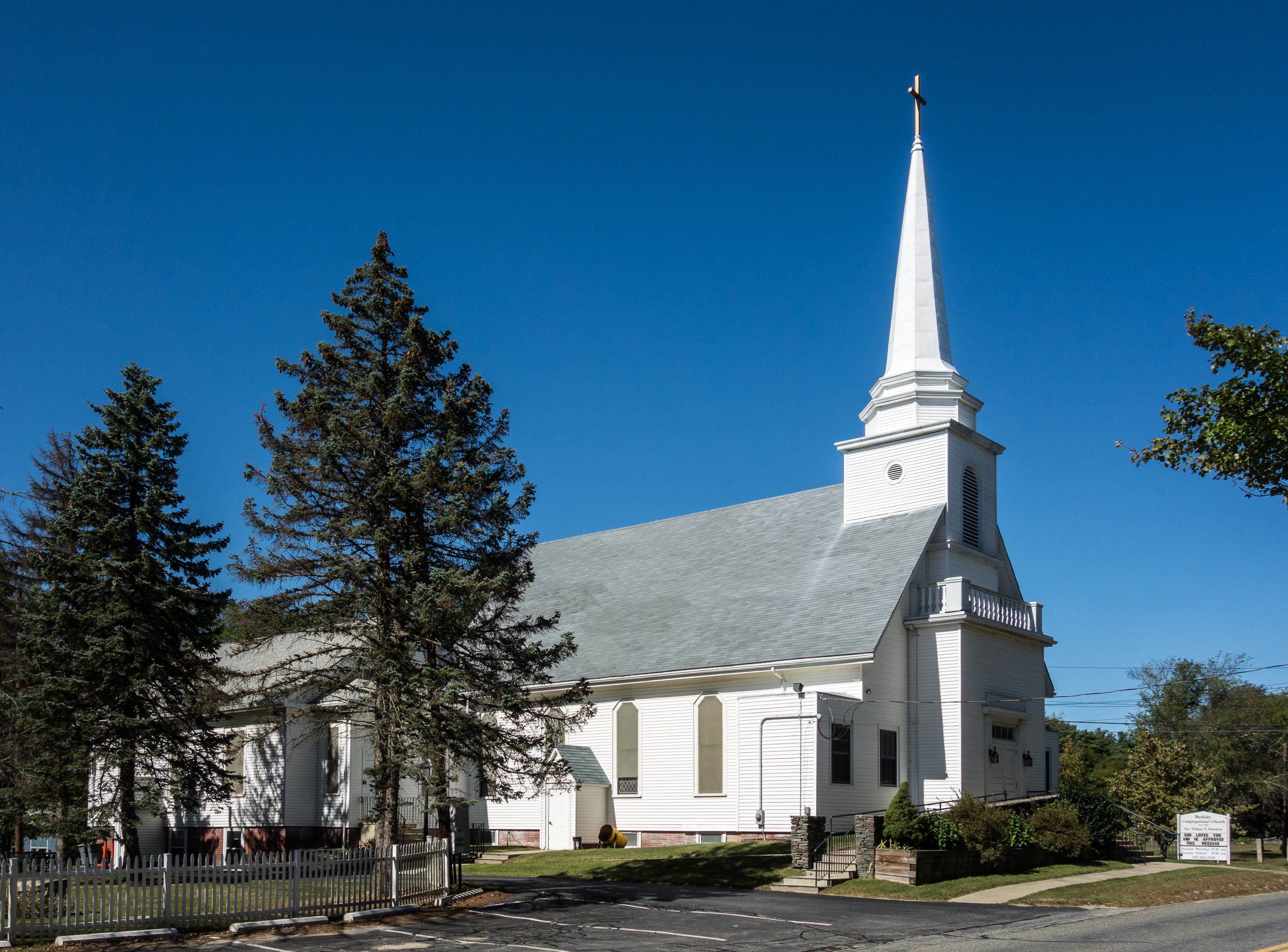
Berkley Congregational Church

== See also ==
- National Register of Historic Places listings in Bristol County, Massachusetts
