= Thomas Andros =

American clergyman (1759–1845)

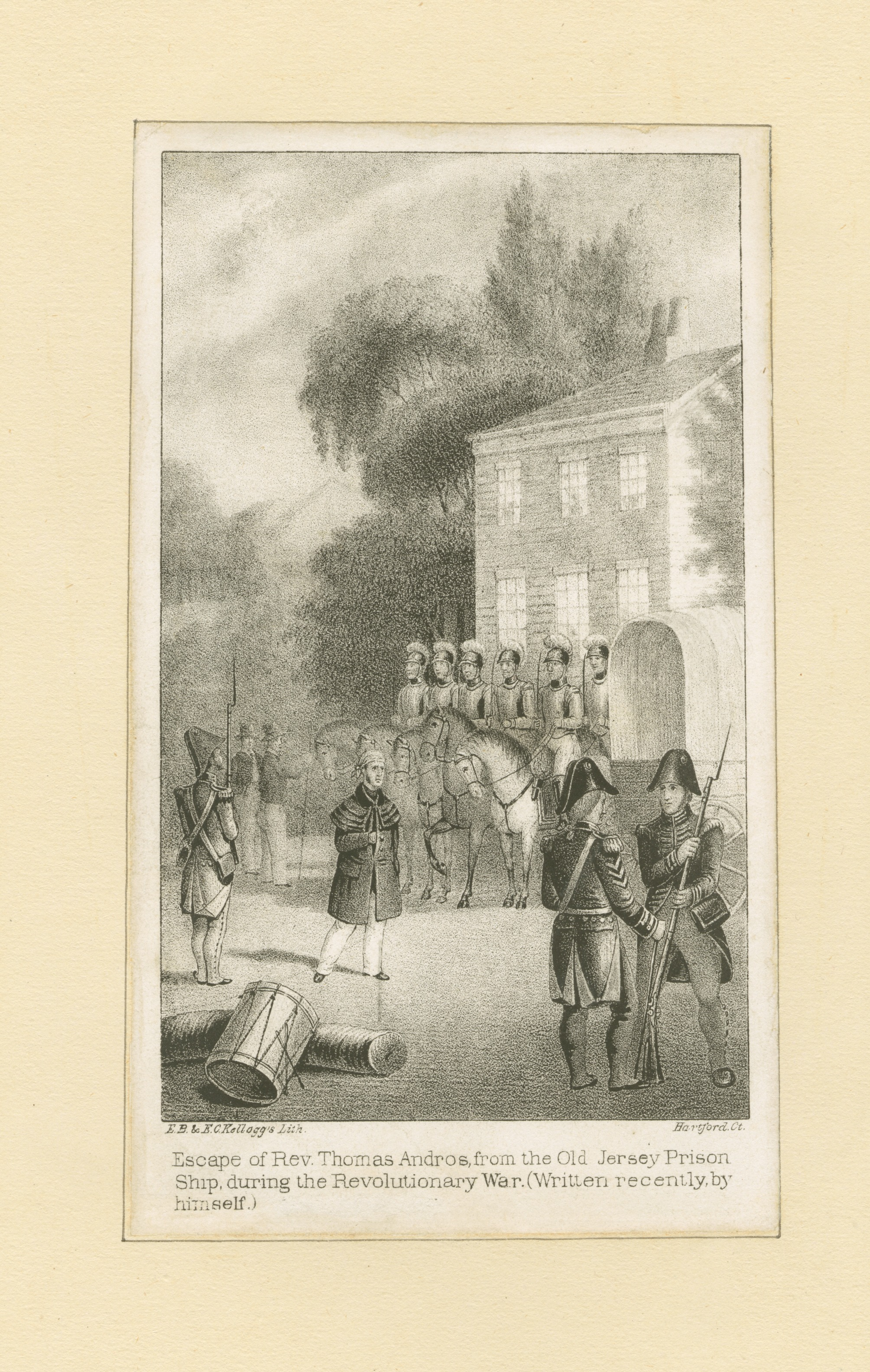
Escape of Rev. Thomas Andros, from the old Jersey prison ship, during the Revolutionary War

Tomas Andros (1 May 1759 Norwich, Connecticut – 30 December 1845 Berkley, Massachusetts) was an American clergyman.

He joined the revolutionary army at the age of 16, and fought in the battles of Long Island and White Plains. In 1781 he enlisted on a privateer in New London, but was captured and confined in the Jersey prison-ship in New York. A few months later he escaped, and on the restoration of his health studied theology with Benedict in Plainfield, Connecticut.

He was ordained at Berkley in 1788, and for 46 years remained in charge of the church at this place. He published sermons, and also a narrative of his imprisonment and escape from the Jersey prison-ship. An account of his life, prepared by his son, is given in Emery's "Ministry of Taunton."

His son, R. S. S. Andros, was born in Berkley, Massachusetts, and died there in August 1868. He edited several newspapers, was deputy collector in Boston for some years, and subsequently, as special agent of the treasury department, was engaged in reorganizing custom-houses in the South. He was the author of the "Customs Guide," a codification of the revenue laws, contributed poems to the " Democratic Review," and published "Chocorua and other Sketches" (1838).
