= Curiosity Cabinet of Ole Worm =

1655 engraving by G. Wingendorp

Museum Wormianum (frontispiece)
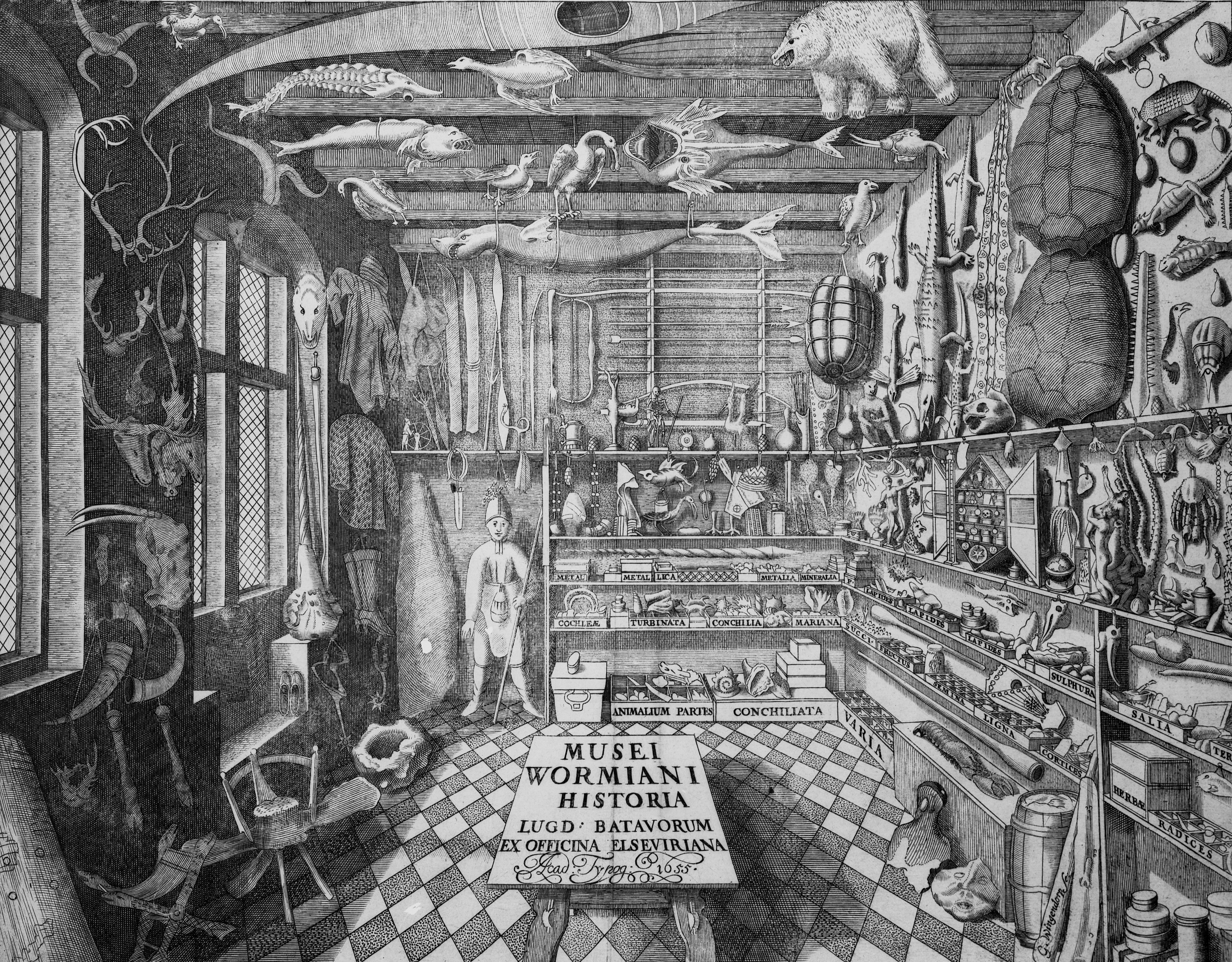
- Frontispiece to Museum Wormianum (Leiden: Isaac Elzevier, 1655), depicting the curiosity cabinet of Olaus Worm
- Artist: G. Wingendorp
- Year: 1655
- Medium: Engraving on paper
- Dimensions: 27.8 cm × 35.8 cm (10.9 in × 14.1 in)

The frontispiece to Museum Wormianum is a 1655 engraving by G. Wingendorp, produced for the catalogue of the collection assembled by the Danish physician and antiquarian Olaus Worm. Published in Leiden by Isaac Elzevier shortly after Worm's death in 1654, the engraving is based on a drawing supplied by Worm. The image depicts the interior of his curiosity cabinet in Copenhagen showing a densely arranged room containing natural specimens and human-made objects, including animals, shells, minerals, and artifacts, presented as part of the collection documented in the volume.

== Description ==
At the bottom center of this frontispiece is a tablet containing the title and publication information for the volume printed on shells and bones. The title is situated within a room containing curiosities collected by Ole Worm in Copenhagen. The room includes items such as taxidermy, weapons, and unlabeled barrels. The assortment of the items in the piece points to the works title- Ole Worm's Cabinet of Wonder: Natural Specimens and Wondrous Monsters, as they are mostly natural specimens. This print displays a method of scientific inquiry called 'proto-empiricism', a type of study of specific items grounded in sensory experience. Items in the collection are objects of scientific inquiry that allow viewers to dive deeper into the wonder and mystery of the cabinet through said proto-empiricism. The human-like figure in the center right of the image is a humanoid automaton, a mechanical imitation of a human. When it was operated by a hidden wheel, it could move around the room in a circle and pick up objects. The figure is dressed in what was thought to be Native gear, possibly Inuit, and appears to be holding what could be a spear. This piece contains objects that can be divided into four categories: minerals, plants, animals and artificialia (man-made objects). The categories go in ascending order from "lowest" form of life, minerals, to "highest" form of life, animals, with the fourth category, artificialia, existing outside that context of the three kingdoms of nature. This division of categories gives visual order to the art work.

== Publication ==
The engraving was produced as the frontispiece to Museum Wormianum, a catalogue of the collection assembled by Olaus Worm. The book was published in Leiden in 1655 by Isaac Elzevier, shortly after Worm's death in 1654.

The catalogue documents Worm's cabinet of curiosities in Copenhagen, a collection of natural specimens and human-made objects gathered for study and display. The frontispiece engraving presents a view of this collection and shows the types and arrangement of objects within the cabinet.

Worm supplied the publisher with a drawing of his cabinet before his death, which served as the basis for the engraved frontispiece included in the published volume.

== Artist info ==
Ole Worm was born in Arhus, Denmark, in the same town where his father served as mayor. He went to school to become a physician and polymath and later went on a self termed "grand tour" of Europe where he spent much time visiting museums and collections. It is believed that this sparked his interest in art and more specifically, science as art. During this same time, Worm began collecting items that he found interesting. He formed his own collection, which he later combined with various other European collectors. Worm gathered a wide range of different types of artifacts from the natural world such as bones, rocks and minerals, and stuffed animals and birds, together with man-made artefacts and antiquities, including Roman jewellery, tools and scientific instruments. This phase of collecting is what initiated his passion that developed into his curiosity and publication: Natural Specimens and Wondrous Monsters. Worm was working during a period of enthusiasm for gathering objects that one found and forming a collection. This collection was intended to provoke both curiosity and wonder at God's creation and man's ingenuity. They would sometimes include works of virtuoso, artistry, and craftsmanship, strange natural phenomena, and rarities from around the world. It is not hard to see how the collection of items in his frontispiece invokes said curiosity and wonder. The long series of events in his life led to him becoming a professor of humanities at the University of Copenhagen, and later, professor of medicine in 1642. He also served as the personal physician to King Christian IV of Denmark. In 1644, Worm received a letter from August Buchner from Wittenberg. His eulogizing of Worm's virtue and fame describes how numerous European countries marvel at Worm and count him among those who, in addition to the pursuit of other great arts, have won immortality for themselves through the study of antiquities and the finer sciences. The final years of his life were spent teaching and tutoring in the subjects he loved, but eventually he caught the plague during the epidemic of 1654 and died in Copenhagen that same year.

== Impact of the work ==
Worm has been described as straddling the border between modern and pre-modern science. In the seventeenth century the modern, empirical approach to scientific enquiry was still being developed and Worm's periodic adoption of this approach to his studies had both social and scientific significance. He exceeded the scientific standards of his time with his collection and the ways in which he separated his findings into four distinct categories. This were some of the first steps towards the modern, empirical scientific approach. Empiricism is the theory that all knowledge is derived from sense-experience. Stimulated by the rise of experimental science, it developed in the 17th and 18th centuries, expounded in particular by John Locke, George Berkeley, and David Hume.
