= Dighton Rock State Park =

State park in Massachusetts, United States

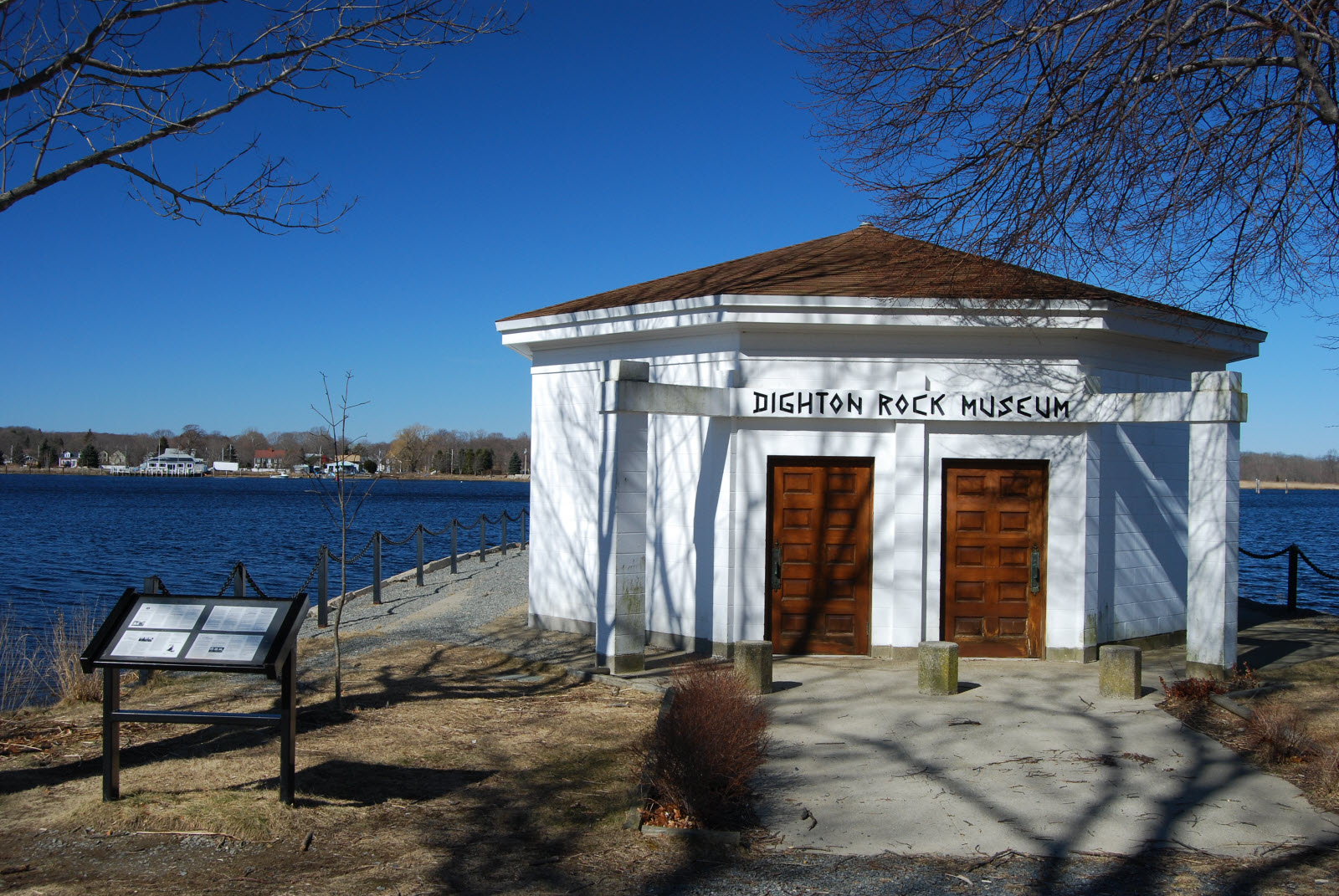
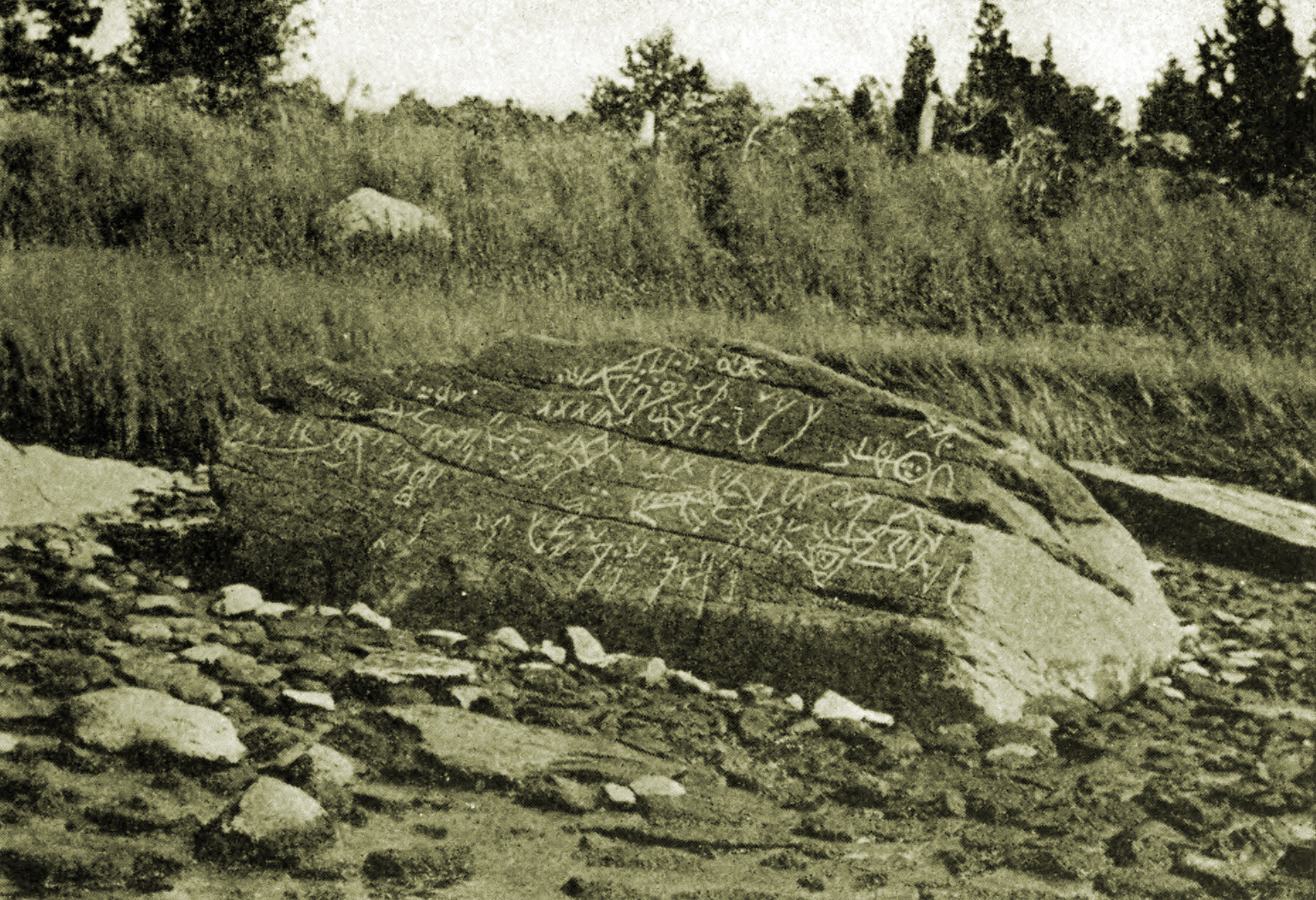
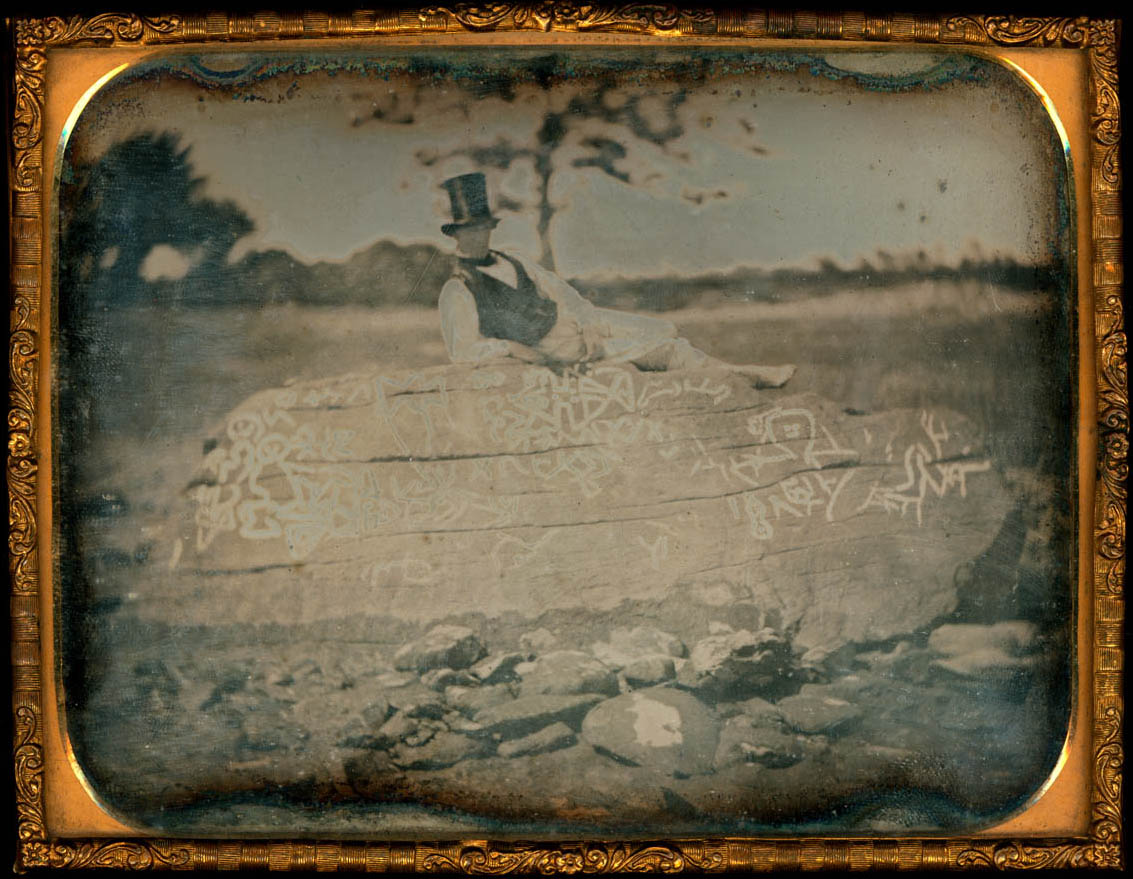
- Dighton Rock Museum 1893 1853 Historic pictures of the rock in its natural state

- Location within Massachusetts Location within the United States
- Location: Berkley, Massachusetts, United States
- Coordinates: 41°48′56″N 71°06′38″W
- Area: 98 acres (40 ha)
- Elevation: 0 ft (0 m)
- Established: 1955
- Administrator: Massachusetts Department of Conservation and Recreation
- Website: Official website

Dighton Rock State Park is a public recreation area and historic preserve located on the eastern shore of the Taunton River in the town of Berkley, Massachusetts. The 98-acre (40 ha) state park is the site of a small museum that houses the Dighton Rock, an 11-foot-high (3.4 m) glacial erratic, covered with petroglyphs, that once sat on the banks of the river. It is managed by the Massachusetts Department of Conservation and Recreation.

== Park history ==
From 1889 to 1955, the park was owned and managed by the Old Colony Historical Society. It was acquired by the state in 1955.

== Activities and amenities ==
In addition to the museum, which is only open by appointment, the park features non-motorized boating, fishing, picnicking, and trails that are used for hiking, biking, and cross-country skiing.
