= Dighton Rock =

- U.S. National Register of Historic Places
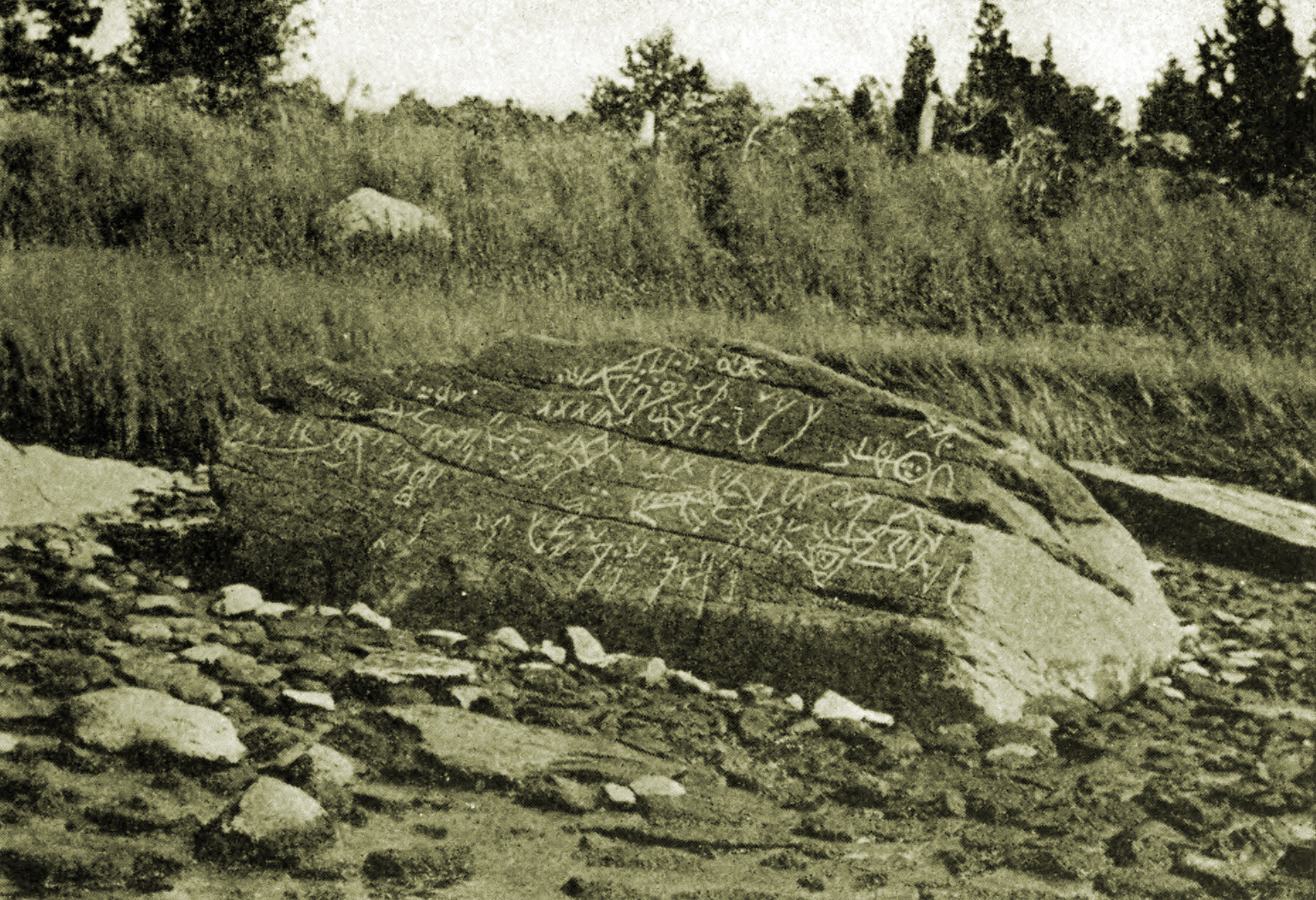

- Location within Massachusetts
- Location: Berkley, Massachusetts
- Nearest city: Dighton, Massachusetts
- Coordinates: 41°48′45.92″N 71°6′38″W
- Built: pre-1500 (petroglyphs); 1964 (enclosed after relocation)
- NRHP reference No.: 80000438
- Added to NRHP: July 1, 1980

The Dighton Rock is a 40-ton boulder composed of sandstone, originally located in the riverbed of the Taunton River at Berkley, Massachusetts, formerly part of the town of Dighton. The rock is noted for its petroglyphs, "primarily lines, geometric shapes, and schematic drawings of people, along with writing, both verified and not". The carved designs are of ancient and uncertain origin, and there is controversy as to who created them.

State officials removed the rock from the river for preservation in 1963, during construction of a coffer dam. It was installed in a museum in the nearby Dighton Rock State Park. In 1971, it was listed on the National Register of Historic Places (NRHP).

== Appearance ==
The boulder has the form of a slanted, six-sided block, approximately 5 feet (1.5 m) high, 9.5 feet (2.9 m) wide, and 11 feet (3.4 m) long. It is gray-brown crystalline sandstone of medium to coarse texture. The surface with the inscriptions has a trapezoidal face and is inclined 70 degrees to the northwest. It was found facing the water of the bay.

== History and mythology ==
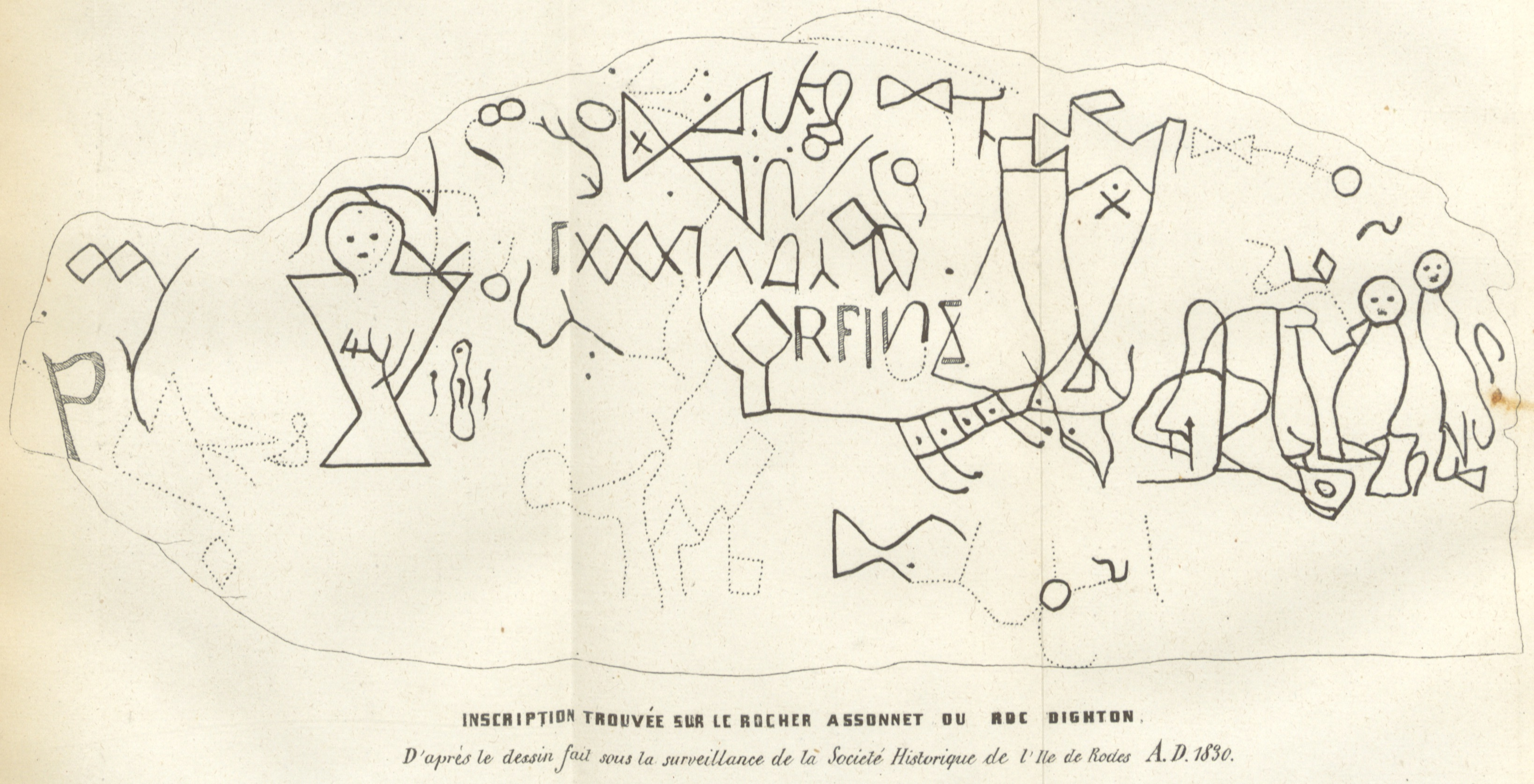
An exact copy of all symbols or petroglyphes by the Historical Commission of Providence, Rhode Island, published 1830

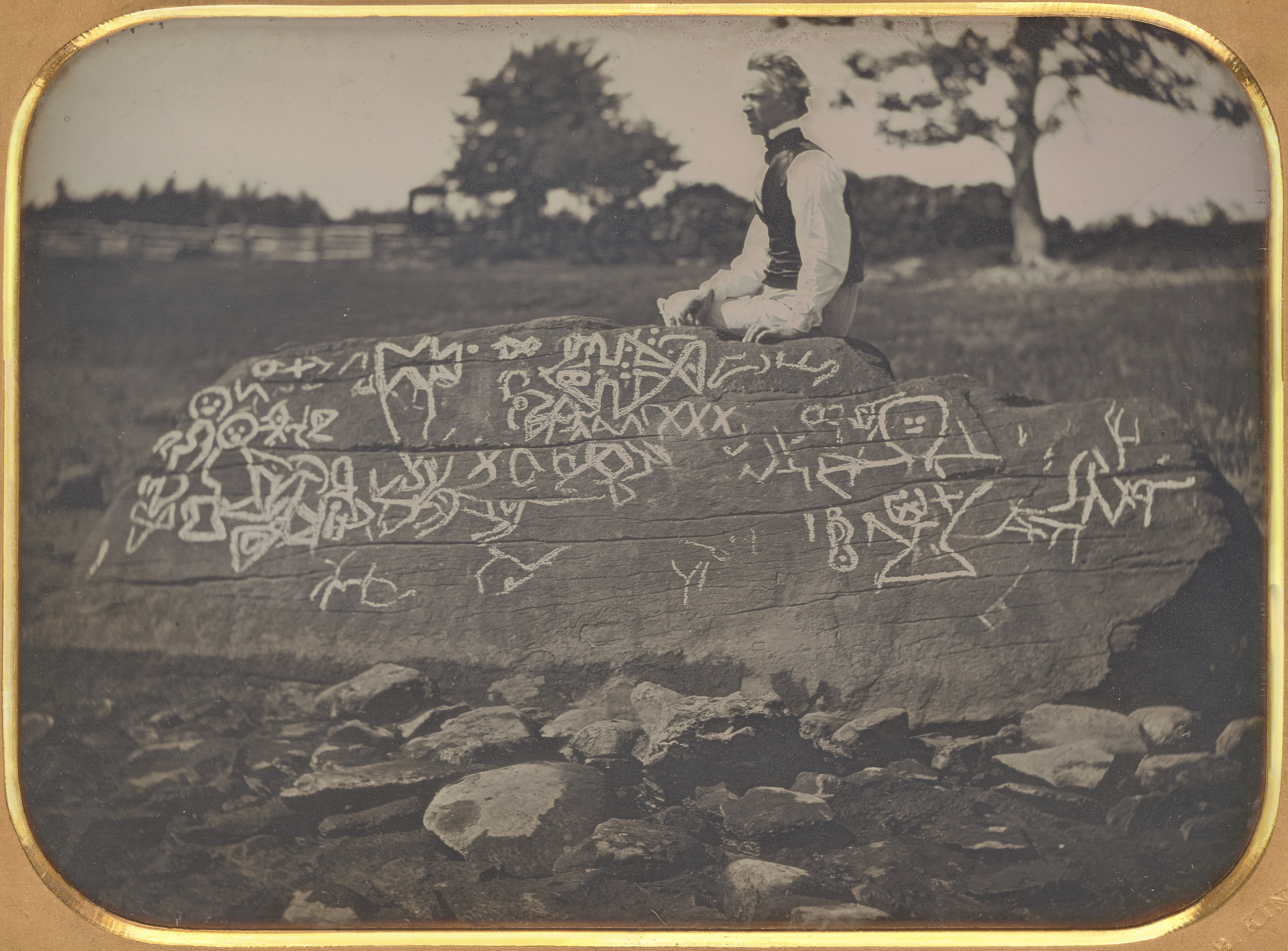
A daguerreotype mirror-reversed image of Seth Eastman on Dighton Rock, 1853

In 1680, Rev. John Danforth made a drawing of the petroglyphs which has been preserved in the British Museum. His drawing conflicts with the reports of others and the current markings on the rock. In 1690, Rev. Cotton Mather described the rock in his book The Wonderful Works of God Commemorated:

Among the other Curiosities of New-England, one is that of a mighty Rock, on a perpendicular side whereof by a River, which at High Tide covers part of it, there are very deeply Engraved, no man alive knows How or When about half a score Lines, near Ten Foot Long, and a foot and half broad, filled with strange Characters: which would suggest as odd Thoughts about them that were here before us, as there are odd Shapes in that Elaborate Monument.

In the 19th century, many popular publications and public figures mentioned the rock. Poet and critic James Russell Lowell suggested that presidential candidates' letters to newspapers should be written in its undeciphered script: "If letters must be written, profitable use might be made of the Dighton rock hieroglyphic or the cuneiform script, every fresh decipherer of which is enabled to educe a different meaning." Lowell made other references to the rock in his widely circulated satirical writing, and may have helped to popularize it.

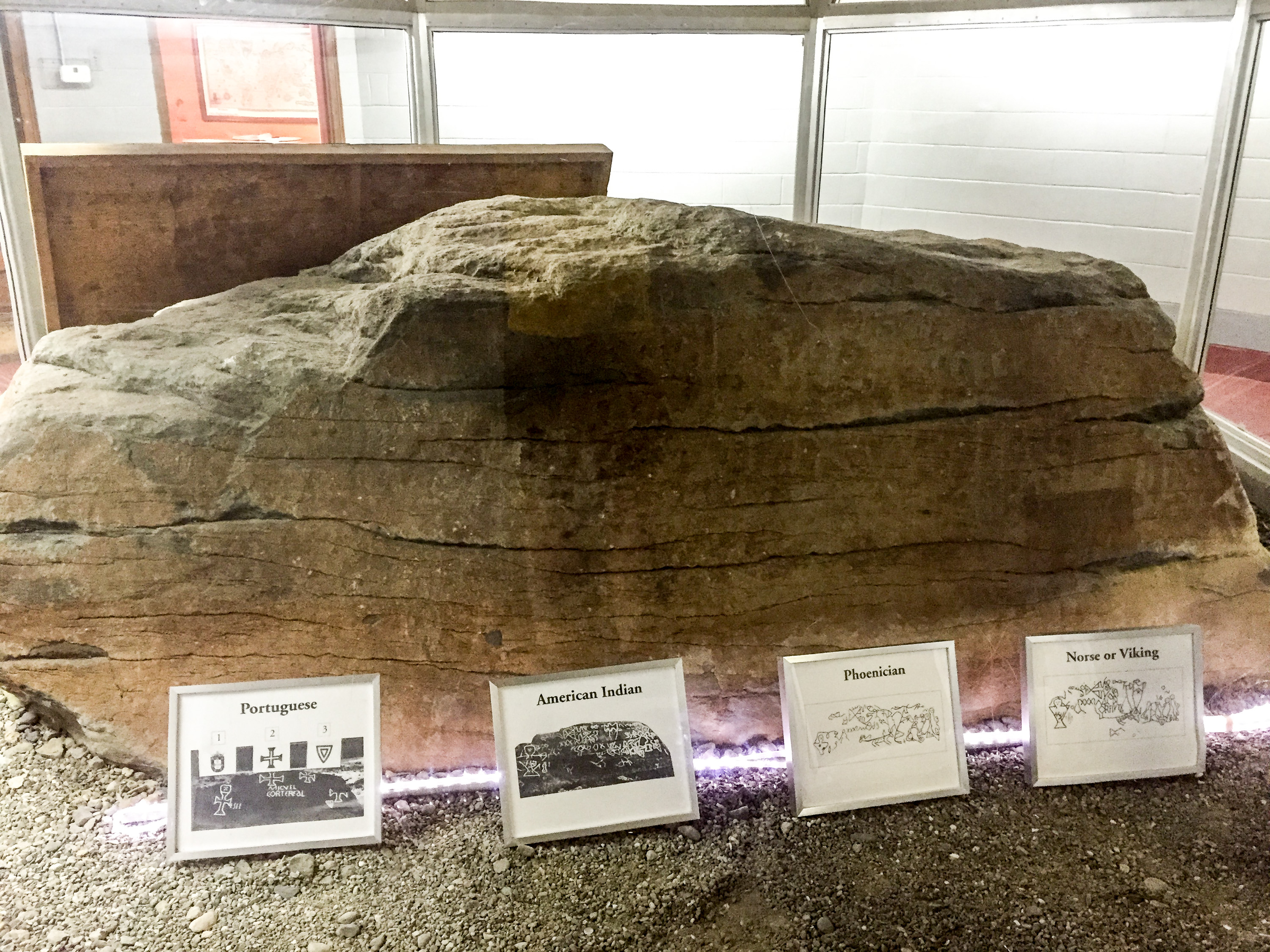
The rock in 2015 is on display in a small museum

Hypotheses about the creation of the markings include:

American Indians who were known to have inscribed petroglyphs in rocks. A schematic face on the Dighton Rock is similar to an Indian petroglyph in Eastern Vermont.

Ancient Phoenicians, proposed in 1783 by Ezra Stiles in his "Election Sermon" as the "descendants of the sons of Japheth"

Norse, proposed in 1837 by Carl Christian Rafn. This theory was rejected by archaeologists such as T. D. Kendrick and Kenneth Feder.

Portuguese explorers were proposed in 1912 by Edmund B. Delabarre, who had seen some Portuguese writing and believed that they had used the rock for their own inscriptions Delabarre wrote that markings on the Dighton Rock suggest that Miguel Corte-Real reached New England. Delabarre stated that the markings were abbreviated Latin, and the message reads as follows: "I, Miguel Cortereal, 1511. In this place, by the will of God, I became a chief of the Indians." Hunter (2017) provides copious evidence and analysis debunking the Corte-Real origin myth.

Chinese explorers, proposed by Gavin Menzies in his 2002 pseudohistorical book 1421: The Year China Discovered America

== Depths of inscriptions ==
Although Mather described these as deeply cut, a statement which has been repeated to the present day, early reports suggested that this was not exactly the case. DelaBarre wrote:

One thing is certain, that former descriptions of the depth of the incisions cannot be used as evidence for any change. The first who describes them calls them "deeply engraved" in 1690; but Cotton Mather had never seen the rock, so far as we know, and this statement of his is doubtless on a par with his other statement that the characters are on "a mighty Rock." Greenwood gives the first reliable description, in 1730. He definitely says that the "indentures are not very considerable," and his drawing and his other statements prove that he had as much difficulty in making out the real characters as has ever been experienced since then. Even on the lowest part of the face, which alone does show evident signs of much wear, Mather's draughtsman, and Greenwood, and their next followers, were even less successful in making out apparent characters than have been some later observers. Sewall in 1768 and Kendall in 1807 made definite statements to the effect that the greater part of the lines were so much effaced as to make their decipherment impossible, or wholly subject to the fancy.

== See also ==
- List of individual rocks
- National Register of Historic Places listings in Bristol County, Massachusetts
- Newport Tower (Rhode Island)
