= House at 30 Kelton Street =

Historic house in Massachusetts, United States

- U.S. National Register of Historic Places
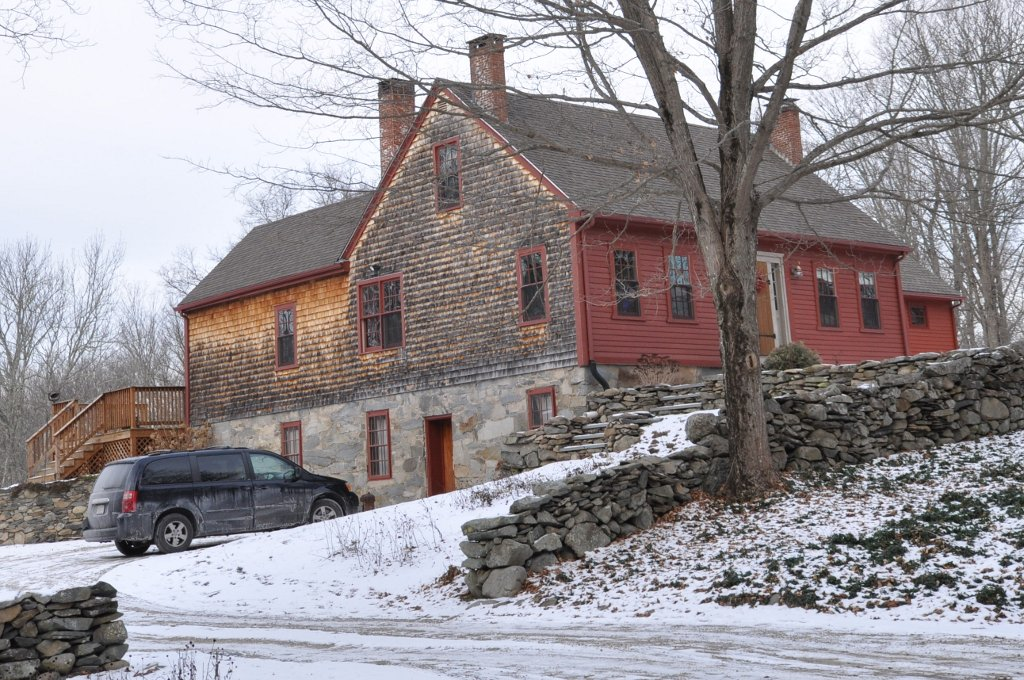

- Location within Massachusetts Location within the United States
- Location: 30 Kelton St., Rehoboth, Massachusetts
- Coordinates: 41°49′50″N 71°13′51″W
- Built: 1895
- Architectural style: Greek Revival, Italianate
- MPS: Rehoboth MRA
- NRHP reference No.: 83000682
- Added to NRHP: June 6, 1983

30 Kelton Street is a historic house located in Rehoboth, Massachusetts, and is locally significant as the town's finest example of an end-chimney Greek Revival cottage.

== Description and history ==
It is a 1 1/2-story, Cape style structure, with a central entry flanked by sidelight windows. The interior has been somewhat modified (by the removal of a wall and the addition of a bathroom, among others) but its original layout is readily discerned. The house may have been built by L. Bowen, probably a son of Nathan Bowen, whose house also stands nearby.

The house was listed on the National Register of Historic Places on June 6, 1983.

== See also ==
- National Register of Historic Places listings in Bristol County, Massachusetts
