= Amidon =

Amidon may refer to:

== People ==
- Charles F. Amidon (1856–1937), United States District Judge of the United States District Court for the District of North Dakota
- Edna P. Amidon (1895–1982), chief of the Home Economics Education Service in the US Office of Education from 1938 to 1964
- George H. Amidon (1904–1976), Vermont state commissioner of taxes and Vermont State Treasurer
- Kim Amidon, American radio personality
- Margaret Amidon (1827–1869), American educator
- Roger Amidon (1614–1673), early settler of the Massachusetts Bay Colony and a French Huguenot
- Sam Amidon (born 1981), American folk artist
- Stephen Amidon (born 1959), American author and critic

== Other uses ==
- Amidon, North Dakota, county seat of Slope County
- Amidon, a trade name for methadone
