= Annawan =

Annawan or Anawan may refer to:

- Annawan (chief) (died 1676), a Wampanoag sachem
- Anawan Rock, a colonial historic site in Rehoboth, Massachusetts
- Annawan, Illinois, a town in Illinois
- Annawan Township, in Henry County, Illinois
