= Caleb Cushing House and Farm =

Historic house in Massachusetts, United States

- U.S. National Register of Historic Places
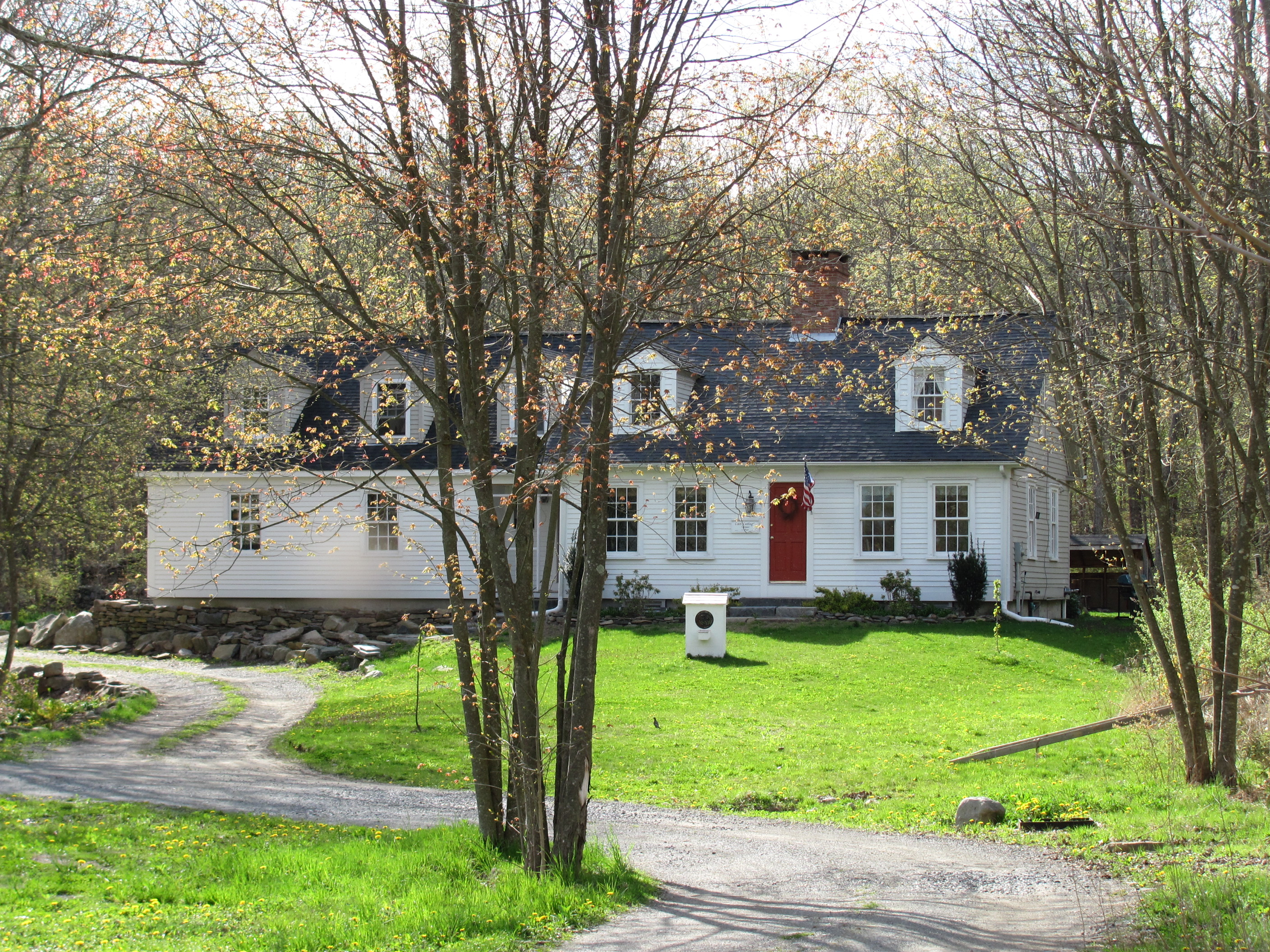
- The 1836 Cape

- Location within Massachusetts
- Location: 186 and 188 Pine St., Rehoboth, Massachusetts
- Coordinates: 41°51′4″N 71°17′17″W
- Area: 4 acres (1.6 ha)
- Built: 1740
- Architectural style: Federal
- MPS: Rehoboth MRA
- NRHP reference No.: 83000660
- Added to NRHP: June 6, 1983

The Caleb Cushing House and Farm is a historic farm property at 186 Pine Street in Rehoboth, Massachusetts. The farm, established about 1750, includes a pre-Revolutionary Georgian farmhouse and an 1836 Federal-Greek Revival Cape house, and was owned by the Cushing family into the mid-20th century. The property was listed on the National Register of Historic Places in 1983.

== Description and history ==
The Caleb Cushing House and Farm property is located in a rural area of central western Rehoboth, on the west side of Pine Street a short way south of its junction with Salisbury Street. The main house is set in a yard lined by a picket fence; it is a 2 1/2-story wood-frame structure, with a side-gable roof, central chimney and clapboarded exterior. A small gabled porch shelters the center entrance. The interior retains original fireplace mantels, and some doors, in addition to other period features. Built sometime between the 1740s and 1770s by Joseah Cushing, it is one of the best-preserved and least-altered pre-Revolutionary houses in the town.

A short way north of the main house stands a 1 1/2-story Cape, also of wood-frame construction. It has a side-gable roof pierced by two gabled dormers, a central chimney, and clapboarded exterior. A three-bay ell to the left nearly doubles the size of the house; it houses a secondary entrance, and its roof has three dormers. The main entrance features a Greek Revival surround. This house was built in 1836, by family lore due to a dispute involving a spinster aunt, who then resided here.

== See also ==
- National Register of Historic Places listings in Bristol County, Massachusetts
