= Hornbine Baptist Church =

Historic church in Massachusetts, United States

- U.S. National Register of Historic Places
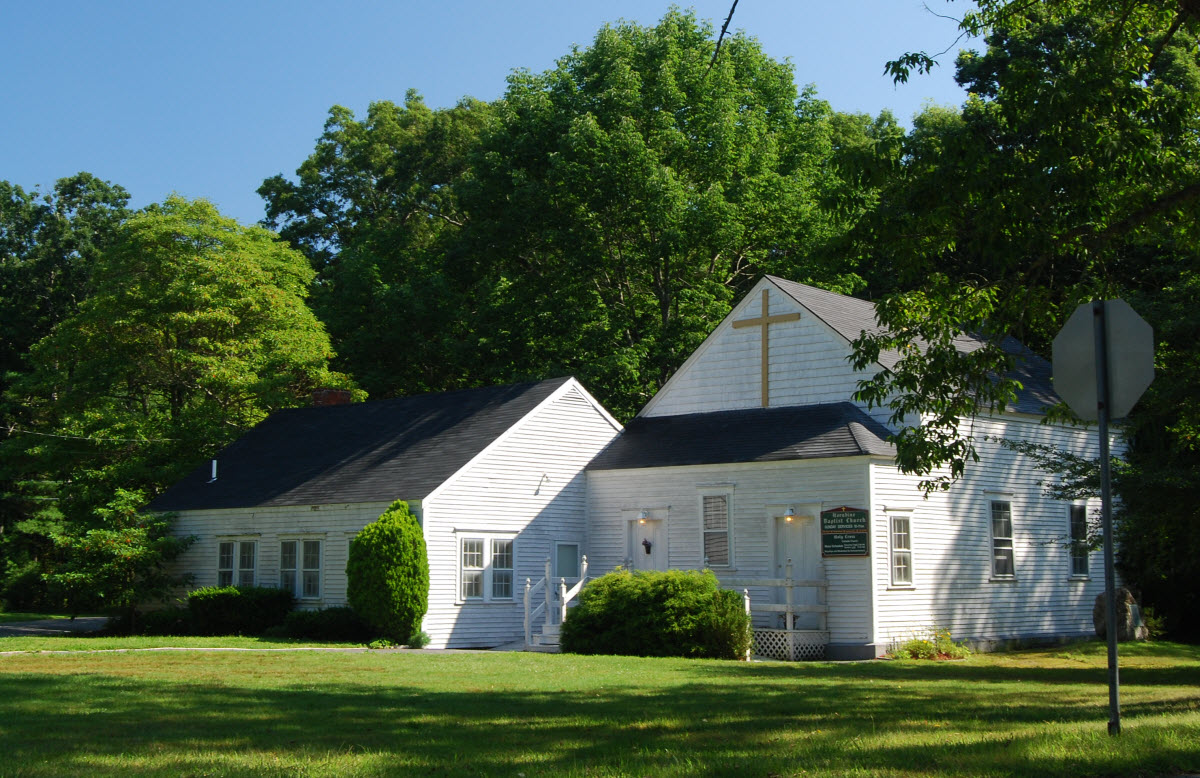

- Location within Massachusetts Location within the United States
- Location: Rehoboth, Massachusetts
- Coordinates: 41°47′55″N 71°12′3″W
- Area: less than one acre
- Built: 1753
- MPS: Rehoboth MRA
- NRHP reference No.: 83000678
- Added to NRHP: June 6, 1983

The Hornbine Baptist Church is an historic colonial church at 141 Hornbine Road in Rehoboth, Massachusetts. This modest vernacular structure was built in 1753, and is the oldest Baptist meeting house in southeastern Massachusetts. It is a single-story wood-frame structure, with a front-facing gable roof and clapboard siding, set at the northeast corner of Hornbine and Baker Streets, opposite the Hornbine School. A hip-roofed enclosed vestibule extends across the west-facing front facade, with a pair of entrances flanking a single sash window. A "social hall" addition extends northward from the northwestern corner of the building.

== History ==
When built in 1753, the interior had a single large open space, with the pulpit on the north wall. In 1802 galleries were added to either end, and pews were installed. The pulpit was also enlarged at this time, with stairs on either side. At a later date the space was again rearranged, and the pulpit, now reduced in size, is in the southeast corner. The current entrance was added in 1869, as was the social hall (extended to its present size just a few years later). The chandelier and four bracket lamps were added at this time, and were electrified in the 20th century. The 1870s also saw the construction of horse sheds, which were removed in the 1920s.

The church was listed on the National Register of Historic Places in 1983.

By 1995, the Baptist congregation was struggling with a dwindling membership and held services twice a month.

== Holy Cross Catholic Church ==
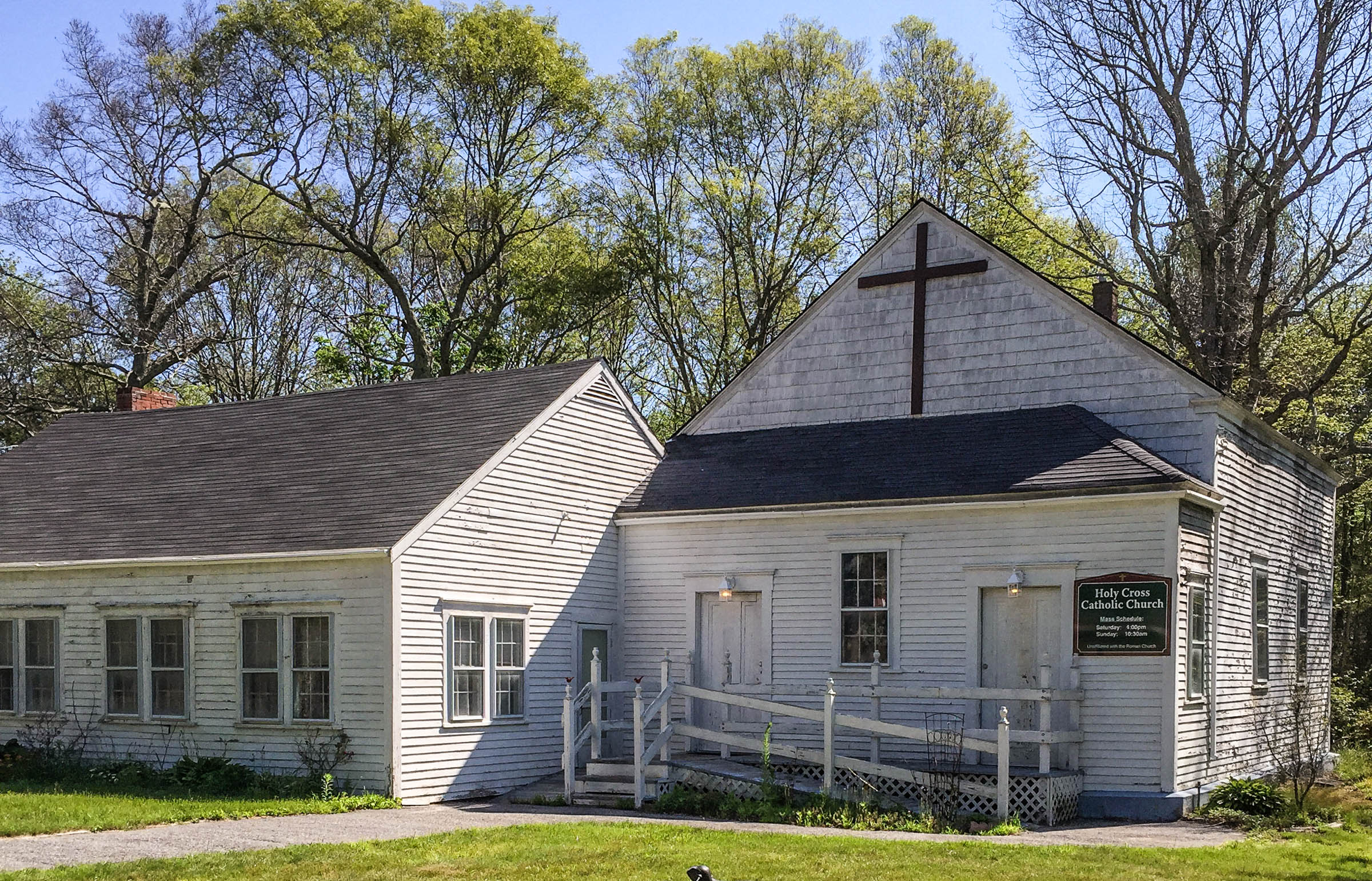
Sign in 2015 identifies the building as the Holy Cross Catholic Church; smaller type below that says "Unaffiliated with the Roman Church"

Sometime between 2009 and 2015, the church at 141 Hornbine Road has become the home of the Holy Cross Catholic Church. This church is part of the independent federation of Old Catholic Churches, which split from Roman Catholicism.

== See also ==
- National Register of Historic Places listings in Bristol County, Massachusetts
