= Carpenter Museum =

Local history museum in Massachusetts, United States

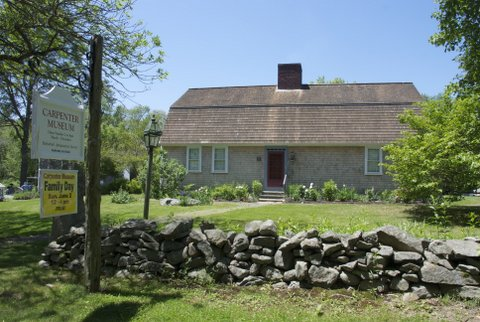
- The Carpenter Museum in Rehoboth, Massachusetts

- Location in Massachusetts
- Established: 1976
- Location: 4 Locust Avenue, Rehoboth, Massachusetts, United States
- Coordinates: 41.840131°N 71.251961°W
- Type: Local History Heritage centre
- Website: www.carpentermuseum.org

The Carpenter Museum in Rehoboth, Massachusetts is the town's museum of local history, originating during the American Bicentennial year as a facility to house the collection of the Rehoboth Antiquarian Society which was incorporated in 1884.

== Foundation ==
The Carpenter Museum utilized a seed donation of land and money from town residents Elsie and E. Winsor Carpenter. A fund drive raised additional funds to build the new museum facility which opened in 1978 after two years of preparation and construction. The structure, modeled after a local 1760 gambrel-roofed house, contains exhibit rooms, an artifact storage area, and a social room with kitchen facilities. The museum contains over 4,000 artifacts related to the history and families who lived and worked in Rehoboth.

== Activities ==
The museum hosts special and local interest events in its community room. It has a gift shop specializing on Rehoboth history and its people. For an example,Tea with Emily was an event held in 2011 that introduced about fifty women and girls to Emily Dickinson poetry, 19th century hats and tea. Monthly meetings include the Astronomical Society of Southern New England which meets monthly at the museum. It also host annual events. These include:

- Arts in the Village Concerts, in conjunction with the Rehoboth Antiquarian Society
- Fall Flower Show, in conjunction with the Rehoboth Garden Club
- Folk Arts & Artesian Show
- Horror Stories Grounded in Rehoboth
- Ice Harvesting & Ice Cream
- Remembering Rehoboth School Days
- Summer Clam Bake

The Carpenter Museum has a number of holdings of national interest, including its collection of early needlework samplers made in the United States.

== Expansion ==
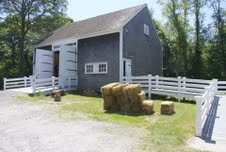
The E. Otis Dyer Barn next to the Carpenter Museum, constructed in 1993

On the museum grounds is a reproduction of a 1746 post-and-beam barn constructed in 1993 with a community barn raising in celebration of Rehoboth's 350th anniversary. The wood used in the construction was "red and white oaks and white pines from the land of E. Otis Dyer" collected in the fall of 1992. E. Otis Dyer is a long-term supporter of the Rehoboth Antiquarian Society and the barn was named in his honor. The official name of the barn is the E. Otis Dyer Barn.

== Recognition ==
In 2013, the museum won the Gold Star Award of the Massachusetts Cultural Council, an annual award presented to artists and organizations who demonstrate “success in integrating the arts into the community", for the museum's “Remembering Rehoboth School Days” project.

The museum and staff are noted in the following book and pamphlet.

- Rehoboth, Swansea And Dighton, MA (IMG) (Images of America) by Charles Turek Robinson and Frank DeMattos (Jan 6, 1998). ISBN 0738565636
- Rehoboth Through the Ages By Frank DeMattos, private publishing, Rehoboth, MA.
