= Briggs Tavern =

- U.S. National Register of Historic Places
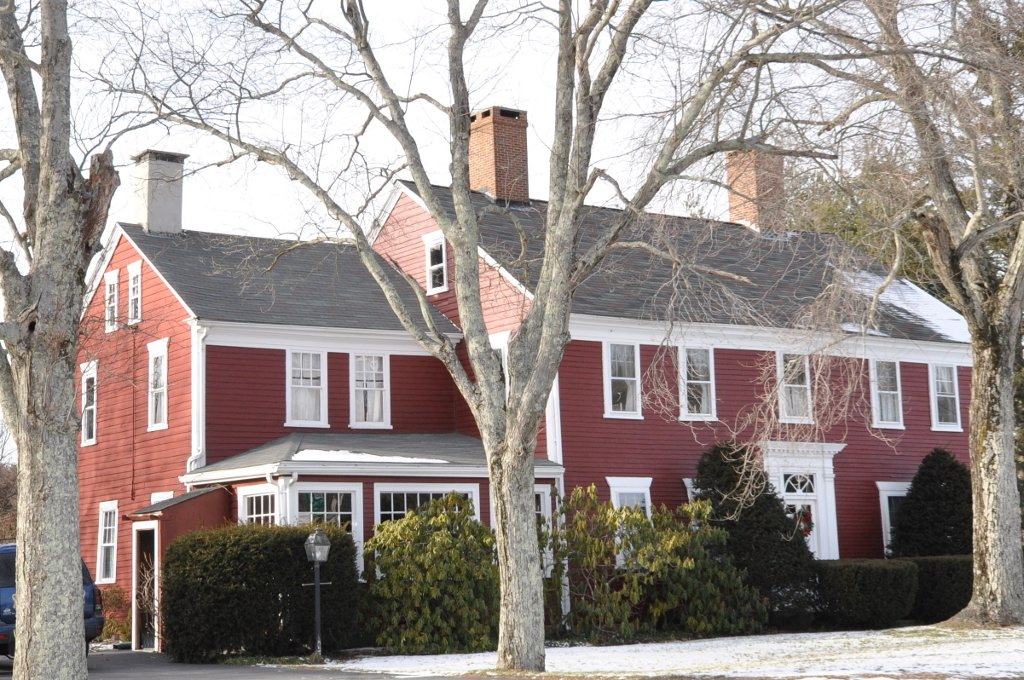

- Location within Massachusetts Location within the United States
- Location: Rehoboth, Massachusetts
- Coordinates: 41°54′13″N 71°13′9″W
- Area: 2 acres (0.81 ha)
- Built: 1780
- Architectural style: Federal
- MPS: Rehoboth MRA
- NRHP reference No.: 83000636
- Added to NRHP: June 6, 1983

The Briggs Tavern is a historic building at 2 Anawan Street in Rehoboth, Massachusetts. Built about 1780 and now used as a private residence, it is the town's only surviving 18th-century commercial building. It was listed on the National Register of Historic Places in 1983.

== Description and history ==
The former Briggs Tavern building stands in a rural area of northern Rehoboth, at the southwest corner of Anawan and Tremont Streets. These roads are both historically old transportation routes, with Anawan and the western heading of Tremont designated Massachusetts Route 118. The tavern is a 2 1/2-story wood-frame structure, with a side gable roof, two interior chimneys, and a clapboarded exterior. The main facade is five bays wide, with sash windows in most bays, and a center entrance flanked by pilasters and topped by a rectangular transom with half-round tracery and a corniced entablature above. A two-story ell extends to the left, with a single-story hip-roof addition in front of it.

The tavern was built about 1780, in what was known at the time as Stevens Corner. Its interior retains a number of important period features, including paneled fireplace surrounds, chair rails and wainscoting, and splayed window lintels; the latter is a particularly rare feature in early Rehoboth architecture. The ell was added to the left side in the 19th century. The tavern was listed on the National Register of Historic Places in 1983.

== See also ==
- National Register of Historic Places listings in Bristol County, Massachusetts
