= Annawan (chief) =

Sachem of the Wampanoag

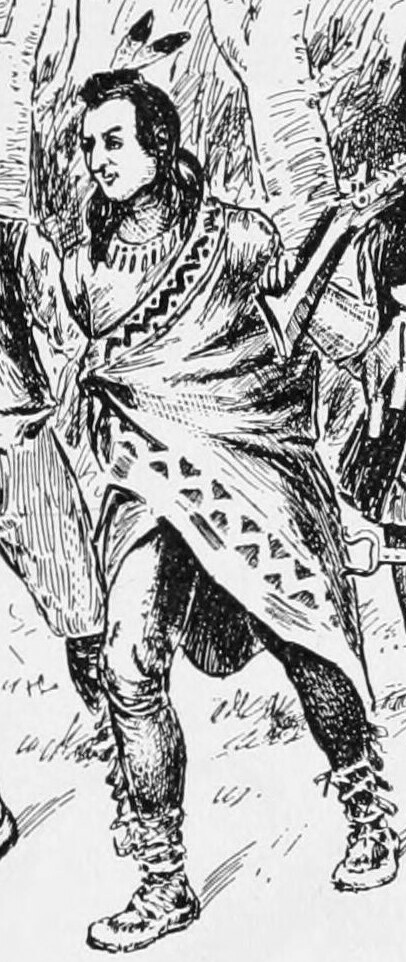

Wampanoag Sachem
- Preceded by: Metacom

Personal details
- Died: August 1676 Plymouth
- Cause of death: Execution

Annawan (Note: Also spelled Anawan and Annawon.) (died 1676) was a military leader and advisor of the Wampanoag. As head captain under sachem Massasoit, Annawan fought wars with rival New England Indian tribes and became renowned as a warrior. Under Massasoit's son, Metacomet (King Philip), Annawan, as head chief, led the Wampanoag war effort against the Plymouth colonists.

After the death of Metacomet in 1676, Annawan succeeded him as sachem and organized the remaining Wampanoag and established a strategic position at Anawan Rock. Later that year, Captain Benjamin Church led a small colonial party to the stronghold and forced their surrender. Annawan presented his royal regalia, inherited from Metacomet—including his wampum belts—to Church, who pleaded for Annawan's life, but was unable to stop the Plymouth officials from exacting justice after he admitted to having tortured and murdered several colonists during the course of King Philip's War. Annawan was executed at Plymouth in August 1676 and his severed head displayed without town.

== Titles ==
Annawan served as chief counselor and head captain under King Philip (Metacomet) in the eponymous King Philip's War against the New England colonists, having earlier served under Philip's father, sachem Massasoit, in wars with other New England Indian tribes. He was recognized as a great and valiant warrior, even among his enemies.

== King Philip's War ==
King Philip was killed in an attack on his Misery Swamp fortress, near Mount Hope, on August 12, 1676. After the ensuing rout, only a remnant of his people were left at large, under two principal chiefs, Tispaquin and Annawan. Of these chiefs Annawan was the more important, having been Philip's head captain. Though he was an old man at this time, Annawan rallied the surviving warriors and they continued to attack settlers of Swansea and Plymouth, constantly moving their camp to avoid discovery.

=== Anawan Rock ===
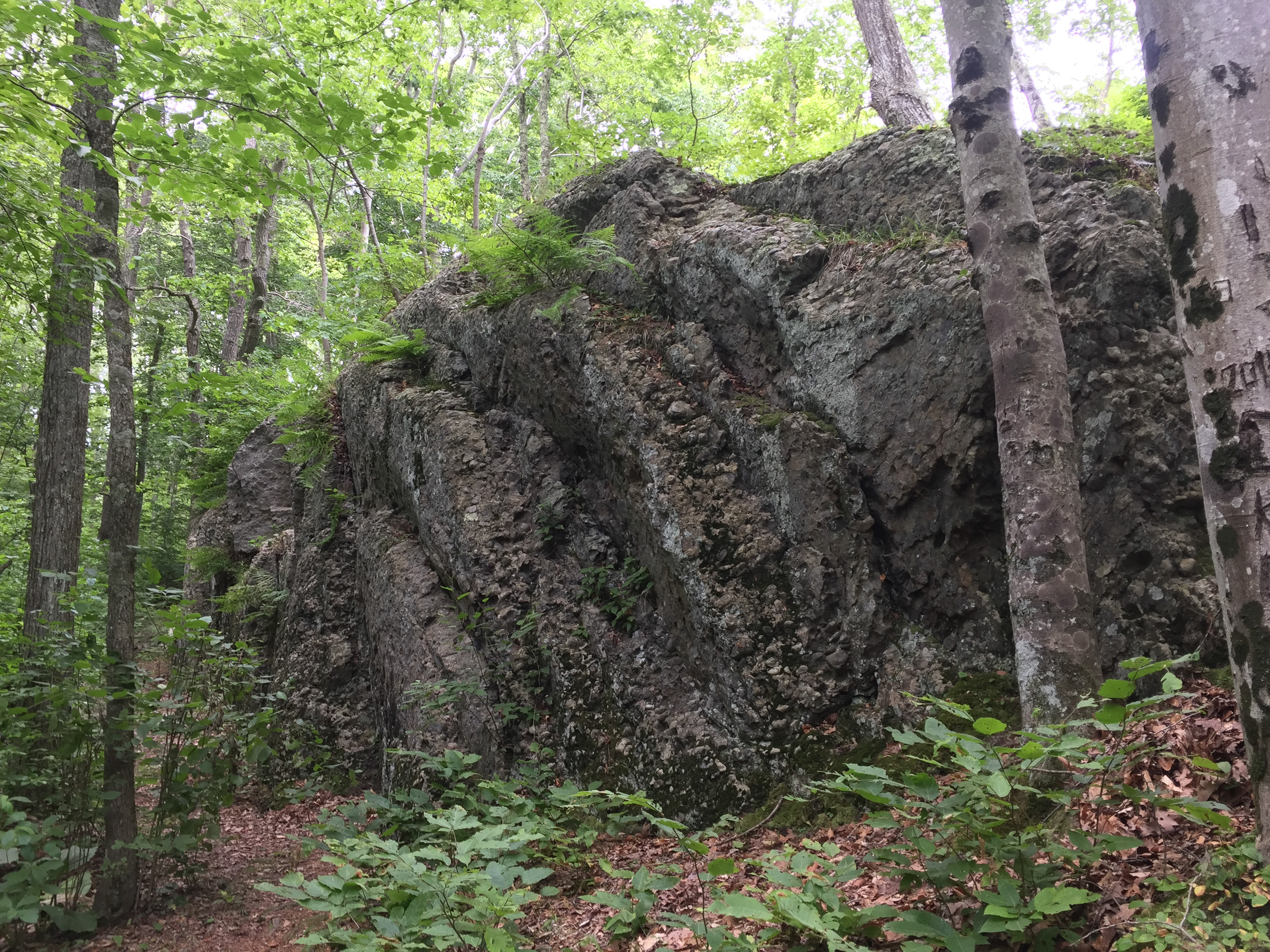
Anawan Rock, near Rehoboth: Annawan's last camp

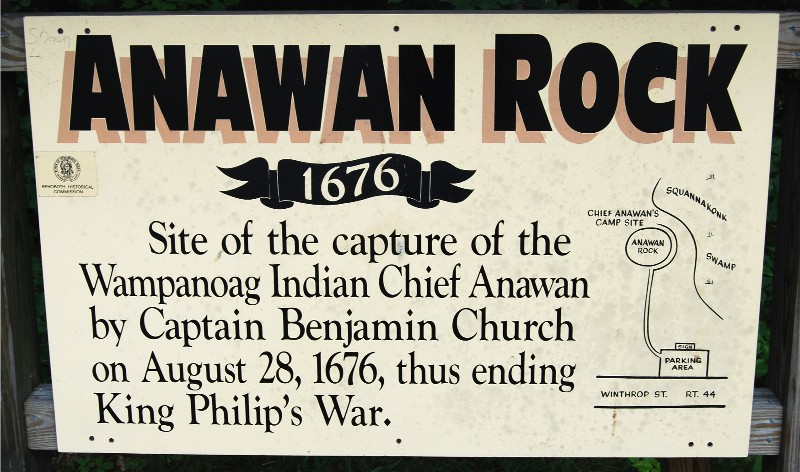
Sign at Anawan Rock historic site

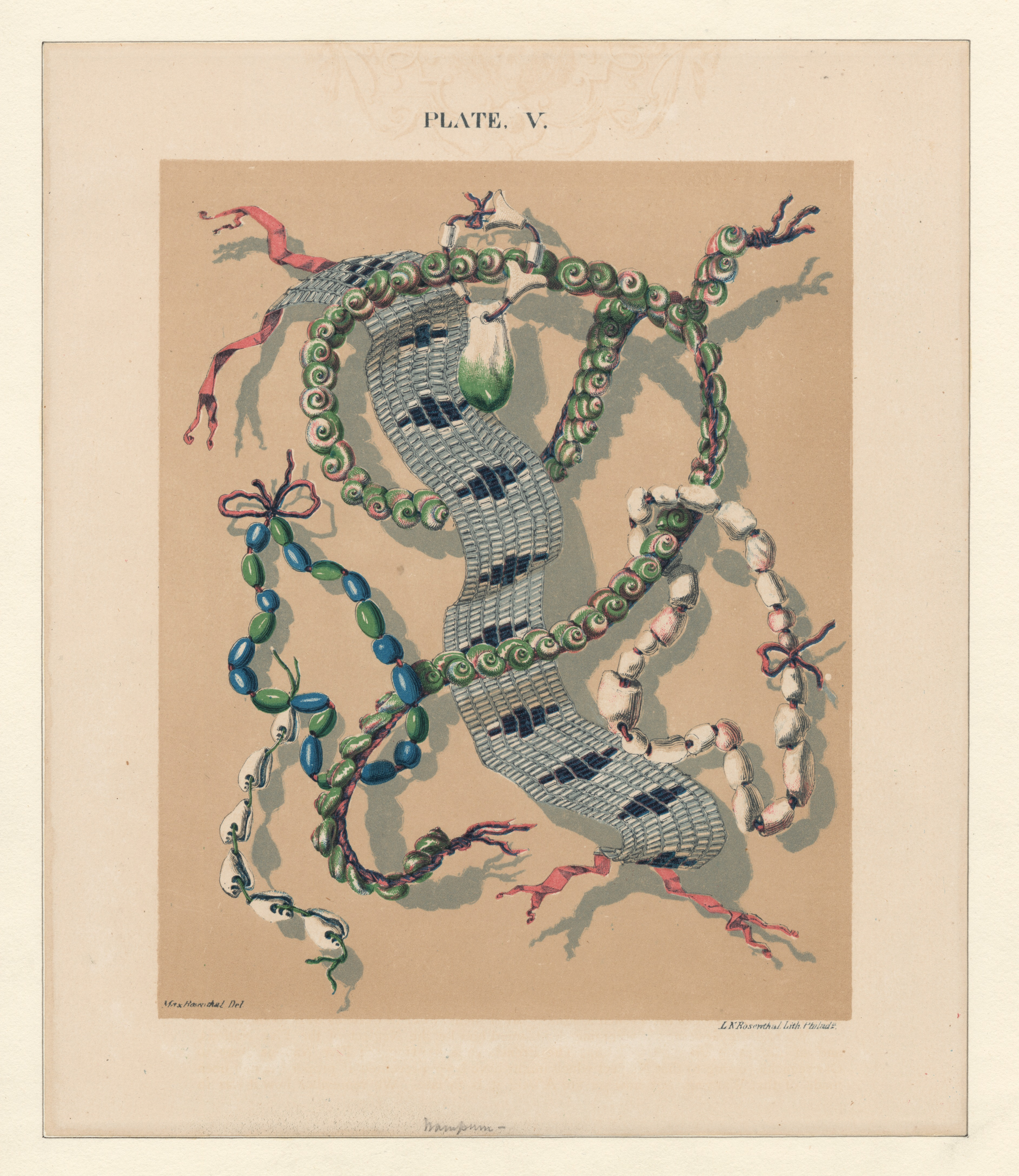
Wampum (1754)

Later that year (1676), a captive Indian led a small colonial party under Captain Benjamin Church to Annawan's elevated retreat, now known as Anawan Rock, a hill set in swampland near the Rehoboth River. There on August 28 they surprised and captured Annawan and his chief counselors. The main party of Indian warriors was tricked into surrendering when Church told them that his army had encircled their position. Annawan, correctly believing his party to be the last to resist the English, gave Church a deer-skin bundle containing Philip's wampum belts, symbols of his chiefdom, and other effects:

Then opening his pack, he pull'd out Philips belt curiously wrought with Wompom, being Nine inches broad, wrought with black and white Wompom, in various figures and flowers, and pictures of many birds and beasts. This when hung upon Capt. Churches shoulders it reach'd his ancles. And another belt of Wompom he presented him with, wrought after the former manner, which Philip was wont to put upon his head; it had two flags on the back part which hung down on his back: and another small belt with a Star upon the end of it, which he used to hang on his breast; and they were all edg'd with red hair, which Annawon said they got in the Muhhogs Country. Then he pulled out two horns of glazed Powder, and a red cloth Blanket: he told Capt. Church, these were Philips Royalties which he was wont to adorn himself with when he sat in State.

== Death ==
The capture of Anawan marked the final event in King Philip's War. Although Church pleaded for Annawan's life, his confession that he had tortured and killed several English captives compelled the Plymouth officials to have him executed and decapitated while Church was away. The heads of Annawan and Tispaquin were then stuck up for all to see.

== Sources ==
- Church, Benjamin (1716). Entertaining Passages relating to Philip's War. Boston: B. Green. pp.
- Gille, Frank H., ed. (1999). "Annawan". In Encyclopedia of Massachusetts Indians. Vol. 1. St. Clair Shores, MI.: Somerset Publishers, Inc.
- Mowry, William Augustus; Mowry, Arthur May (1914). First Steps in the History of Our Country. Rev. ed. New York, Boston, Chicago: Silver Burdett and Company. pp. 95–100
- Sabin, Edwin L. (1919). "The Capture of Old Chief Annawan". Boys' Book of Frontier Fighters. Philadelphia: George W. Jacobs & Co.
