= Isaac Case =

19th-century American religious figure

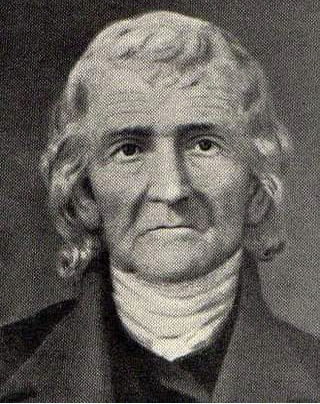
Isaac Case, Baptist church planter in Maine.

Isaac Case (February 2, 1761 – November 3, 1852) was an itinerant Baptist pastor, evangelist, and church planter in Maine and the Maritimes, who was recognized by Baptists of the 19th century as "one of the most useful ministers of his day."

Case was born in Rehoboth, Bristol County, Massachusetts, near the eastern border with Rhode Island, of parents (as well as other relations) who were confirmed Baptists. Case's education was rudimentary, and he never learned to read well, though he kept scraps of a journal. In April 1777, Case enlisted in the Continental Army during the American Revolutionary War and served in the Rhode Island Militia.

Case said he was "led to Christ as his savior at the age of eighteen" (in 1779) and joined the Baptist church in Dighton, Massachusetts. From 1780 to 1783, he engaged in an itinerant ministry, preaching at Cape Cod, Harwich, Barnstable, Haverhill, Newton, and Brentwood, New Hampshire, as well as north central Massachusetts and Vermont. In 1782, Isaac Backus read to Case a letter from a former parishioner who was currently living on the frontier of Maine. Case said that through the letter he had "heard the Macedonian cry." In 1783, he was ordained to the ministry, and by May 1784, he had founded a Baptist church at Thomaston, Maine. The church called him as pastor but also allowed him to continue his itinerant ministry.

One prominent convert was the business man and boat builder, Elisha Snow, who soon afterward became a full-time minister himself. Case married Snow's daughter Joanna, and they eventually had ten children. In 1786 Isaac Backus wrote in his diary that under Case's ministry "a glorious work of grace has been wrought on our eastern shores." In 1792, Case organized a church in Readfield and became its pastor, leaving Snow in charge of the church at Thomaston. Again, Case continued his work as an itinerant. When the Massachusetts Baptist Missionary Society was organized in 1802, Case was one of two missionaries appointed for "the British Provinces and the District of Maine."

By 1807 Case was in Nova Scotia, where the government did not oppose him, and he was able to preach freely in many villages. In 1857, a man who had heard Case forty years earlier recalled that he was "a marked man. He was not distinguished by any thing in his physical appearance. He was about a medium size, and in all his physical developments much like other men. But his countenance wore the marks of habitual devotion. Yet it was a devotion without gloom. He appeared to enjoy religion. Progress and praise and love to Christ and defense of the Gospel seemed to be the happy elements of his everyday life. He was sparing in his words, and never spoke but that he seemed to have an object to accomplish. His general mien and bearing bespoke the reign of peace within."

Case founded a great many Baptist churches in Maine and the Maritimes, and he baptized hundreds. He died at age 91 and was buried in Readfield, literally "beneath the spot where he preached more or less 46 years."
