= Brown House (Rehoboth, Massachusetts) =

Historic house in Massachusetts, United States

- U.S. National Register of Historic Places
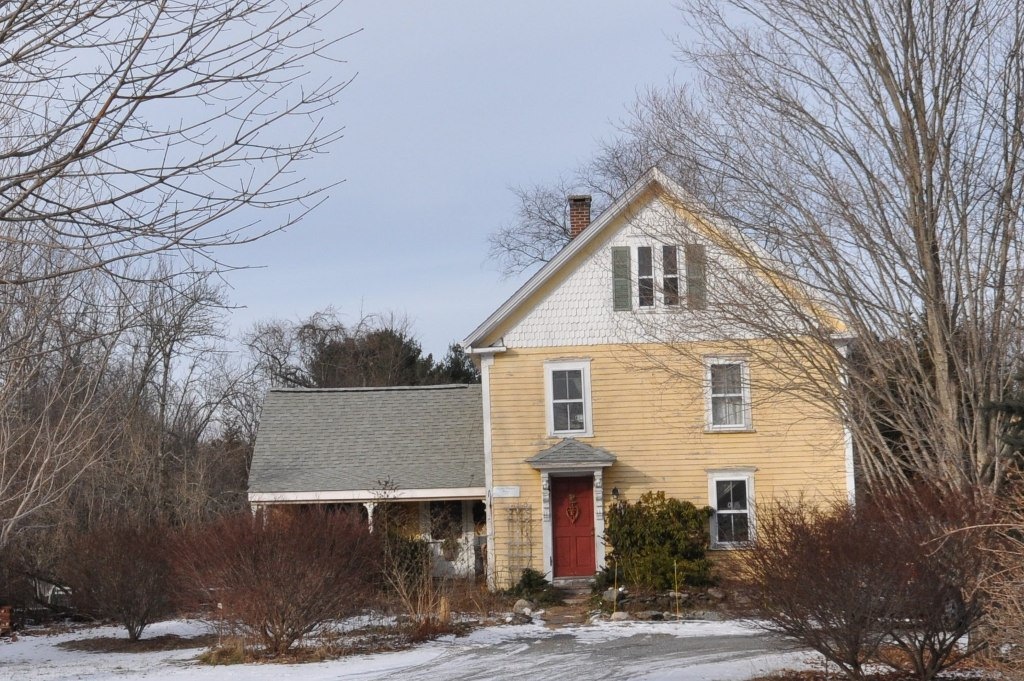

- Location within Massachusetts Location within the United States
- Location: Rehoboth, Massachusetts
- Coordinates: 41°54′7″N 71°15′48″W
- Built: 1700
- Architectural style: Italianate
- MPS: Rehoboth MRA
- NRHP reference No.: 83000639
- Added to NRHP: June 6, 1983

The Brown House is a historic house at 384 Tremont Street in Rehoboth, Massachusetts. This 2 1/2-story wood-frame house has an unusual construction history. According to a local history, at its core is a structure built in the early 18th century, which was significantly modified and extended in the late 19th century with vernacular Italianate styling. The architectural evidence supports the idea that part of the house was in fact built in the 18th century.

The house was listed on the National Register of Historic Places in 1983.

== See also ==
- National Register of Historic Places listings in Bristol County, Massachusetts
