= Martin Farm (Rehoboth, Massachusetts) =

- U.S. National Register of Historic Places
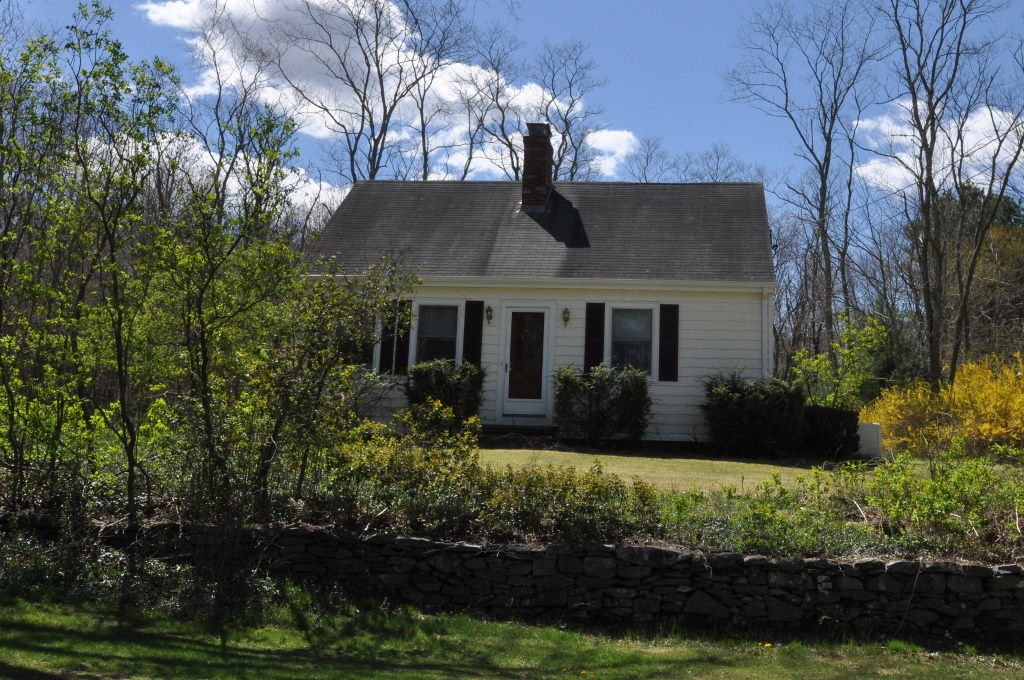

- Location within Massachusetts Location within the United States
- Location: Rehoboth, Massachusetts
- Coordinates: 41°47′52″N 71°14′14″W
- Built: 1750
- Architectural style: Georgian
- MPS: Rehoboth MRA
- NRHP reference No.: 83000691
- Added to NRHP: June 6, 1983

The Martin Farm is a historic farmhouse at 121 Martin Street in Rehoboth, Massachusetts. It is a 1 1/2-story Cape style house, four bays wide, with a side gable roof, central chimney, and clapboard siding. The bays are asymmetrically placed, with the main entrance in the second from the right. The house was built c. 1750–80, and was expanded organically over the next 120 years. The house was (as of 1983) still in the hands of Martin family descendants.

The house was listed on the National Register of Historic Places in 1983.

== See also ==
- National Register of Historic Places listings in Bristol County, Massachusetts
