= Hornbine School =

- U.S. National Register of Historic Places
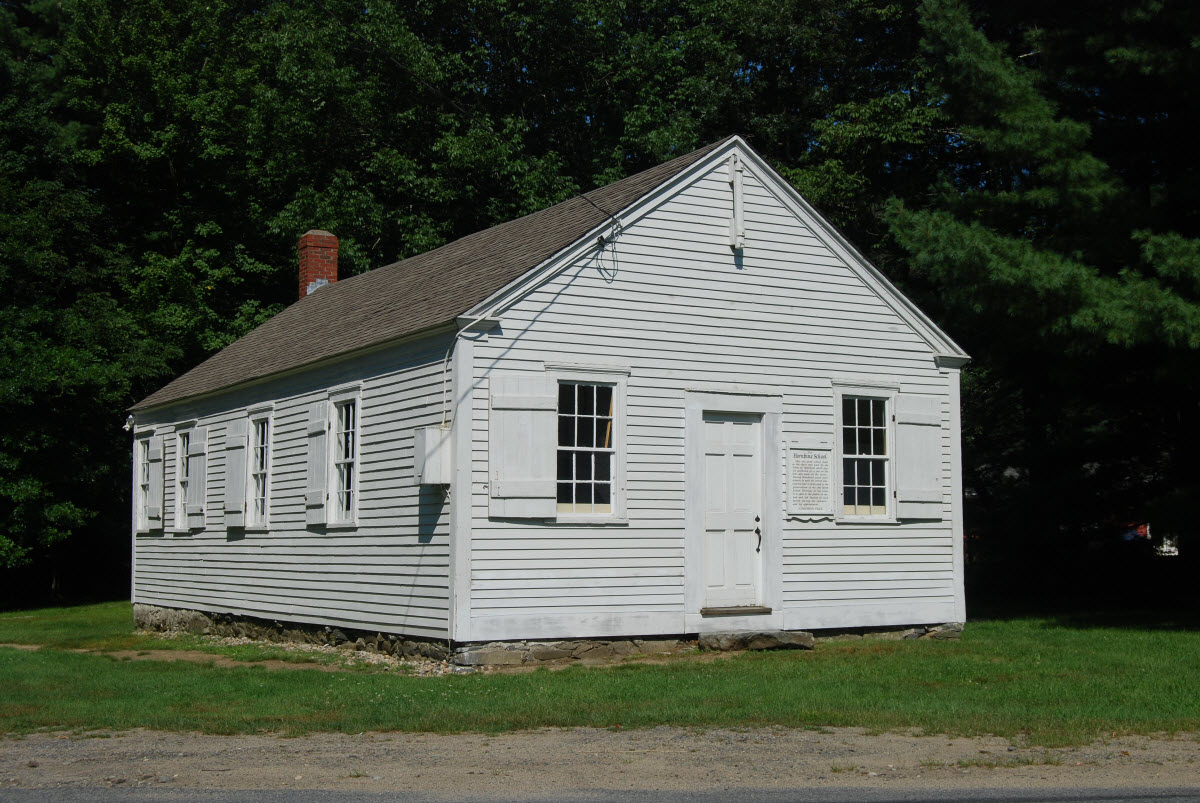

- Location within Massachusetts Location within the United States
- Location: Rehoboth, Massachusetts
- Coordinates: 41°47′54″N 71°12′05″W
- Built: 1862
- Architectural style: Greek Revival
- MPS: Rehoboth MRA
- NRHP reference No.: 83000679
- Added to NRHP: June 6, 1983

The Hornbine School is a historic one-room schoolhouse at 144 Hornbine Road in Rehoboth, Massachusetts. Built in 1846 and operated until 1937, it is the best-preserved rural schoolhouse in the town. The school was listed on the National Register of Historic Places in 1983, and now serves as a local history museum and is open for school field trips and visits.

== Description and history ==
The Hornbine School is located in southern Rehoboth, on the west side of Hornbine Road, opposite Baker Street and the Hornbine Baptist Church. It is a single-story wood-frame structure, with a front-facing gable roof, clapboard siding, and a brick chimney at the rear. The front facade, facing east, is three bays symmetrically arranged, with the entrance at the center and sash windows on either side. The side walls have four windows, irregularly placed.

The schoolhouse was built in 1862, and is the best-preserved period schoolhouse in the town. Originally one of fifteen district schools (it was district #10), it remained in use even as the town began consolidating its district schools in the 1920s, and finally closed in 1937. It was afterward converted for use as a private residence, and eventually fell into disrepair. It was acquired by the non-profit Hornbine School Association in 1968, which now operates it as a local history museum.

== See also ==
- National Register of Historic Places listings in Bristol County, Massachusetts
