= Nathan Bowen House =

Historic house in Massachusetts, United States

- U.S. National Register of Historic Places
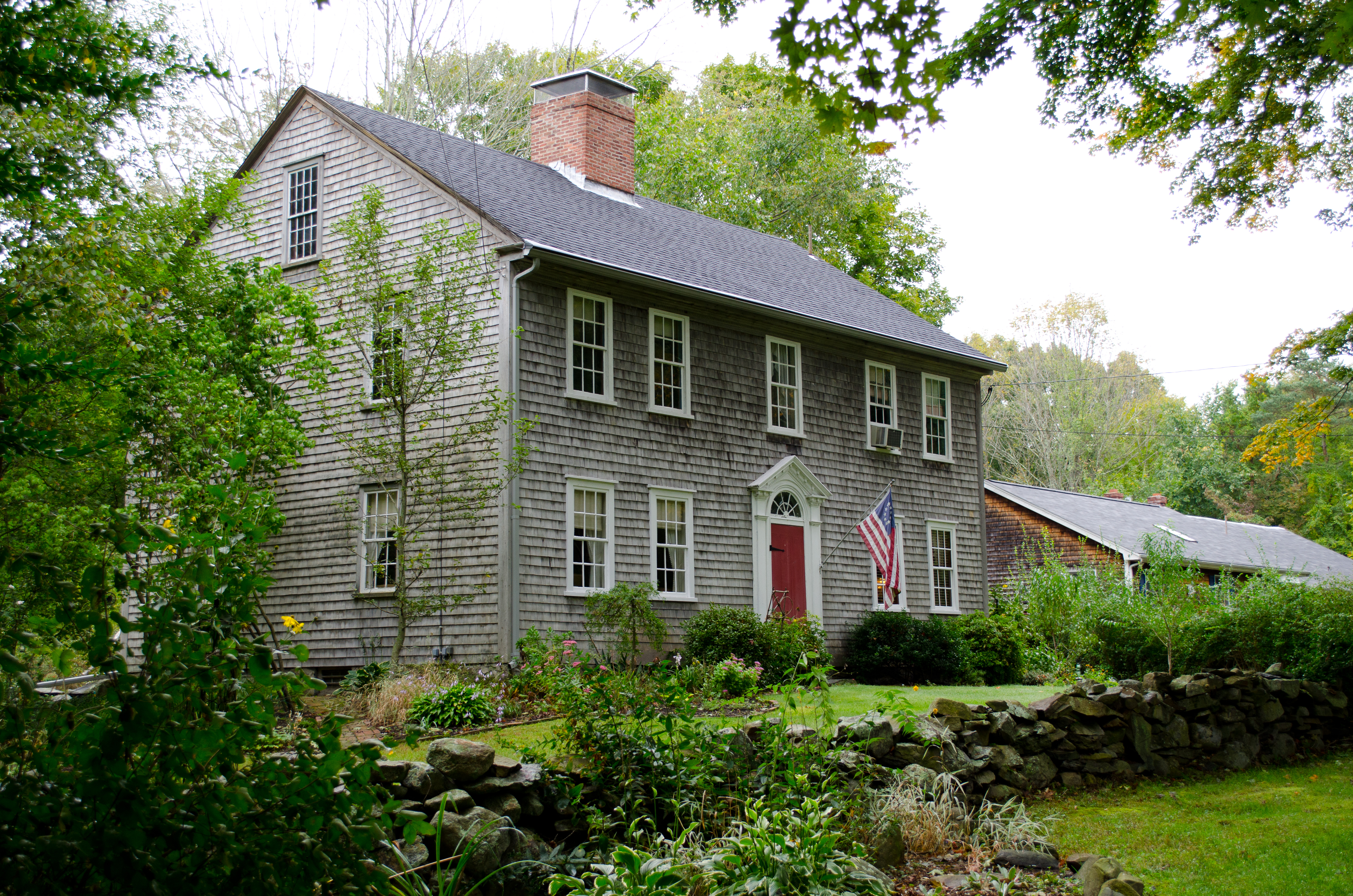

- Location within Massachusetts Location within the United States
- Location: 26 Kelton St., Rehoboth, Massachusetts
- Coordinates: 41°49′50″N 71°13′47″W
- Area: 2 acres (0.81 ha)
- Built: 1785
- Architectural style: Federal
- MPS: Rehoboth MRA
- NRHP reference No.: 83000633
- Added to NRHP: June 6, 1983

The Nathan Bowen House is a historic house at 26 Kelton Street in Rehoboth, Massachusetts.

== Description and history ==
The 2 1/2-story, wood-framed house was built in about 1785, and is one of the town's finest Federal style houses. It is relatively unaltered, with no later partitioning of its interior, which was originally designed for two households. The households are arranged one per floor, with full kitchen fireplaces with bake ovens. The house was owned by members of the Bowen family until the late 19th century.

The house was listed on the National Register of Historic Places on June 6, 1983.

== See also ==
- National Register of Historic Places listings in Bristol County, Massachusetts
