= Anawan Rock =

- U.S. National Register of Historic Places
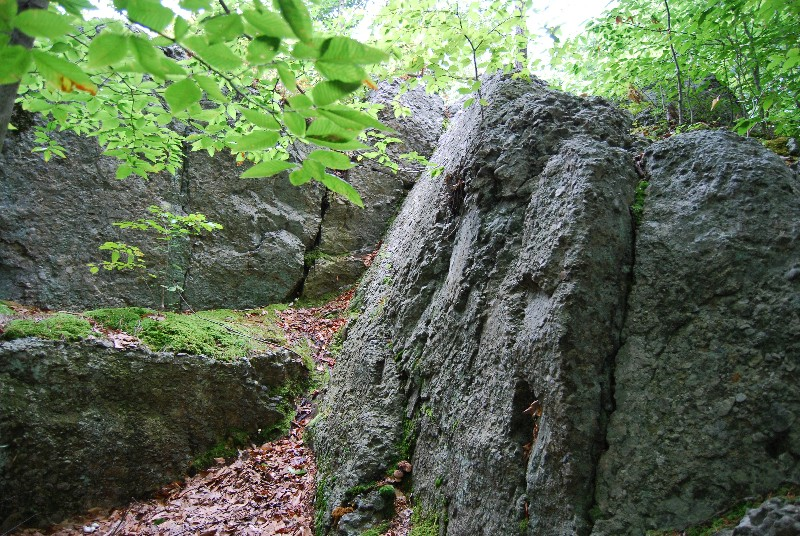

- Location within Massachusetts Location within the United States
- Location: Rehoboth, Massachusetts
- Coordinates: 41°51′54″N 71°12′52″W
- Built: 1676
- Architectural style: Large rock shaped like a dull dagger
- MPS: Rehoboth MRA
- NRHP reference No.: 83000619
- Added to NRHP: June 6, 1983

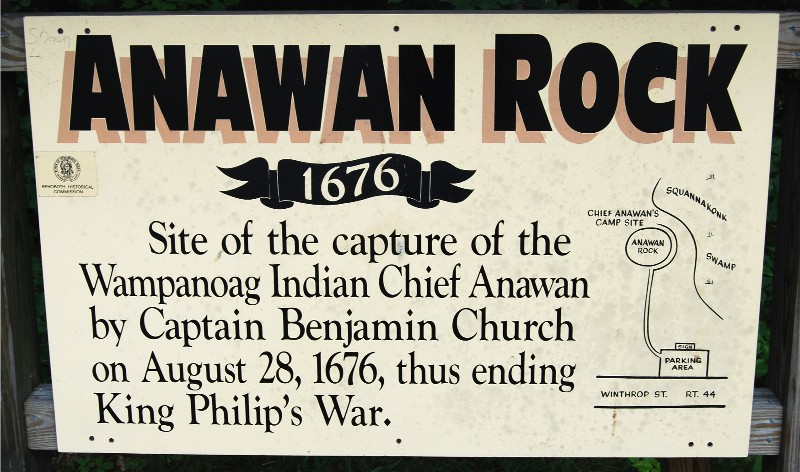
Sign at Anawan Rock Historic Site

Anawan Rock is a colonial historic site in Rehoboth, Massachusetts. It is a large dome of conglomerate rock (puddingstone) located off Winthrop Street (U.S. Route 44) in a wooded site reached by a short footpath. The site was added to the National Register of Historic Places in 1983.

== History ==
On August 28, 1676, Captain Benjamin Church and his group of colonial soldiers captured Anawan, the war chief of the Pocasset People. He was an old man at the time, and a chief captain of Metacomet, who had been captured and killed by the colonists two weeks earlier. The capture of Anawan marked the final event in King Philip's War. Although Church promised to spare Anawan's life upon his capture, he was ultimately executed by colonial officials. Anawan Rock is one of the few physical sites from the war still intact.

== See also ==
- National Register of Historic Places listings in Bristol County, Massachusetts
