= Roger Amidon =

Personal details
- Born: 1614 France
- Died: November 13, 1673 Rehoboth, Massachusetts, United States
- Spouse(s): Sarah Lynn Hutching (4 children); Joanna Harwood (3 children)

Roger Amidon (or Amadon, Amidown, Amadowne) was an early settler of the Massachusetts Bay Colony. Roger Amidon was a French Huguenot, who had arrived with John Endecott's advance company after escaping to England from the Siege of La Rochelle in 1628.

Roger was a ship's carpenter. He is first recorded at Salem, Massachusetts, where there was a flourishing shipbuilding industry in the early 17th century. On 25 December 1637 at a town meeting it was agreed that the marsh and meadow land in Salem which had been common land was to be "proportioned out unto [the inhabitants of Salem] accordingly to heads of their families -- to those that have the greatest number an acre thereof and to those that have least not above half an acre and to those that are betweene both three quarters of an acre". Roger was 89th on the list and drew half an acre of meadow land. He was the only person in his household—see History of Salem.

He was probably married around 1639 and moved to Weymouth where his daughter Sarah was baptised in 1640. Three years later the baptism of his daughter Lydia was recorded in Boston. He had at least two more children around this time, but their birth records have yet to be found. He got into some trouble in Boston and on 5 January 1644 he "was enjoined to pay 2 shillings and 6 pence fees, admonished and discharged". Not long afterwards he moved to Rehoboth (Seekonk) where in July 1648 he drew a house lot. The houses formed a semicircle around the commons and Roger's home was located at the northeastern end of the circle—see Early Rehoboth by Bowen. His last child by his wife Sarah was baptised in Rehoboth in 1652. In 1658 he took the Oath of Fidelity at Rehoboth and at a town meeting held on 22 June 1658 he participated in the drawing of meadow lots, lying on the north side of the town. The lots were drawn "according to person and estate". Roger was number 43 in a list of 49 men drawing lots—see Rehoboth Town Records. Until 1685 Plymouth Colony included the western portion of Rhode Island and for a time Roger lived in Warwick [see Land Records, A:254], which would become part of Kent County, Rhode Island.

In 1659 he was sued for neglect in Warwick by Robert Hearngton who was master of the "Barke Deborn"—see Early Records of the Town of Warwick. Roger was one of the jurors impanneled at an inquest held at Rehoboth in 1661. That year Rehoboth acquired additional land from the Indians, which would become known as the North Purchase. It contained part of the 50 acres (200,000 m^{2}) that Rehoboth had already granted Roger. His first wife Sarah died in 1668. Within months he remarried and over the next four years became the father of three more children. He died suddenly in 1673 and, due to some suspicion that he had been murdered by his wife, a coroners inquest was held on 11 November 1673. The jury found his death had been a natural one. Roger died intestate and his land was divided between his widow and surviving children:

He was one of the early settlers of Rehoboth, and the present city of Attleboro is partially on land purchased from Amidon.
