= Margaret Amidon =

American educator

Margaret M. Amidon
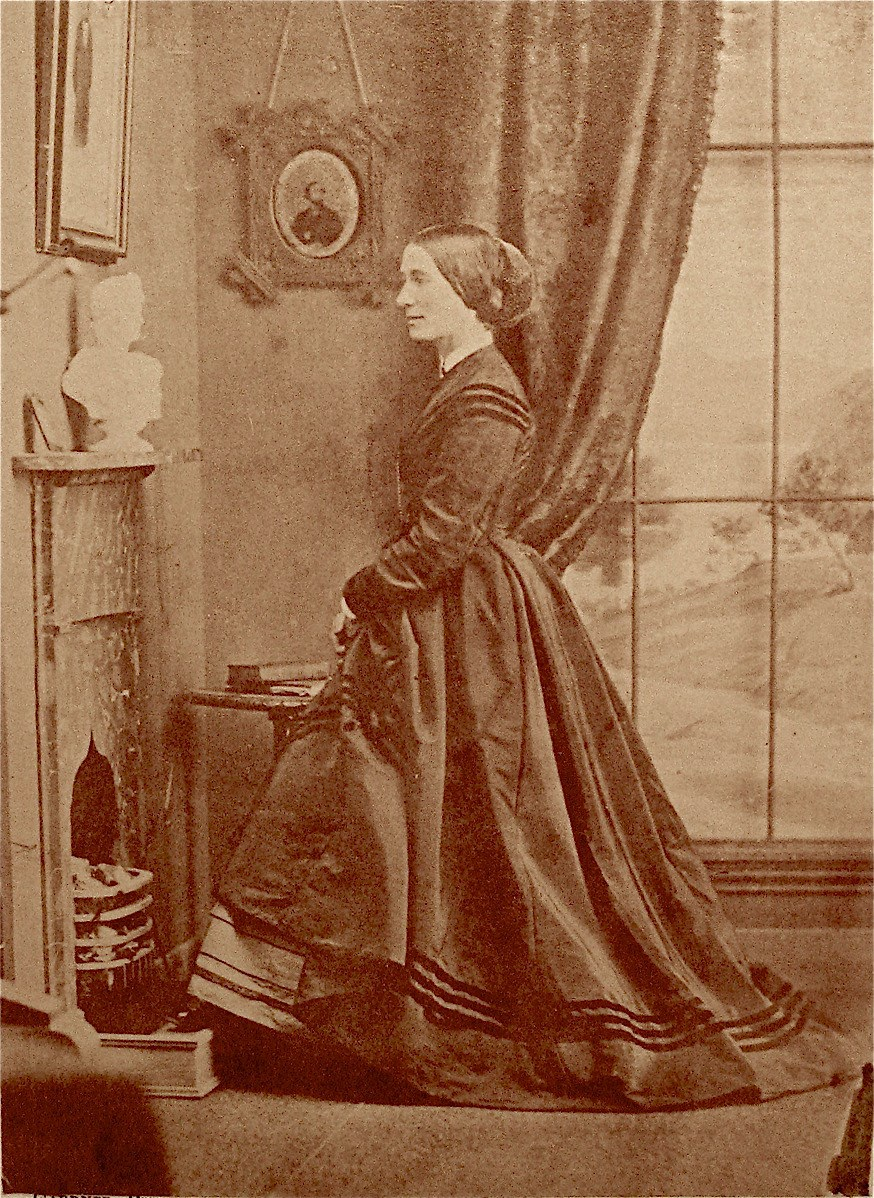
- Born: January 21, 1827; Alexandria, Virginia, US
- Died: December 3, 1869 (aged 42)

Margaret Agnes Milburn Amidon (January 21, 1827 – December 3, 1869) was a teacher and principal in Southwest Washington, D.C. She was the principal of Female Grammar School from 1854 until her death in 1869.

She was born in Alexandria, Virginia to George and Alice Milburn in 1827, the fifth of seven children. Both of her parents died before she was twelve, and she was raised by a step-mother. She was baptized into the New Jerusalem—Swedenborgian—Church. She was tutored privately and started offering her own tutoring services when she was sixteen. In 1849 she got a job working at a primary school in the fourth district of Washington, D.C., and also converted to the Baptist Church. In 1854 she was promoted to principal of a grammar school in the district where she taught girls only. On weekends she taught Sunday school. In December 1862, she married Hollis Amidon. She died in 1869 of tuberculosis. After her death a commemorative book was published: In memoriam. Proceedings commemorative of the life and services of Mrs. Margaret Milburn-Amidon, late principal of the Female grammar school in the Fourth district, Washington city, D.C.

In 1882 Amidon Elementary School was built in Southwest Washington in her honor and remained open until 1957. The Amidon Promenade and Amidon-Bowen Elementary School are named for her. In 2003 the District of Columbia Council voted to recognize June 19 as "Amidon Elementary School Graduation Ceremony Day" in Washington D.C.
