= Rehoboth, Massachusetts =

- Town
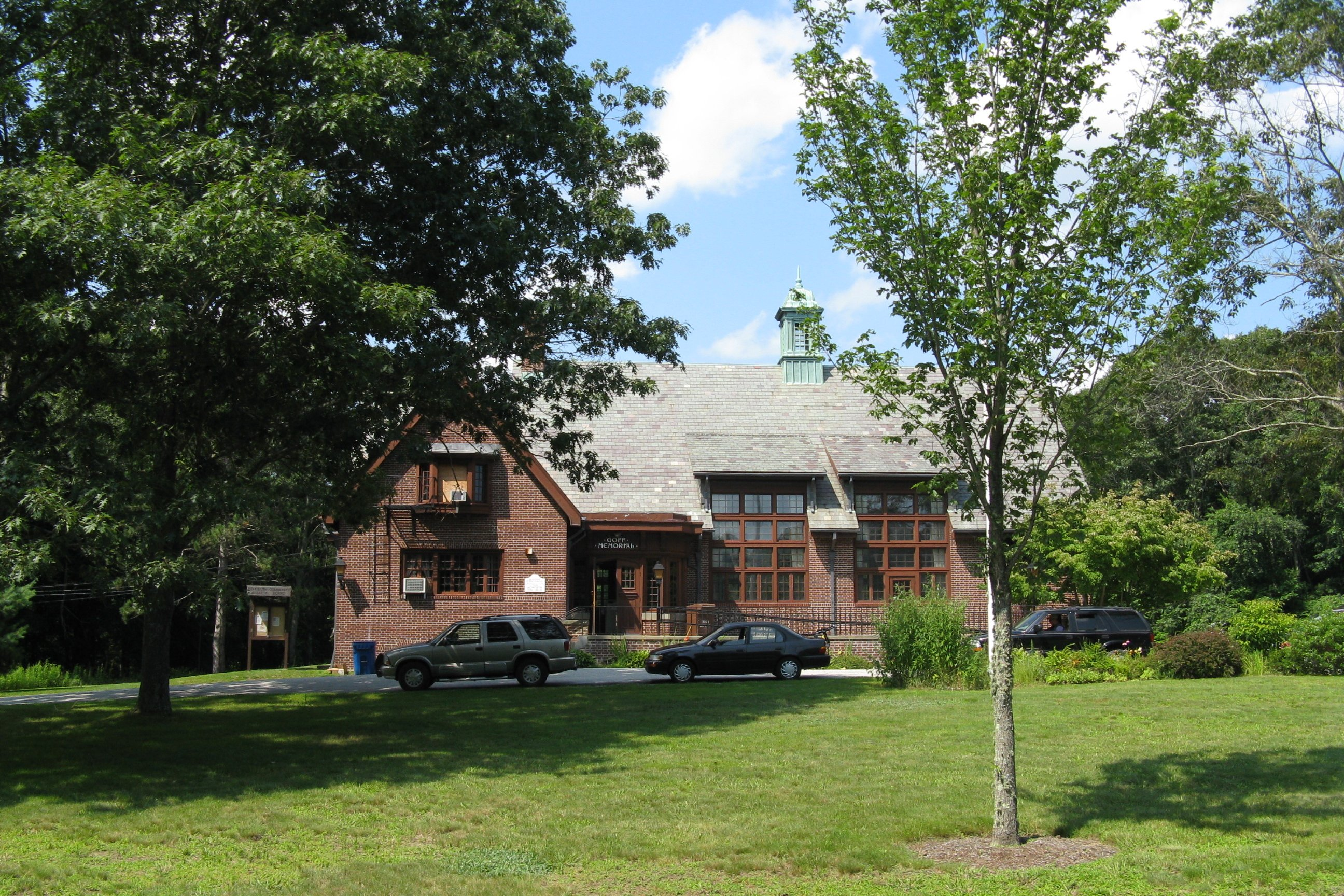
- Goff Memorial Hall

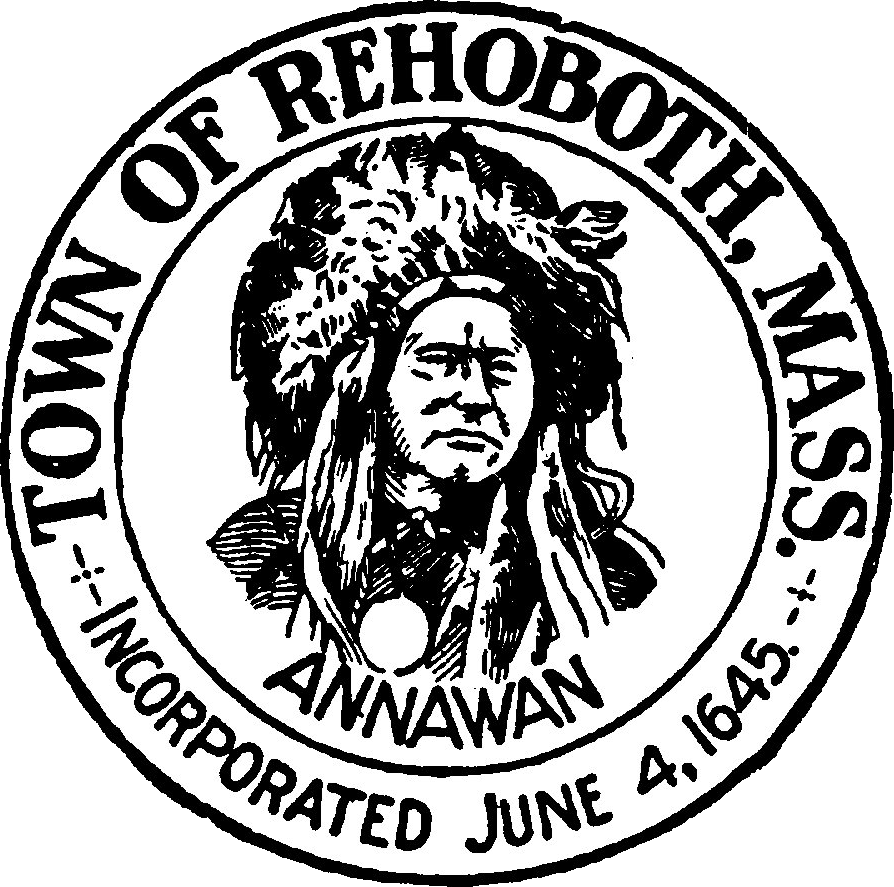
- Seal

- Location in Bristol County in Massachusetts
- Coordinates: 41°50′25″N 71°15′00″W
- Country: United States
- State: Massachusetts
- County: Bristol
- Settled: 1643
- Incorporated: 1645

Government
  - Type: Open town meeting

Area
  - Total: 46.8 sq mi (121.1 km^{2})
  - Land: 46.5 sq mi (120.4 km^{2})
  - Water: 0.27 sq mi (0.7 km^{2})
- Elevation: 49 ft (15 m)

Population (2020)
  - Total: 12,502
  - Density: 268.9/sq mi (103.8/km^{2})
- Time zone: UTC-5 (Eastern)
  - Summer (DST): UTC-4 (Eastern)
- ZIP Code: 02769
- Area code: 508/774
- FIPS code: 25-56375
- GNIS feature ID: 0619437
- Website: https://www.rehobothma.gov/

Rehoboth is a historic town in Bristol County, Massachusetts, United States. Established in 1643, Rehoboth is one of the oldest towns in Massachusetts. The population was 12,502 at the 2020 census. Rehoboth is a mostly rural community with many historic sites, including 53 historic cemeteries.

== History ==
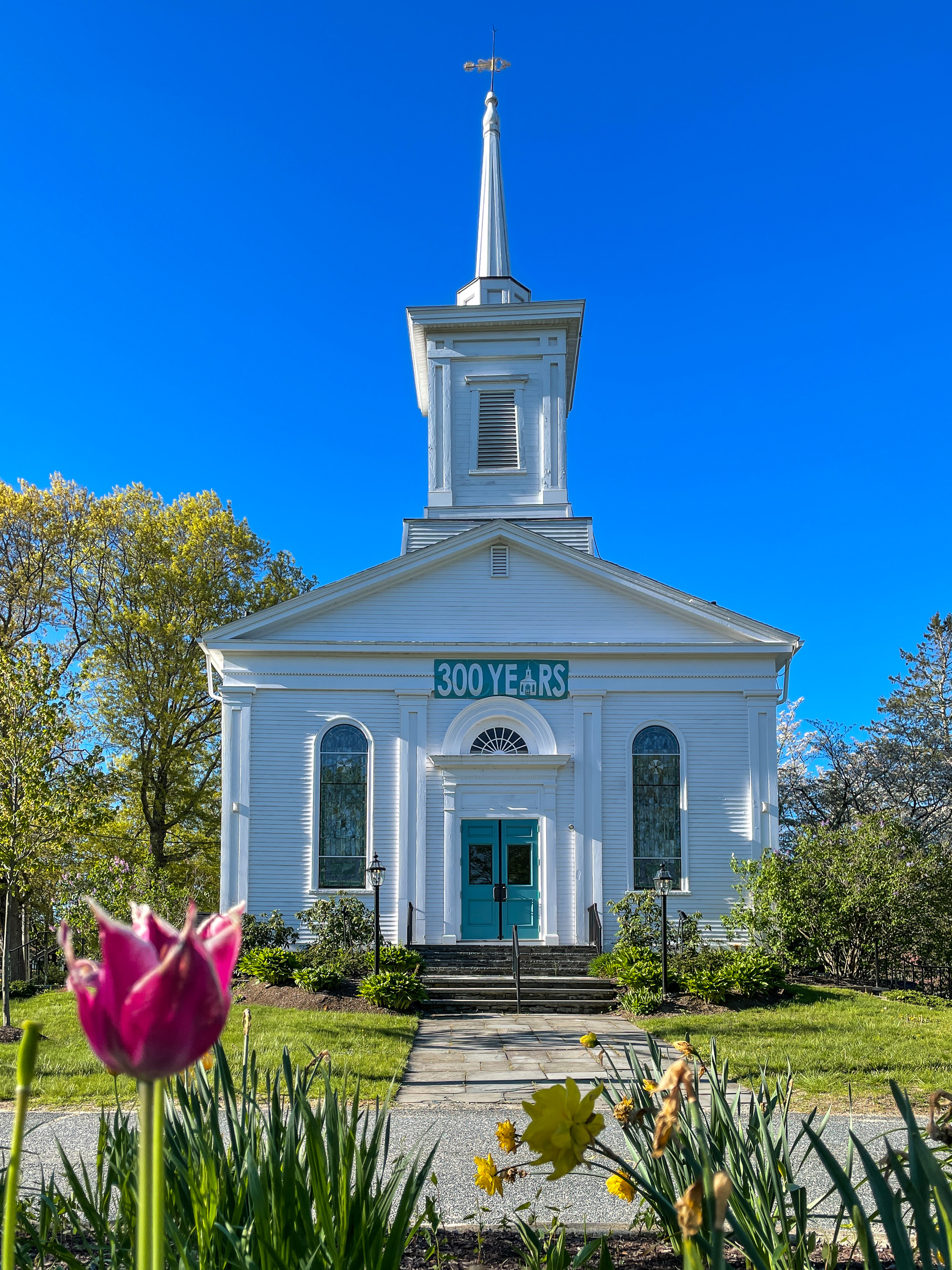
Rehoboth Congregational Church celebrated its 300th anniversary in 2021.

Rehoboth was established in 1643 by Samuel Newman (born 1602), Walter Palmer (born 1585), and William Sabin. It was incorporated in 1645, one of the earliest Massachusetts towns to be incorporated. Newman named the town Rehoboth (Gen. 26:22), the Hebrew scriptural word for "enlargement," (Broad Places) signifying the space settlers enjoyed (God has given us room).

Early Rehoboth, known as Old Rehoboth, included all of what is now Seekonk, Massachusetts, and East Providence, Rhode Island, as well as parts of the nearby communities of Attleboro, North Attleborough, Swansea, and Somerset in Massachusetts, and Barrington, Bristol, Warren, Pawtucket, Cumberland, and Woonsocket in Rhode Island. The town was and still is a site of a crossroads which help to serve Taunton, Providence, Fall River and points to the north.

One of the founding fathers of Rehoboth was Samuel Newman, a clergyman from Weymouth, Massachusetts who moved to the Sakonnet area near to Little Compton in the Plymouth Colony. Samuel Newman and his followers migrated north and established a huge town common in what is now Rumford, Rhode Island. They gave the roundabout a distinctive name: "The Ring of the Green." Newman Congregational Church (founded 1643, current building dates to 1810) still stands at the intersections of Pawtucket Ave, Newman Ave and Ferris Ave. The area was known as Rehoboth village. Somewhat of a celebrity, Newman's famous bible concordance (the third ever printed in English) had just been published in London. He spent the next few years revising the concordance with a second edition published in 1650 that includes on the title page, "By Samuel Newman, now teacher of the Church at Rehoboth in New England." According to legend, he worked on the revisions by burning pine knots instead of candles. The concordance, later called the Cambridge Concordance, was reprinted as late as 1889, almost 250 years after it was first published by the founder of Rehoboth.

The Rehoboth Carpenter family was one of the founding families. Among the earliest purchasers of the land that is now Rehoboth and nearby communities was the Peck family, who came from nearby Hingham, Massachusetts, initially. Joseph Peck, the brother of the Rev. Robert Peck,[4] the disaffected Puritan who had fled his Hingham church in England, after the crackdown by Archbishop Laud, had purchased sizable tracts of lands from the Native Americans. Peck's son was fined fifty shillings for making continuous sexual advances toward the maid. Peck died in Rehoboth in 1697. These tracts of land Peck willed to his son Samuel, who served as Deputy to the General Court at Plymouth, as well as the first representative from the town of Rehoboth after the Plymouth Colony and Massachusetts were united. The family continued to live in the area through the twentieth century. Today's Pecks Corner in Rehoboth is named for this early Puritan family.

=== King Philip's War (1675–1676) ===
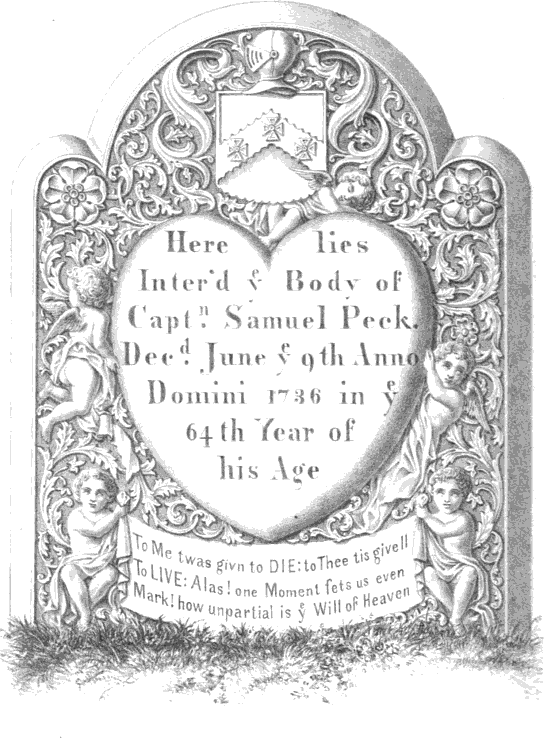
Headstone of Capt. Samuel Peck, son of Joseph Peck, one of the original settlers of Rehoboth. Peck Burial Yard, Historic Cemetery #13

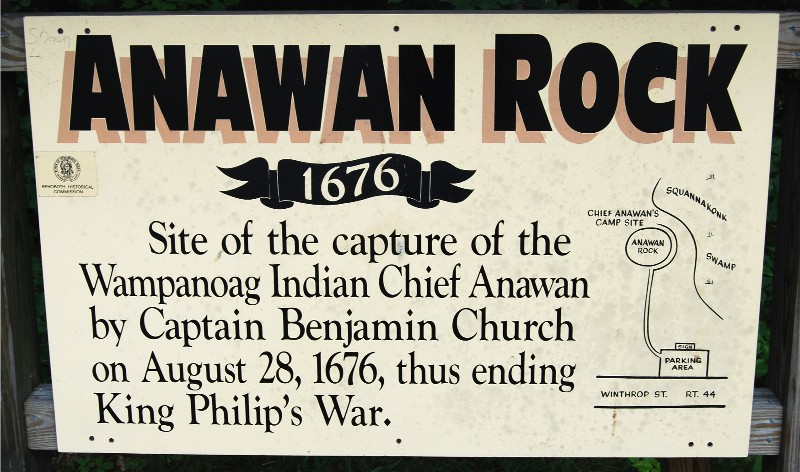
Sign at Anawan Rock Historic Site

Rehoboth was a significant site during King Philip's War. On June 30, 1675, King Philip led a small force in a surprise attack against the undefended settlement, killing settlers, burning houses, and causing residents to live in constant fear of attack.

On March 28, 1676, Canonchet led the Narragansetts in a second attack, destroying 42 homes, 21 barns, corn mills and a sawmill.

On August 28, 1676, Captain Benjamin Church surrounded and captured Anawan, a Wampanoag sachem who had become chief upon the death of King Philip two weeks earlier. The Wampanoags had taken a position above Squannakonk Swamp to hide from the colonists. Church's capture and execution of Anawan effectively ended the campaigns in southeastern Massachusetts of King Philip's War. Anawan Rock, a large puddingstone, still marks the location. Although a desolate place at the time, the rock is not far off modern-day Route 44.

=== Public education ===
Rehoboth is the birthplace of public education in North America. Upon incorporation, members of the Rehoboth community and Newman Church (in present-day East Providence, Rhode Island) elected to collect funds to pay a teacher for the settlement's children. Church and government were closely tied in early colonial villages, so the word 'public' refers instead to access to education by all children in the community, not just those of wealthy parents. Another town landmark is related to education: The historic Hornbine School, built in 1845, is located in the southeast corner of town and is open to the public for visiting and educational purposes from May to September.

=== 350th anniversary ===
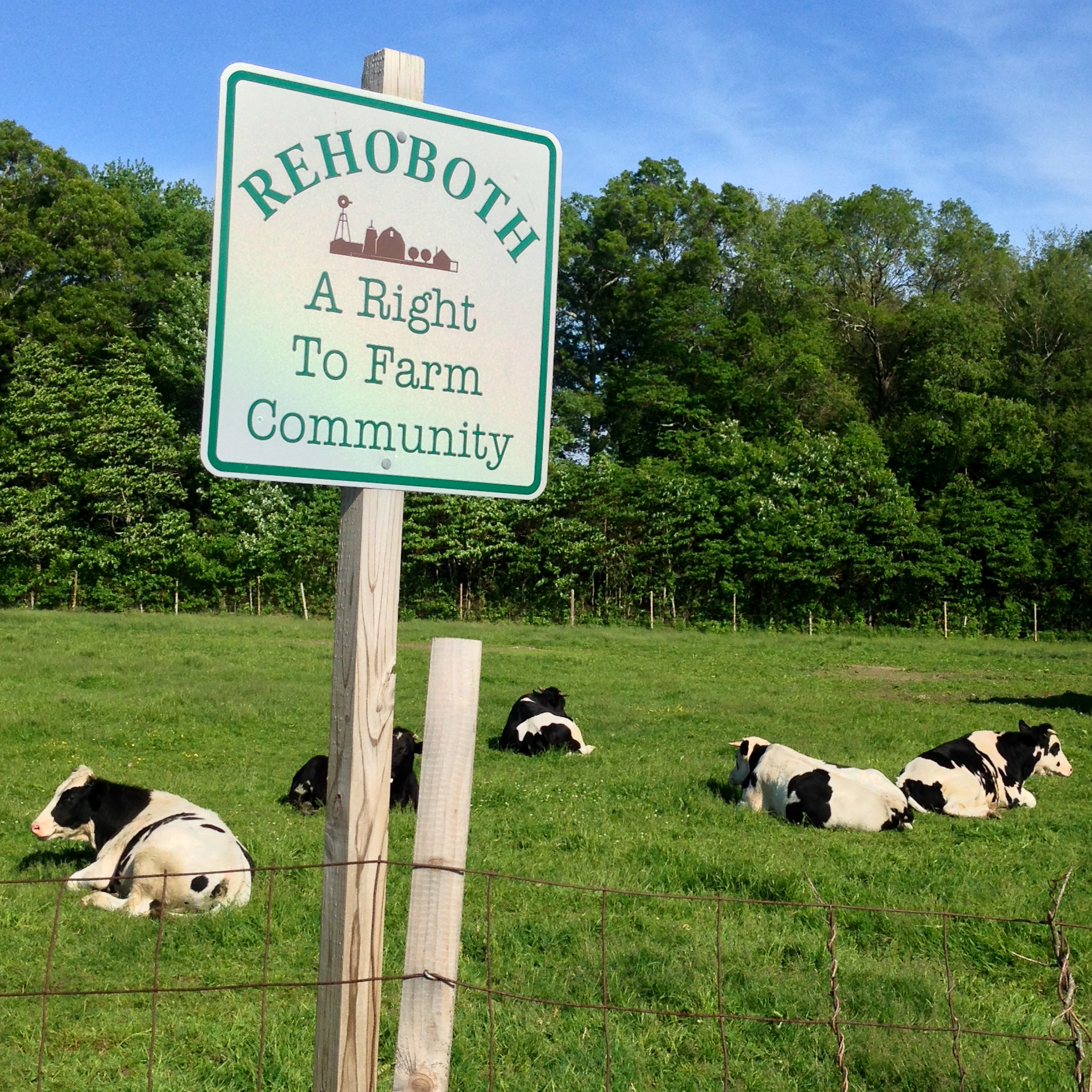
Rehoboth is a Right to Farm community

For the town's 350th anniversary in 1992, the town conducted a promotional "take back" of the communities that were once the original Rehoboth. With encouragement from musket-bearing members of the 13th Continental Regiment, Rehoboth Minutemen, other towns and cities ceremonially 'returned' their land for the duration of the anniversary year celebration.

=== Historic places ===
- Anawan Rock
- Briggs Tavern, (1780)
- Brown House (1700)
- Col. Thomas Carpenter III House (1755)
- Carpenter House (1789)
- Hornbine Baptist Church (1753)
- Martin Farm (1750)
- Nathan Bowen House
- Sylvester Round House (Rehoboth, Massachusetts) (1782) site of R.Round Tavern (1810) & Grenville Stephens' store & first post office in Rehoboth, MA

== Geography ==
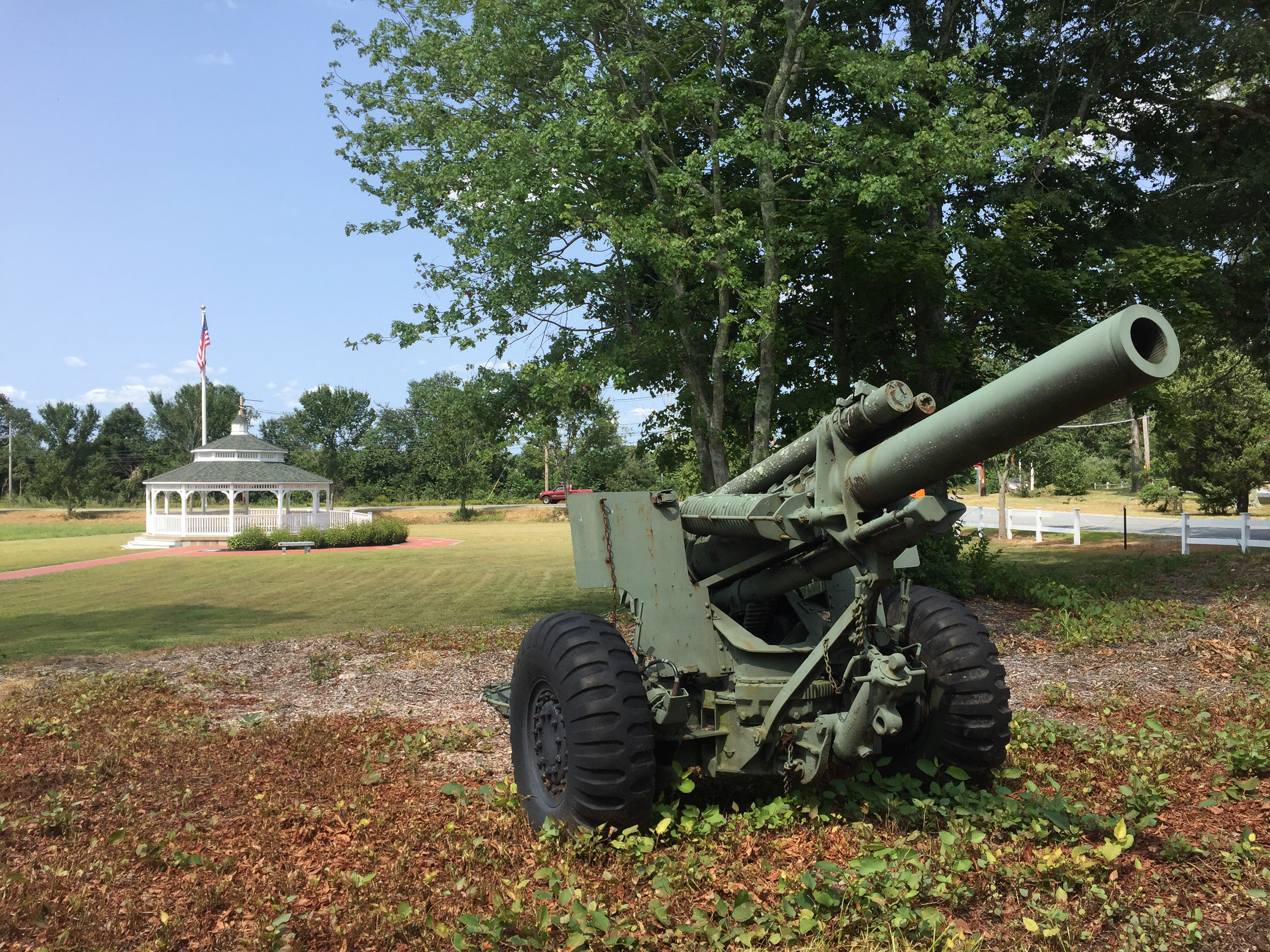
Redway Plain, at Route 44 and Bay State Road

According to the U.S. Census Bureau, the town has a total area of 46.8 square miles (121 km^{2}), of which 46.5 square miles (120 km^{2}) is land and 0.3 square miles (0.78 km^{2}), or 0.60%, is water. Much of the land is hilly and swampy, with most of its brooks and swamps feeding into the Palmer River, which empties into Narragansett Bay to the south.

Rehoboth shares its entire western border with Seekonk. It is also bordered by Attleboro and Norton to the north, Taunton and Dighton to the east, and Swansea to the south and southeast. Rehoboth's localities are Four Corners, Hornbine, Kingmans Corner, North Rehoboth, Pecks Corner, Perrys Corner, Perryville, Rehoboth Village, South Rehoboth and Anawan Rock. The town is located 11 miles (18 km) east of Providence, Rhode Island and 50 miles (80 km) south of Boston.

== Conservation areas ==
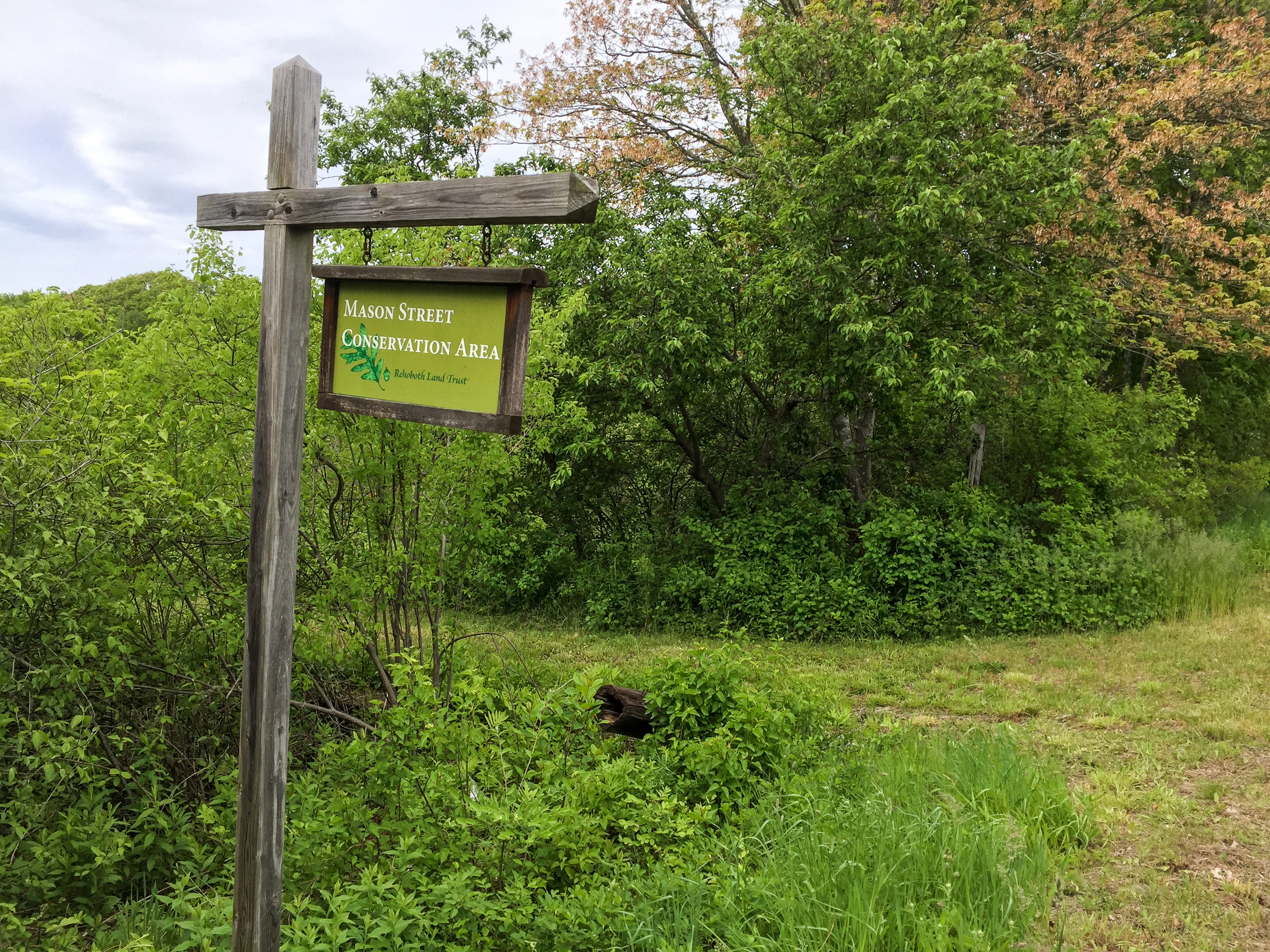
Mason Street Conservation Area is 12-acre property along the Palmer River, managed by the Rehoboth Land Trust.

- Rehoboth State Forest off Peck Street has hiking trails.
- The Ephraim Hunt Ministerial Land Conservation Area, 55 Pond Street
- The Mason Street Conservation Area (open to the public) is located off Mason Street.
- Shad Factory Conservation Area on Reed Street has hiking trails.
- Miller Bird Sanctuary, 88 Winter Street
- Fox Lea, 67 River Street
- Redway Plain, off Route 44 and Bay State Road
- Warren Upper Reservoir, off Reservoir Street

== Demographics ==
Historical population
Year	Pop.	±%
1790	4,710	—
1850	2,104	−55.3%
1860	1,932	−8.2%
1870	1,895	−1.9%
1880	1,891	−0.2%
1890	1,786	−5.6%
1900	1,840	+3.0%
1910	2,001	+8.7%
1920	2,065	+3.2%
1930	2,610	+26.4%
1940	2,736	+4.8%
1950	3,700	+35.2%
1960	4,953	+33.9%
1970	6,512	+31.5%
1980	7,570	+16.2%
1990	8,656	+14.3%
2000	10,172	+17.5%
2010	11,608	+14.1%
2020	12,502	+7.7%
2024*	13,537	+8.3%
Source: United States census records and Population Estimates Program data.

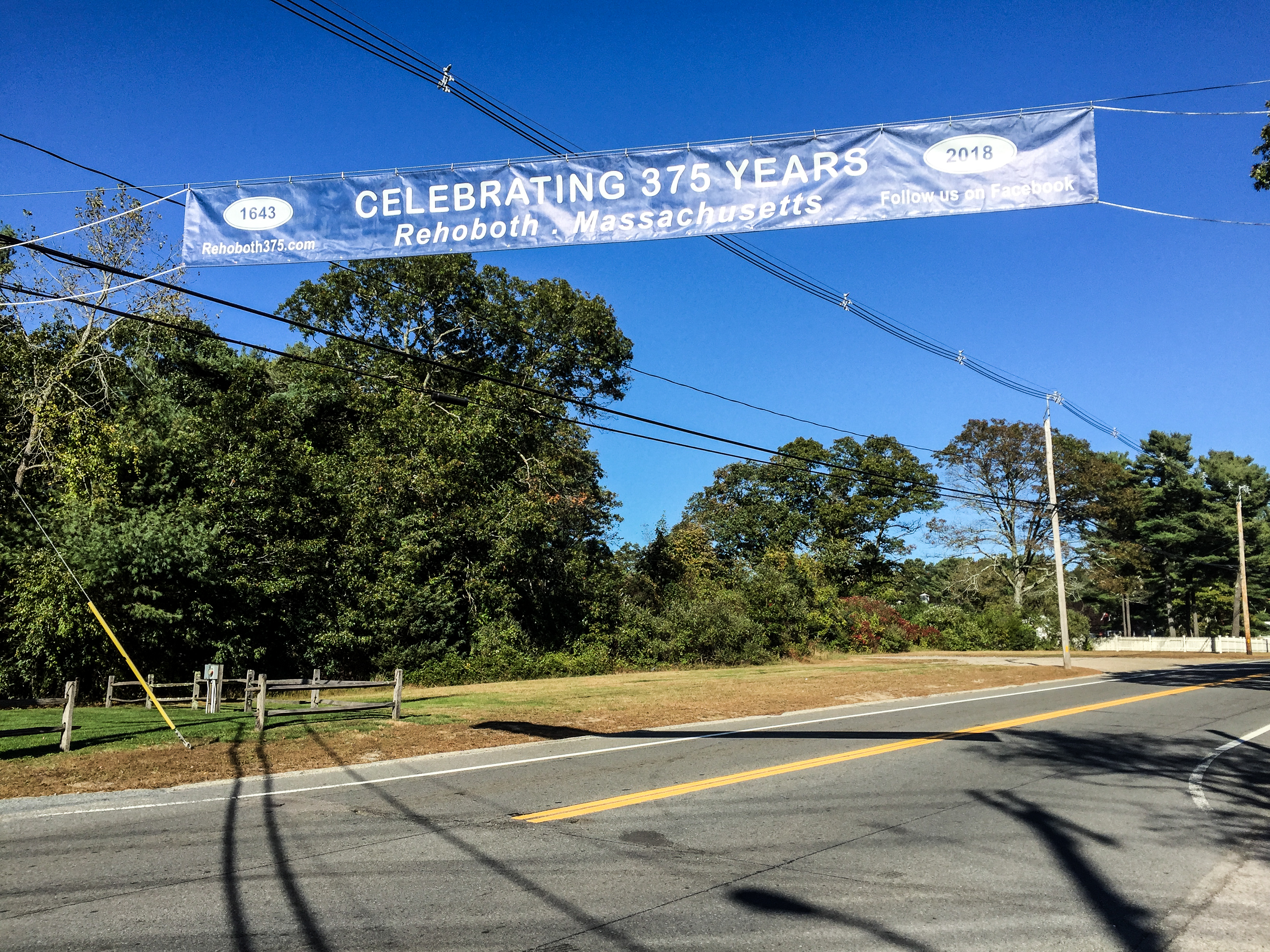
This banner across U.S. Route Route 44 commemorates the town's 375th anniversary in 2018.

As of the census of 2000, there were 10,172 people, 3,523 households, and 2,871 families residing in the town. The population density was 218.8 inhabitants per square mile (84.5/km^{2}). There were 3,597 housing units at an average density of 77.4 per square mile (29.9/km^{2}). The racial makeup of the town was 97.70% White, 0.35% African American, 0.30% Native American, 0.52% Asian, 0.01% Pacific Islander, 0.26% from other races, and 0.86% from two or more races. Hispanic or Latino of any race were 0.50% of the population. The leading ancestries reported by Rehoboth residents are 17% Irish, 17% English, 16% Portuguese and 11% French.

There were 3,523 households, out of which 37.8% had children under the age of 18 living with them, 70.8% were married couples living together, 7.4% had a female householder with no husband present, and 18.5% were non-families. Of all households, 14.1% were made up of individuals, and 5.0% had someone living alone who was 65 years of age or older. The average household size was 2.89 and the average family size was 3.20.

In the town, the population was spread out, with 26.2% under the age of 18, 6.1% from 18 to 24, 29.6% from 25 to 44, 28.2% from 45 to 64, and 10.0% who were 65 years of age or older. The median age was 39 years. For every 100 females, there were 98.2 males. For every 100 females age 18 and over, there were 95.2 males.

The median income for a household in the town was $65,373, and the median income for a family was $71,992. Males had a median income of $45,557 versus $32,445 for females. The per capita income for the town was $26,467. About 2.1% of families and 3.1% of the population were below the poverty line, including 2.7% of those under age 18 and 7.4% of those age 65 or over.

== Arts and culture ==
The Rehoboth Antiquarian Society (RAS) operates both the Carpenter Museum located on Locust Street, and Blanding Free Public Library housed in Goff Memorial Hall located on Bay State Road. The RAS hosts cultural events including Arts in the Village at Goff Memorial Hall, a classical concert series featuring world-class artists.

The Carpenter Museum hosts several annual events including the Folk Art & Artisans Show in November and many other events held throughout the year. In 2013, the museum was awarded the Gold Star Award by the Massachusetts Cultural Council for their 2012 multi-event cultural program, "Remembering Rehoboth School Days." The antiquarian society hosts a yearly Clam Bake each summer, a traditional that began in 1884, behind Goff Memorial Hall.

Blanding Free Public Library hosts events and programs for children and adults throughout the year. The Blanding Book Club meets monthly. Programs are offered for children, from pre-schoolers up, including reading, arts/crafts, summer programs, performances, visiting exhibits and other special events.

Many cultural events held in Rehoboth are supported in part by grants from the Rehoboth Cultural Council, an affiliate of the Massachusetts Cultural Council. Members of the council, although appointed by town selectmen, operate independently from town government and award grants on a yearly basis with funds allotted by the state organization. Several non-profit organizations based in Rehoboth provide resources or cultural events.

The Rehoboth Country Dance Society, founded in 1981, holds public contra dances with acclaimed musicians and callers at least twice monthly at Goff Memorial Hall. A monthly community dance is held on a Sunday evening with the Sunday Night Jammers, also at Goff Memorial Hall.

For those interested in history, the 13th Continental Regiment Rehoboth Minute Company, originally chartered in 1774, was recommissioned in 1992 as part of the town's 350 anniversary celebration. It was incorporated three years later as a non-profit, educational organization. The present recreated group portrays the original 1774 unit in civilian dress, accoutrements and firearms. Men, women and children participate in the unit as musketmen, drummers, fifers and assorted characters. The well-known group of re-enactors are invited to participate in parades, ceremonies, encampments, and battle re-enactments, as well as visiting schools throughout the region.

Each September, the town events committee hosts the Annual 'Larry Procopio' Harvest Block Party, a free event held on the Redway Plain field off Route 44. The event was named after the late Larry Procopio, an active member of the community who first organized the yearly event.

The town's historic one-room school house, the Hornbine School, is open spring and summer for visits and tours. The school, operated from 1848 to 1937, was restored in 1969 and now belongs to the town under the jurisdiction of the historical commission, and tended carefully by the non-profit Horbine School Association.

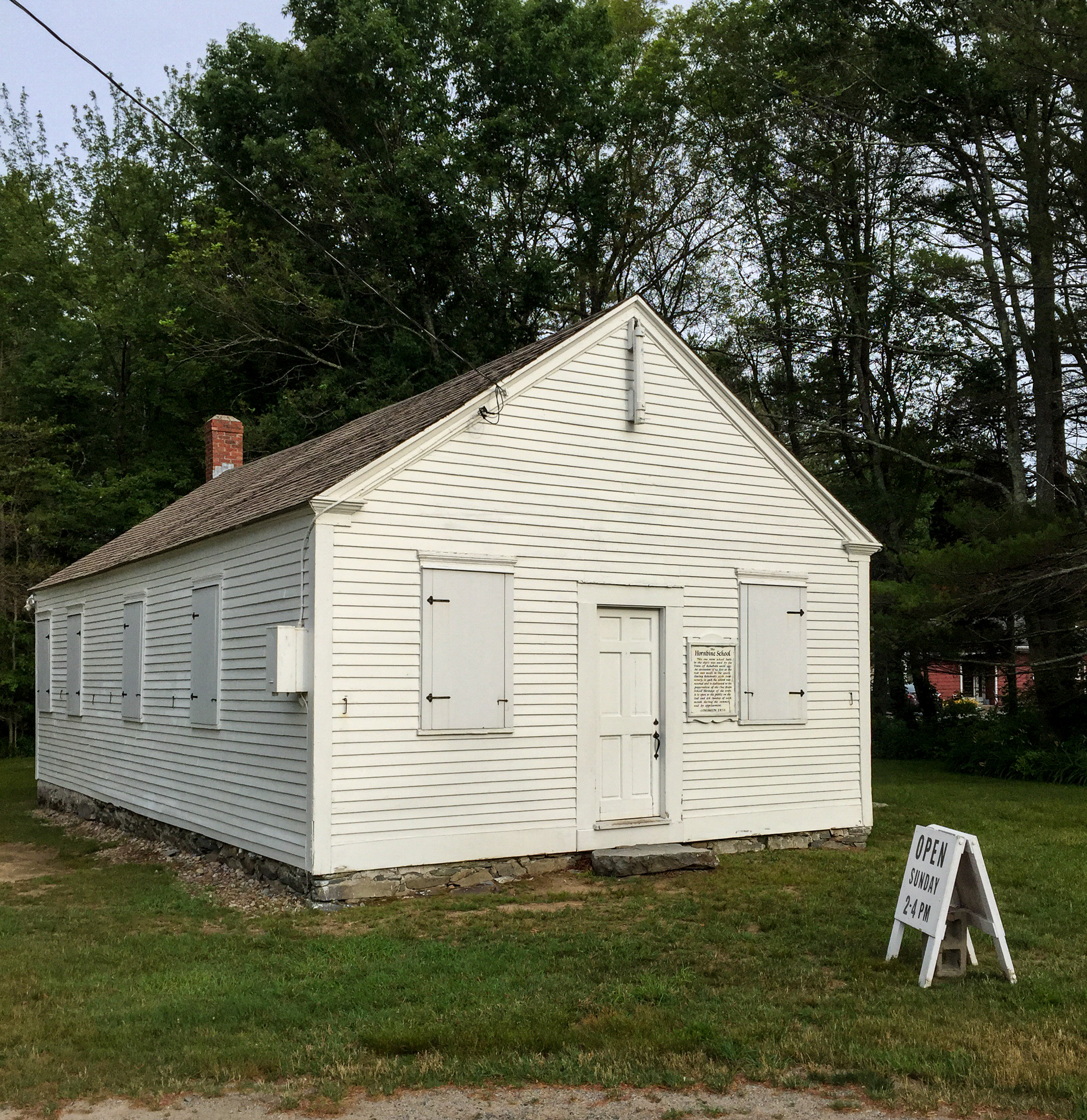
Hornbine School

== Government ==
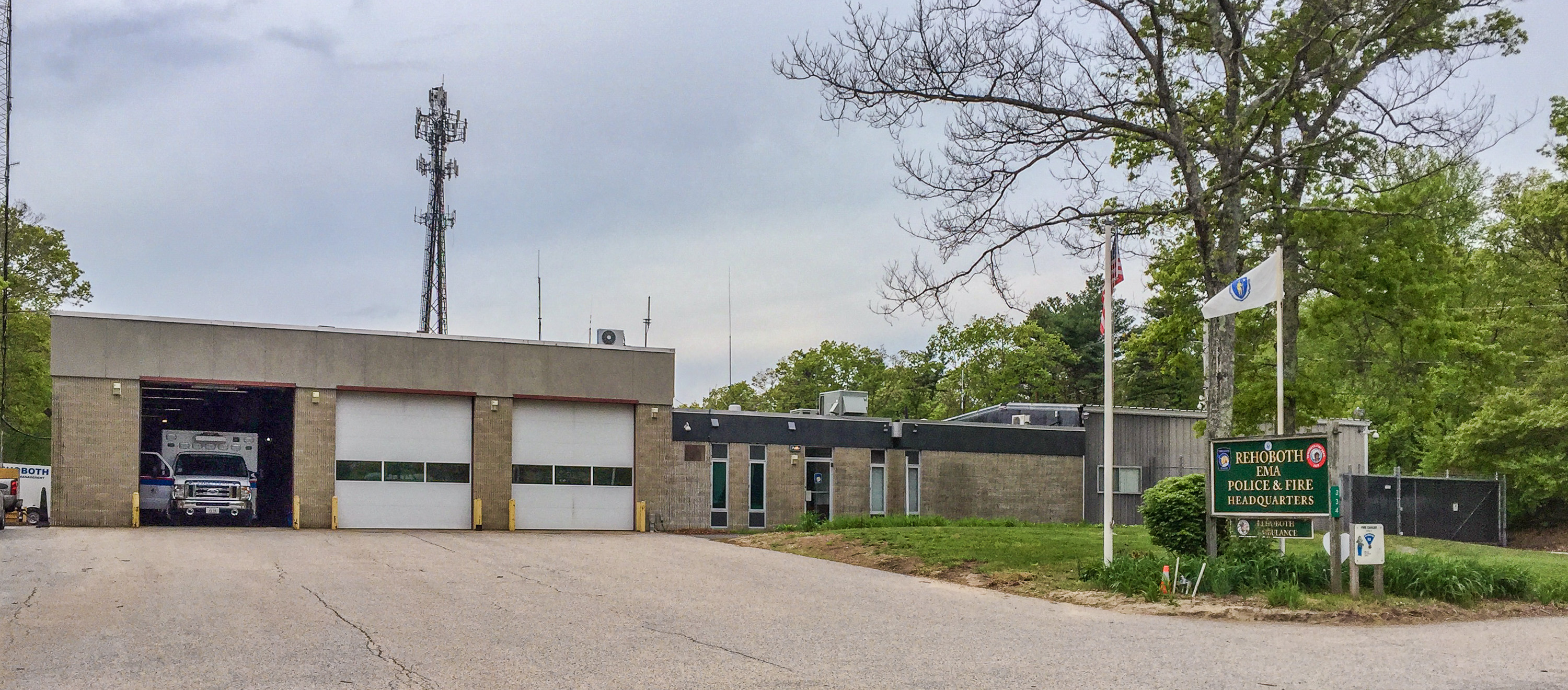
Police and Fire station on Anawan Street

The town is part of the Fourth Bristol state representative district, including Seekonk and parts of Swansea and Norton. In the state senate, the town is part of the Bristol and Norfolk district, which includes part of the city of Attleboro and all or part of the towns of Dover, Foxborough, Mansfield, Medfield, Norton, Seekonk, Sharon and Walpole. Rehoboth is patrolled by Troop D (Southeast District), 4th Barracks (located in Middleborough) of the Massachusetts State Police. On the national level, the town is part of Massachusetts's 4th congressional district, which is represented by Jake Auchincloss. The state's senators are: Ed Markey, and Elizabeth Warren.

Rehoboth municipal government operates from town offices located at 340 Anawan Street; the land and building was purchased for $995,000 after voters approved a warrant article in May 2021, with offices relocated to the structure shortly thereafter. The former town hall complex was located in a one-story building on Peck Street, previously a Project Nike site, which is now used for storage.

Municipal government is overseen by a five-member board of selectmen and a town administrator. Residents may vote on town governing issues at town meetings which are held in the spring and fall. The current board of selectmen consists of: Frederick "Skip" Vadnais (chair), Michael Diegnan and George Solas with two vacant seats.

The town has a central police and fire station (Public Safety Building) on Anawan Street (Route 118). There are two additional fire stations: North Station (#2) located on Tremont Street; South Station (#3) located on Pleasant Street. The RFD is an on-call department with trained firefighters. Only the fire chief is a full-time employee of the town. The Rehoboth Rescue Squad has served the community for the past 46 years and is the town's only 100% unpaid volunteer public safety organization. Rehoboth Ambulance is an independent, non-profit organization that provides vehicles, equipment, supplies and staffing stipends without direct funding from the town. In cases of emergency or disaster, the Rehoboth Emergency Management Agency (REMA) coordinates efforts of all the public safety entities. The Highway Department and Forestry service is located down the road from police/fire headquarters.

An additional town-owned building, located on Anawan Street, houses Rehoboth Community TV, the local public access cable television service. Operation of public programming on three channels (Government Channel 9, Education Channel 15 and Public Channel 98) is the responsibility of the town's Cable Advisory Committee and town employees. Some municipal meetings are broadcast live while others are recorded and broadcast at various times.

The town owned the Gladys L. Hurrell Senior Center located on Bay State Road. The building was used for municipal meetings, private and public events, until it was destroyed in a fire in September 2020.

Military veterans in Rehoboth are supported by the town's Veterans Services Department located at the town office. The Veteran's agent Jake Kramer works with veterans of all ages to help them access services. In 2012, residents voted at town meeting to adopt provisions of the Massachusetts Valor Act so that local veterans can perform municipal work to offset their property tax bills.

Rehoboth is one of the more conservative towns in the state. It has consistently voted for Republicans since 2012, and the last Democrat to carry the town in a presidential election is Barack Obama in the 2008 election.

Rehoboth presidential election results
Year	Democratic	Republican	Third parties	Total Votes	Margin
2024	42.70% 3,455	55.60% 4,501	1.40% 120	7,956	13.90%
2020	46.10% 3,650	51.48% 4,076	2.41% 191	7,917	5.38%
2016	40.98% 2,784	52.61% 3,574	6.40% 435	6,793	11.63%
2012	46.55% 2,914	51.87% 3,247	1.58% 99	6,260	5.32%
2008	50.59% 3,147	47.35% 2,945	2.06% 128	6,220	3.25%
2004	51.38% 2,886	47.39% 2,662	1.23% 69	5,617	3.99%
2000	50.35% 2,452	41.27% 2,010	8.38% 408	4,870	9.08%
1996	49.84% 2,156	35.46% 1,534	14.70% 636	4,326	14.38%
1992	36.64% 1,652	32.20% 1,452	31.16% 1,405	4,509	4.44%
1988	45.11% 1,811	53.80% 2,160	1.10% 44	4,015	8.69%
1984	37.28% 1,244	62.24% 2,077	0.48% 16	3,337	24.96%
1980	33.31% 1,118	48.18% 1,617	18.50% 621	3,356	14.87%
1976	47.30% 1,479	49.82% 1,558	2.88% 90	3,127	2.53%
1972	39.15% 1,131	59.92% 1,731	0.93% 27	2,889	20.77%
1968	45.58% 1,093	48.62% 1,166	5.80% 139	2,398	3.04%
1964	65.77% 1,435	33.59% 733	0.64% 14	2,182	32.17%
1960	41.89% 950	58.07% 1,317	0.04% 1	2,268	16.18%
1956	21.21% 416	78.33% 1,536	0.46% 9	1,961	57.11%
1952	26.58% 491	73.25% 1,353	0.16% 3	1,847	46.67%
1948	33.96% 473	64.47% 898	1.58% 22	1,393	30.51%
1944	32.84% 419	67.01% 855	0.16% 2	1,276	34.17%
1940	37.12% 503	62.73% 850	0.15% 2	1,355	25.61%

== Education ==
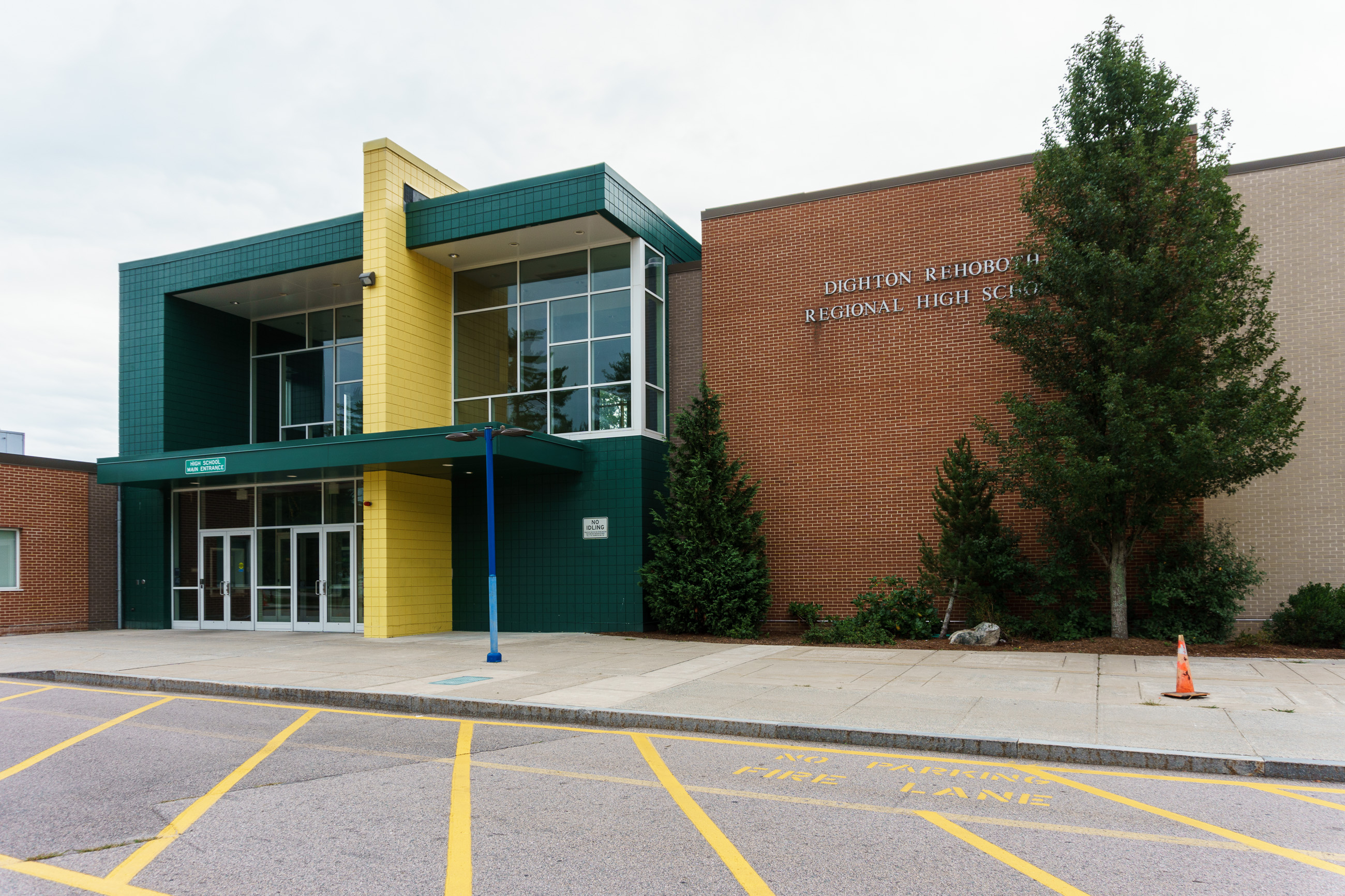
Dighton-Rehoboth Regional High School

Rehoboth's educational system can be traced back to the earliest days of the town (see "History" for more details). The Dighton-Rehoboth Regional School District was formed in 1958 and expanded to include all schools in both Rehoboth and neighboring Dighton.

Rehoboth schools include Palmer River Elementary School on Winthrop Street (Route 44) and D. L. Beckwith Middle School, adjacent to the elementary school. Both schools offer special education to students with an Individualized Education Program. The Rehoboth Parent-Teacher-Student Association (PTSA) serves both students of both schools. Dighton-Rehoboth Regional High School, located in North Dighton, provides AP, Honors, college preparatory and career-technical education (CTE). The school also supports a transition program for special education students from 18 to 22 to continue academics and pursue vocational interests while concentrating on independent living skills.

The athletics teams of Dighton-Rehoboth Regional High School (the "Falcons") participate in the South Coast Conference (SCC) of the Massachusetts Interscholastic Athletic Association (MIAA). Sports include cheerleading, cross-country, soccer, football, volleyball, baseball, softball, basketball, golf, field hockey, indoor track, outdoor track, tennis, wrestling, lacrosse and swimming.

The Dighton-Rehoboth Marching Band (DRMB) is a large organization of students that performs for athletic games, parades and special events such as the annual Dighton Christmas Tree Lighting and Rehoboth's Harvest Block Party. From 1992 until 2014, the band was led and run by band director Doug Kelley. Under Kelley's direction, programming for the band was greatly expanded to include elaborately themed theatrical half time shows (notably "Star Trek" in 2009, "Cirque du Solei" in 2010, "Jekyll and Hyde" in 2011, "Mask of Zorro" in 2012, and "Fantasmic" in 2013), competing in annual New England Scholastic Band Association (NESBA) competitions, opening for rock band The Who in 2009, participating in UMass Band Day (a large scale, New England-based marching band event hosted by the University of Massachusetts Amherst Marching Band), playing on radio stations WHJY and WROR, performing as Tom Brady’s marching band for several years at the Best Buddies Football Challenge in Boston, and being selected as the marching band to represent Massachusetts in the 2014 Washington, DC 4th of July parade. Spearheaded by Kelley's efforts, the DRMB's expanded programming during this time increased participation in the DRMB to nearly 200 participants across both its band and color guard. In 2014, Kelley left his position as the band director to work as Dighton-Rehoboth Regional High School's Athletic Director, which oversees the DRMB in addition to all athletic programs. Kelley retired from Dighton-Rehoboth Regional High School in 2024. After Kelley left his position as band director, a year and a half long transition period took place. At the end of the 2015-2016 school year, a replacement for Kelley had been found. On July 7th, 2016, DRMB alum, Joseph Botelho took over as the band director for the DRMB. Botelho also works as a music teacher at Dighton-Rehoboth Regional High School. Despite many challenges, including school district administration turn over, funding restructuring for the school district, and the COVID-19 epidemic, Botelho has managed to continue running many of the same programs Kelley had and has maintained a stable membership in the DRMB. During Kelley's tenure as band director, the band's travels, equipment and events were supported by the Friends of D-R Marching Band, a nonprofit run by parents that conducted fundraising efforts throughout the year. In 2016, the Friends of the D-R Marching Band came under fire after tax returns from 2014 did not match invoices and expense documentation for that year. Fundraising efforts are currently conducted by DRMB Boosters, a 501(c)3 nonprofit organization run by volunteers that have close ties to the marching band's members. The DRMB Boosters offers more transparency in its fundraising and spending of revenue than its predecessor. As of 2025, the DRMB consists of about 60 members across its band and color guard.

The school district has a cooperative agreement with Bristol Plymouth Regional Technical School for those high school students wishing to attend a vocational-technical school. Rehoboth students may also elect to attend Bristol County Agricultural High School in Dighton.

Rehoboth has two private elementary schools: Cedar Brook School, a Seventh-day Adventist school serving students from grades Pre-K–10; and the Pinecroft School serving students from K–5.

== Infrastructure ==
=== Transportation ===
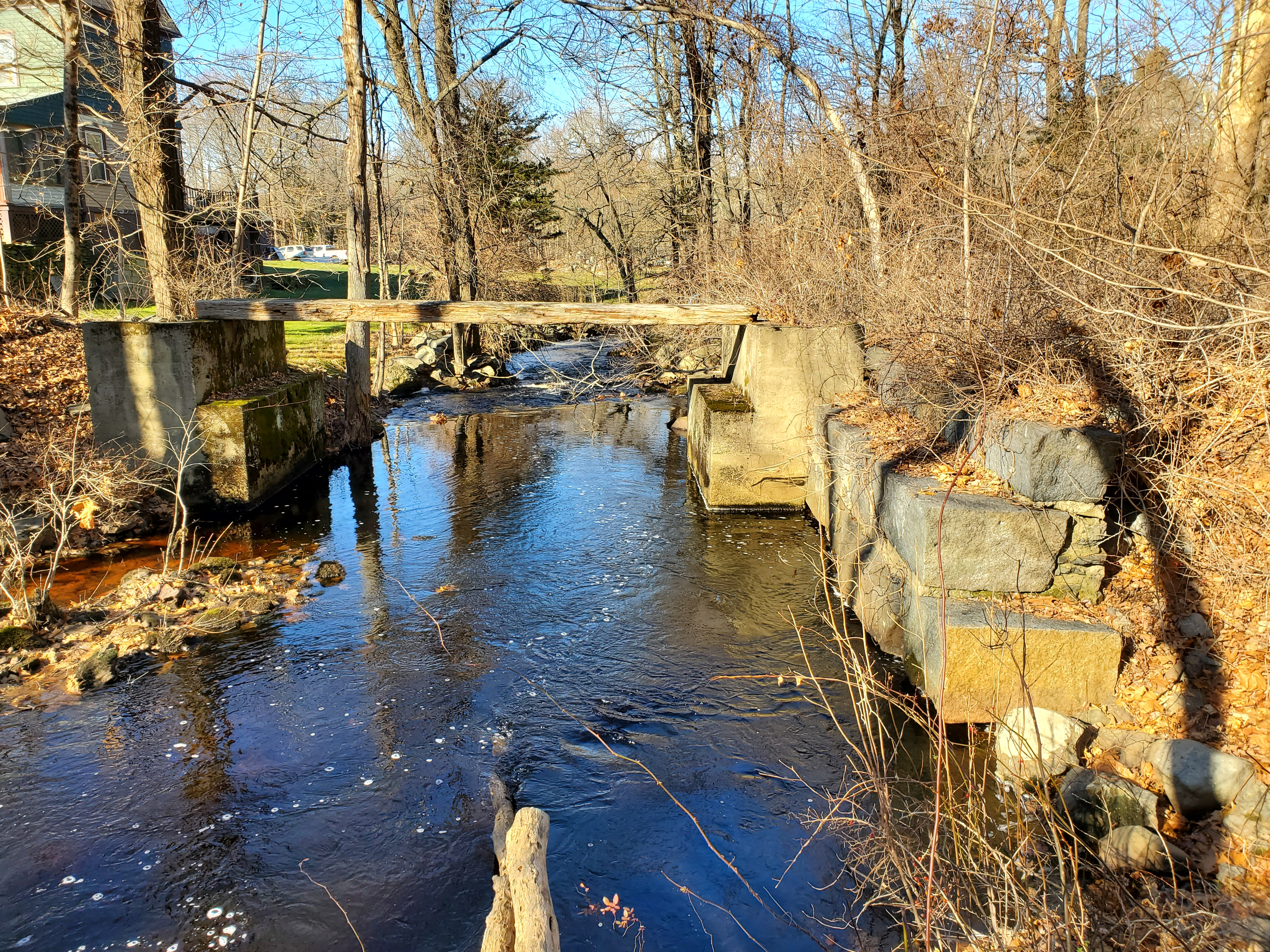
A remaining streetcar bridge abutment from the Providence–Taunton interurban line on the Palmer River in Rehoboth

The town is full of winding, country roads. The longest state routes through town, U.S. Route 44 and Massachusetts Route 118, intersect near the center of town. U.S. Route 6 and Interstate 195 run through the southwest corner of town for approximately 0.7 and 1.5 miles (2.4 km), respectively. Exit 2 off I-195 ("Route 136/Warren, R.I.–Newport, R.I.") is just south of where the interstate passes into Swansea and can be reached by Kingsley Way (which also leads into Route 136).

Rehoboth is a part of the Greater Attleboro Taunton Regional Transit Authority (GATRA), which provides bus service to towns in central Bristol and Plymouth counties.

Rehoboth is one of the few towns in Massachusetts where mainline railroads were never constructed. Historically, only a single streetcar line ran through the town; the Providence and Taunton Street Railway began interurban trolley service in 1891 along what is now U.S. Route 44 (referred as the Providence-Taunton Line). The line diverted into a forested area and crossed Bay State Road north of the intersection with Moulton Street (a site known as Nichol's Crossing) in order to serve Rehoboth Village. The service would later be operated by the Old Colony Street Railway and the Eastern Massachusetts Street Railway until it was replaced by buses in the late 1920s. Currently, the nearest rail service is in the adjacent city of Attleboro, where there are two stops (South Attleboro and Attleboro) on the MBTA's Providence/Stoughton Line.

The closest small aircraft public airports are located in Taunton and Mansfield. T. F. Green Airport is located in Warwick, RI, less than 20 miles (32 km) away. The nearest international airport is Logan International Airport in Boston, 53 miles (85 km) away.

== Notable people ==
- Fanny Alger, possibly the first plural wife of Joseph Smith
- Roger Amidon, early settler
- Mary Butterworth, a colonial American who ran a counterfeiting ring
- Isaac Case, itinerant Baptist pastor, evangelist, and church planter
- John W. Davis, former Rhode Island governor
- Michael Glancy, contemporary glass artist
- Darius Goff, mill owner who descended from Richard Goff, one of the first settlers in Rehoboth.
- Jason Hammel, former professional baseball pitcher for six teams over thirteen seasons
- Wayne Webb, professional ten-pin bowler and member of the PBA and USBC Halls of Fame
- Nate DiMeo, podcaster, screenwriter, and author. Creator of The Memory Palace podcast and author of the book of the same name.
