= Coram Shipyard Historic District =

Historic district in Massachusetts, United States

- U.S. National Register of Historic Places
- U.S. Historic district
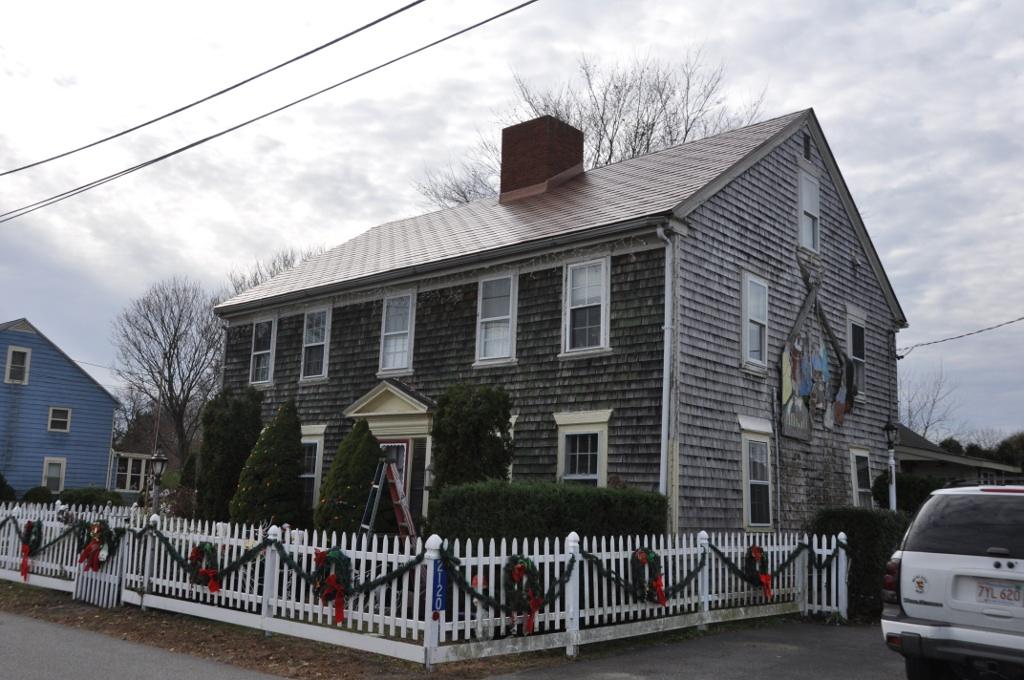
- 2120 Water St.

- Location within Massachusetts Location within the United States
- Location: Dighton, Massachusetts
- Coordinates: 41°48′46″N 71°7′2″W
- Area: 2.1 acres (0.85 ha)
- Built: 1698
- Architectural style: Georgian, Colonial
- NRHP reference No.: 97000625
- Added to NRHP: January 5, 1998

The Coram Shipyard Historic District is a historic district encompassing a colonial-era shipyard at 2120, 2125, and 2130 Water Street in Dighton, Massachusetts. The district includes two houses, built c. 1700, and the archaeologically sensitive site of a shipyard which operated for a roughly five-year period between 1698 and 1703. The shipyard site is now home to the Taunton River Yacht Club, whose property includes the wharf built by Thomas Coram and John Hathaway, the proprietors of the shipyard. The district was listed on the National Register of Historic Places in 1998.

== Description and history ==
The town of Dighton, located on the west bank of the Taunton River in central Bristol County, Massachusetts, was settled by European colonists in the 1680s and incorporated as a town in 1712. It became significant as a maritime shipping endpoint in the 18th century because seagoing vessels were unable navigate further up the river. As a result, shipyards and wharves were built in several places on the banks of the river. Its very first shipyard was established about 1698 in an area that is just south of the junction of Main and Water Streets along the midsection of the town's shoreline with the river. The surviving elements of this shipyard include the two houses of its principal operators, Thomas Coram and John Hathaway, and a stone wharf they built into the river.

The wharf that Coram and Hathaway built is now home to the Taunton River Yacht Club. The wharf, measuring about 50 by 75 feet (15 m × 23 m), is located behind the club's c. 1950 clubhouse, and is made of rough-cut stone now covered in grass. Modern pilings have been built around its edges to provide access to the river. Opposite the wharf stands the house of John Hathaway, with that of Thomas Coram just to its south. Both houses are now 2-1/2 story wood frame houses, with a central chimney and a side gable roof. It is unknown how the houses appeared at the time of their construction c. 1699-1700, because architectural analysis of their structure has not been conducted. The present appearance of both houses suggest mid-18th century Georgian architecture, the Coram house having been altered in the 19th century by an Italianate porch across three of its front base (rebuilt with less styling in the 20th century).

As of September 2025 on Google Street View, 2120 Water St has been demolished and is being replaced with a modern structure.

== See also ==
- Dighton Wharves Historic District, a short way downriver
- Thomas Coram
- National Register of Historic Places listings in Bristol County, Massachusetts
