= Frederick C. Anderson =

- Born: March 24, 1842; Boston, Massachusetts, U.S.
- Died: October 6, 1882 (aged 40); Providence, Rhode Island, U.S.
- Burial place: Dighton community church Cemetery; Dighton, Massachusetts
- Military career
- Allegiance: United States of America; Union
- Branch: United States Army; Union Army
- Service years: 1861–1865
- Rank: Private
- Units: 18th Regiment Massachusetts Volunteer Infantry; 32nd Regiment Massachusetts Volunteer Infantry
- Conflicts: American Civil War • Second Battle of Bull Run • Battle of Antietam • Battle of Fredericksburg • Battle of Chancellorsville • Battle of Gettysburg • Battle of Globe Tavern
- Awards: Medal of Honor

Frederick Charles Anderson (March 24, 1842 – October 6, 1882) was a Union Army soldier in the American Civil War who received the United States military's highest decoration, the Medal of Honor. Born in Boston, Massachusetts, and orphaned at a young age, Anderson was adopted by a farming family in rural Raynham. He enlisted in the Union Army shortly after the start of the war and, as a private in the 18th Regiment Massachusetts Volunteer Infantry, participated in several major battles, including Antietam, Fredericksburg, Chancellorsville, and Gettysburg. He was awarded the Medal of Honor for capturing a Confederate battle flag during the Battle of Globe Tavern on August 21, 1864. Transferred to the 32nd Regiment Massachusetts Volunteer Infantry and wounded in the Siege of Petersburg, he returned to the field in time to witness the Confederate surrender at Appomattox Court House. After the war, he returned to Massachusetts, working and raising a family until his sudden death at age 40.

== Early life ==
Anderson was born on March 24, 1842, in Boston, Massachusetts, to Frederick C. and Elizabeth Anderson. By age eight he was living in a South Boston workhouse called the House of Industry. The facility was later described as "[a]n asylum for the insane and refuge for the deserted and the most destitute children of the city". It is unclear what happened to Anderson's parents, although their complete disappearance from public records suggests that they were deceased.

At age 14, Anderson was sent on the Orphan Train, which transported orphaned, abandoned, and homeless children from large East Coast cities to rural areas, where they were taken in by families and put to work. When the train reached Raynham, Massachusetts, Anderson was selected by Stilman Wilber, a local farmer. He lived and worked on the Wilber farm until his enlistment in the military.

== Civil War service ==
Four months after the start of the Civil War, on August 24, 1861, Anderson was mustered into the Union Army at Camp Brigham in Dedham, Massachusetts. A 19-year-old private, he joined Company A of the 18th Regiment Massachusetts Volunteer Infantry. In regimental records, he was described as "5 foot 3 inches in height, with a light complexion, blue eyes and sandy hair".

In late August 1862, one year after enlisting, Anderson participated in his first engagement, the Second Battle of Bull Run, where the 18th Massachusetts sustained its heaviest casualties of the war. A few weeks later they took part in the Battle of Antietam, and on December 13 the unit saw heavy action at the Battle of Fredericksburg. At Fredericksburg, the 18th Massachusetts advanced across open ground on a frontal assault against Confederate positions on Marye's Heights. Although the attack was repulsed under intense fire, the regiment's advance was among the most successful, having come closer to the Confederate lines than most other Union units. The next year, Anderson took part in the Battle of Chancellorsville in late April and early May and the Battle of Gettysburg on July 2, where his unit fought in the Wheatfield as part of the V Corps.

In August 1864, the second month of the Siege of Petersburg, Union forces, including Anderson's regiment, cut the Weldon Railroad which supplied Petersburg and the Confederate capital of Richmond. On the morning of August 21, the Confederates attacked in an attempt to regain control of the railway. The 18th Massachusetts lead a counterattack against the smaller Confederate force, and during this action, which came to be known as the Battle of Globe Tavern, Anderson captured the 27th South Carolina Infantry Regiment's flag and flag bearer. Regimental flags were an important means of communication and identification during the war; the loss of a flag was a great blow to a regiment's morale, and the capture of an enemy flag was seen as a sign of bravery in close-quarters fighting.

For his actions at Globe Tavern, Anderson was awarded the Medal of Honor during a ceremony on September 13, 1864. With the captured Confederate flags on display, Anderson and several other men of the V Corps were decorated by General George Meade, commander of the Army of the Potomac. His official citation reads: "Capture of battle flag of 27th South Carolina (C.S.A.) and the color bearer."

The 18th Massachusetts was disbanded on September 2, 1864, after three years of service. Soldiers who chose to reenlist for another three-year term, such as Anderson, and those who still had time left on their original enlistment were merged into the 32nd Regiment Massachusetts Volunteer Infantry. When the 32nd engaged in the ongoing Siege of Petersburg in early December, Anderson was wounded in the left foot. He was sent to the V Corps hospital in City Point, Virginia, and after two and a half weeks was transferred to Jarvis Hospital in Baltimore, Maryland, arriving there on December 26. A month later, on January 31, 1865, he rejoined his regiment. As a reward for reenlisting, he was granted a 45-day furlough, which he took in February and March. He returned in time to watch the surrender of the Confederate Army of Northern Virginia on April 9 at Appomattox Court House, effectively ending the war. Anderson and the other soldiers of the 32nd Massachusetts were mustered out of service on June 29, 1865, in Boston.

== Later life ==
After the war, Anderson stayed in Massachusetts and settled in the town of Somerset. On May 20, 1866, he married Sarah E. Francis in Taunton. The couple had three children: Carrie M., born in 1872, Herbert Newell, born in 1875, and Cecilia Ann, born in 1878. Anderson died suddenly of "apoplexy" at age 40 while working at the Worcester Railroad freight yard in Providence, Rhode Island. He was reportedly buried at the Anderson Family Cemetery in Somerset; however no record of this cemetery's existence was found. In 2011, a researcher discovered Anderson's grave at the Dighton Community Church cemetery in Dighton, Massachusetts.

== See also ==
- List of American Civil War Medal of Honor recipients: A–F
