= Dighton Community Church =

- Pedo Baptist Congregational Society of Dighton
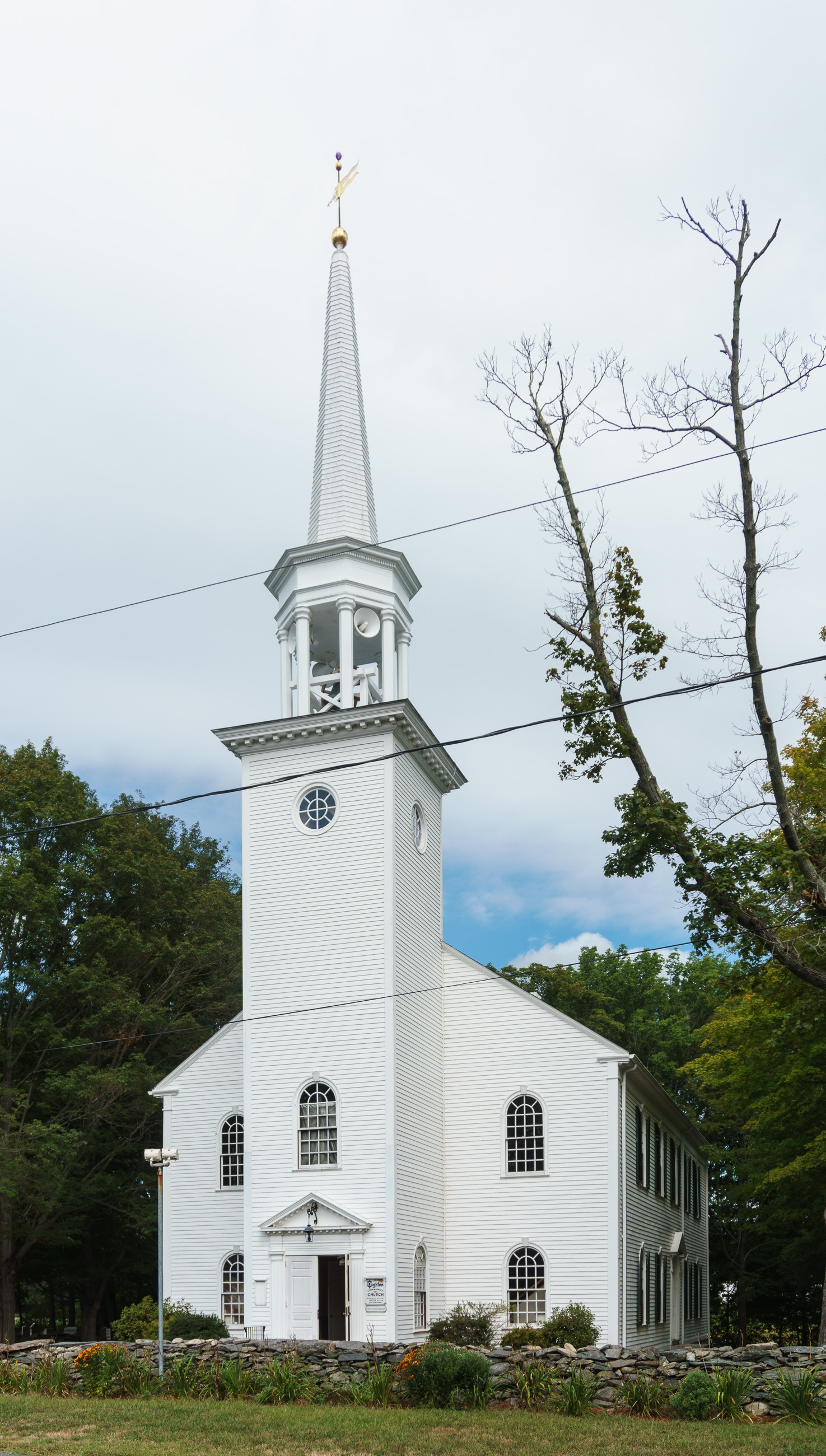

- Location within Massachusetts
- 41°49′0.156″N 71°7′46.3578″W
- Location: Dighton, Massachusetts
- Country: United States
- Denomination: Non-denominational
- Previous denomination: Congregational, Unitarian
- Website: http://dightoncommunitychurch.com

History
- Former name(s): Dighton Unitarian Church, Church of the Lower Four Corners
- Status: active
- Founded: 1769

Architecture
- Designated: 1770
- Style: Colonial
- Years built: 1769-1798
- Groundbreaking: 1769
- Completed: 1770, 1798

Dighton Community Church is a non-denominational church in Dighton, Massachusetts. Formerly known as the Dighton Unitarian Church. The congregation, formally and legally known as the Pedo-Baptist Congregational Society due to the practice of infant baptism, was founded in 1769 and incorporated in 1798. The building was begun around 1769 and "completed enough for use" in Spring 1770. The building was finished in 1798. A tower was added in 1827 to house a Revere Bell.

== History ==
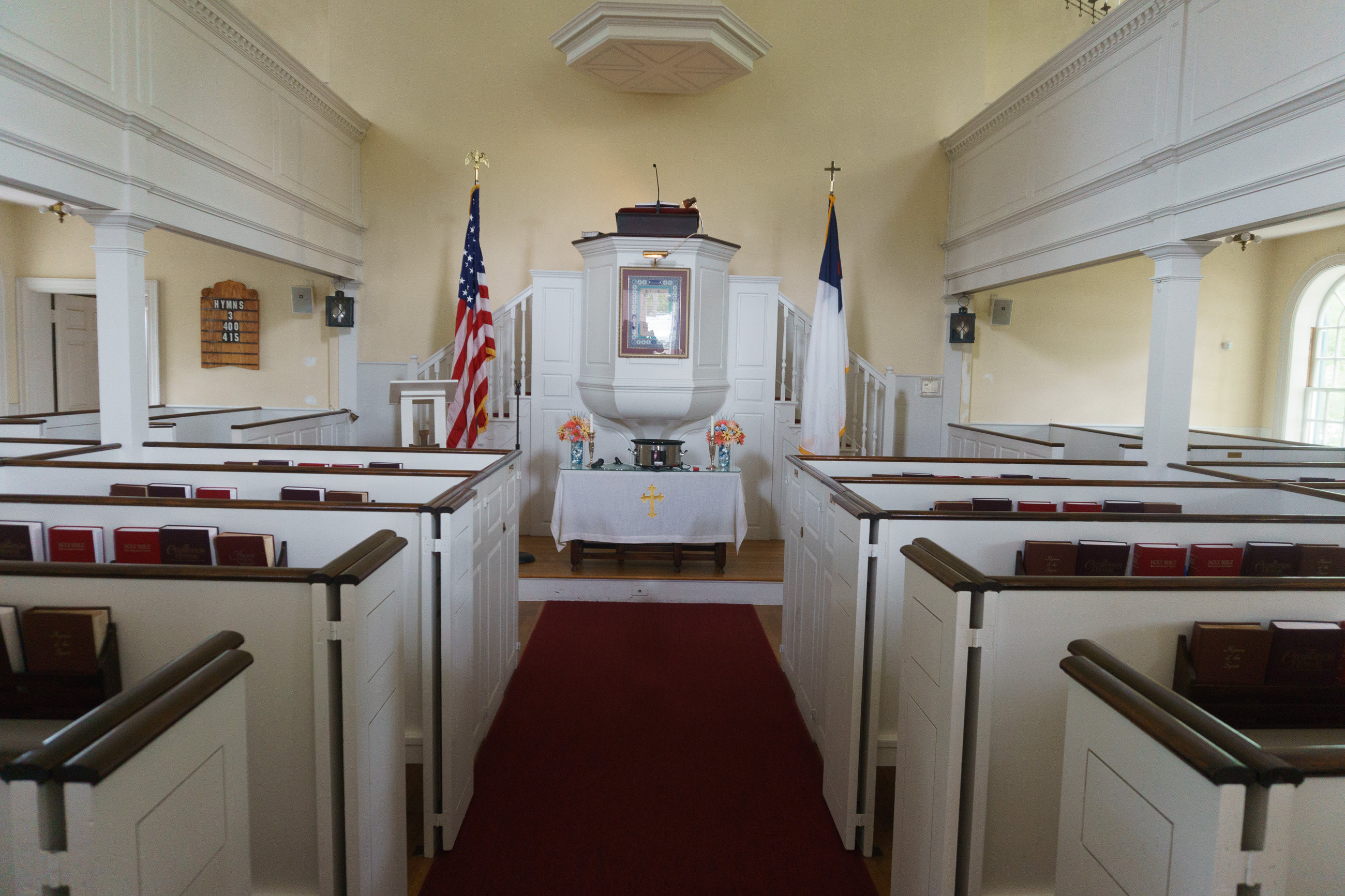
Church interior

In 1767, the first meeting house in Dighton Village burned to the ground. A new meeting house was built in an area called Buck Plain, but residents were unhappy with the location.

In 1769, a group of well-off traders and businessmen formed the Pedo Baptist Congregational Society. (The name "Pedo" referred to the practice of infant baptism). This group selected a new building site in the village at Lower Four Corners, at the eastern edge of a cornfield used by the Pokanoket tribe. A tree in this field was used by Native Americans as a meeting place; King Philip (Metacomet) was said to have visited the tree many times.

Construction on the church building was "completed sufficiently for use" by Spring 1770; however, the church was yet unfinished, with no tower or steeple. During the Revolutionary War, the unfinished church was used as a barracks for colonial soldiers, and sometimes to hold sheep. Construction was finally finished on the main building in 1798. At this time the building still lacked a bell tower.

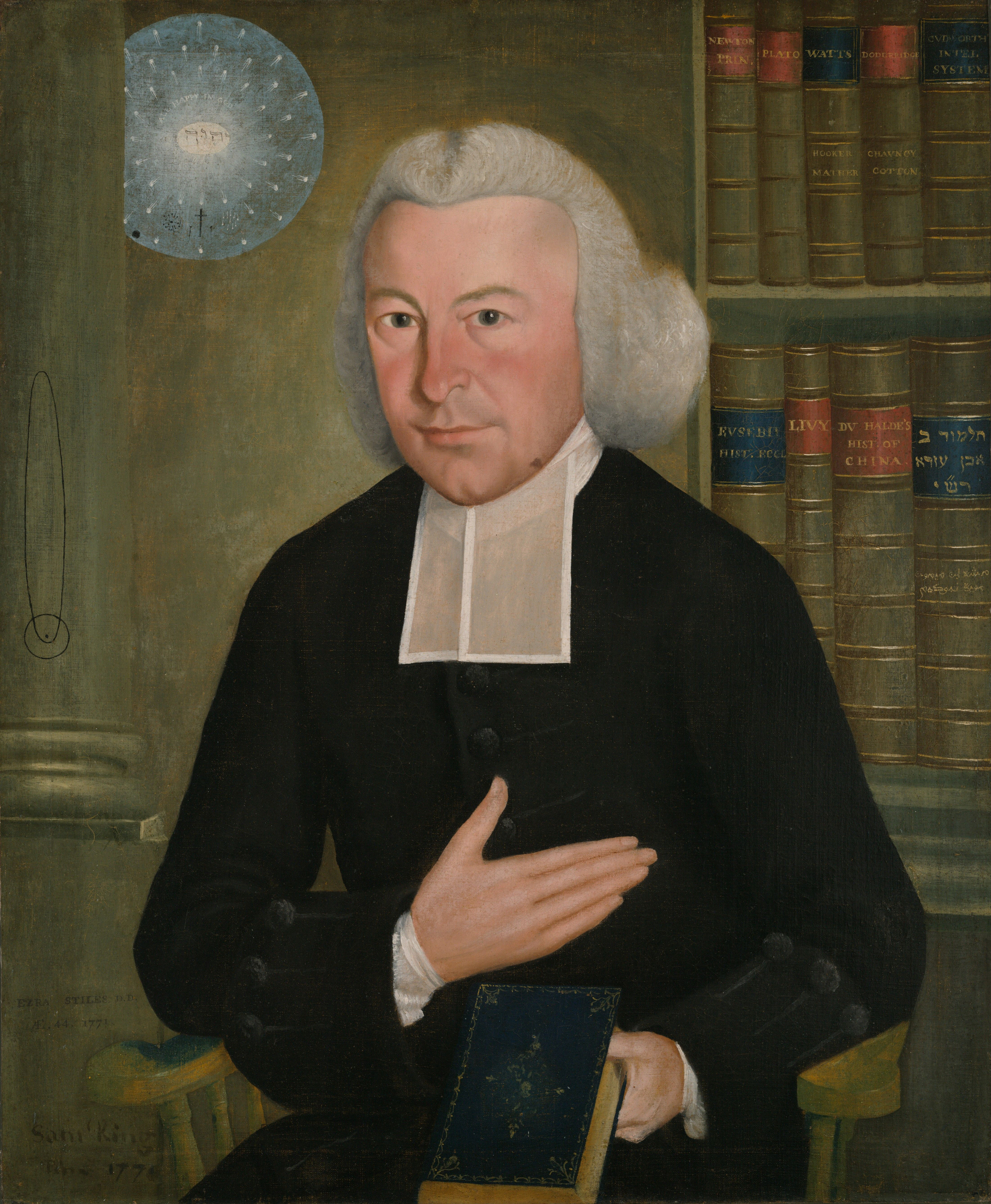
Ezra Stiles

Ezra Stiles arrived in Dighton from Newport with a congregation which included William Ellery. They lived together in the Whitmarsh house on Elm Street, just north of the church. Ellery represented Rhode Island as a member of the Continental Congress, and he traveled by horse from Dighton to Philadelphia for meetings. After the Declaration of Independence was approved on July 4, 1776, a copy was brought to Dighton. On July 13, 1776, a copy of the Declaration was read in the church, most likely read by Ezra Stiles.

Stiles became the first minister of the church in 1777.

The Pedo Baptist (Child Baptizing) Congregational Society of Dighton was incorporated June 25, 1798.

In 1870 the church received an English Georgian era organ which had been used in the Harvard College Chapel. In 1949 a new organ was installed inside the case of the old organ.

The name changed to Community Church in 1971.

=== Revere Bell ===
The bell tower features a Revere Bell. It was cast at the Revere Foundry and purchased by Joseph Revere in 1821. The bell bears the inscription "Revere Boston 1821", and is listed in the Revere Stockbook as "Bell Number 254."

The bell was hauled from Canton to Dighton by two oxen in 1821, and hung in a small shed in the church yard. A tower was built for the bell, where it was installed in 1827 and rung frequently. The bell's yoke and wheel were restored in 2012–2013.

=== Renovations ===
The church was renovated in 1830, when the pew layout was changed and the Elm Street door removed. The church was modernized in 1861 and had a complete renovation in 1930.

Various repairs and restorations were conducted in the 1980s, including repainting and a new roof.

In 2002 the steeple was removed and transported to Vermont, where it was completely rebuilt, and re-installed in September of that year.

== Traditions ==
- The church has been known locally for its annual Day Lily Show, held every summer since 1960. The Day Lily show was not held in 2016.
- Every year since the town's 300th anniversary in 2012 (or possibly since 2011), the Declaration of Independence has been read aloud as part of the town's July 4 commemorations.

== Cemetery ==
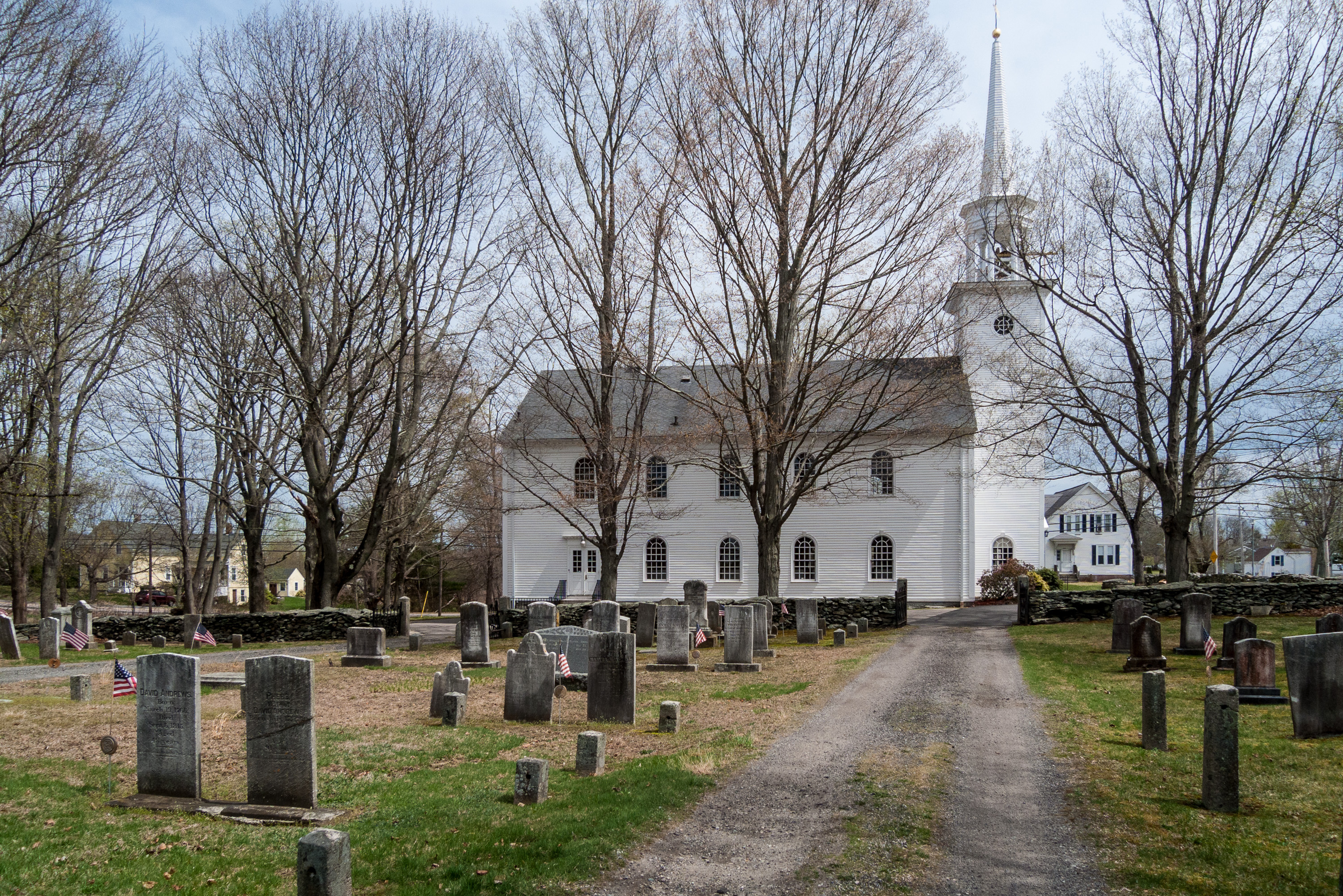
The cemetery.

On the West side of the cemetery, on the site of the old Indian cornfield, is a cemetery. The Massachusetts Historical Commission refers to this cemetery in MACRIS as DIG805. The earliest burial in the cemetery dates to about 1750. Many members of the locally prominent Baylies family are buried here.

Medal of Honor recipient Frederick C. Anderson is buried in the cemetery.
