= Thomas Coram =

English sea captain and philanthropist (c. 1668–1751)

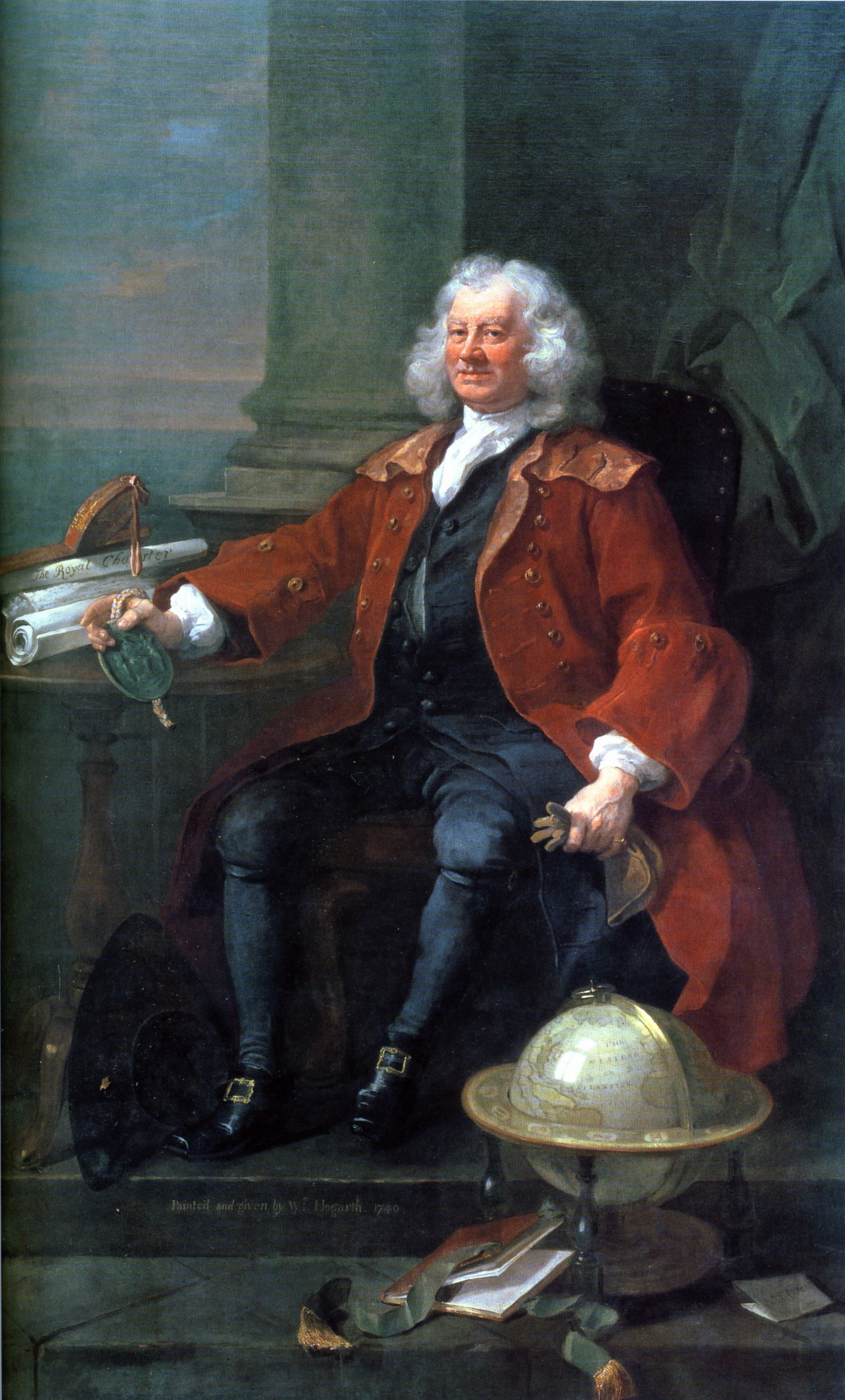
- Portrait of Captain Thomas Coram by William Hogarth, 1740
- Born: c. 1668; Lyme Regis, Dorset, England
- Died: 29 March 1751 (aged 83); London, Great Britain
- Occupations: Shipwright, sea captain, philanthropist
- Spouse: Eunice Waite (m. 1700; died 1740)

Captain Thomas Coram (c. 1668 – 29 March 1751) was an English sea captain and philanthropist who created the London Foundling Hospital in Lamb's Conduit Fields, Bloomsbury, to look after abandoned children on the streets of London. It is said to be the world's first incorporated charity.

== Early life ==
Thomas Coram was born in Lyme Regis, Dorset, England. His father is believed to have been a master mariner. He was sent to sea at age 11. As such, he never received a proper education. (Note: "He wrote that his mother died when he was young and he went to sea in his eleventh year, that his father remarried and moved to Hackney, and that he, Thomas, was later apprenticed by his father to a Thames-side shipwright" (Taylor 2006).) In 1694, he was settled in what is now Dighton, Massachusetts, then part of Taunton. Coram lived in Dighton for ten years, founding a shipyard there.

By a deed dated 8 December 1703, he gave 59 acres (24 ha) of land at Taunton to be used for a schoolhouse, whenever the people should desire the establishment of the Church of England. In the deed, he is described as "of Boston, sometimes residing in Taunton", and he seems to have been a shipwright. He gave some books to form a library at St. Thomas' Church, Taunton, one of which, a Book of Common Prayer given to him by Speaker Onslow, is preserved in the church.

In 1704, at the age of 36, he returned to London and helped to obtain an act of Parliament giving a bounty on the importation of tar from the colonies. He carried on business for some time. During the War of the Spanish Succession (1701–1714), he commanded a merchant ship and acquired the epithet of captain. In 1712, he obtained a role in Trinity House, Deptford, a private corporation that combined public responsibilities with charitable purposes. In 1717, he unsuccessfully promoted the idea of founding a colony to be called 'Georgia' in what is today Maine as a philanthropic venture. In 1719, he was stranded off Cuxhaven, when sailing for Hamburg in the Sea Flower, and the ship was plundered by the neighbouring inhabitants.

He became known for his public spirit. Old Horace Walpole (afterwards Lord Walpole) called him (18 April 1735) "the honestest, most disinterested, most knowing person about the plantations he had ever talked with". He obtained an act of parliament taking off the prohibition upon deal from Germany and the Netherlands. In 1732, he was appointed one of the trustees for Georgia Colony, then founded through James Oglethorpe's exertions.

In 1735, he brought forward a scheme for settling unemployed English artisans in Nova Scotia. The plan was approved by the board of trade and, after being dropped for a time, was carried out before Coram's death. Brocklesby also states that on some occasion, he obtained a change in the colonial regulations in the interest of English hatters, and refused to take any reward from his clients except a hat.

== Foundling Hospital ==
While living in Rotherhithe and regularly travelling into London to engage in his business interests (a journey of about 4 miles (6.4 km)), Coram was frequently shocked by the sight of infants exposed in the streets, often in a dying state. He began to agitate for the foundation of a foundling hospital. This institution was to be a children's home for children and orphans who could not be properly cared for. He demanded to have the foundling hospital for 17 years. He laboured for seventeen years, and he induced many ladies of rank to sign a memorial. A charter, signed by King George II, was at last obtained for the Foundling Hospital in 1739 and considerable sums were subscribed. The first meeting of the guardians was held at Somerset House on 20 November 1739.

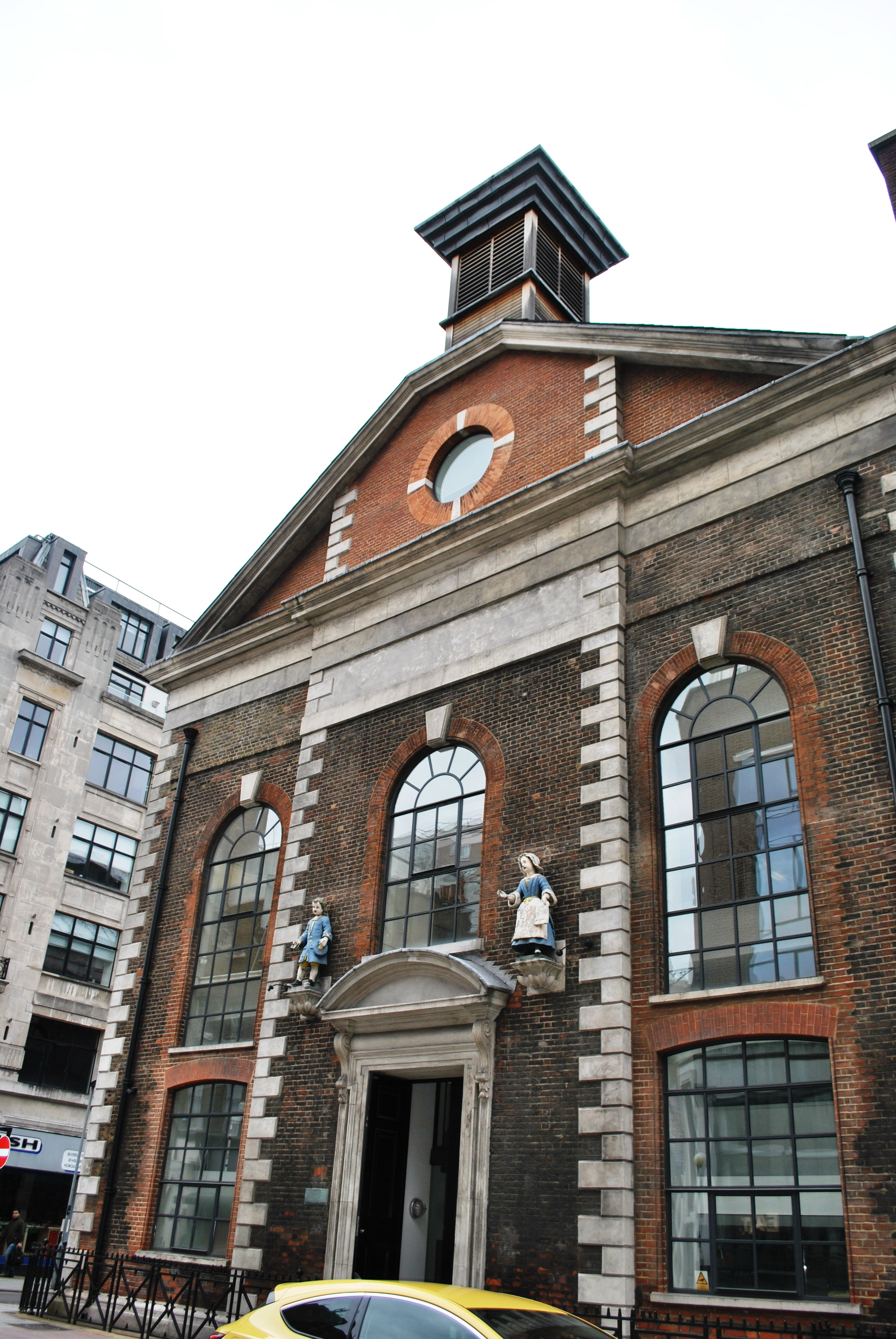
43 Hatton Garden, former 1666 Foundling Hospital by Christopher Wren, now known as Wren House

At a later court, a vote of thanks was presented to Coram, who requested that thanks should also be given to the ladies interested. Some houses were first taken in Hatton Garden, where children were first admitted in 1741. A piece of land was bought for £7,000 in Bloomsbury. Lord Salisbury, the owner, insisted that the whole of his ground "as far as Gray's Inn Lane" should be taken; but he subscribed £500 himself.

The foundation stone of the hospital was laid on 16 September 1742. In October 1745, the west wing was finished and the children removed from Hatton Garden. Great interest was excited in the undertaking, especially by William Hogarth, who in May 1740 presented his fine portrait of Coram to the hospital. Hogarth also presented a picture of Moses with Pharaoh's daughter, and gave 157 tickets in the lottery for the "March to Finchley", one of which won the prize. In addition, he introduced a portrait of Coram into an engraved power of attorney for receiving subscriptions to the hospital. Handel gave performances at the hospital in 1749 and 1750.

== Later life ==
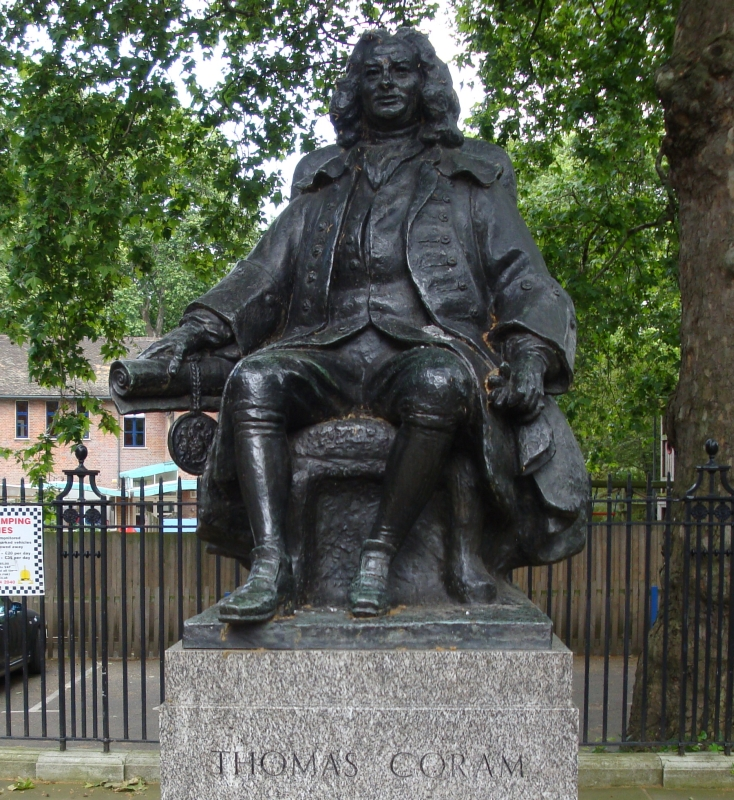
Statue of Thomas Coram, Brunswick Square, London by William McMillan, 1963

Coram continued to be invested in the hospital. Up until 1742, he continued to be elected to the General Committee. But at the May Day meeting in 1742 he received too few votes to qualify, and as a result no longer had any say in the management of the hospital. The reason why he was pushed out is not entirely clear. He was said to have spread defamatory rumours about two of the governors. Another possible reason is that he expressed criticism toward the way the hospital was run.

In his later years, he advocated a scheme for the education of Native American girls in America. During his time in America, he lived and worked with Native Americans leading to an interest in promoting and supporting their education: specifically the girls. Despite the general view at the time that education was not as important for girls, he was of the opinion that it was just as important for them to receive an education, if not more:

An Evil amongst us here in England is to think Girls having learning given them is not so very Material as for boys to have it. I think and say it is more Material for Girls, when they come to be Mothers, will have the forming of their Children's lives and if their Mothers be good or bad the children Generally take after them, so that giving Girls a vertuous Education is a vast Advantage to their Posterity as well as to the Public.

This theme was also prevalent in his plans for the Foundling Hospital in that girls should also receive an education.

After the loss of his wife, he neglected his private affairs, and fell into difficulties. A subscription was raised for him. He told Brocklesby that as he had never wasted his money in self-indulgence, he was not ashamed to confess that he was poor. On 20 March 1749, an annuity of £161 was assigned to him, the Prince of Wales subscribing £21 annually. The pension was transferred on Coram's death to Richard Leveridge, a retired admired singer.

== Family ==
In his own words, Coram said he "descended from virtuous good parentage on both sides." His mother died when he was very young in 1671. There is not much information on his father but he is believed to have been a master mariner. While in Massachusetts, he met and married his wife Eunice Waite. They were married in 1700 and had a happy marriage lasting until her death 40 years later. Despite Coram's dedication to the children of the Foundling Hospital, they did not have any children of their own.

== Death and burial ==
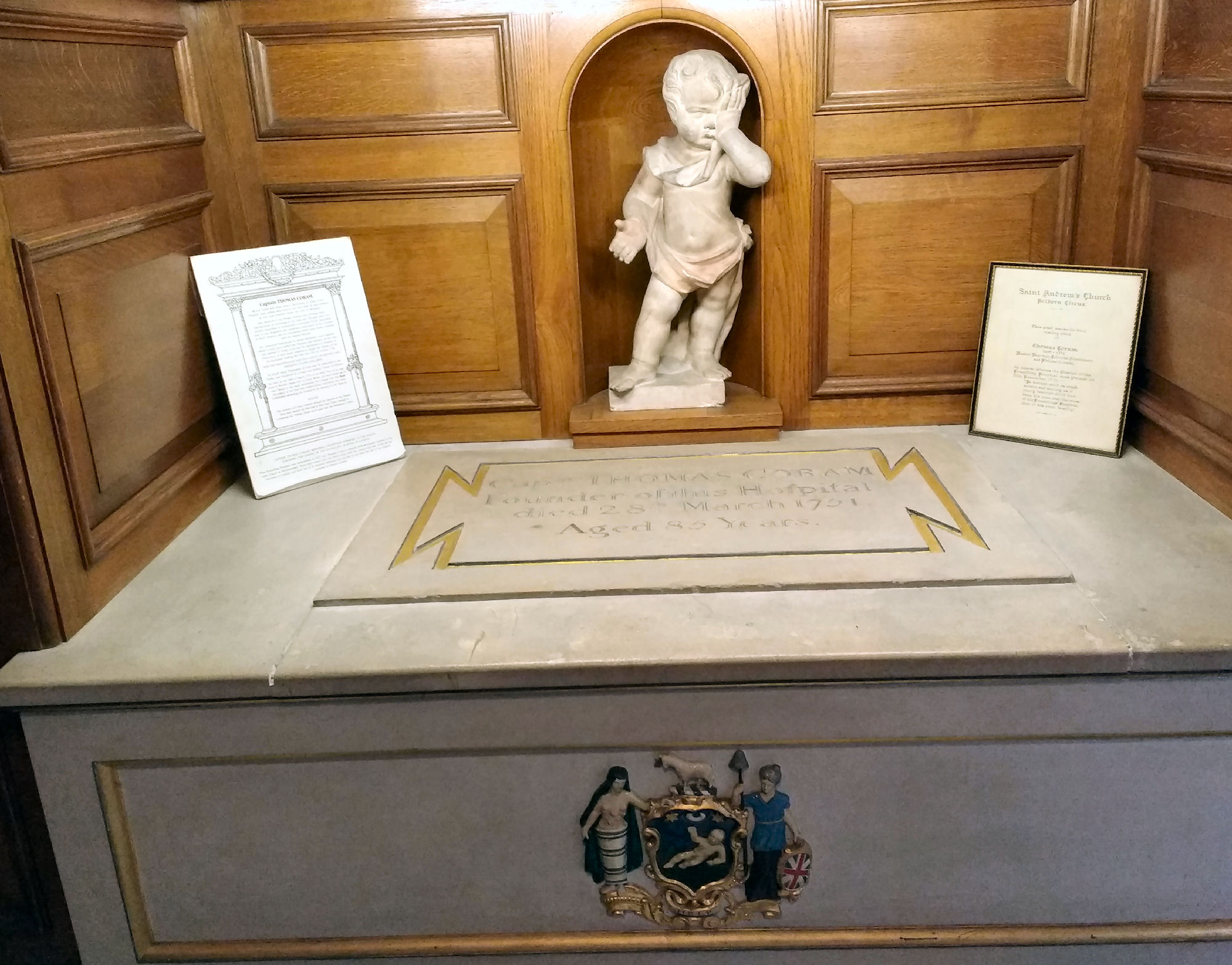
Thomas Coram's memorial in St Andrew's Holborn; his remains were transferred here in the 1950s

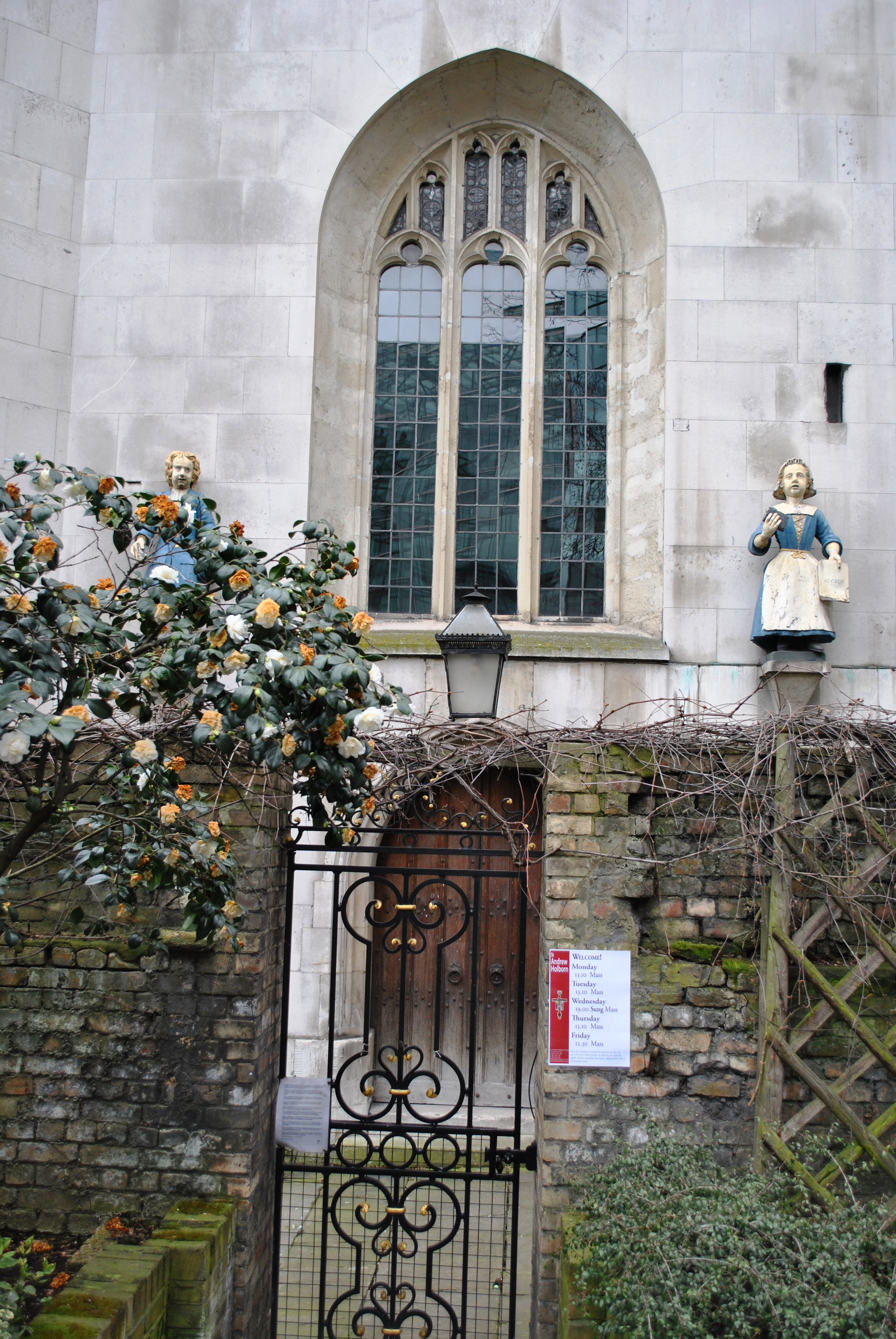
Statues above the side door of St Andrew's Holborn; the same statues from the Foundling Hospital are located in Hatton Garden

Coram died on 29 March 1751, aged 83, and was buried on 3 April in the chapel of the Foundling Hospital. An inscription was placed there, and a statue of him by William Calder Marshall was erected in front of the building a hundred years afterwards. Richard Brocklesby describes him as a rather hot-tempered, downright sailorlike man, of unmistakable honesty and sterling goodness of heart.

In 1935, the Foundling Hospital moved from Bloomsbury to new premises in Berkhamsted in Hertfordshire, and the old Hospital building was demolished. A chapel was erected at the Berkhamsted Hospital with a crypt specially designed to hold Coram's remains. In 1955, the building was sold and Coram's remains were exhumed and moved to the Church of St Andrew, Holborn in London. The chapel still stands today, now part of Ashlyns School.

== Legacy ==
Hogarth, a personal friend of Coram's, was among the first governors of the Foundling Hospital. He painted a famous portrait of Coram (1740; reproduced in stipple by William Nutter [1754-1802] for R. Cribb in 1796) which can now be viewed at the Foundling Museum in London.

Together with some of his fellow artists, Hogarth decorated the Governors' Court Room, which contains paintings by Francis Hayman, Thomas Gainsborough and Richard Wilson. He contributed paintings for the benefit of the Foundation, and the Foundling Hospital became the first art gallery in London open to the public.

Handel allowed a concert performance of Messiah to benefit the foundation, and donated the manuscript of the Hallelujah Chorus to the hospital. He also composed an anthem specially for a performance at the Hospital, now called the Foundling Hospital Anthem.

The Foundling Hospital charity continues today and is known as Coram. The original site is also home to a seven-acre children's park and play area, Coram's Fields, which refuses entry to adults unaccompanied by children. Coram's Fields is a registered charity and also provides children's and youth services for the local community, including a Youth Centre and free Sports Programme.

In 2000, Jamila Gavin published a children's book called Coram Boy about the Foundling Hospital. The book was adapted into a play by Helen Edmundson, which had its world premiere at the Royal National Theatre in London in November 2005 and subsequently had a brief run on Broadway.

== See also ==
- Coram Family
- Foundling Hospital
- Foundling Museum
- Thomas Coram Foundation for Children
