= Segreganset River =

River in Massachusetts, United States

Coordinates: 41.825°N 71.119°W

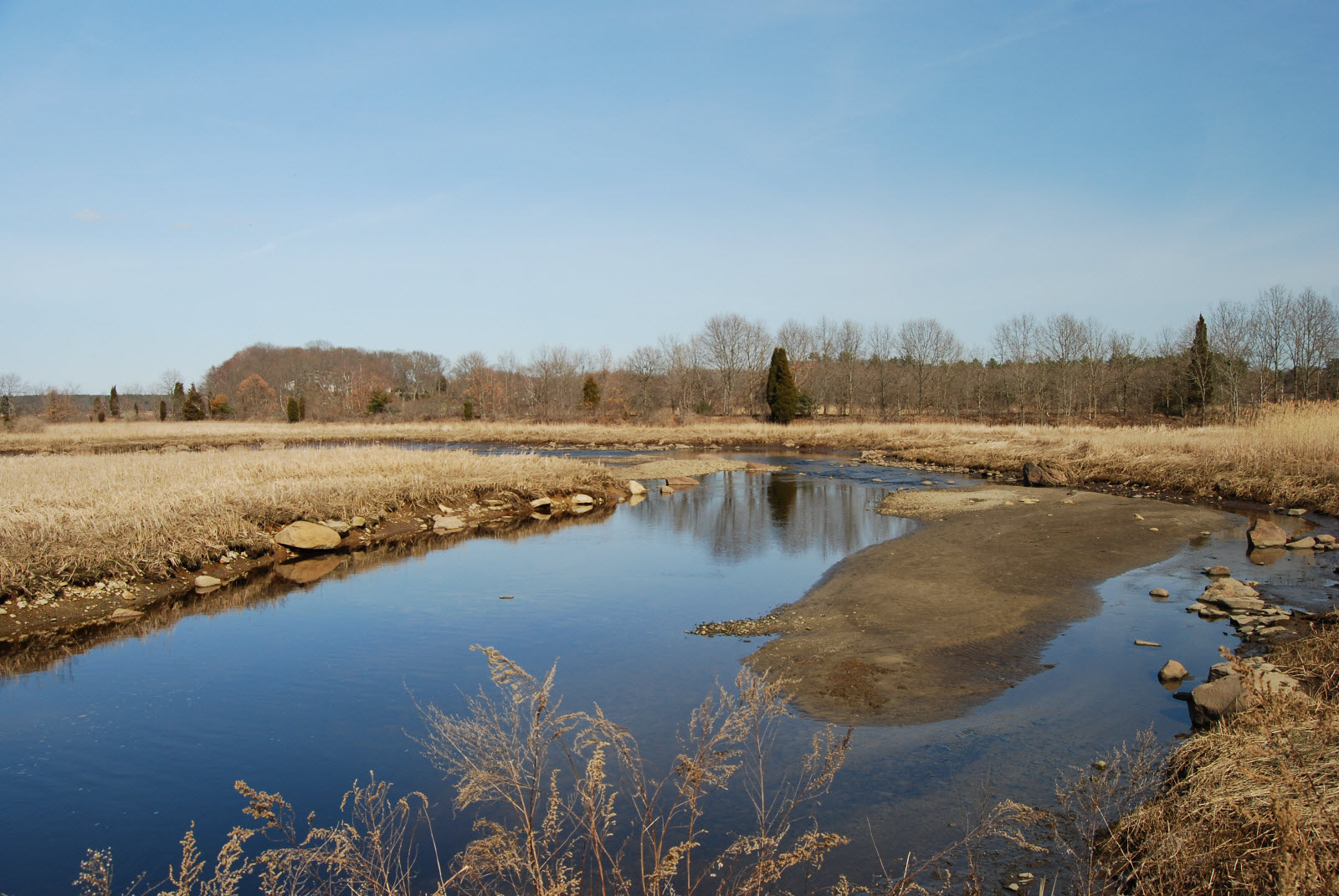
View of Segreganset River at low tide, Dighton, Massachusetts

The Segreganset River is a small river in Bristol County, Massachusetts that flows 9.6 miles (15.4 km) in a southeasterly direction through Taunton and Dighton into the Taunton River. Named tributaries include the Maple Swamp, Poppasquash Swamp, Sunken Brook and Cedar Swamp.

The USGS maintains a gaging station on the Segreganset River near Center Street in Dighton.

== See also ==
- Cole River
- Taunton River Watershed
- Three Mile River
