= Jesse Talbot =

American landscape painter (1805–1879)

- Born: April 4, 1805; Dighton, Massachusetts, US
- Died: January 29, 1879 (aged 73); Brooklyn, New York, US
- Known for: Landscape painting
- Spouse: Mary Augusta Sluyter (September 28, 1817 – April 27, 1884)

Jesse Talbot (April 1, 1805 – January 29/30, 1879) was an American landscape painter and a friend of the poet Walt Whitman. Born in Dighton, Massachusetts, Talbot worked for the American Tract Society and other evangelical Christian organizations in New York City before becoming a professional artist, first exhibiting in the National Academy of Design in 1838. His work was often favorably compared to that of Thomas Cole and other leaders of the Hudson River School of American landscape painters. Talbot developed a friendship with Walt Whitman in the 1850s. The notebook in which Whitman first wrote down the ideas for Leaves of Grass is known as the “Talbot Wilson notebook” because Talbot’s name and address (Wilson Street in Brooklyn, New York) are written on the inside front cover. Talbot died in relative obscurity in 1879.

== Biography ==
=== Early life and career ===
Jesse Talbot was born April 1, 1805, in Dighton, Massachusetts, the youngest child of Josiah Talbot and Lydia Talbot (née Wheaton). Around the age of 15, he moved to Dedham, Massachusetts, to work in the pharmacy of his mother’s youngest sibling, Dr. Jesse Wheaton (1762/3 – November 5, 1847). By 1829, Talbot had moved to New York City, where he was employed by the American Tract Society at its headquarters on Nassau Street in Manhattan, then the center of the New York publishing world. He began by distributing tracts along the city’s wharves, but by 1834 he had been promoted to “Assistant Secretary.” He served as “Recording Secretary” of the New-York Tract Society, an affiliate of the national organization. He also became involved with the American Board of Commissioners for Foreign Missions. Through that organization, he came into contact with the Reverend Richard Sluyter of Claverack, New York, whose daughter Mary Augusta he married in the Dutch Reformed church in that town in 1836.

=== Artistic career ===
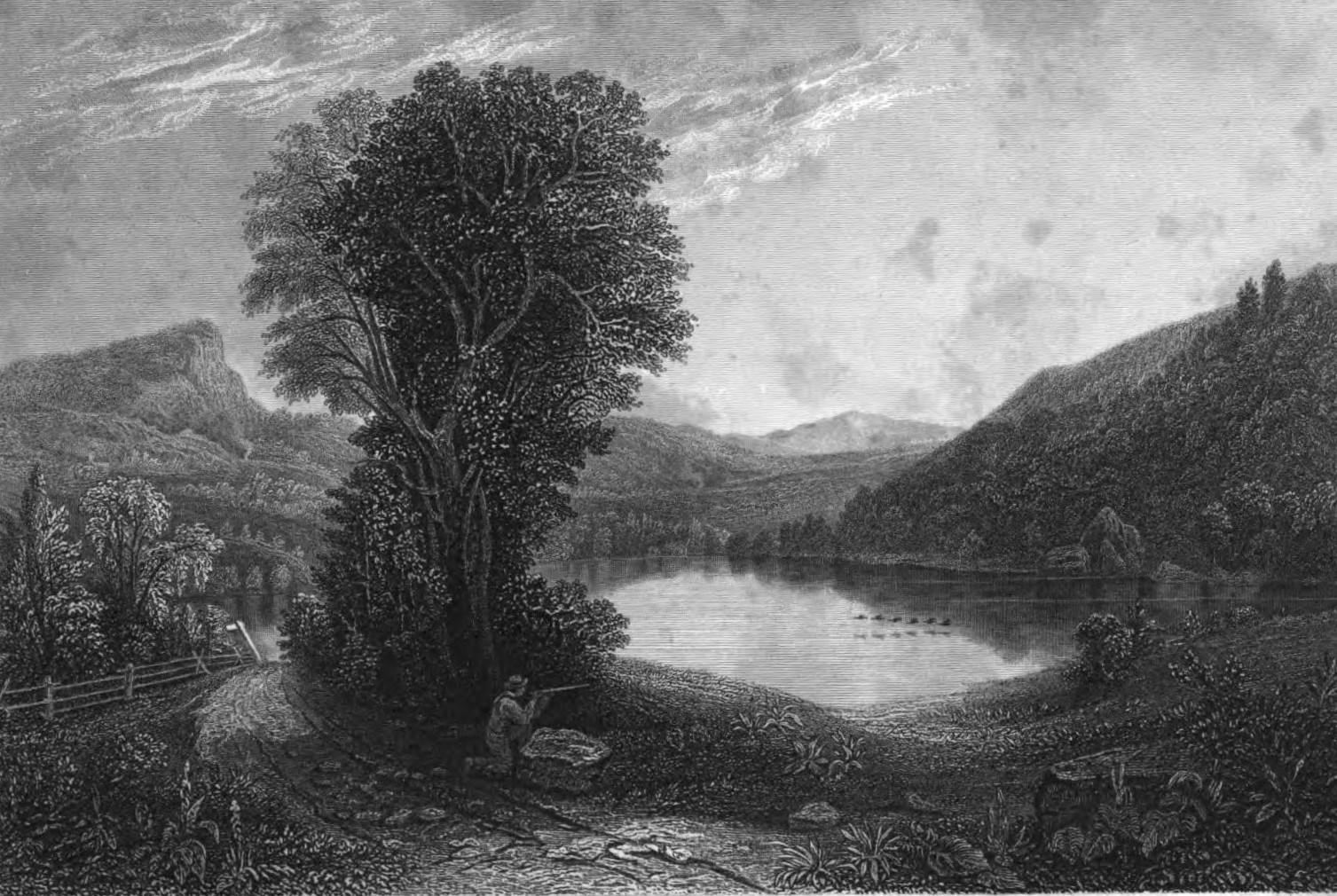
After Jesse Talbot, Rockland Lake, in The Token and Atlantic Souvenir: An Offering for Christmas and the New Year (Boston: David H. Williams, 1842).

Talbot’s artistic career began at the 1838 annual exhibition of the National Academy of Design in New York, in which he exhibited two portraits and a landscape (all unlocated). His earliest known extant work is a portrait frontispiece for a biography printed by the American Tract Society in 1840. Other notable early works include the paintings Rockland Lake (1840; unlocated), which was reproduced in The Token and Atlantic Souvenir of 1842, and The Happy Valley (1841), based on Samuel Johnson’s Rasselas (private collection). These paintings caught the attention of the critics and fellow artists, with many praising his use of atmosphere and comparing him to Thomas Cole. The painter Jasper Francis Cropsey said that Talbot was “third in excellence” among American landscape painters, after Cole and Asher Brown Durand. He became an associate member of the National Academy in 1845.

In 1844 Talbot moved to Paterson, New Jersey, on the falls of the Passaic River. His 1845 painting of the falls is in the collection of the New Jersey Historical Society. While based in Paterson, he continued to submit works for the annual exhibitions of the National Academy and the American Art-Union. His 1847 painting Christian at the Cross (private collection), based on John Bunyan’s The Pilgrim’s Progress, was exhibited at both venues in that year and received critical acclaim from the New York press. Two years later, in 1849, he produced another canvas based on The Pilgrim’s Progress, entitled Departure of Christian from the Palace, Called Beautiful, which he exhibited at the National Academy. Although he completed both of these paintings when other National Academy artists were conceptualizing a major moving panorama based on The Pilgrim’s Progress, Talbot was not credited as a contributor to that project. This may suggest that, despite his critical success, he was not part of the inner circle of New York–based landscape painters at the time.

=== Friendship with Walt Whitman ===
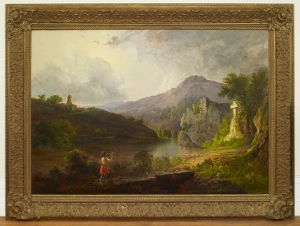
Jesse Talbot (American, 1805–1879), Christian at the Cross, 1847, oil on canvas, 29 x 57 in. Private collection. Photo by Bif Hendrix

By 1850, Talbot returned from Paterson to New York, where he lived in Brooklyn and maintained a studio in Manhattan. At this time he began a friendship with Walt Whitman, then a 31-year-old journalist. Whitman wrote about Talbot three times in 1850, including a retrospective of the artist’s career to date in which he discusses Rockland Lake, The Happy Valley, and Talbot’s two paintings based on The Pilgrim’s Progress. Whitman also visited Talbot’s home in Brooklyn, a fact that is supported by Talbot’s name and address (on Brooklyn’s Wilson Street) inscribed on the front cover of Whitman’s so-called “Talbot Wilson notebook,” in which the poet first wrote down the ideas that would become his celebrated volume Leaves of Grass, first published in 1855. In 1891, Talbot’s daughter Mary Augusta (Talbot) Burhans wrote to Whitman on his deathbed, recalling his repeated visits to the Talbot family home: “Believe me Honored Sir, I can see the Yorkville Stage stopping at our door pleasant summer afternoons in 1852 and Walt Whitman and Jesse Talbot getting down from the upper most [stage?] and then the long and instructive chats, over good coffee, and paintings.”

Whitman wrote about Talbot at least three more times in 1851, 1852, and 1853, in a series of articles criticizing the National Academy for not accepting Talbot’s 1851 painting Encampment of the Caravan (unlocated). The last of these, published in The American Phrenological Journal of 1853, confirms that Whitman owned a smaller version (unlocated) of Talbot’s Christian at the Cross. Whitman later surrendered the painting to creditors.

=== Decline and death ===
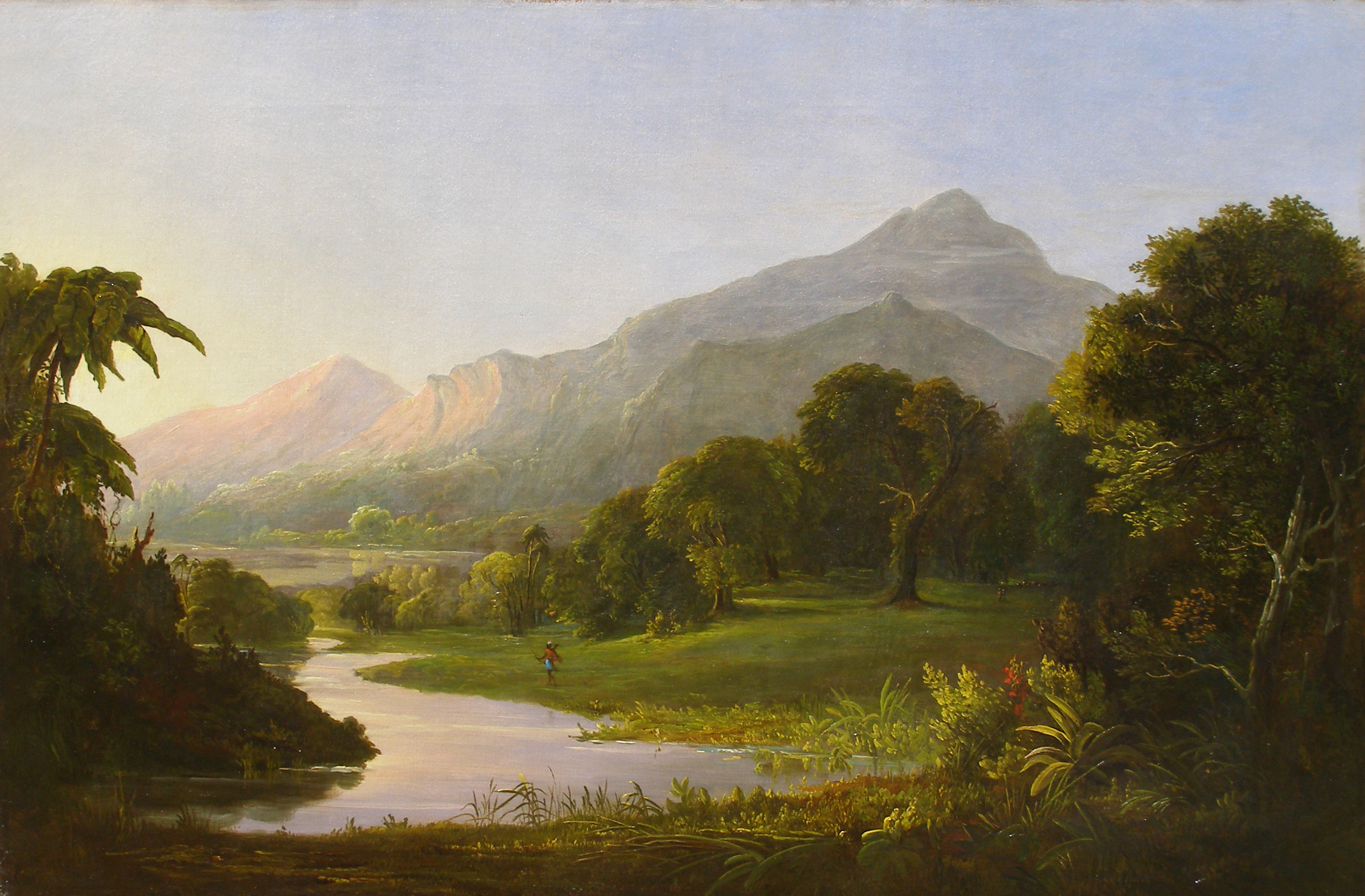
Jesse Talbot, Tropical Scenery–Early Morning, 1850, oil on canvas. Collections of the Dyer Library and Saco Museum, Saco, Maine. Photo by Martha Cox.

Talbot continued to produce major paintings in the early 1850s, including Tropical Scenery—Early Morning, now at the Saco Museum; two paintings depicting the mythical “Phantom Ship” of New Haven, Connecticut, now at the New Haven Museum; and, all currently unlocated, On the Juniata (engraved to accompany a text by Bayard Taylor for The Home Book of the Picturesque); Discovery of the Hudson; and Indian’s Last Gaze. An unidentified painting of his was also the subject of an 1855 poem by Park Benjamin. However, as the decade wore on, Talbot participated in fewer public exhibitions, apparently suffering a career setback with the 1852 dissolution of the American Art-Union. His series on the sons of Noah, exhibited at Brooklyn’s Polytechnic Institute in 1862, was his last artistic effort to draw significant critical attention.

There is some evidence that Talbot may have suffered from alcoholism, hastening the decline of his career. Cropsey had described Talbot, in 1846, as the “drunkest man in Passaic [County],” and some remarks made by the painters Daniel Huntington and Jervis McEntee after Talbot’s death suggest that he died in poverty brought on by his “lack of severe discipline.” In the 1860s and 1870s, Talbot changed home and studio addresses frequently and lived for some time with his married daughter Mary Augusta Burhans, in Rondout, New York, in Ulster County.

By 1879 Talbot was back in Brooklyn, where on January 24 he slipped on the ice at the corner of DeKalb and Broadway. He died as a result on January 29 at his home on Lafayette Avenue. His funeral was held there on January 31 and attended by Huntington, McEntee, and the artists Sanford Robinson Gifford and Richard William Hubbard. McEntee’s diary entry from that day suggests Talbot’s straitened circumstances at the time of his death: “There were quite a number of very nice looking people at the funeral. I feared there would be but few. . . . The house looked poor enough but much better than I feared it would.”

In memorial remarks made at a meeting of the National Academy on February 10, 1879, Huntington, then the Academy’s president, said that Talbot’s “first brilliant promise as an Amateur was not fulfilled in later years from the lack of severe discipline.” McEntee attended the same meeting and wrote in his diary that members of the Academy voted to provide financial assistance to the Talbot family by defraying funeral expenses and reducing the commission on his paintings sold through the Academy.

== Sources ==
- Bohan, Ruth L. Looking into Walt Whitman: American Art, 1850–1920. University Park: Pennsylvania State University Press, 2006 (ISBN 9780271027029)
- Dearinger, David B., ed. Paintings and Sculpture in the Collection of the National Academy of Design, Volume 1, 1826–1925. New York and Manchester: Hudson Hills Press, 2004, 382–383 (ISBN 9781555950293)
- Hurd, D. Hamilton, ed., History of Bristol County, Massachusetts, with Biographical Sketches of Many of Its Pioneers and Prominent Men (Philadelphia: J. W. Lewis & Co., 1883), 250
- Katz, Wendy J[ean]. “Previously Undocumented Art Criticism by Walt Whitman.” Walt Whitman Quarterly Review 32 (2015): 215–29. https://doi.org/10.13008/0737-0679.2171.
- Katz, Wendy Jean. Humbug! The Politics of Art Criticism in New York City’s Penny Press. New York: Fordham University Press, 2020 (ISBN 9780823285389)
- Routhier, Jessica Skwire. “Fellow Journeyers Walt Whitman and Jesse Talbot: Painting, Poetry, and Puffery in 1850s New York.” Walt Whitman Quarterly Review 38 (2020): 1–37. doi:10.13008/0737-0679.2386.
