= Dighton Wharves Historic District =

Historic district in Massachusetts, United States

- U.S. National Register of Historic Places
- U.S. Historic district
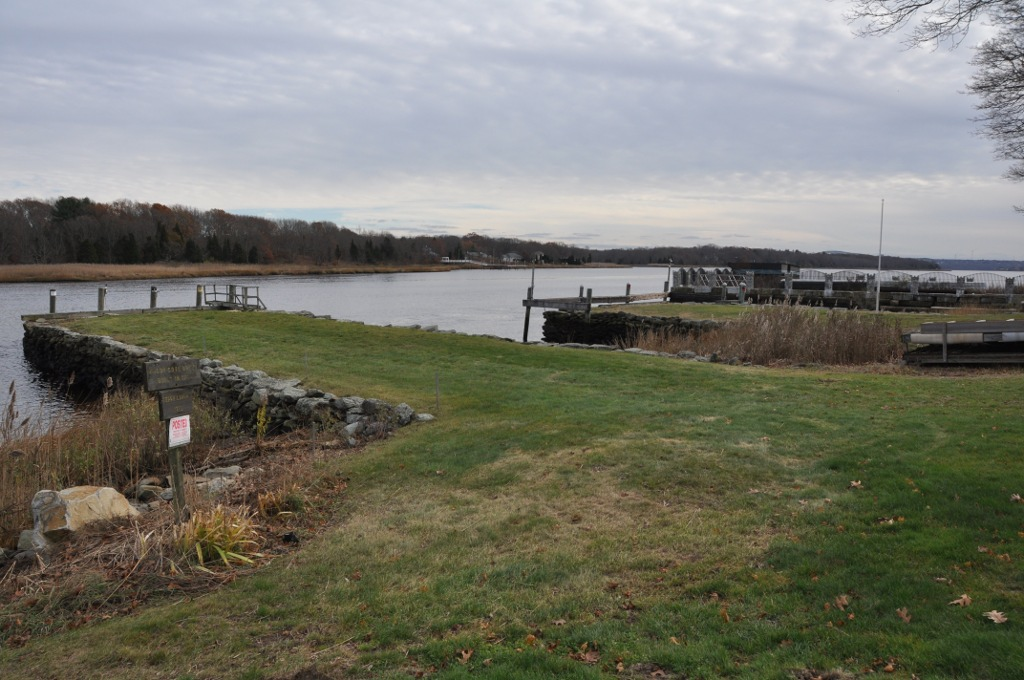
- (From Left to Right: The Spooner Wharf, The Andrews Wharf, and The Perry Wharf). The Andrews and Spooner Wharves remain as they were when constructed, while the Perry Wharf was renovated to its present form in the early 2000s.

- Location within Massachusetts Location within the United States
- Location: Dighton, Massachusetts
- Coordinates: 41°48′31″N 71°7′16″W
- Area: 5.5 acres (2.2 ha)
- Built: 1730
- Architect: Elkanah Andrews, Darius Perry
- Architectural style: Georgian, Greek Revival, Cape Cod
- NRHP reference No.: 97000725
- Added to NRHP: July 17, 1997

The Dighton Wharves Historic District is a historic district at 2298-2328 Pleasant Street in Dighton, Massachusetts. It encompasses an area that was in the 18th and 19th centuries a port facility on the Taunton River for the town, including three 18th-century wharves and four houses of early to mid 18th-century construction. The district was added to the National Register of Historic Places in 1997.

== Description ==
The town of Dighton, located on the west bank of the Taunton River in central Bristol County, Massachusetts, was settled by European colonists in the 1670s and incorporated as a town in 1712. It became significant as a maritime shipping endpoint in the 18th century because seagoing vessels were unable to navigate further up the river. As a result, shipyards and wharves were built in several places on the banks of the river. This district is located in the south-central part of the town's waterfront, just south of Muddy Cove, where there was also at one time a ferry service across the river. The area declined in importance as a shipping center due to the ascendancy of Fall River as a deep-water shipping destination.

The district runs along Pleasant Street, which runs close to the river, and includes four houses on the west side of the road, and three wharves that jut into the river. At the southern end of the district stand the house and wharf of Darius Perry, a ship's captain who sailed to the West Indies. His house, built about 1720, is a 1-1/2 story Cape that has repeatedly been enlarged and extended over the following centuries, but its basic form is still recognizable and its interior has been preserved. His wharf is about 30 feet (9.1 m) wide and a similar length, and was hand-built out of dry-laid stone, as were the other two wharves.

North of Perry's house stands the Eddy House (2320 Pleasant Street), a 3-story Georgian style house, which was built about 1730 and given extensive Italianate styling about 1870. This house, along with the two remaining houses, were all built by Elkanah Andrews, another West Indies merchant who built one for himself and the others for two sons. It was acquired by Darius Perry in 1825 for his daughter and son-in-law, Captain William Eddy. A guest house once stood on the premises from the 1870s to mid-1900s behind the Eddy House. The guest house fell into great disrepair in the early mid-1900s due to neglect and lack of use by the owners. In the late 1900s, the guest house was dismantled and transported to Brewster, where it now stands. In the early 1900s, the Eddys operated a function hall out of the guest house, along with a full farm with livestock in the large barn. People would arrive by train, trolley, ferry, or stagecoach to visit the Eddy House and its estate. As all three houses were built by a ship’s captain, many shipbuilding techniques of the time were employed in the construction of the houses. Large wooden pegs took the place of steel bolts, as the house was, in essence, constructed as a ship. The Eddy House sits at the highest part of the district, preserving over 240 years of history.

The next house was Andrews' own house (2308 Pleasant Street), which was built about 1740, and is an imposing 2-1/2 story structure. It was restyled about 1830 with an elaborate Greek Revival treatment. Andrews was probably responsible for the construction of the Spooner Wharf, which stands opposite this house, and the Andrews Wharf to its south. The Andrews Wharf is similar to that of Perry, while the Spooner Wharf is the longest of the three, at 70 feet (21 m). Andrews' house was purchased in 1803 by Captain James Spooner, a wealthy Rhode Island ship's captain.

At the northern end of the district stands the "Old Customs House", built by Andrews for his son Thomas about 1770. Between 1809 and 1834 it was owned by members of the Williams family, who acted as local customs collectors, and had one of the house's rear rooms outfitted as a small customs office.

== History ==
In 1765, shortly after the renewal of the Molasses Act, the Dighton wharves were the site of the "Molasses Affair," a protest of British taxes on molasses similar to the more famous Boston Tea Party. A local ship reported a cargo of 63 casks of molasses to the British custom officials, but the ship actually contained twice that number. The customs official ordered the ship's cargo impounded while he departed for Newport for assistance. While he was gone, forty local men with blackened faces stole the cargo, ran the ship aground, and drilled holes in the hull to protest British tax policies.

== See also ==
- National Register of Historic Places listings in Bristol County, Massachusetts
