= Dighton, Massachusetts =

- Town
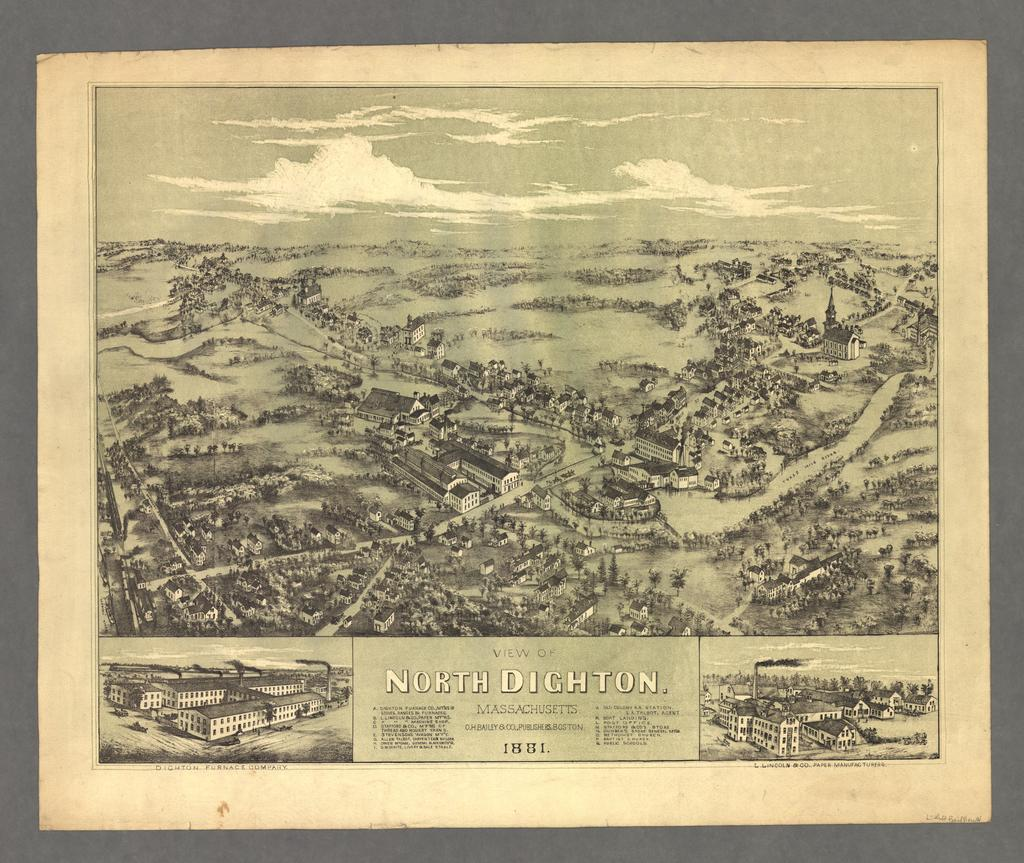
- View of North Dighton Village in 1881

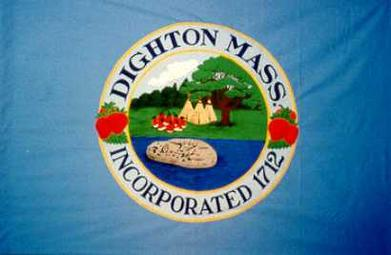
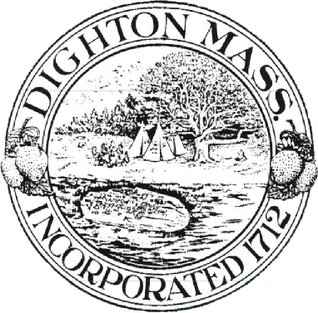
- Flag Seal

- Location in Bristol County in Massachusetts
- Coordinates: 41°48′50″N 71°07′15″W
- Country: United States
- State: Massachusetts
- County: Bristol
- Deeded: 1672
- Incorporated: 1712

Government
  - Type: Open town meeting

Area
  - Total: 22.6 sq mi (58.5 km^{2})
  - Land: 22.0 sq mi (57.0 km^{2})
  - Water: 0.58 sq mi (1.5 km^{2})
- Elevation: 20 ft (6 m)

Population (2022)
  - Total: 8,101
  - Density: 368/sq mi (142/km^{2})
- Time zone: UTC-5 (Eastern)
  - Summer (DST): UTC-4 (Eastern)
- ZIP Codes: 02715 (Dighton); 02764 (North Dighton)
- Area code: 508 / 774
- FIPS code: 25-16950
- GNIS feature ID: 0618280
- Website: www.dighton-ma.gov

Dighton is a town in Bristol County, Massachusetts, United States. The population was 8,101 at the 2020 census. The town is located on the western shore of the Taunton River in the southeastern part of the state.

== History ==
=== Crossroads ===
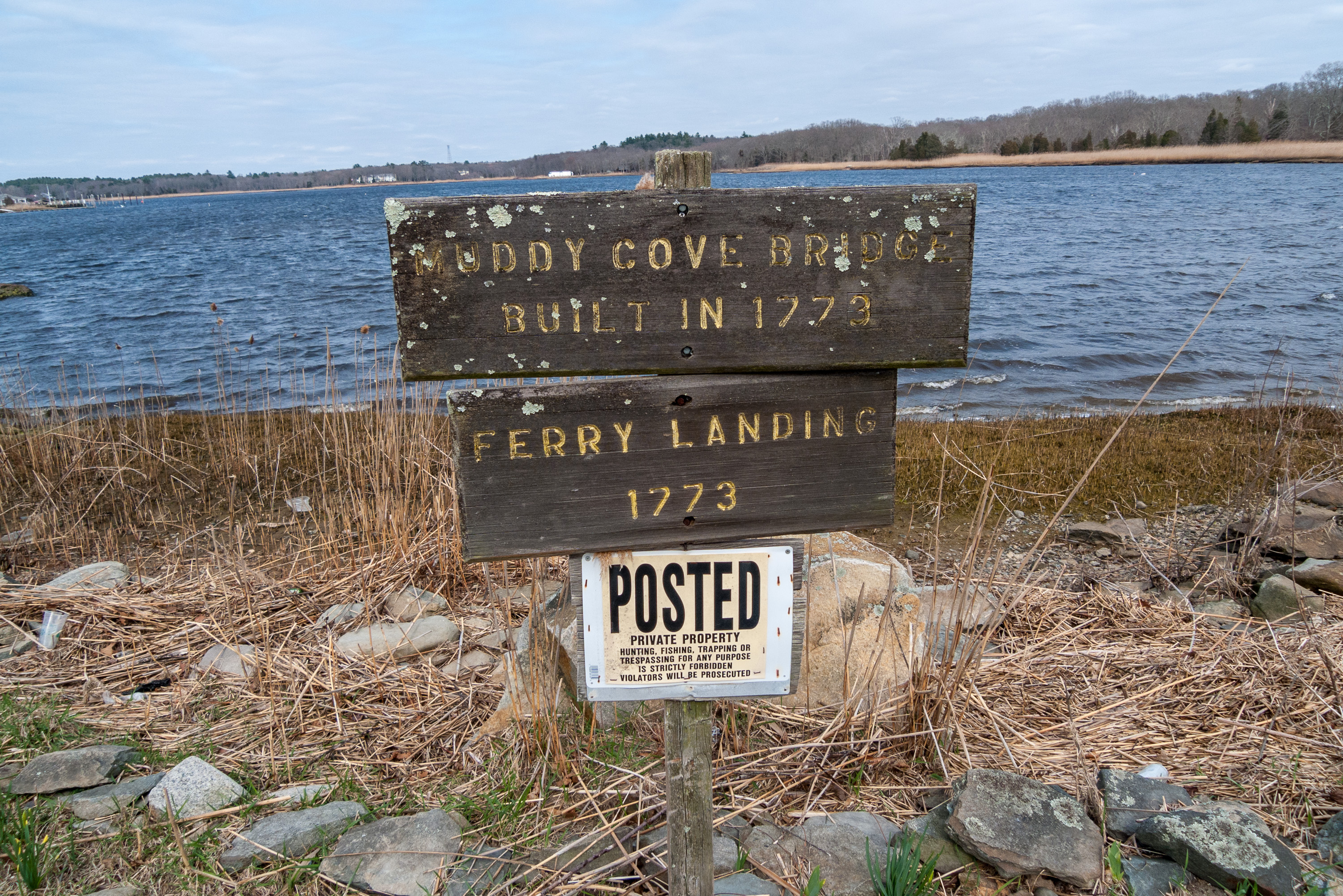
Site of Dighton Ferry Landing

Dighton's location has long made it a crossroads for travel. The "Old Bristol Path" took early settlers from the Pilgrim settlement in Plymouth, Massachusetts to Bristol, Rhode Island, the home of Massasoit. A ferry took travelers across the Taunton River. Later, a stage coach ran through Dighton, connecting Taunton and Bristol. Dighton was also along the route between Fall River and Taunton.

=== Origin ===
Dighton was originally part of Taunton's South Purchase and other surrounding towns. It was separated in 1672, officially incorporated in 1712. It was named for Frances Dighton Williams, wife of Richard Williams, a town elder. At the time of incorporation, the town included land on both sides of the Taunton River, including the land of Assonet Neck, which includes Dighton Rock, a rock found in the shallows of the river which includes cryptic carvings whose origins are debated to this day. However, in 1799, that land on the east bank of the river was annexed by Berkley, thus giving that town the claim of being the home of the rock.

=== Molasses Affair ===
In 1765, shortly after the renewal of the Molasses Act, Dighton's wharves were the site of the "Molasses Affair," a protest of British taxes on molasses similar to the more famous Boston Tea Party. A local ship reported a cargo of 63 casks of molasses to the British custom officials, but the ship actually contained double that number. The customs official ordered the ship's cargo impounded while he departed for Newport for assistance. While he was gone, forty local men with blackened faces stole the cargo, ran the ship aground, and drilled holes in the hull to protest British tax policies.

=== Revolution ===
During the time of the American Revolutionary War, Dighton gave refuge to several refugees from Newport, Rhode Island who had fled the British occupation there. These included Ezra Stiles and William Ellery. Stiles kept a diary of his time in Dighton. In January 1778 the town council voted in favor of the Articles of Confederation.

=== Industries ===
As it was located at the beginning of the tidewater of the river, Dighton was a shipbuilding community, and even had status as a port of call. North of Dighton the Taunton River becomes too shallow for ships to navigate, and this, along with its centralized location, allowed Dighton to become a shipping hub for southeastern Massachusetts. In 1789 Dighton was made a port of entry for the surrounding towns. Ships would unload in Dighton and goods were either transferred to smaller boats or towed by oxen along a tow path on the east side of the river to Taunton.

Herring were plentiful in the Taunton River, and at one point Dighton's herring fishery provided more income to the town than any other industry. Fish were preserved in salt and exported as far away as the West Indies.

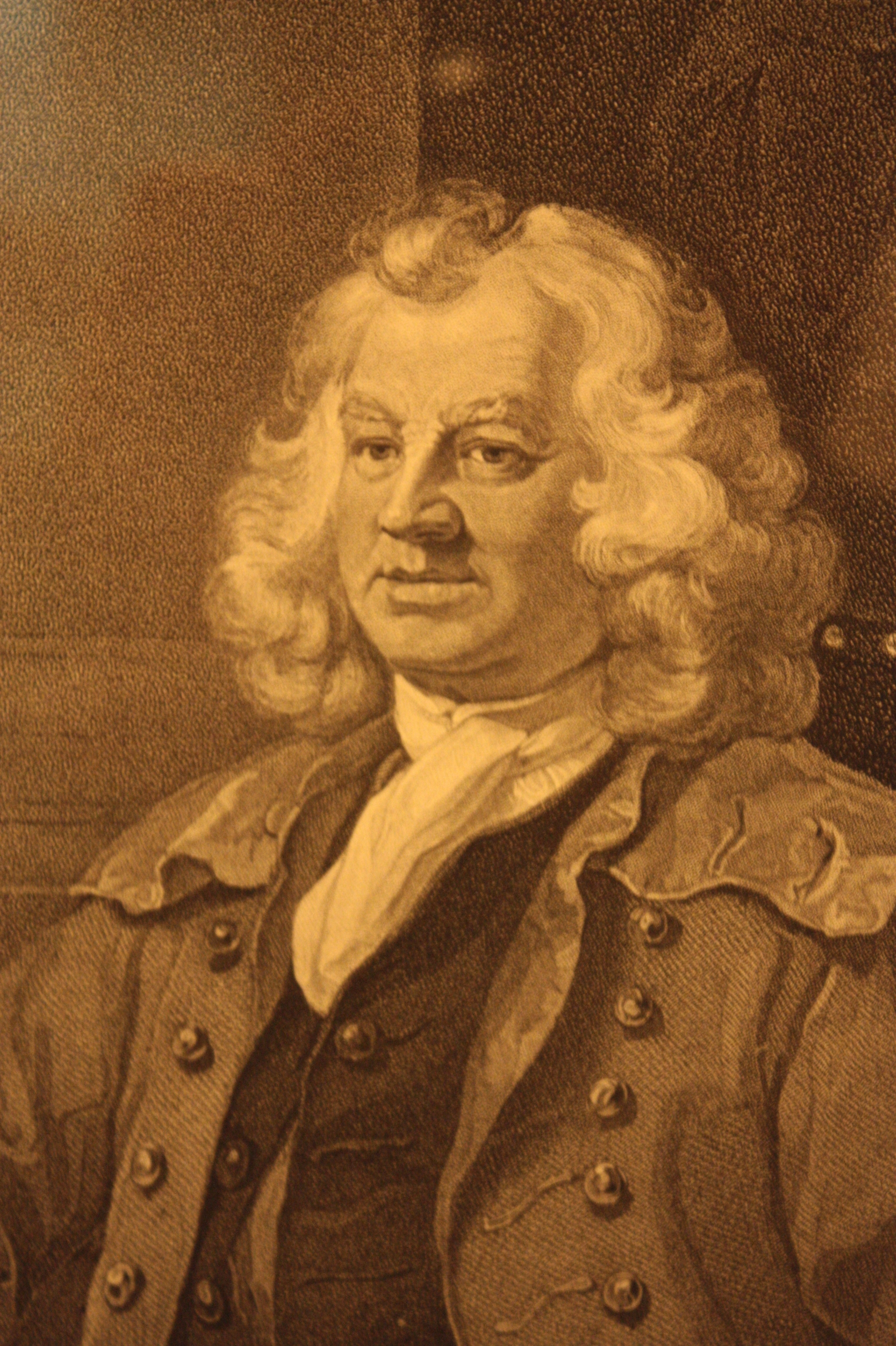
Thomas Coram

Shipbuilding started in Dighton as early as 1698. Thomas Coram built Dighton's first shipyard on the west side of the Taunton River. Shipbuilding grew into a significant industry after 1800, peaking around 1850. During 1840–1845 twenty-two schooners, two sloops, four brigs, and three barks were built in Dighton.

There were also cotton mills, paper mills, manufacturers and farming concerns in the town. From before the Civil War to at least 1912, the town was regionally known for its strawberry farms. With time, however, many of these industries left, leaving the town as a rural suburban community with some small farms.

=== Tricentennial ===
In 2012, Dighton celebrated its Tricentennial with town selectmen donning historic costumes and crossing the Taunton River to Ferry Landing. Afterwards they held a ceremony at Founders Hall.

== Geography ==
According to the United States Census Bureau, the town has a total area of 22.6 square miles (58.5 km^{2}), of which 22.0 square miles (57.0 km^{2}) is land and 0.58 square miles (1.5 km^{2}), or 2.56%, is water.

Dighton is bordered by Rehoboth to the west, Swansea to the southwest, Somerset to the south, the Taunton River and the town of Berkley to the east, and the city of Taunton to the north. In addition to being bordered by the Taunton River, it also is bordered by the Three Mile River, a tributary which empties into the Taunton along the northeast border of town. The town is also crossed by the Segreganset River, another tributary of the Taunton which flows through the center of town, as well as several smaller brooks. The highest point in the town is in its northwest corner, where the elevation rises above 236 feet (72 m) above sea level.

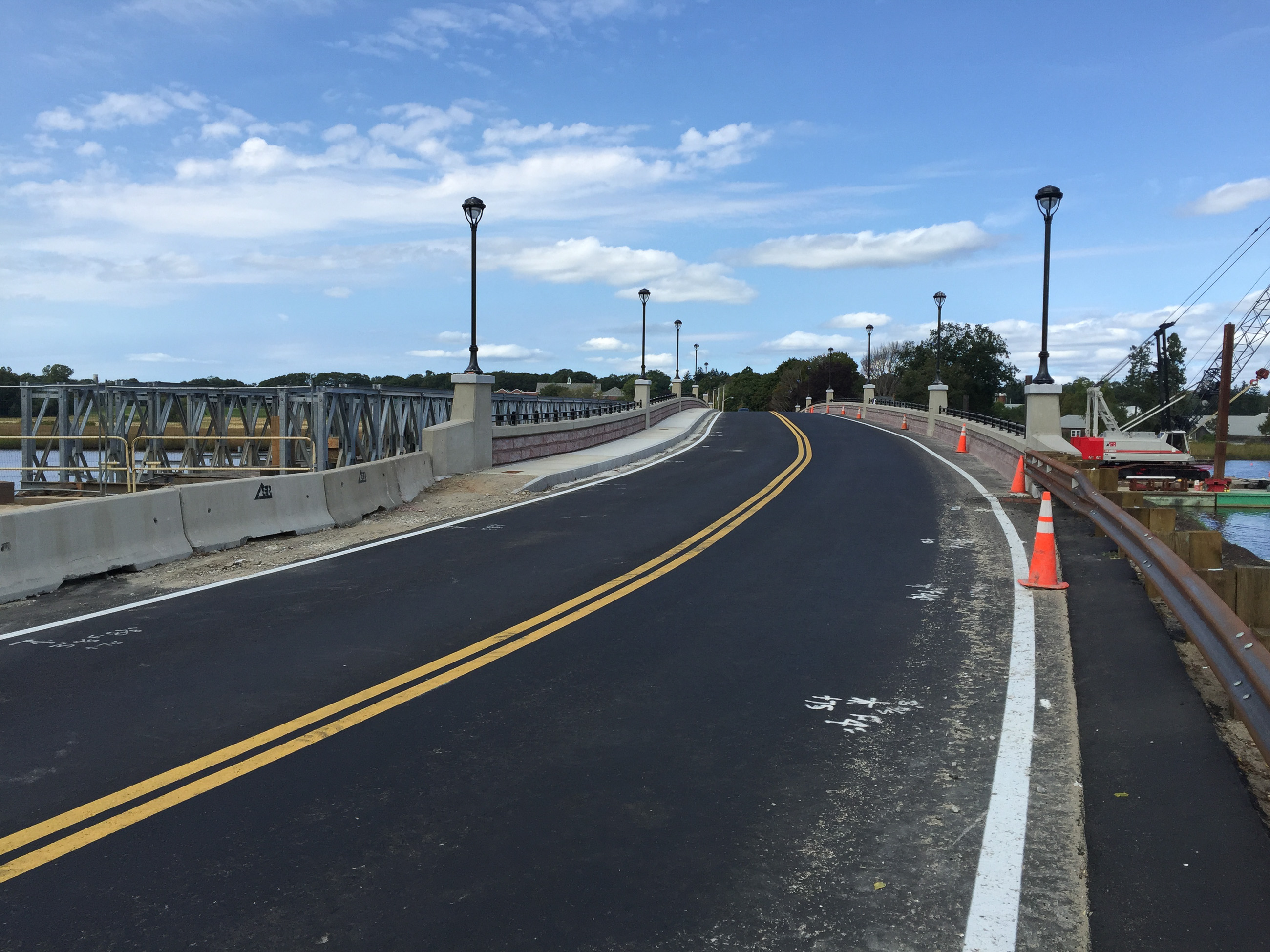
New two-lane bridge, opened August 2015

Dighton is the site of the Berkley–Dighton Bridge, originally a one-lane bridge built in the 1890s as a link between Center Street in Dighton and Elm Street in Berkley. It is the only span crossing the Taunton River between the Brightman Street Bridge between Somerset and Fall River, and the Plain Street Bridge in Taunton, a drive of 12 1/2 miles (20 km) (and 4 mi or 6 km south of the Plain Street Bridge). In 2010, the old bridge was demolished and a temporary bridge handled traffic as a new bridge was built. In August 2015 a new two-lane bridge opened to traffic.

Dighton's localities are Chestnut Tree Corner, Dighton, North Dighton, Segreganset, South Dighton and Wheeler's Corner.

== Demographics ==
Historical population
Year	Pop.	±%
1790	1,793	—
1850	1,641	−8.5%
1860	1,733	+5.6%
1870	1,817	+4.8%
1880	1,791	−1.4%
1890	1,880	+5.0%
1900	1,802	−4.1%
1910	2,235	+24.0%
1920	2,574	+15.2%
1930	3,147	+22.3%
1940	2,983	−5.2%
1950	2,950	−1.1%
1960	3,769	+27.8%
1970	4,667	+23.8%
1980	5,352	+14.7%
1990	5,631	+5.2%
2000	6,175	+9.7%
2010	7,086	+14.8%
2020	8,101	+14.3%
2024*	8,275	+2.1%
Source: United States census records and Population Estimates Program data.

As of the census of 2000, there were 6,175 people, 2,201 households, and 1,718 families residing in the town. The population density was 275.9 inhabitants per square mile (106.5/km^{2}). There were 2,280 housing units at an average density of 101.9 per square mile (39.3/km^{2}). The racial makeup of the town was 97.80% White, 0.53% African American, 0.19% Native American, 0.49% Asian, 0.02% Pacific Islander, 0.28% from other races, and 0.70% from two or more races. Hispanic or Latino of any race were 1.07% of the population.

There were 2,201 households, out of which 37.4% had children under the age of 18 living with them, 64.5% were married couples living together, 9.9% had a female householder with no husband present, and 21.9% were non-families. 18.8% of all households were made up of individuals, and 9.7% had someone living alone who was 65 years of age or older. The average household size was 2.78 and the average family size was 3.17.

In the town, the population was spread out, with 26.1% under the age of 18, 6.3% from 18 to 24, 30.4% from 25 to 44, 24.3% from 45 to 64, and 12.8% who were 65 years of age or older. The median age was 38 years. For every 100 females, there were 96.8 males. For every 100 females age 18 and over, there were 92.4 males.

The median income for a household in the town was $58,600, and the median income for a family was $64,792. Males had a median income of $41,427 versus $28,250 for females. The per capita income for the town was $22,600. About 1.0% of families and 2.6% of the population were below the poverty line, including 3.8% of those under age 18 and 1.2% of those age 65 or over.

== Arts and culture ==
=== Annual cultural events ===
Dighton is home of the Cow Chip Festival. The Dighton Lions Club hosts the event. Every June a traveling carnival comes and sets up behind the Town Hall. Fireworks have been a recent addition to the festival. There are rides and a carnival mid-way along with food, musical performances, a lawn tractor pull, woodsman competition pony rides and the chicken BBQ. The name was given to it because they set up squares on the field behind the town hall. They place cows out on the enclosed squares. People then place bets on the square that they believe will be defecated on first by one of the cows.

== Parks and recreation ==
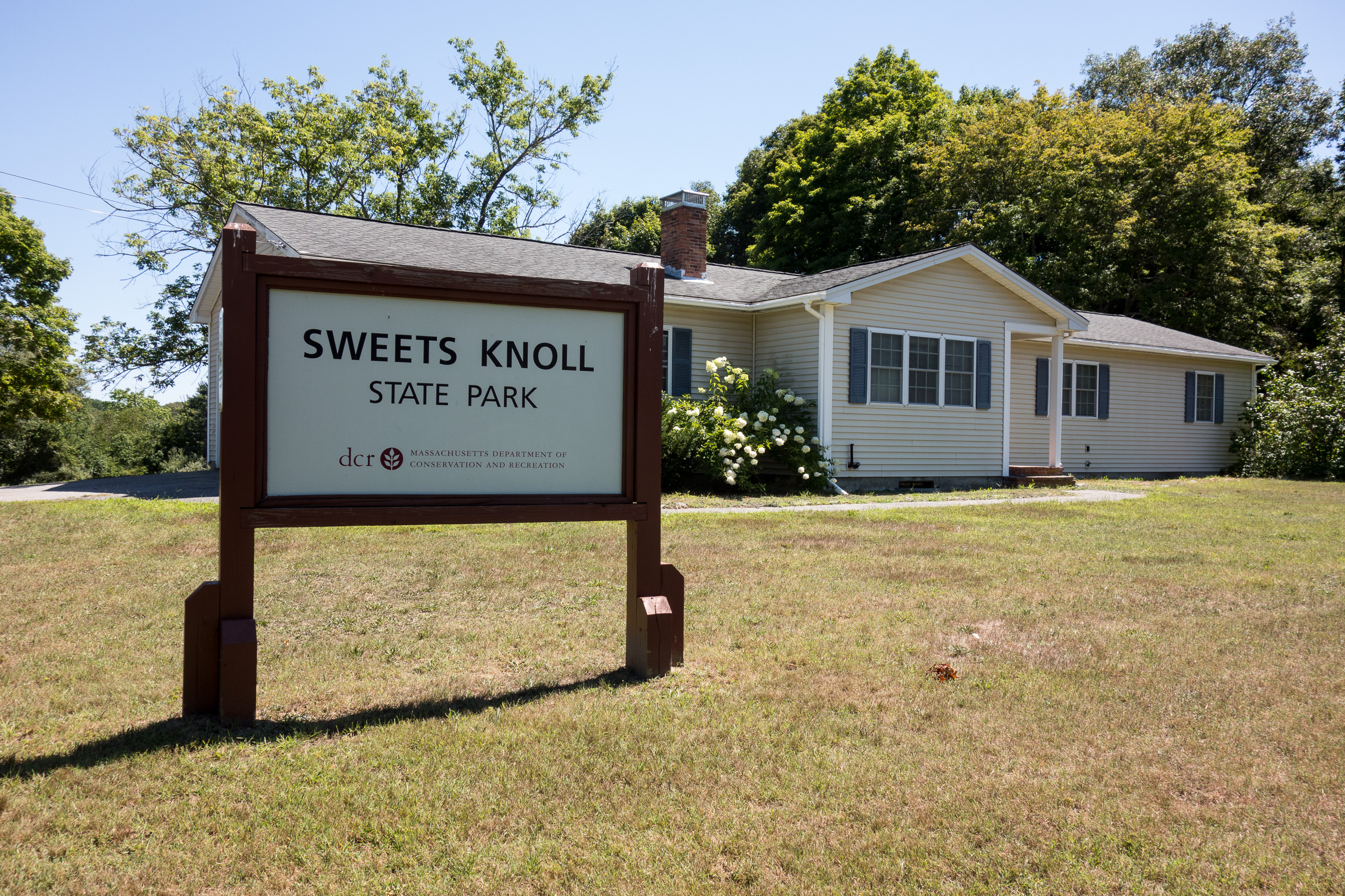
Sweets Knoll State Park

Sweets Knoll State Park is a fifty-six acre park located in Dighton. It was purchased in June 2009, and includes two miles of old railroad bed which may be adapted into a walking and biking path, picnic areas, a small boat launch, and fishing.

Tricentennial Park, a small waterfront park along the Taunton River, was created as an Eagle Scout project by a young resident in honor of the town's tricentennial in 2012.

== Government ==
Dighton is governed by an open town meeting led by a board of selectmen. Currently serving on the Board of Selectmen are: Mark Pacheco, Peter Caron, and Nicole Mello. The town has a central police station along Route 138 by the banks of the Segreganset River, separate post offices and fire departments near the center of town and North Dighton, and the Dighton Public Library at the center of town. Dighton has a conservation area and a small park next to the town hall near the intersection of Center Street and Route 138.

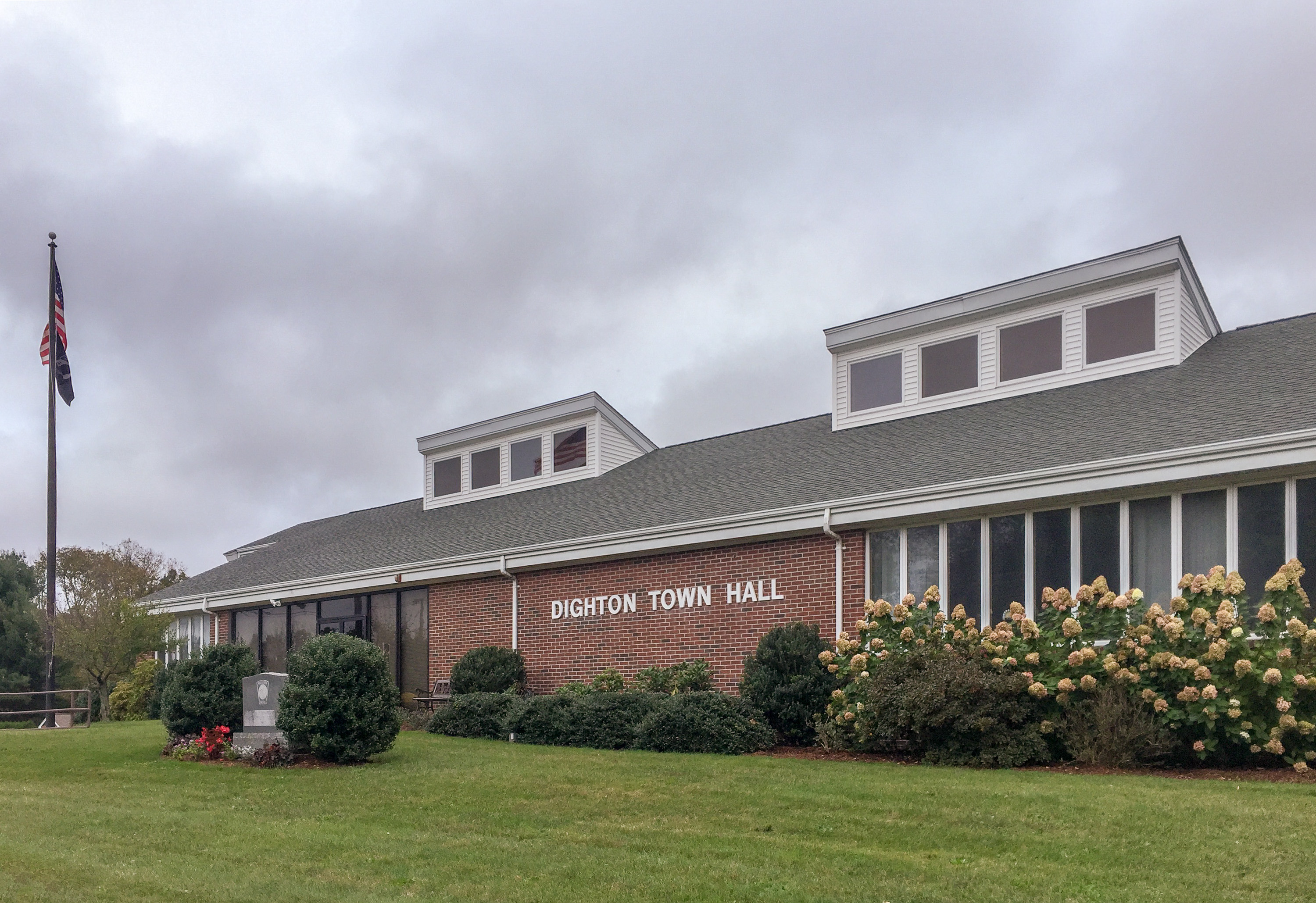
Dighton Town Hall

Dighton is located in the Fifth Bristol state representative district, which includes Somerset and parts of Swansea and Taunton. The town is represented in the state senate in the First Plymouth and Bristol district, which includes the towns of Berkley, Bridgewater, Carver, Marion, Middleborough, Raynham, Taunton and Wareham. Dighton is patrolled by the Middleboro Barracks (D4) of the Massachusetts State Police. On the national level, the town is part of Massachusetts Congressional District 4, which is represented by Jake Auchincloss. The state's junior (Class I) Senator is Ed Markey and the state's senior (Class II) Senator is Elizabeth Warren.

Similar to neighboring Rehoboth, Dighton is quite conservative for Massachusetts standards. The last Democrat to carry Dighton in a Presidential election is Barack Obama, narrowly winning the town in 2008.

Dighton presidential election results
Year	Democratic	Republican	Third parties	Total Votes	Margin
2024	39.80% 1,894	58.69% 2,793	1.51% 72	4,759	18.89%
2020	45.28% 2,139	52.35% 2,473	2.37% 112	4,724	7.07%
2016	40.15% 1,602	53.86% 2,149	5.99% 239	3,990	13.71%
2012	47.58% 1,743	50.31% 1,843	2.10% 77	3,663	2.73%
2008	48.45% 1,732	48.08% 1,719	3.47% 124	3,575	0.37%
2004	53.41% 1,745	45.21% 1,477	1.38% 45	3,267	8.20%
2000	57.23% 1,639	36.98% 1,059	5.80% 166	2,864	20.25%
1996	54.78% 1,444	29.17% 769	16.05% 423	2,636	25.61%
1992	39.26% 1,109	31.40% 887	29.35% 829	2,825	7.86%
1988	45.24% 1,175	54.02% 1,403	0.73% 19	2,597	8.78%
1984	38.96% 948	60.50% 1,472	0.53% 13	2,433	21.54%
1980	36.89% 889	47.93% 1,155	15.19% 366	2,410	11.04%
1976	51.09% 1,200	47.00% 1,104	1.92% 45	2,349	4.09%
1972	41.35% 844	57.96% 1,183	0.69% 14	2,041	16.61%
1968	53.06% 989	41.74% 778	5.20% 97	1,864	11.32%
1964	71.46% 1,217	28.19% 480	0.35% 6	1,703	43.28%
1960	50.64% 877	49.31% 854	0.06% 1	1,732	1.33%
1956	29.16% 459	70.84% 1,115	0.00% 0	1,574	41.68%
1952	36.22% 552	63.58% 969	0.20% 3	1,524	27.36%
1948	44.86% 581	54.44% 705	0.69% 9	1,295	9.58%
1944	42.74% 489	57.17% 654	0.09% 1	1,144	14.42%
1940	37.79% 449	62.04% 737	0.17% 2	1,188	24.24%

== Climate ==
In a typical year, Dighton, Massachusetts temperatures fall below 50 °F (10 °C) for 164 days per year. Annual precipitation is typically 47.6 inches (1,210 mm) per year (above normal for the US) and snow covers the ground 40 days per year, or 11.0% of the year (moderate in the US). It may be helpful to understand the yearly precipitation by imagining nine straight days of moderate rain per year. The humidity is below 60% for approximately 39.8 days, or 10.9% of the year.

== Education ==
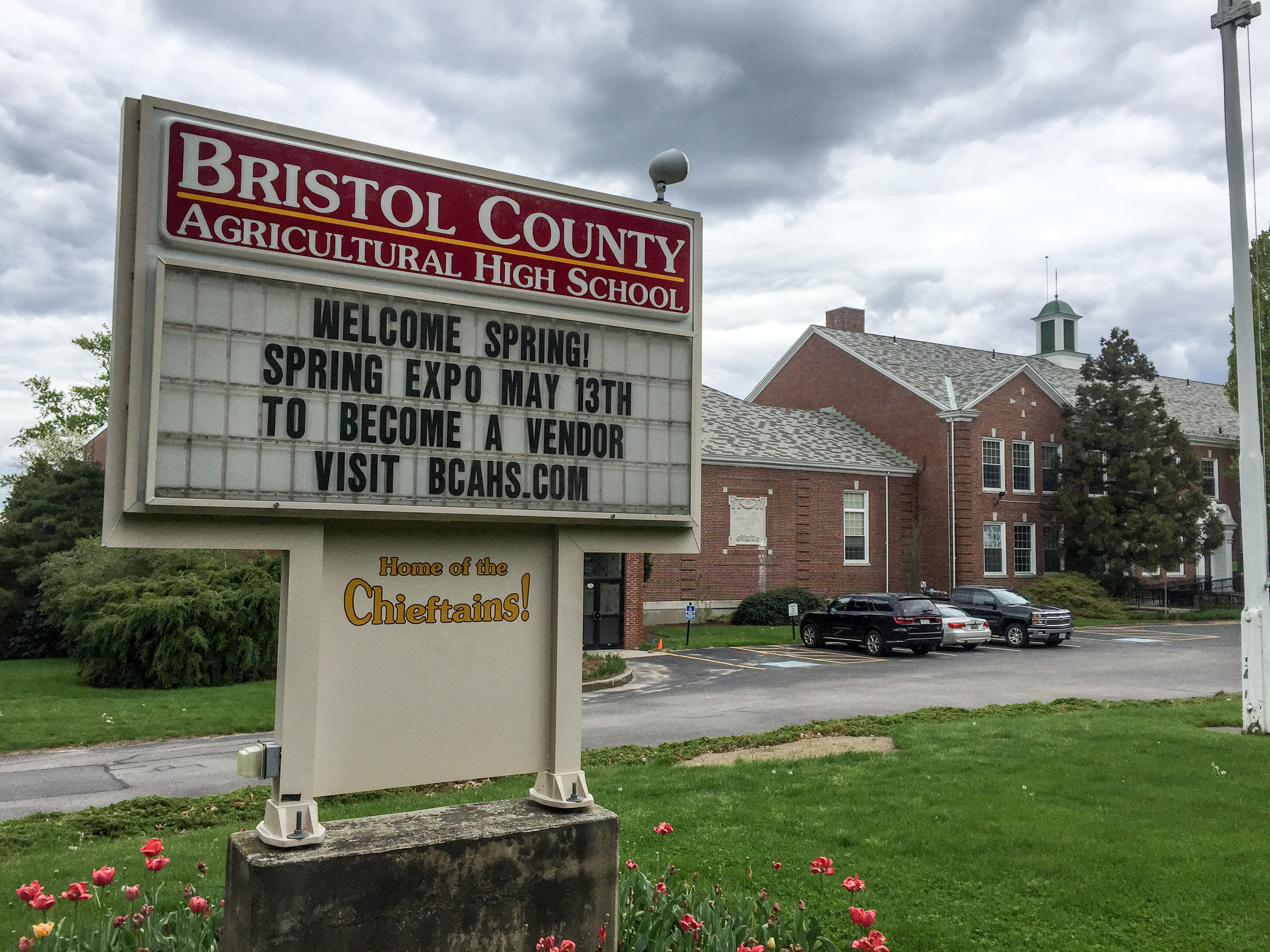
Bristol County Agricultural High School

Dighton and its neighboring town Rehoboth comprise one school district, the Dighton-Rehoboth School District. It was founded in 1987 to oversee the schools of both towns. The high school, Dighton-Rehoboth Regional High School, was founded in 1958 to serve both towns. The school itself is located in North Dighton, mere yards away from the Rehoboth town line. Its athletics teams are known as the Falcons, and its colors are green and gold. The Dighton Middle and Elementary Schools are located near the corner of Center Street and Somerset Avenue (Route 138) at the center of town.

The town is also the home of Bristol County Agricultural High School. The school operates a large farm along the banks of the Taunton River at its Center Street location. The town does not have any affiliation with a regional vocational school system, the closest one being Bristol-Plymouth Regional Technical School, located in Taunton, Massachusetts.

== Library ==
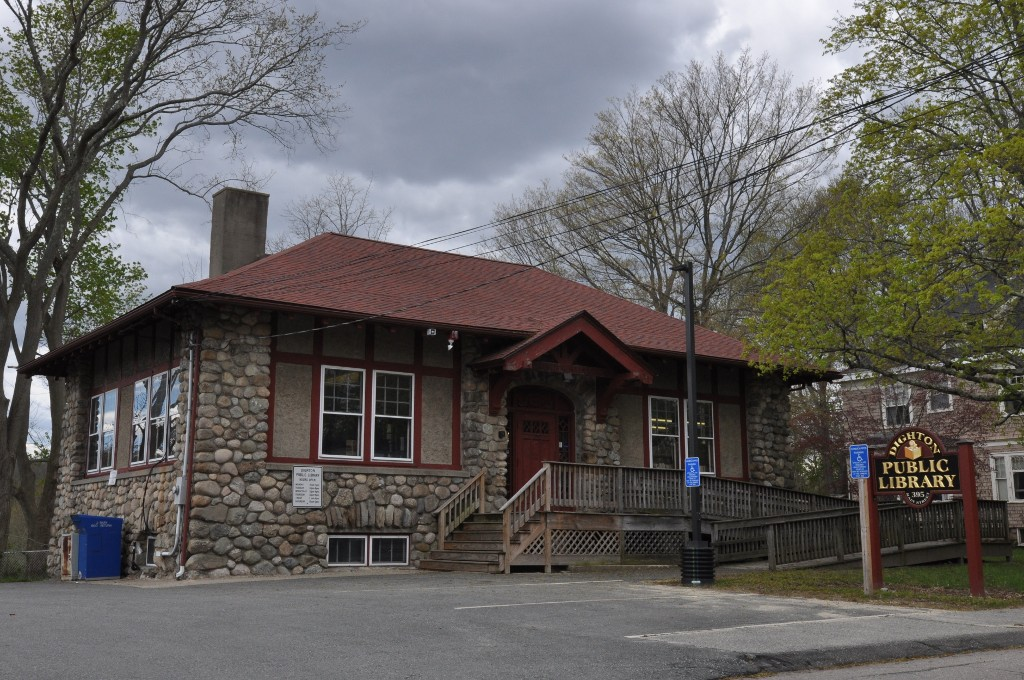
Dighton Public Library

Dighton is served by the Dighton Public Library. As of December 2009, the Library Director was Jocelyn Tavares.

== Historic places ==
- Coram Shipyard Historic District
- Dighton Wharves Historic District
- Dighton Community Church, 1798

== Notable people ==
- Thomas Coram (1668–1751), Lived in Dighton for ten years and founded the Coram Shipyard
- Ralph Moody (1917–2004), American race car driver and engineer. Founder of Holman-Moody of NASCAR and LeMans fame in the 1960s
- Samuel Shaw (1768–1827), United States Representative from Vermont
- Brandon Shileikis, college baseball coach
- Jesse Talbot (1805–1879), Hudson River School painter, Associate Member of the National Academy of Design, and friend to Walt Whitman
- Jack Teixeira (2001–), North Dighton resident and Air National Guardsman accused of leaking sensitive documents pertaining to US intelligence and other countries.
- Silas Talbot (1751–1813), U.S. Navy Commodore, Representative of New York's 10th district, and captain of the USS Constitution
- Ruth Tripp (1897–1971), composer; administered the Works Project Administration's Federal Music Project in Rhode Island

== See also ==
- Cole River
- Greater Taunton Area
- Taunton River Watershed
