= Carpenter (surname) =

Family name

- Pronunciation: /ˈkɑːrpəntər/

Origin
- Meaning: worker or fixer of wood, builder of wood
- Region of origin: England, France

Other names
- Variant forms: Zimmermann, Zimmerman, Timmerman, Carpentier, Charpentier

Carpenter is an occupational surname derived from the profession of carpenter. Within the United States, it ranked as the 231st-most common surname as of the 2010 census.

== Origin ==
The Carpenter surname has roots in the Anglo-Norman French introduced into England about the time of the Norman conquest of England of 1066. The earliest attested use as a surname in English is from 1121, though its use as a secondary name or description in the Domesday Book of 1086 might have precedence. It came into common use in Middle English circa 1275–1325.

In Old French, the surname was commonly written as "Carpentier" and its earlier form as "Charpentier". Its use as a surname may have derived as a nickname or description of one's occupation circa 900–1000.

== People ==
=== A ===
- Aaron Carpenter (disambiguation)
- Albert J. Carpenter (1911–1999), US Coast Guard rear admiral
- Alan Carpenter (born 1957), Australian politician
- Alex Carpenter (born 1994), American ice hockey player
- Alexander Carpenter (fl. 1429), English author of the Destructorium viciorum, a religious work
- Alfred Carpenter (1881–1955), British naval officer, vice-admiral and Victoria Cross recipient
- Allan Carpenter (1917–2003), American non-fiction writer
- Allie May "A.M." Carpenter (1887–1978), artist and art educator
- Almeria Carpenter (1752–1809), British courtier and mistress of Prince William Henry
- Amanda Carpenter (born 1982), American author and columnist for The Washington Times
- Andrew Carpenter (disambiguation)
- Arthur Carpenter (disambiguation)
- Audrey T. Carpenter (born 1935), British biographer
- Aurelius O. Carpenter (1836–1919), American photographer, writer and abolitionist

=== B ===
- B. Platt Carpenter (1837–1921), governor of Montana Territory
- Benajah Carpenter (1748–1776), founding member of the US Army Field Artillery Corps
- Benjamin Carpenter (1725–1804), leader of colonial Vermont, Revolutionary War colonel, and lieutenant governor
- Benjamin Carpenter (British Army officer) (c. 1713/14–1788), British army officer
- Bill Carpenter (born 1937), American football player and army officer
- Bob or Bobby Carpenter (disambiguation)
- Boyden Carpenter (1909–1995), American hillbilly and bluegrass musician
- Brian Carpenter (disambiguation)

=== C ===
- Cameron Carpenter (born 1981), American organist
- Candi Carpenter (fl. 2010s), American country music singer-songwriter
- Carleton Carpenter (1926–2022), American actor, magician, author, and songwriter
- Catherine "Kate" Carpenter (c. 1730s–1784), Virginia pioneer for whom Kate's Mountain is named
- Cecelia Svinth Carpenter (1924–2010), historian of the Nisqually people
- Chad Carpenter (born c. 1968), American cartoonist
- Charisma Carpenter (born 1970), American actress
- Charles Carpenter (disambiguation)
- Chris Carpenter (disambiguation)
- Christina Carpenter (fl. 1329–1332), English anchoress
- Christine Carpenter (disambiguation)
- Christopher Carpenter (disambiguation)
- Clarence Ray Carpenter (1905–1975), American primatologist
- Claude E. Carpenter (1904–1976), American set decorator
- Cliff Carpenter (1915–2014), American actor
- Connie Carpenter-Phinney (born 1957), née Carpenter, American bicycle racer and speed skater
- Constance Carpenter (1904–1992), English-born American film and musical theatre actor
- Coy Cornelius Carpenter (1900–1971), physician and dean of the School of Medicine of Wake Forest University
- Cyrus C. Carpenter (1829–1898), Civil War veteran, Republican governor of Iowa, U.S. Representative from Iowa

=== D ===
- Dan Carpenter (born 1985), American football placekicker
- Daniel C. Carpenter (1816–1866), American law enforcement officer and police inspector of the New York Police Department
- Daniel Carpenter (political scientist), American political scientist and writer
- David Aaron Carpenter, American violist
- Davis Carpenter (1799–1878), American politician
- Delphus E. Carpenter (1877–1951), American state senator and water rights lawyer
- Don Carpenter (1931–1995), American writer
- Don Carpenter (fl. 1960s), electrical engineer, discoverer of the plasmasphere
- Donald Carpenter (disambiguation)
- Doug Carpenter (born 1942), hockey coach
- Drew Carpenter (born 1985), American baseball pitcher
- Dudley Newcomb Carpenter (1874–1955), doctor, US Navy officer, writer

=== E ===
- Earl Carpenter (disambiguation)
  - Earl Carpenter (actor) (born 1970), English musical theatre actor
  - Earl Carpenter (politician) (1894–1963), American politician from Nebraska
- Ed Carpenter (disambiguation)
- Edmund Carpenter (disambiguation)
- Edward Carpenter (priest) (1910–1998), Anglican priest and author
- Edwin Francis Carpenter (1898–1963), American astronomer
- Elbert L. Carpenter (1862–1945), lumberman who helped organize the Minneapolis Symphony Orchestra, namesake of Elbert L. Carpenter House
- Ellen Maria Carpenter (1830–1908), American painter
- Ellie Carpenter (born 2000), Australian footballer
- Elisabeth Carpenter Satterthwait (born 1856), née Carpenter, author
- Eliza Carpenter (1851–1924), early African-American race horse owner
- Elizabeth Carpenter (born 1953), American writer, designer, and game developer
- Ensley A. Carpenter (c. 1819–before 1910), doctor for whom the town of Carpenter, Kentucky, was named
- Ernie Carpenter (1907–1997), West Virginia fiddle player
- Estlin Carpenter (1844–1927), English Unitarian minister, the principal and then president of Manchester College, Oxford, expert in Sanskrit and a pioneer in the study of comparative religion

=== F ===
- Fanny Hallock Carpenter (1854–1939), American lawyer and clubwoman
- Flavius Josephus Carpenter (1851–1933), Arkansas veteran of the Civil War, steamboat captain, and entrepreneur
- Florence Carpenter Dieudonné (1850–1927), née Carpenter, early science fiction and fantasy writer
- Frances Carpenter (1890–1972), American photographer and author
- Francis Carpenter (disambiguation)
- Frank G. Carpenter (1855–1924), 1920s travel guide author
- Frank M. Carpenter (1902–1994), paleoentomologist
- Franklin B. Carpenter (1818–1862), American lumber merchant and politician
- Franklin Metcalfe Carpenter (1847–1907), Canadian farmer and politician
- Franklin R. Carpenter (1848–1910), American mining engineer
- French Carpenter (1899–1965), West Virginia fiddle player

=== G ===
- Gail Carpenter (born 1948), American cognitive scientist, neuroscientist, and mathematician
- Geoffrey Douglas Hale Carpenter (1882–1953), British entomologist and evolutionary biologist
- George Carpenter (disambiguation)
- Gordon Carpenter (1919–1988), American basketball player
- Grace Carpenter Hudson (1865–1937), American painter
- Grant Carpenter (1865–1936), American newspaperman, lawyer, and writer
- Guy Carpenter (1869–1935), founder of Guy Carpenter, a global risk and reinsurance specialist

=== H ===
- Harlean Carpenter, better known as Jean Harlow (1911–1937), American film actor
- Harriet Frances Carpenter (1868/75–1956), American educator and writer
- Harry Carpenter (disambiguation)
- Helen Knipe Carpenter (1881–1959), illustrator and writer
- Henry Carpenter (disambiguation)
- Herbert Carpenter (1869–1933), English cricketer
- Hermon P. Carpenter (1877–1958), early Florida educator
- Hick Carpenter (1855–1937), American Major League Baseball third baseman
- Holly Carpenter (born 1991), Miss Ireland 2011
- Horace B. Carpenter (1875–1945), American actor, director, and screenwriter
- Horace Thompson Carpenter (1857–1947), artist and illustrator
- Horace Carpenter (priest) (1887–1965), British priest
- Humphrey Carpenter (1946–2005), English biographer, author and radio broadcaster

=== I ===
- Imogen Carpenter (born Mary Imogene Carpenter; 1912–1993), American musician and actress
- Iris Carpenter (c. 1904–1997), British journalist
- Isaac Carpenter (disambiguation)

=== J ===
- J. D. Carpenter (born 1948), Canadian poet and crime novelist
- J. L. Carpenter (1839–1919), American politician
- J. R. Carpenter (born 1972), Canadian artist, writer, and performer
- Jack Carpenter (American football) (1923–2005), American football player
- Jake Burton Carpenter (1954–2019), owner of Burton Snowboards
- James Carpenter (disambiguation)
- Jay Hall Carpenter (born 1961), sculptor
- Jean Anne Carpenter, also known as Jean Carnahan (born 1933), American politician and writer
- Jeanne Carpenter (1917–1994), American child actor of the silent era
- Jeff Carpenter (fl. 2000s–2010s), Native American musician
- Jennifer Carpenter (fl. 1990s–2020s), American actor
- Joel Carpenter, pseudonym of Arnold Manoff (1914–1965), American screenwriter
- John Carpenter (disambiguation)
- Joseph Carpenter (disambiguation)
- Jot D. Carpenter (1938–2000), American landscape architect
- Joyce Carpenter (1923−2016), New Zealand diver
- Juliet Winters Carpenter (1948–2026), American translator of modern Japanese literature into English
- Julius Angelo Carpenter (1827–1880), American manufacturer and politician
- Justin Carpenter (fl. 2010s), video game developer who made Harms Way

=== K ===
- Karen Carpenter (1950–1983), singer and musician, half of The Carpenters
- Kathleen E. Carpenter (1891–1970), British freshwater ecologist
- Katie Carpenter (fl. 2010s–2020s), American actress, costume designer, and film producer
- Keion Carpenter (1977–2016), American football defensive back
- Keith Carpenter (born 1941), Canadian tennis player
- Ken Carpenter (disambiguation)
- Kent E. Carpenter (fl. 1970s–2010s), professor of biological sciences
- Kerry Carpenter (born 1997), American baseball player
- Kip Carpenter (born 1979), American speed skater
- Kyle Carpenter (born 1989), US Marine Corps soldier, Medal of Honor recipient

=== L ===
- Lant Carpenter (1780–1840), English educator and Unitarian minister
- Larry Carpenter (born 1948), American soap opera director
- Lauren Carpenter, New York violinist, sister of David Aaron Carpenter
- Lea Carpenter (fl. 2000s–2010s), American writer and editor
- Lemuel Carpenter (c. 1808–1859), Anglo-American California pioneer
- Leonard Carpenter (born 1948), technical writer and author of fantasy and science fiction
- Leonard Carpenter (rower) (1902–1994), American Olympic rower
- Lester Carpenter (born 1970), American politician
- Levi D. Carpenter (1802–1856), American politician
- Lew or Lewis Carpenter (disambiguation)
- Liz Carpenter (1920–2010), feminist writer, reporter, and public relations expert
- Loren Carpenter (1947–2025), American computer graphics researcher and developer
- Louis Carpenter (disambiguation)
- Louisa d'Andelot Carpenter (1907–1976), du Pont heiress, socialite, and aviator
- Lucy Carpenter (born 1969), British chemist
- Lyn Carpenter (born 1965), English netball administrator and former player

=== M ===
- Mackenzie Carpenter, American musician
- Maggie Carpenter (disambiguation)
- Malinda Carpenter (fl. 1990s–2020s), Fellow of the Royal Society of Edinburgh, child development psychology researcher
- Margaret Carpenter (born 1950), American politician
- Margaret Sarah Carpenter (1793–1872), British artist
- Margaret Seymour Carpenter (1893–1987), novelist
- Marion Carpenter (1920–2002), White House news photographer
- Marion Carpenter Yazdi (1902–1996), Bahá'í writer
- Marnee Carpenter (born 1990), American actress
- Mary Carpenter (1807–1877), English educational and social reformer
- Mary Chapin Carpenter (born 1958), country music singer-songwriter
- Mary P. Carpenter (c. 1840–c. 1905), American inventor
- Matt Carpenter (baseball) (born 1985), Major League Baseball third baseman
- Matt Carpenter (runner) (born 1964), American trail runner
- Matthew H. Carpenter (1824–1881), 19th century Republican Senator for Wisconsin
- Melanie Carpenter (1971–1995), abducted and murdered Canadian woman
- Melanie Carpenter (politician), American Democratic politician
- Meriva M. Carpenter (1802–1887), American artist
- Merlin Carpenter (born 1967), English artist
- Michael Carpenter (disambiguation)
- Moses Carpenter (1854–1889), Native American who died in England

=== N ===
- Nathanael Carpenter (1588/9?–1628), English author and geographer
- Nathaniel L. Carpenter (1805–1892), entrepreneur and businessman of antebellum Natchez, Mississippi
- Neil Carpenter (born 1944), Canadian pair skater
- Nicholas Carpenter (fl. 2000s–2010s), film director, son of Scott Carpenter
- Novella Carpenter (fl. 2000s–2010s), writer and gardener

=== P ===
- Patricia Carpenter (music theorist) (1923–2000), American professor of music theory
- Patricia Carpenter (psychologist) (fl. 1990s–2000s), professor of psychology
- Paul Carpenter (actor) (1921–1964), Canadian actor and singer
- Paul Carpenter (baseball), minor league baseball player
- Paul B. Carpenter (1928–2002), Californian politician
- Percy Carpenter (1820–1895), British artist
- Pete Carpenter (1914–1987), American jazz trombonist, musical arranger, and television theme song scorer
- Peter Carpenter (1891–1971), Welsh pilot
- Peter F. Carpenter (born 1940), American philanthropist
- Philip Herbert Carpenter (1852–1891), British naturalist
- Philip Pearsall Carpenter (1819–1877), malacologist
- Philip Carpenter (1776–1833), founder of scientific instrument maker Carpenter and Westley
- Philo Carpenter (1805–1886), Chicago's first pharmacist and abolitionist
- Preston Carpenter (1934–2011), American football player

=== R ===
- R. R. M. Carpenter (1877–1949), American business executive
- R. R. M. Carpenter Jr. (1915–1990), owner and club president of the Philadelphia Phillies
- Ralph Carpenter (1909–2009), expert on Colonial American design
- Ramsey Carpenter-Bearse (born 1990), Miss Kentucky 2014, competitor for the title of Miss America 2015
- Randolph Carpenter (1894–1956), U.S. Representative from Kansas
- Rene Carpenter (1928–2020), American newspaper columnist and television host
- Rhys Carpenter (1889–1980), classical art historian and professor at Bryn Mawr College
- Richard Carpenter (disambiguation)
- Rita Jenrette (born 1949), née Carpenter, American celebrity, actor, television journalist, and real estate executive
- Rob or Robert Carpenter (disambiguation)
- Rolla C. Carpenter (1852–1919), American engineer
- Rollo Carpenter (born 1965), creator of Jabberwacky AI software
- Ron Carpenter (defensive back) (born 1970), American football player
- Ron Carpenter (defensive lineman) (born 1948), American football player
- Ron Carpenter (designer) (born 1950), British type designer
- Ruly Carpenter (1940–2021), principal owner and president of the Philadelphia Phillies Major League Baseball team
- Russell Carpenter (born 1950), American cinematographer
- Ryan Carpenter (born 1991), American ice hockey center
- Ryan Carpenter (baseball) (born 1990), American baseball pitcher

=== S ===
- Sabrina Carpenter (born 1999), American singer, songwriter and actress
- Samuel or Sam Carpenter (disambiguation)
- Sarah Carpenter, British academic
- Scott Carpenter (disambiguation)
- Sean Carpenter, New York violinist, brother of David Aaron Carpenter
- Shawn Carpenter (fl. 2000s), American Navy veteran
- Shelt Carpenter (1862–1937), West Virginia outdoorsman and fiddle player
- Simon Carpenter (fl. 2000s–2010s), British entomologist
- Stanley Jennings Carpenter (1904–1984), US Army colonel and medical entomologist
- Stephen Carpenter (disambiguation)
- Steve Carpenter (born 1971), Canadian ice hockey defenceman
- Steve Carpenter (American football) (born 1958), American football defensive back
- Sue Carpenter (born 1956), former UK TV presenter
- Susan Carpenter (fl. 1990s–2010s), American writer and pirate radio personality

=== T ===
- Tariq Carpenter (born 1998), American football player
- Ted Carpenter (disambiguation)
- Teresa Carpenter (born 1948), American author
- Terry Carpenter (1900–1978), American politician
- Thelma Carpenter (1922–1997), jazz singer and actress
- Thelma Carpenter (billiards player) (1911–1986), English billiards and snooker player
- Theodore Carpenter (1898–1975), jazz musician
- Thomas Carpenter (disambiguation)
- Tim Carpenter (born 1960), American politician

=== V ===
- Vivian Carpenter (born 1952), accounting academic and business executive

=== W ===
- Walker Carpenter (1893–1956), American college football player
- Walter Carpenter (1834–1904), Royal Navy officer
- Walter Randolph Carpenter (1877–1954), Australian-Canadian entrepreneur, businessman and philanthropist
- Walter S. Carpenter Jr. (1888–1976), American corporate executive
- Warren L. Carpenter (1931–2003), US Air Force flight surgeon
- Wendi B. Carpenter (born 1956), US Navy rear admiral
- Whitney Carpenter, American journalist
- William Carpenter (disambiguation)
- Willie C. Carpenter (fl. 1970s–present), American actor

== Fictional characters ==
=== No first name ===
- Dr. Carpenter, British spy in Ice Station Zebra (novel)
- "Mr. Carpenter", alias of Klaatu in the film The Day the Earth Stood Still
- The Carpenter family, a protagonist family line in the 1987 novel Sarum
- The Carpenter Clan, a group of women in the 1996 novel Shadow Ranch by Jo-Ann Mapson

=== Other ===
- Andy Carpenter, the lead character in a series of mystery books by David Rosenfelt (author)
- Atticus Carpenter, the overriding antagonist in Insurrection (StarCraft)
- Bop Carpenter, patriarch of the Carpenter family clan in Jo-Ann Mapson's novel Shadow Ranch
- Cassie Carpenter, in the soap opera EastEnders
- Derek Carpenter, in the 2010 television film Mothman
- Lieutenant Elroy Carpenter, on the television show McHale's Navy
- Dr. Guy Carpenter, physicist protagonist of A Hole in Texas
- Guy Carpenter (Neighbours), in the soap opera Neighbours
- Hannah Carpenter, in EastEnders
- Henry Carpenter, the title character of the film The Book of Henry
- Jack Carpenter, main character in a series of books by James Swain
- Jake Carpenter, main character from Pirate Diary: The Journal of Jake Carpenter by Richard Platt
- Joe Carpenter, protagonist of the novel Sole Survivor
- Dr. John Carpenter, the main character played by Elvis Presley in the 1969 musical drama film Change of Habit
- Joseph Carpenter, codenamed "Joker", supporting character from the Read or Die series of novels, manga, and anime
- Julia Carpenter, the second Spider-Woman and Madame Web in Marvel Comics
- Kelvin Carpenter, from EastEnders
- Lauren Carpenter, in the Australian soap opera Neighbours
- Lou Carpenter, from Neighbours
- Louise Carpenter, in Neighbours
- Meg Carpenter, a genre fiction ghostwriter, book reviewer, and writing coach in the 2010 novel Our Tragic Universe by Scarlett Thomas
- Michael Carpenter, a major side character in The Dresden Files book series by Jim Butcher
- Nora Carpenter, in the American horror movie Final Destination 2
- O Be Joyful Carpenter, a Puritan in the 1997 novel London
- Patsy Carpenter, the main character of the 1970 novel Moving On by Larry McMurtry
- Patsy Carpenter, in Terms of Endearment
- Sabina Carpenter, widow of a Pinkerton detective in Bill Pronzini's 1890s Western detective short story collection Carpenter and Quincannon, Professional Detective Services
- Tony Carpenter, in EastEnders
- Zoe Carpenter, in the soap opera Hollyoaks

== See also ==
- Admiral Carpenter (disambiguation)
- General Carpenter (disambiguation)
- Governor Carpenter (disambiguation)
- Justice Carpenter (disambiguation)
- Senator Carpenter (disambiguation)
- Carpenter (disambiguation)
