= John Carpenter (disambiguation) =

John Carpenter (born 1948) is an American film director, screenwriter, producer, actor, and film music composer.

John Carpenter may also refer to:

- John A. Carpenter (1912–1978), American historian
- John Alden Carpenter (1876–1951), American composer
- John Barker Carpenter (1930–2017), American basketball coach
- John C. Carpenter (politician) (1930–2016), American businessman, rancher, and politician
- John Henry Carpenter (1928–1998), accused of the 1978 murder of actor Bob Crane
- John Jo Carpenter, pseudonym of John H. Reese (1910–1981), American author of Western and crime fiction
- John M. Carpenter (1935–2020), American nuclear engineer
- John Stilley Carpenter (1849–1925), pioneer settler of Utah
- John W. Carpenter (1881–1959), Texas businessman and agriculturist
- John Wilson Carpenter III (1916–1996), U.S. Air Force general
- John Carpenter, 4th Earl of Tyrconnell (1790–1853), British peer
- John Carpenter (archbishop of Dublin) (died 1786), Roman Catholic archbishop of Dublin
- John Carpenter (athlete) (1884–1933), American athlete who competed in the 1908 Summer Olympics
- John Carpenter (bishop of Worcester) (1399–1476), bishop of Worcester
- John Carpenter (footballer) (born 1948), Australian rules footballer for Essendon
- John Carpenter (game show contestant) (born 1967), first $1 million winner on the game show Who Wants to Be a Millionaire
- John Carpenter (referee) (1936–2021), Irish football referee
- John Carpenter (town clerk) (died 1442), founder of the City of London School
- John Carpenter (British Army officer) (1894−1967)
- John Boyd-Carpenter, Baron Boyd-Carpenter (1908–1998), British politician

== See also ==
- Johnny Carpenter (1914–2003), American film actor, screenwriter and producer
- John W. Carpenter Freeway, Irving, Texas, USA
- John Carpenter Garnier (born Carpenter) (1839–1926), English Conservative politician who sat in the House of Commons from 1873 to 1884
- Jack Carpenter (disambiguation)

== See more ==
- List of people with surname Carpenter, for real and fictional Carpenters
- Carpenter (disambiguation), for Carpenter named communities, natural features, and man-made features
- Historic Carpenter Houses, for houses, homes, shops, homesteads, farmsteads, or other partially named or hyphenated named places with "Carpenter" or a similar meaning name
