= Robert R. M. Carpenter =

Robert R. M. Carpenter may refer to:

- R. R. M. Carpenter (1877–1949), American executive and member of the board of directors of DuPont
- R. R. M. Carpenter Jr. (1915–1990), his son, owner of the Philadelphia Phillies
- Ruly Carpenter, son of Robert Jr. and grandson of Robert Sr., owner and team president of the Phillies

== See also ==
- Robert Carpenter (disambiguation)
- Bobby Carpenter (disambiguation)
