= Sam Carpenter =

Sam, Samuel or Samantha Carpenter may refer to:

- Samuel Carpenter (deputy governor) (1649–1714), treasurer and deputy governor of Pennsylvania
- Samuel Leas Carpenter (1795–1876), member of the Pennsylvania Senate
- Sam Carpenter (footballer), (born 1987), Australian rules footballer
- Sam Carpenter (Scream), a fictional character from the 2022 film Scream
- Samuel Carpenter, mayor of Lancaster, Pennsylvania

== See also ==
- List of people with surname Carpenter
