= Patricia Carpenter =

Patricia Carpenter may refer to:

- Patricia Carpenter (psychologist)
- Patricia Carpenter (music theorist)
