= Mary Carpenter (disambiguation) =

Mary Carpenter (1807–1877) was an English educational and social reformer.

Mary Carpenter may also refer to:

- Mary Chapin Carpenter (born 1958), American singer, songwriter, and musician
- Mary Elizabeth Sutherland Carpenter, better known as Liz Carpenter (1920–2010), American writer, feminist, reporter, media advisor, speechwriter, political humorist, and public relations expert
- Mary Imogen Carpenter (1912–1993), American actress, musician, composer, and music lecturer
- Mary P. Carpenter (c. 1840–c. 1905), American inventor
