= Judge Carpenter =

Judge Carpenter may refer to:

- Arthur P. Carpenter (1867–1937), judge of the Brattleboro, Vermont municipal court
- George Albert Carpenter (1867–1944), judge of the United States District Court for the Northern District of Illinois
- George Moulton Carpenter Jr. (1844–1896), judge of the United States District Court for the District of Rhode Island
- Louis Carpenter (judge) (1829–1863), Douglas County, Kansas state court judge

== See also ==
- Justice Carpenter (disambiguation)
