= Admiral Carpenter =

Admiral Carpenter may refer to:

- Albert J. Carpenter (1911–1999), U.S. Coast Guard rear admiral
- Alfred Carpenter (1881–1955), British Royal Navy vice admiral
- Charles C. Carpenter (admiral) (1834–1899), U.S. Navy rear admiral
- Charles L. Carpenter (1902–1992), U.S. Navy rear admiral
- Walter Carpenter (1834–1904), British Royal Navy admiral
- Wendi B. Carpenter (born 1956), U.S. Navy rear admiral

== See also ==
- Arthur S. Carpender (1884–1960), U.S. Navy admiral
