= James Carpenter =

James Carpenter may refer to:

- James Carpenter (actor) (fl. 1980s–2010s), Shakespearean actor in the San Francisco Bay Area
- James Carpenter (architect) (born 1949), American light artist and designer
- James Carpenter (astronomer) (1840–1899), British astronomer
- James Carpenter (offensive lineman) (born 1989), American football offensive lineman
- James Carpenter (cricketer) (born 1975), former English cricketer
- James Carpenter (defensive tackle) (born 2001), American football player
- James Carpenter (fencer) (born 1962), American fencer
- James Carpenter (Royal Navy officer) (1760–1845), British navy officer
- James C. Carpenter, American engineer; covered-bridge builder
- James Edward Carpenter (1841–1901), United States Army officer
- James Edwin Ruthven Carpenter Jr. (1867–1932), American architect
- James Henry Carpenter (1846–1898), American engineer and industrialist
- James Madison Carpenter (1888–1983), American Methodist minister and musicologist
- James R. Carpenter (1867–1943), member of the Wyoming Senate
- Jimmy Carpenter, American electric blues saxophonist, singer, songwriter, arranger and record producer
