= Thomas Carpenter =

Thomas Carpenter may refer to:

- Thomas G. Carpenter (1926–2021), American educator
- Thomas Carpenter (glassmaker) (1752–1847), American soldier and glassmaker
- Thomas Carpenter III (1733–1807), American soldier
- Thomas Preston Carpenter (1804–1876), American lawyer and judge
- Thomas Carpenter (MP) (died 1565), English MP who represented Chichester

== See also ==
- List of people with surname Carpenter
