= Ken Carpenter =

Ken Carpenter may refer to:

- Ken Carpenter (gridiron football) (1926–2011), American and Canadian football player, 1950–1960
- Ken Carpenter (announcer) (1900–1984), NBC radio announcer
- Ken Carpenter (discus thrower) (1913–1984), 1936 Summer Olympics gold medalist in the discus throw
- Ken Carpenter (cyclist) (born 1965), American track cyclist
- Ken Carpenter (journalist) (born 1956), American journalist and journalism professor
- Kenneth Carpenter (born 1949), American paleontologist
