= John W. Carpenter Freeway =

John W. Carpenter Freeway is a continuous named route consisting of connected segments of the following numbered highways:

- Texas State Highway 114, a portion named after John W. Carpenter in Irving, Texas.
- Texas State Highway 183, a portion named after John W. Carpenter in Irving, Texas.

== See also ==
- John W. Carpenter
