= George Carpenter =

George Carpenter may refer to:

- George Albert Carpenter (1867–1944), U.S. federal judge, Northern District of Illinois
- George Alfred Carpenter (1859–1910), English physician
- George Herbert Carpenter (1865–1939), British naturalist and entomologist
- George Moulton Carpenter Jr. (1844–1896), U.S. federal judge, District of Rhode Island
- George O. Carpenter (1827–1896), American businessman and politician
- George Rice Carpenter (1863–1909), educator, scholar and author
- George Washington Carpenter (1802–1860), American scientist
- George Carpenter, 1st Baron Carpenter (1657–1731), British soldier, MP and ambassador
- George Carpenter, 2nd Baron Carpenter (1702–1749), British politician
- George Carpenter, 1st Earl of Tyrconnell (1723–1762), 3rd Baron Carpenter, British politician
- George Carpenter, 2nd Earl of Tyrconnell (1750–1805), British nobleman and Member of Parliament
- George Carpenter, 3rd Earl of Tyrconnell (1788–1812), British peer and soldier
- George Carpenter (fencer) (1908–2005), Irish Olympic fencer
- George Carpenter (footballer) (1881–1919), Australian rules footballer
- George Carpenter (Salvation Army) (1872–1948), 5th General of The Salvation Army
- George Carpenter (pilot) (1917–2005), American pilot
- George Carpenter (cricketer) (1818–1849), English cricketer
