= Margaret Carpenter (disambiguation) =

Margaret Carpenter was a politician.

Margaret Carpenter may also refer to:

- Margaret Sarah Carpenter, painter
- Margaret Seymour Carpenter, writer

== See also ==
- Maggie Carpenter (disambiguation)
