= Belvale =

Historic house in Fairfax County, Virginia

Coordinates: 38°45′49″N 77°07′38″W

Belvale is an historic house in present-day Fairfax County, Virginia built between 1763 and 1766 by George Johnston (1700–1766), member of the Virginia Assembly 1758–1766, friend of Patrick Henry, and legal advisor to George Washington, who was a frequent visitor to the home. The home's original lands, described as lying on "Doeg's Run", were first granted on July 6, 1698 to Richard Carpenter, who bequeathed them in 1750 to his wife Mary and daughter Ann, who sold the property to Johnston in 1763. Belvale is sometimes called "Belle Vale Manor" in historical records. Belvale was Johnston's country seat; his town home was in the city of Alexandria.

The grounds of Belvale are reputed to harbor a ghost of a young man killed in a duel who was buried under a cedar tree, reputedly with Washington's assistance in digging the grave and planting the cedar tree. The Historic American Buildings Survey documentation of the house, which is a private residence, states that a cemetery which may have been a slave burial ground is on the property, though it is no longer extant.
