= Edward Carpenter (disambiguation) =

Edward Carpenter (1844–1929) was an English socialist and poet.

Edward Carpenter may also refer to:

- Edward Carpenter (priest) (1910–1998), English Anglican priest, Dean of Westminster
- Edward Childs Carpenter (1872–1950), American novelist, dramatist and stage director

== See also ==
- Ed Carpenter (disambiguation)
- Ted Carpenter (disambiguation)
- Edmund Carpenter (disambiguation)
