= Senator Carpentier =

Senator Carpentier may refer to:

- Charles F. Carpentier (1896–1964), Illinois State Senate
- Donald D. Carpentier (1931–1982), Illinois State Senate

== See also ==
- Senator Carpenter (disambiguation)
