= Jack Carpenter =

Jack Carpenter is the name of:

- Jack Carpenter (gridiron football) (1923–2005), American football player
- John M. Carpenter (1935–2020), a.k.a. Jack Carpenter, American nuclear engineer

== See also ==
- John Carpenter (disambiguation)
