= Franklin Carpenter =

Franklin Carpenter may refer to:

- Franklin B. Carpenter (1818–1862), American lumber merchant and politician
- Franklin Metcalfe Carpenter (1847–1907), farmer and political figure in Ontario, Canada
- Franklin R. Carpenter (1848–1910), mining specialist

== See also ==
- Frank Carpenter (disambiguation)
