= Richard Carpenter (disambiguation) =

Richard Carpenter (born 1946) is an American musician, known as one half of sibling musical duo, the Carpenters.

Richard Carpenter may also refer to:

- Richard Carpenter (theologian) (1575–1627), English clergyman and theological writer
- Richard Carpenter (ca. 1700–1750), original owner of the Belvale property in Virginia
- Richard Cromwell Carpenter (1812–1855), British 19th-century architect
- Richard Carpenter (architect) (1841–1893), British Victorian architect
- Richard Carpenter (screenwriter) (1929–2012), British screenwriter and actor
- Richard Carpenter, composer of Miles Davis' "Walkin'"
- Richard Carpenter (footballer) (born 1972), English football player
