= Stephen Carpenter (disambiguation) =

Stephen Carpenter (born 1970) is an American musician. Stephen Carpenter may also refer to:

- Stephen Carpenter (writer) (fl. 1980s–2010s), American writer, film director, and cinematographer
- Stephen Cullen Carpenter (1752–1830), British-American journalist
- Stephen Decatur Carpenter (1818–1862), U.S. Army officer
- Stephen R. Carpenter (born 1952), American lake ecologist

== See also ==
- Steve Carpenter (born 1971), Canadian ice hockey defenceman
- Steve Carpenter (American football) (born 1958), American football defensive back
