= Frank Carpenter =

Frank Carpenter may refer to:

- Frank G. Carpenter (1855–1924), American author and photographer
- Frank M. Carpenter (1902–1994), American entomologist and paleontologist

== See also ==
- Francis Carpenter (disambiguation)
- Franklin Carpenter (disambiguation)
- Frank Pierce Carpenter House, Manchester, New Hampshire
