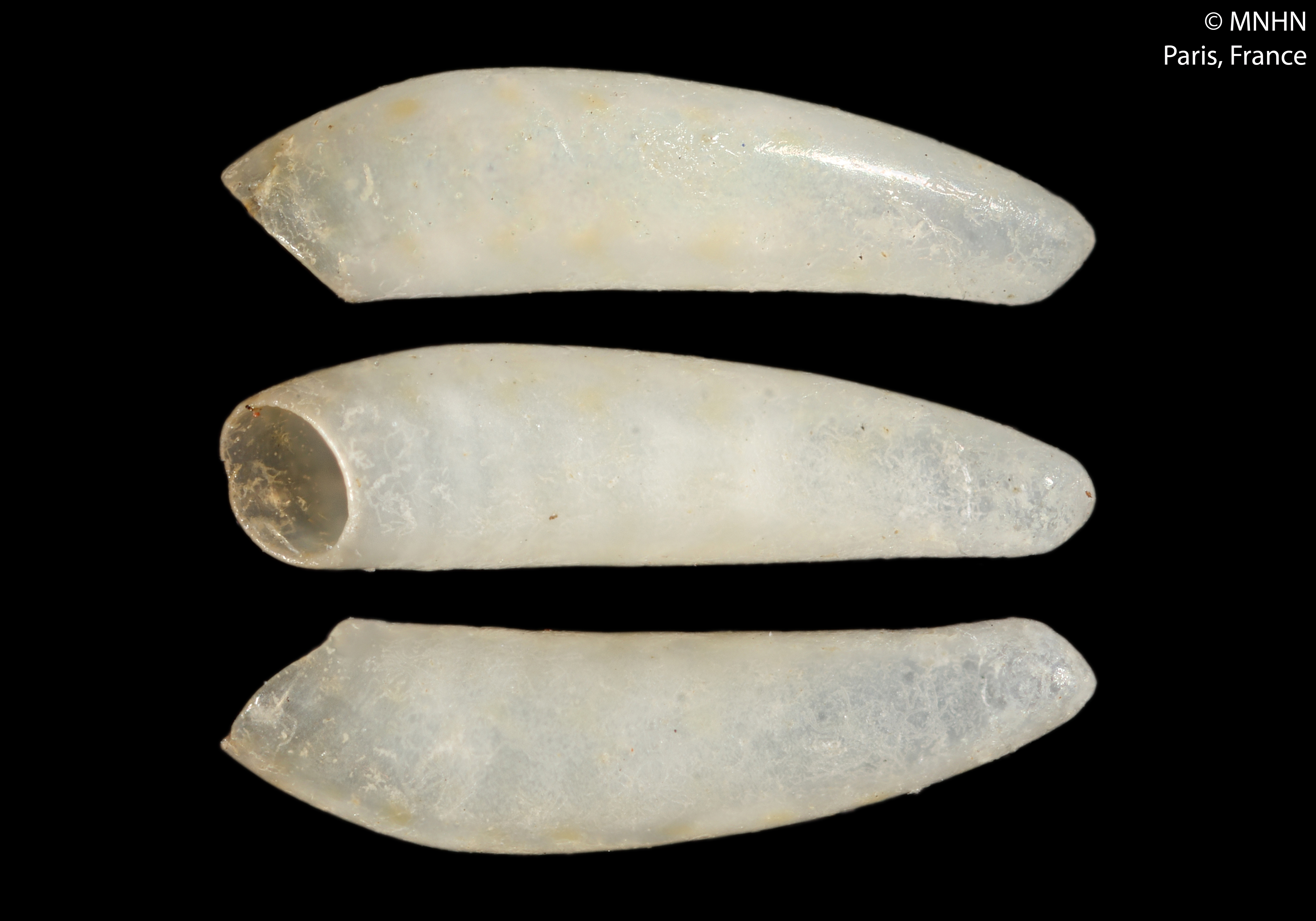
- Lectotype of Meioceras nitidum at MNHN, Paris

Scientific classification
- Kingdom: Animalia
- Phylum: Mollusca
- Class: Gastropoda
- Subclass: Caenogastropoda
- Order: Littorinimorpha
- Superfamily: Truncatelloidea
- Family: Caecidae
- Genus: Meioceras; Carpenter, 1859

Type species
- Meioceras cornucopiae Carpenter, 1859

Synonyms
- Caecum (Meioceras) Carpenter, 1859

= Meioceras =

Genus of gastropods

Meioceras is a genus of minute sea snails, marine gastropod mollusks or micromollusks in the family Caecidae.

== Species ==
Species within the genus Meioceras include:

- Meioceras cornucopiae Carpenter, 1858
- Meioceras cubitatum Folin, 1868
- † Meioceras mateldae Selli, 1974
- Meioceras nitidum (Stimpson, 1851)
- Meioceras tumidissimum de Folin, 1869

Species brought into synonymy

- Meioceras bermudezi Pilsbry & Aguayo, 1934: synonym of Meioceras cornucopiae Carpenter, 1859
- Meioceras bitumidum de Folin, 1869: synonym of Meioceras nitidum (Stimpson, 1851)
- Meioceras boucheti Pizzini & Raines, 2011: synonym of Mauroceras boucheti (Pizzini & Raines, 2011) (original combination)
- Meioceras carpenteri de Folin, 1869: synonym of Meioceras nitidum (Stimpson, 1851)
- Meioceras cingulatum Dall, 1892: synonym of Meioceras nitidum (Stimpson, 1851)
- Meioceras constrictum Pilsbry & Aguayo, 1933: synonym of Meioceras cornucopiae Carpenter, 1859
- Meioceras contractum de Folin, 1874: synonym of Meioceras nitidum (Stimpson, 1851)
- Meioceras cornubovis Carpenter, 1859: synonym of Meioceras cornucopiae Carpenter, 1859
- Meioceras coxi de Folin, 1869: synonym of Meioceras nitidum (Stimpson, 1851)
- Meioceras crossei de Folin, 1869: synonym of Meioceras nitidum (Stimpson, 1851)
- Meioceras deshayesi de Folin, 1869: synonym of Meioceras nitidum (Stimpson, 1851)
- Meioceras fischeri de Folin, 1870: synonym of Meioceras nitidum (Stimpson, 1851)
- Meioceras imiklis de Folin, 1870: synonym of Meioceras nitidum (Stimpson, 1851)
- Meioceras kajiyamai Habe, 1963: synonym of Mauroceras kajiyamai (Habe, 1963) (original combination)
- Meioceras legumen (Hedley, 1899): synonym of Mauroceras legumen (Hedley, 1899)
- Meioceras leoni Bérillon, 1874: synonym of Meioceras nitidum (Stimpson, 1851)
- Meioceras mariae de Folin, 1881: synonym of Meioceras cornucopiae Carpenter, 1859
- Meioceras moreleti de Folin, 1869: synonym of Meioceras nitidum (Stimpson, 1851)
- Meioceras rhinoceros Pizzini, Raines & Vannozzi, 2013: synonym of Mauroceras rhinoceros (Pizzini, Raines & Vannozzi, 2013) (original combination)
- Meioceras sandwichense de Folin, 1881: synonym of Mauroceras sandwichense (de Folin, 1881) (original combination)
- Meioceras subinflexum de Folin, 1869: synonym of Meioceras nitidum (Stimpson, 1851)
- Meioceras tenerum de Folin, 1869: synonym of Meioceras cubitatum de Folin, 1868
- Meioceras undulosum de Folin, 1869: synonym of Meioceras nitidum (Stimpson, 1851)
