= Ted Carpenter =

Ted or Theodore Carpenter may refer to:

- Theodore Carpenter (1898–1975), American jazz musician
- Edmund Snow Carpenter (1922–2011), American anthropologist
- Ted Carpenter (politician) (1951–2020), American politician from Arizona
- Theodore Carpenter House, a house in Mount Kisco, Westchester County, New York

== See also ==
- Ed Carpenter (disambiguation)
- Edmund Carpenter (disambiguation)
- Edward Carpenter (disambiguation)
