= Meioceras cubitatum =

Scientific classification
- Kingdom: Animalia
- Phylum: Mollusca
- Class: Gastropoda
- Subclass: Caenogastropoda
- Order: Littorinimorpha
- Family: Caecidae
- Genus: Meioceras
- Species: M. cubitatum

Binomial name
- Meioceras cubitatum Folin, 1868

Species of gastropod

Meioceras cubitatum is a species of small sea snail, a marine gastropod mollusk or micromollusk in the family Caecidae.

== Description ==
The maximum recorded shell length is 2 mm.

== Habitat ==
Minimum recorded depth is 0 m. Maximum recorded depth is 183 m.
