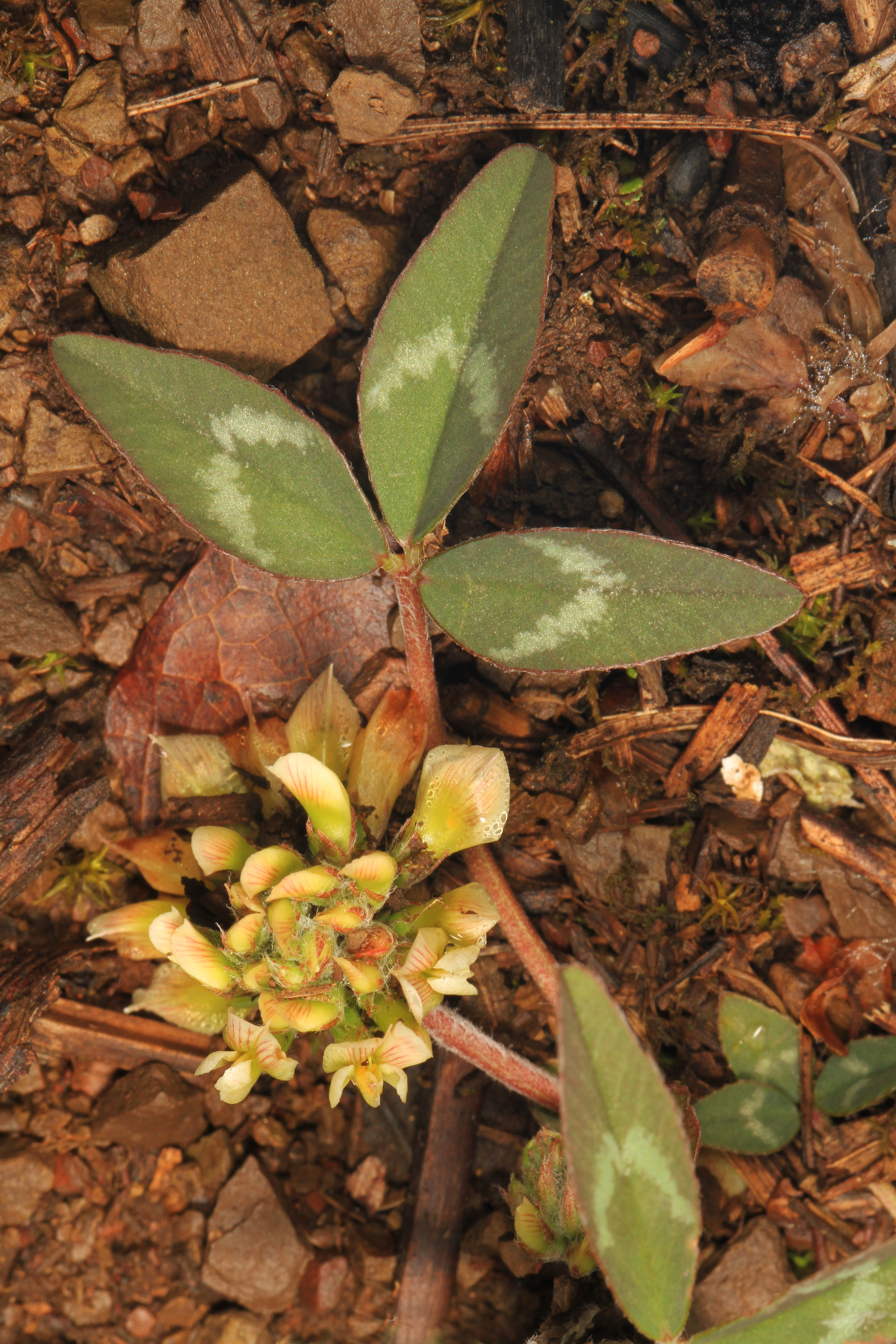

Conservation status
- Vulnerable (NatureServe)

Scientific classification
- Kingdom: Plantae
- Clade: Embryophytes
- Clade: Tracheophytes
- Clade: Spermatophytes
- Clade: Angiosperms
- Clade: Eudicots
- Clade: Rosids
- Order: Fabales
- Family: Fabaceae
- Subfamily: Faboideae
- Genus: Trifolium
- Species: T. virginicum

Binomial name
- Trifolium virginicum Small

Synonyms
- Trifolium reflexum var. virginicum (Small) McDermott

= Trifolium virginicum =

Species of flowering plant

Trifolium virginicum, the Kate's Mountain clover, is a species of flowering plant in the family Fabaceae. It is native to West Virginia and Virginia in the United States, growing mainly on the Piedmont mafic barren, with Kate's Mountain as the type locality. Trifolium virginicum is a symbol of the West Virginia Native Plant Society. T. virginicum can also be found in Maryland and Pennsylvania, where it is considered imperiled or critically imperiled, respectively, by NatureServe.
