= Louis Carpenter =

Louis Carpenter may refer to:

- Louis H. Carpenter (1839–1916), American military general
- Louis Carpenter (judge) (1829–1863), American jurist
- Louis George Carpenter (1861–1935), college professor and engineer
- Lou Carpenter, Neighbours character

== See also ==
- Lewis Carpenter (disambiguation)
