= Kate's Mountain =

Mountain in Greenbrier County, West Virginia, United States

Coordinates: 37.7638°N 80.3016°W

Kate's Mountain, south of White Sulphur Springs in Greenbrier County, West Virginia, was named for Catherine "Kate" Carpenter, who in September 1756 took refuge with her child on the mountain's peak during an Indian attack in which her husband Nicholas Carpenter was killed near Fort Dinwiddie (also known as Byrd's Fort and Warwick's Fort) in the vicinity of White Sulphur Springs, West Virginia. Kate's Mountain is the highest of the peaks in Greenbrier State Forest at 3,280 feet. Kate's Mountain was the inspiration for the 19th Century romantic poem The Mystic Circle of Kate's Mountain, first published in fragmentary form in 1860 and published in its entirety in 1895. Kate's Mountain is the type location for Kate's Mountain clover, Trifolium virginicum, the symbol of the West Virginia Native Plant Society.
