= Ken Carpenter (journalist) =

American journalist

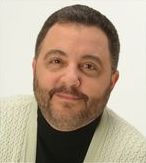
- Born: Kenneth Stephen Carpenter; November 18, 1956 (age 69); Cleveland, Ohio
- Education: Cleveland State University, B.A., M.S. Webster University, M.B.A.
- Occupations: Adjunct Professor of English; Rollins College; Winter Park, Fla.
- Known for: Golfweek.com (founding editor); The Golf Gazette (founding editor/publisher); Journalism Buzz (founding editor); Global Peace Film Festival (chairman of the board)
- Spouse(s): Debbie Carpenter (née DiLullo), 1988
- Parent(s): Carmela Carpenter (née Bornino); Warren J. Carpenter
- Website: KenCarpenter.com

Ken Carpenter (born November 18, 1956, in Cleveland, Ohio), is an American journalist and journalism professor. He was an editor and reporter at The Plain Dealer in Cleveland (1980–87); a senior editor at The National Sports Daily in New York (1989–91); managing editor at Golfweek magazine in Winter Haven and Orlando, Fla. (1992–98); founding editor of Golfweek.com in Orlando, Fla. (1998–2001); copy editor at the Tampa Tribune (2001–02) and Orlando Sentinel (2002–03); and founding editor and publisher of TheGolfGazette.com.

In 2009 Carpenter established Journalism Buzz, a public service that aggregates news about journalism and new media on the Twitter platform.

In 2014 Carpenter was voted chairman of the board of directors for the Global Peace Film Festival.

Carpenter is the associate producer of the award-winning documentary film "China: The Rebirth of an Empire," which was named Best Documentary at the 2011 River Bend Film Festival, the 2010 Central Florida Film Festival, the 2010 Astoria/Long Island City Film Festival, and the 2010 Big Easy International Film Festival.

Carpenter is the associate producer of a new documentary film "Passfire," now in production with a planned release in 2016.

He is an adjunct professor of English in the Hamilton Holt School at Rollins College in Winter Park, Fla. He is a former professor of journalism, mass communications and film at Valencia College in Orlando, Fla. (2002–2014).

== See also ==
- KenCarpenter.com
- Journalism Buzz
- The Golf Gazette
- Global Peace Film Festival
- China: The Rebirth of an Empire
- Passfire
