= Horace Thompson Carpenter =

American artist

- Born: 10 October 1857; Monroe, Michigan
- Died: 20 May 1947 (aged 89); Bala (now Bala Cynwyd), Montgomery County, Pennsylvania
- Citizenship: U.S.A.
- Education: Pennsylvania Academy of Fine Arts; Philadelphia School of Industrial Art; New York Art Students League
- Occupations: Illustrator, artist, and art writer; curator of Independence Hall
- Spouse: Mary Cowgill Conwell
- Parent(s): Rev. Samuel Tonkin Carpenter and his 2nd wife Emilie D. Thompson

Horace Thompson Carpenter (1857 in Monroe, Michigan – 1947 in Bala (now part of Bala Cynwyd), Montgomery County, Pennsylvania), was an illustrator, artist and art writer of the late 19th and early 20th century United States.

== Education ==
Carpenter was educated at the Episcopal Academy of Philadelphia, the Pennsylvania Academy of Fine Arts (studying under Thomas Eakins), the Philadelphia School of Industrial Art and the New York Art Students League.

== Personal ==
Carpenter was a descendant of Samuel Carpenter, a close associate of William Penn, the founder of Pennsylvania. He married on September 28, 1886, in Wilmington, Delaware, to Mary Cowgill Conwell, who was born June 10, 1863, in Delaware and died February 12, 1929. The couple had one son, Samuel Naudain Carpenter (1890–1967).

== Works ==
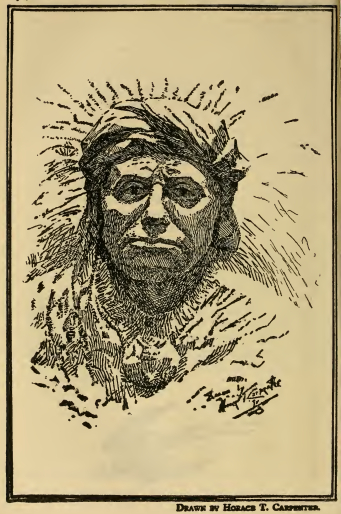
Illustration from The Chap-Book by Horace Thompson Carpenter, 1897

At the time of his marriage, Carpenter was the secretary of a corporation in Chicago. In December 1892, he was appointed manager of The Literary Northwest magazine published in St. Paul, Minnesota from 1892-1893. In 1920, his primary occupation as annotated in the census was "artist."

His work as an artist was primarily in illustration and oil painting. Among his earliest attributed works are illustrations of books published in the early 1890s and magazines such as Cosmopolitan and the 1897 issue of The Chap-Book. He illustrated several books of note, including Hamlin Garland's Main-Travelled Roads, Being Six Stories of the Mississippi Valley (Chicago: Stone & Kimball, 1893) and Prairie Songs, Being Chants Rhymed and Unrhymed of the Level Lands of the Great West (Chicago: Stone & Kimball, 1893); an 1894 edition of George Eliot's The Mill on the Floss; Mary Harriott Norris' The Grapes of Wrath: a Tale of North and South (Boston: Small, Maynard & Company, 1901); Francis Marion Crawford's Whosoever Shall Offend (New York: The Macmillan Company, 1904) and Fair Margaret: A Portrait (New York: The Macmillan Company, 1905); William Johnston's and Paul West's The Innocent Murderers (New York: Duffield & Company, 1910); Alice Brown's Robin Hood's Barn (New York: The Macmillan Company, 1913); and John Jakob Raskob's The Raskob-Green Record Book (Claymont, Del.: privately published, 1921).

In 1904, he was a guest of American novelist Francis Marion Crawford in Rome, where he became acquainted with Italian sculptor Gaetano Chiaromonte and American artist Elihu Vedder among others, and filled several sketchbooks with drawings of local scenes. As an independent artist in Philadelphia, he painted derivative works of notable officials of Dickinson College in Carlisle, Pennsylvania, and historical paintings for private clients and patrons in New York and Delaware. The Society of Independent Artists lists four of his paintings exhibited at Independence Hall, A Summer Shower and The Bird Bath in 1917, and Horta, the Azores and Building Castles in 1919.

The Library of Congress Copyright Office in 1919 lists a painting by Carpenter portraying Caesar Rodney meeting Delegate Thomas McKean on the steps of the State House in Philadelphia on July 4, 1776 with Benjamin Franklin, Thomas Jefferson and George Read standing inside the door.

From 1899 to 1912, he was a member of The Players Club in New York City, founded in 1888 by Shakespearean actor Edwin Booth, brother of John Wilkes Booth, a gathering place for actors and eminent men in other professions. He served as superintendent and then curator of Independence Hall (now Independence National Historical Park) in Philadelphia from 1916 to 1946.
