= Stephen Cullen Carpenter =

Irish-born author, reporter, editor and journal founder

- Born: 1752; Ireland
- Died: 24 July 1830 (aged 77–78); Philadelphia, Pennsylvania, U.S.
- Other name: Donald Campbell (pen name)
- Citizenship: American
- Occupations: Author, reporter, editor and newspaper and magazine founder
- Years active: about 1775 – about 1825

Stephen Cullen Carpenter (1752 – 24 July 1830) was an author, reporter, editor and founder or co-founder of the Charleston Courier. He was characterized, as "a pro-English Irishman who fled to the colonies in 1802 compelled by a miscarriage," apparently referring to the loss of a military chest while he was deputy paymaster for the British Army in India.

== Life ==
Born in 1752, in Ireland, Carpenter first worked in the journalism business in London as a reporter of Parliamentary proceedings. He also published two books in London, in 1795 and 1798, under the pen name Donald Campbell. In 1802 or 1803, he emigrated to the United States and settled in Charleston, South Carolina, where he was one of the founders of the Charleston Courier, a Federalist newspaper for which he became the first editor, serving until 1806.

Carpenter was the first important drama critic of the theater in Charleston, at a time when Charleston was a theatrical center of the young nation. In 1805 he established and published the Monthly Register, Magazine, and Review of the United States, the publication of which he took with him to New York in 1806.

After about three years in Charleston, Carpenter changed politics and newspapers when he moved to New York to be editor from 1806 to 1807 of the People's Friend.

Carpenter married Ann Osborne on 26 December 1808 in Trinity Church Parish in New York City.

Carpenter then authored the polemic Memoirs of the Hon. Thomas Jefferson in two volumes published in New York in 1809, edited the Mirror of Taste, and Dramatic Censor magazine, four volumes of which were published at Philadelphia in 1810–1811, and several other literary works. He is thought to have moved about 1812 to Washington, D.C. as a result of government employment.

Carpenter died in Philadelphia, Pennsylvania, on 24 July 1830. His obituary was carried in several Southern newspapers, stating that he was 78 years of age and his death resulted from the effects of paralysis suffered for six years.
