= Cecelia Svinth Carpenter =

American historian (1924–2010)

- Born: September 2, 1924; Roy, Washington, U.S.
- Died: June 25, 2010 (aged 85); Tacoma, Washington, U.S.
- Education: Pacific Lutheran University
- Occupations: Historian, writer, publisher
- Known for: Nisqually people historian

Hope Cecelia Svinth Carpenter (September 2, 1924 – June 25, 2010) was the first historian to write in detail about the Nisqually people. As a Tacoma, Washington schoolteacher and enrolled member of the Nisqually tribe, when Carpenter discovered that her students' history books provided an inaccurate relation of the history of native people, she began researching and writing the tribe's history to set the record straight.

Relying upon only primary sources and original documents, which took her to distant archival repositories such as the U.S. National Archives in Washington, D.C., and London, England to locate original materials, she authored some 23 books.

Carpenter's expertise in writing and disseminating the history of the Nisqually people as a record of and supplement to their rich traditional oral history earned her the office of Nisqually tribal historian, chief consultant on Indian history for the permanent exhibit of the Washington State Historical Society, and curator of the society's Remembering Medicine Creek exhibit at the Washington State History Museum.

== Personal ==
Daughter of Hans Svinth, a Danish-born Lutheran pastor, and Mary Svinth, a Nisqually woman, Carpenter was the twelfth of thirteen children raised on a family farm seven miles east of Roy, Washington. At age 17, she married Marvin G. Carpenter and began raising a family. When her children were older, she returned to school and earned her high-school diploma through night school. She went on to earn a bachelor's degree in 1966 and a master's degree at Pacific Lutheran University, and to teach in the public schools for sixteen years in Tacoma at the junior-high and high-school levels. She died June 25, 2010, in Tacoma, Washington, at the age of 85.

== Awards ==
Carpenter won many awards during her writing career, including the Washington State Governor's Ethnic Heritage Award in 1990, an honorary Doctor of Humane Letters from the University of Puget Sound in 1993, the Pacific Lutheran University Distinguished Alumnus Award for achievement of professional distinction through sustained dedication and service in 1994, a Murray Morgan award from the Tacoma Historical Society in 1994, and the Award of Merit from the American Association for State and Local History in 2003.

== Selected works ==
- The Troubled Waters of Medicine Creek : An Investigation into the Nature of the Fishing Rights Arising from the Medicine Creek Indian Treaty of 1854 (Thesis, Pacific Lutheran University, 1971)
- They Walked Before : The Indians of Washington State (1977)
- How to Research American Indian Blood Lines : A Manual on Indian Genealogical Research (1984)
- Fort Nisqually : A Documented History of Indian and British Interaction (1986)
- Leschi : Last Chief of the Nisquallies (1986)
- Where the Waters Begin : The Traditional Nisqually Indian History of Mount Rainier (1994)
- The Treaties, The Councils & The Reservation (Washington State Capital Museum, 1992)
- The Seasonal Round of Life in Traditional Times (Washington State Capital Museum, 1992)
- Tears of Internment : The Indian History of Fox Island and the Puget Sound Indian War (1996)
- The Nisqually—My People : The Traditional and Transitional History of the Nisqually Indian People (2002)
- Remembering Medicine Creek: The Story of the First Treaty Signed in Washington, with Maria Pascually (2005)
- Stolen Lands : The Story of the Dispossessed Nisquallies (2007)
- Nisqually Indian Tribe (2008)
