= Eliza Carpenter =

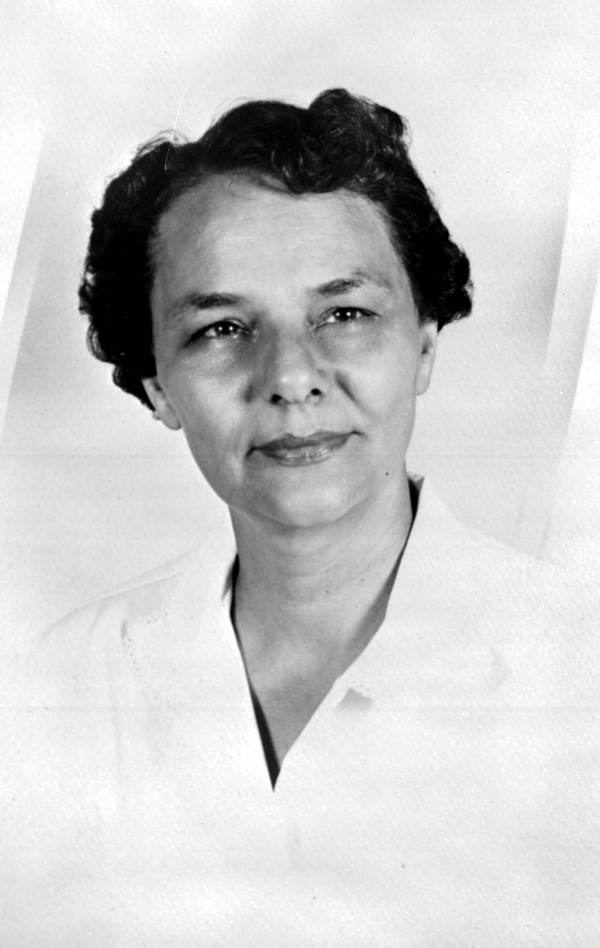
- Born: c. 1851; Virginia
- Died: December 16, 1924; Oklahoma
- Known for: Early African-American horse racer and Oklahoma pioneer

Eliza Carpenter (c. 1851 – December 16, 1924) was a race horse owner and jockey who was born into slavery and achieved success as the only African-American horse racer in early Oklahoma. For more than thirty years she owned and raced a number of Thoroughbred horses in country circuits, winning many races and considerable money.

== Biography ==
Carpenter was born in Virginia about 10 years prior to the outbreak of the American Civil War. At age 6, Carpenter was sold to a slave owner in Madison County, Kentucky. Two years later, at age 8, she was sold to a planter in Missouri. Gaining her freedom at the end of the Civil War, she returned to Madisonville, Kentucky, where she learned the business of buying, training, and riding race horses. She then moved to Kansas where she purchased several horses.

When the Cherokee Outlet was opened for settlement in 1893, she joined in the race for new land. A $1,000 (~$35,833 in 2025) prize was offered to the first person to reach the site of Ponca City, generating a heated race with Carpenter as one of the competitors. She covered twelve miles in forty-five minutes. Some sources say that she was the first to stake a claim, while other sources say that she did not win the race. She reportedly staked out a good farm, but lost it due to describing its metes and bounds inaccurately at the land office.

By 1900 Carpenter was living at 491 Grand Avenue in Ponca City, Oklahoma where her occupation was given in that year's United States census as a "trader [of] live stock." The same record shows her to be a single woman, born in December 1851.

In Ponca City, she trained Thoroughbreds, quarter horses, and other horses for racing, becoming one of the few African-American stable owners in the American West. When dissatisfied with the way a race was going, she sometimes would ride her own horses as a jockey, winning some races. Recorded names of her horses include "Irish Maid", "Blue Bird", "Jimmy Rain", "Sam Carpenter", and "Little Brown Jug", the last of which she reportedly raced at Tijuana, Baja California.

In a September 1920 recreation of the 1893 Cherokee Outlet land rush, Carpenter won the race, driving two fast ponies hitched to a buggy while standing erect like a Roman charioteer.

On a visit to family in Kentucky in 1924, she was thrown from a buggy when her Thoroughbred horse spooked, suffering a fractured skull. She returned to Ponca City in August 1924 where she suffered a stroke resulting in paralysis, and died on Tuesday, December 16, 1924.
