= General Carpenter =

General Carpenter may refer to:

- Benjamin Carpenter (British Army officer) (c. 1713/14–1788), British Army general
- Bill Carpenter (born 1937), U.S. Army lieutenant general
- Charles I. Carpenter (1906–1994), U.S. Air Force major general
- George Carpenter, 1st Baron Carpenter (1657–1731), British Army lieutenant general
- John Carpenter (British Army officer) (1894−1967), British Army major general
- John Wilson Carpenter III (1916–1996), U.S. Air Force lieutenant general
- Raymond W. Carpenter (born 1948), U.S. Army major general

== See also ==
- Marcel Carpentier (1895–1977), French Army general
