= James Carpenter (cricketer) =

English cricketer (born 1975)

Personal information
- Full name: James Robert Carpenter
- Born: 20 October 1975 (age 51); Birkenhead, Cheshire, England
- Batting: Left-handed
- Bowling: Slow left-arm orthodox

Domestic team information
- Years: Team
- 1997–2002: Sussex
- 1996: Cheshire

Career statistics
Competition	First-class	List A
Matches	13	57
Runs scored	383	827
Batting average	15.95	22.97
100s/50s	–/2	–/5
Top score	65	64*
Balls bowled	129	6
Wickets	1	–
Bowling average	81.00	–
5 wickets in innings	–	–
10 wickets in match	–	–
Best bowling	1/50	–
Catches/stumpings	5/–	29/–
- Source: Cricinfo, 8 January 2012

James Robert Carpenter (born 20 October 1975) is a former English cricketer. Carpenter was a left-handed batsman who bowled slow left-arm orthodox. He was born at Birkenhead, Cheshire.

Carpenter made a single Minor Counties Championship appearance for Cheshire against Oxfordshire in 1996, before joining Sussex in 1997. In that same year he made his first-class debut for the county against Surrey in the County Championship. He made infrequent appearances for Sussex in first-class cricket, making twelve more appearances, the last of which came against New Zealand A in 2000. In his thirteen first-class appearances, he scored a total of 383 runs at an average of 15.95, with a high score of 65. This score, which was one of two first-class fifties he made, came against Nottinghamshire in 1998.

In his debut season, Carpenter also made his List A debut against Surrey in the 1997 AXA Life League. Utilised more by Sussex in the shorter format of the game, Carpenter made a total of 57 List A appearances. His appearances in this format went beyond his final first-class appearance in 2000, with his final List A match coming against Hampshire in the 2002 Norwich Union League. The majority of his List A appearances came in the 1998 and 1999 seasons, after which he found his opportunities limited. In his 57 List A matches, Carpenter scored a total of 827 runs at an average of 22.97, with a high score of 64 not out. This score was one of five half centuries he made in that format and came against Nottinghamshire in 1999. He was released by Sussex at the end of the 2002 season.
