= Francis Carpenter =

Francis Carpenter may refer to:

- Francis Bicknell Carpenter (1830–1900), American painter
- Francis M. Carpenter (1834–1919), American politician
- Francis W. Carpenter (1831–1922), American businessman
- Francis Carpenter (actor) (1910–1973), American actor

== See also ==
- Frances Carpenter (1890–1972), American folklorist, author, and photographer
- Frances Carpenter, Countess of Tyrconnel, Irish countess
- Frank Carpenter (disambiguation)
