= Moses Carpenter =

- Skaroniate
- Born: Ska-Run-Ya-Te or Skaroniate; 1854; Grand River Territory, Canada
- Died: August 15, 1889 (aged 35); Middlesbrough, North Riding of Yorkshire, England
- Citizenship: Six Nations of the Grand River First Nation
- Occupation: Traveling medicine show member (at time of death)
- Known for: Died in England, Repatriation controversy

Moses Carpenter (Mohawk: Skaroniate, 1854-1889) was a Six Nations of the Grand River First Nation Native American whose proposed repatriation from England to his ancestral home in southern Ontario, Canada generated controversy in 2008.

Carpenter was born Ska-Run-Ya-Te (or Skaroniate) in Ontario, Canada in 1854, as a member of the Mohawk tribe, reportedly of the Wolf clan of the Six Nations. In the 1880s, he journeyed from his native Canada to Great Britain to join a traveling medicine show that sold alleged cures for illnesses ranging from rheumatism to the common cold. Contemporary reports state that the arrival of the show caravan created a spectacle that attracted large crowds wherever it set up camp. Using his Mohawk name, he and other members of the show provided entertainment as teeth were extracted and potions applied by the show's leader, a man who billed himself as "Sequah," but was actually an Englishman whose real name was reportedly William Hannaway Rowe.

Not long after the show arrived in Middlesbrough, North Yorkshire in August 1889, Carpenter developed a fever, and died on August 15, 1889, in the town's North Riding Infirmary. He had reportedly converted to the Church of England, and was interred in accordance with Church of England rites. His funeral, held at St. Paul's Church three days after his death, was said to have generated the largest turnout since the funeral of the town's first mayor a decade earlier. A poem written by a local girl was inscribed on his gravestone, which became a landmark, with people laying feathers at his grave over the years. Recently, restoration of the gravestone was undertaken to repair deterioration and vandalism.

== Controversy ==
In 2008, the efforts of a Middlesbrough resident led to the discovery of Carpenter's origins by a Canadian Native American. A former board member of the National Museum of the American Indian proposed taking a Mohawk party to Middlesbrough to perform traditional rites at the gravesite, and repatriating Carpenter's remains to Canada. Others disagreed, with one researcher and Six Nations member stating that since Carpenter had converted to the Church of England, traditional tribal rites would not need to be performed.

Obtaining permissions for the repatriation complicates the proposed actions. Although the town owns the cemetery, the Church of England has legal jurisdiction over the grave, and British law requires permission from church authorities for disinterments from consecrated ground. Both Canadian and British law must be observed, and permission must be granted from several other authorities, including the local town council and the Mohawk council. In addition, contact must be made with Carpenter's family before seeking permission from Middlesbrough Council and the British Government for removal of the remains.
