= Lewis Carpenter (disambiguation) =

Lewis C. Carpenter (1836–1908) was a U.S. representative from South Carolina.

Lewis Carpenter may also refer to:

- Lew Carpenter, American football player and coach
- Lew Carpenter (baseball)

== See also ==
- Louis Carpenter (disambiguation)
