= Hermon P. Carpenter =

American educator (1877–1958)

- Born: September 5, 1877; Boyle County, Kentucky
- Died: August 12, 1958 (aged 80); Montverde, Lake County, Florida
- Known for: Educator

Hermon Palestine Carpenter (September 5, 1877 – August 12, 1958), was an educator and founder of Montverde Industrial School, now Montverde Academy, in Montverde, Florida in 1912.

== Personal ==
Carpenter was a native of Boyle County, Kentucky, a son of James B. and Augusta Carpenter. He married on July 27, 1909, to Halcyon Parrish, who served as "lady principal" of the Montverde School. Carpenter's family was of Germanic descent, from George Zimmerman (which Anglicizes to Carpenter), who was born ca. 1720 in Switzerland, emigrated to colonial Pennsylvania around 1740, and settled in Rockingham County, Virginia prior to the American Revolutionary War.

== Education ==
Carpenter graduated from Sue Bennett Memorial School, now Sue Bennett College, at London, Kentucky, and worked his way through Kentucky Wesleyan College, where he received the Bachelor of Arts degree in 1909.

== Career ==
After leaving college Carpenter became business manager of Asbury College at Wilmore, Kentucky, where he remained a year and then accepted the same position with his alma mater, Kentucky Wesleyan College, where he also remained a year, and then became President of the Epworth Training School at South Bend, Indiana, for a year.

Believing that there was a need for a practical type of education for American boys and girls that would "train the heart, head and hand," Carpenter went to Florida in 1912 for the purpose of founding an institution in which students had to exert physical labor in addition to classroom labor. After making a complete survey of the state he decided to found his school at Montverde, where he purchased considerable acreage and built a small school building. Early students built some of the original buildings and furniture, planted crops, tended livestock and performed other duties in order to help pay their tuition. The Montverde School grew into one of the largest and best known boarding schools in the United States and is well known abroad. In 1958, the Montverde School's executive committee authorized construction of the first of two boys' dormitory units and voted unanimously to name it Carpenter Hall in memory of H. P. Carpenter, founder of the Montverde School and president for 35 years, who retired in 1947.

In addition to his connection with the Montverde School, Carpenter speculated in real estate and farmed oranges in Montverde.
