= Senator Carpenter =

Senator Carpenter may refer to:

- B. Platt Carpenter (1837–1921), New York State Senate
- Dennis Carpenter (1928–2003), California State Senate
- Elisha Carpenter (1824–1897), Connecticut State Senate
- Francis M. Carpenter (1834–1919), New York State Senate
- J. L. Carpenter (1839–1919), Ohio State Senate
- Jared Carpenter (born 1977), Kentucky State Senate
- Matthew H. Carpenter (1824–1881), U.S. Senator from Wisconsin
- Michael E. Carpenter (born 1947), Maine State Senate
- Paul B. Carpenter (1928–2002), California State Senate
- Robert C. Carpenter (1924–2011), North State Senate
- Terry Carpenter (1900–1978), Nebraska State Senate
- Tim Carpenter (born 1960), Wisconsin State Senate

== See also ==
- Senator Carpentier (disambiguation)
