= Justice Carpenter =

Justice Carpenter may refer to:

- Alonzo P. Carpenter (1829–1898), associate justice of the New Hampshire Supreme Court
- Elisha Carpenter (1824–1897), associate justice of the Connecticut Supreme Court
- George Moulton Carpenter Jr. (1844–1896), associate justice of the Rhode Island Supreme Court
- Thomas Preston Carpenter (1804–1876), associate justice of the Supreme Court of New Jersey

== See also ==
- Judge Carpenter (disambiguation)
