= Sam Carpenter (footballer) =

Australian rules footballer (born 1987)

Samuel Carpenter (born 1987) is an Australian rules football player notable for reaching the level of the Victorian Football League despite the loss of an arm.

Carpenter, recruited from Hastings, Victoria, played for the TAC Cup side Dandenong Stingrays, where he debuted in 2004. When Carpenter was four years old, he got his hand caught in a meat mincer at his father's butcher shop, requiring the amputation of half of his left arm just below the elbow. Carpenter has a short, blunt stump of his forearm, which he is able to hold and manipulate objects with. Despite this handicap, he says he has become accustomed to living without it and has forged a career in Australian rules football.

In 2006 Carpenter made his Victorian Football League debut for the Frankston Dolphins and his talent has given hope to many handicapped youngsters willing to play football.

Carpenter left Frankston Dolphins at the end of 2007, and went on to play suburban and country football for a variety of clubs, including Corowa Rutherglen, Wangaratta Rovers, Chelsea and Aspley. In 2009, while playing for Corowa Rutherglen, he was runner-up for the Morris Medal (the Ovens & Murray Football League Best and Fairest award).
