= China: The Rebirth of an Empire =

2010 American documentary film

- Directed by: Jeremy Veverka; Jesse Veverka
- Starring: Tenzin Choeying; Kunda Dixit; Chalmers Johnson; Wei Jingsheng; Rebiya Kadeer; Freddy Lim
- Release date: September 4, 2010 (Central Florida Film Festival)
- Running time: 86 minutes
- Country: United States
- Language: English

China: The Rebirth of an Empire is an American documentary film directed by brothers Jesse and Jeremy Veverka that was released in 2010. The film examines China's economic and political rise in the context of its relationship with its neighbors and a declining United States. The film was named Best Documentary at the 2011 River Bend Film Festival, the 2010 Central Florida Film Festival, the 2010 Astoria/Long Island City Film Festival, and the 2010 Big Easy International Film Festival. It was reported that the film may have contributed to the Chinese government blocking access to the Internet Movie Database in early 2010 due to political censorship. The film features interviews with late Asia expert Chalmers Johnson.
