= Ellen Maria Carpenter =

American painter

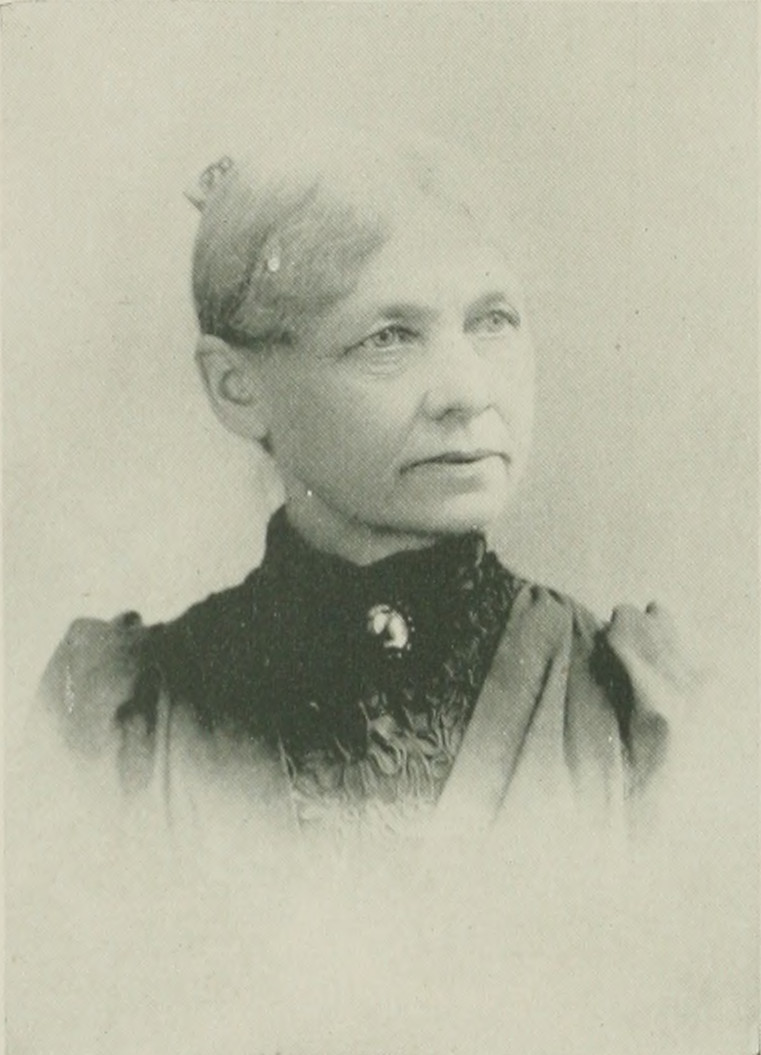
- Born: November 28, 1830; Killingly
- Died: July 1, 1908 (aged 77); Boston
- Occupation: Painter, artist

Ellen Maria Carpenter (November 28, 1830 – July 1, 1908) was an American landscape and portrait painter.

Ellen Maria Carpenter was born on November 28, 1830 in Killingly, Connecticut. She was educated at Milford High School and studied art under Thomas Edwards and Lowell Institute in Boston. She later studied under Tony Robert-Fleury in Europe.

She painted numerous landscapes and was noted for her depictions of the White Mountains of New Hampshire. She travelled extensively and painted scenes from California, Algeria, Egypt, Italy, and Spain. Walter Shaw Sparrow wrote that her "landscape art reveals at times the menacing suggestion of great rivers and of high solitary mountains."

Ellen Maria Carpenter died on July 1, 1908, in Boston.
