= Michael Carpenter =

Michael Carpenter may refer to:

- Michael E. Carpenter (born 1947), former Maine Attorney General
- Michael Carpenter (tennis) (1936–2025), Canadian tennis player
- Michael Carpenter (politician), 19th-century mayor of Lancaster, Pennsylvania
- Michael R. Carpenter, American diplomat
- Michael Carpenter, fictional character in The Dresden Files
- Michael Carpenter, protagonist of the novel In Limbo
