= David Aaron Carpenter =

American violist (born 1986)

- Born: April 5, 1986; New York City, U.S.
- Genre: Classical music
- Occupation: Violist
- Instrument: Viola
- Years active: 2003-present

David Aaron Carpenter (born 5 April 1986) is an American violist and was the first Prize Winner of the 2006 Walter W. Naumburg Viola Competition. Together with his siblings, he formed the Salomé Chamber Orchestra.

== Early life and education ==
Carpenter was born in 1986 to parents, Dennis Carpenter and Grace. Dennis was a history professor at Long Island University and Grace taught English to new immigrants. Grace is the daughter of Iraqi Jewish immigrants who emigrated to Israel before settling in the United States. Grace raised David and his siblings after divorcing Dennis. David grew up in Great Neck, Long Island, and began studying the violin at the age of six under the Suzuki method. At 12, he embarked upon learning the viola and by the time he was 16, the viola had become his primary instrument. He continued to pursue both instruments at the pre-college divisions of Juilliard School and the Manhattan School of Music, Italy’s Accademia Chigiana, Switzerland’s International Music Academy, and the Verbier Festival Academy, studying with Pinchas Zukerman, Roberto Diaz, Seiji Ozawa, Robert Mann, Nobuko Imai, Boris Belkin, and Yuri Bashmet. In 2004, Carpenter was named a national YoungArts winner and a U.S Presidential Scholar of the Arts, as part of the Presidential Scholars Program. He graduated from Princeton University with a degree in politics and international relations in 2008.

== Career ==
Since 2003 Carpenter has been performing with leading musicians and orchestras in the United States and Europe. As the First Prize winner of the 2005 Philadelphia Orchestra Young Artists Competition, he performed the Walton Viola Concerto with the Philadelphia Orchestra under the baton of Christoph Eschenbach. He has made his recital debuts in the United States at venues as Carnegie Hall and the Kennedy Center. He made his debut in Germany with the Staatskapelle Dresden performing the Schnittke Viola Concerto. In 2008, he was Maxim Vengerov’s last-minute replacement for performances of Benjamin Yusupov's Viola, Tango, Rock Concerto with the Lucerne Symphony Orchestra in Switzerland. He has performed in the United States at Avery Fisher Hall, Chicago’s Krannert Center, and San Francisco’s Herbst Theatre, among other venues. In September, David released his first recording on the Ondine label with a viola version of the Elgar Cello Concerto (arr. Lionel Tertis/Carpenter) and the Schnittke Viola Concerto with the Philharmonia Orchestra under Christoph Eschenbach. The disc received international acclaim and received awards such as the Editor’s Choice Award by Gramophone Magazine and Disc of the Month by The New Yorker. Carpenter was also the recipient of the 2010 Avery Fisher Career Grant.

In 2006, Carpenter was selected as a protégé by mentor Pinchas Zukerman as part of the Rolex Mentor and Protégé Arts Initiative, an international philanthropic programme that pairs masters in their disciplines with emerging talents for a year of one-to-one creative exchange. In the same year he won both Philadelphia Orchestra’s young artist competition and the Walter W. Naumburg Viola Competition.

He collaborated in recital and chamber music concerts with Emanuel Ax, Sarah Chang, Leonidas Kavakos, Sol Gabetta, Julian Rachlin, Dmitry Sitkovetsky, Jean-Yves Thibaudet, and Yuja Wang and performs regularly at the Schleswig-Holstein and Verbier Music Festivals. David was designated a Presidential Scholar and received the Presidential Gold Medal at The Kennedy Center. In addition to his musical accomplishments, David received his A.B. degree in Political Science and International Relations from Princeton University in 2008.

Together with his siblings he formed the Salomé Chamber Orchestra, soon turning it into a professional venture with David directing concerts at the Metropolitan Museum of Art. It quickly gained a reputation as one of New York’s top young groups, comprising recent graduates from the major conservatories and Ivy League universities such as Yale and Princeton. He also performs with his siblings, together the trio are known as The Carpenters. With their mother, Grace, they run Carpenter Fine Violins, which deals in valuable violins.

In 2015 he appeared alongside his siblings in Highly Strung, a documentary by Australian director Scott Hicks. The film depicts attempts by the Ngeringa Arts Centre to obtain four rare and valuable Guadagnini violins for the Australian String Quartet (ASQ), and portrays the relationships within the ASQ, the wealthy arts patron, Ulrike Klein (founder of Jurlique) who purchases the violins, The Carpenters. He said of the film: "This was about the people. People who are obsessed with what they're doing. Whether they're musicians, investors, dealers... they’re all obsessed".

In April 2016, Carpenter released his debut solo album on Warner Classics, a program of 12 Seasons, including Vivaldi and Piazzolla in viola arrangement, and a new work composed specially for the Salomé Orchestra by Alexey Shor: Four Seasons of Manhattan.
