= Ed Carpenter =

Ed or Eddie Carpenter may refer to:

- Eddie Carpenter (1887–1963), American ice hockey player
- Ed J. Carpenter (1900–1965), American politician, member of the Texas House of Representatives
- Ed Carpenter (artist), American artist
- Ed Carpenter (racing driver) (born 1981), American open wheel driver
  - Ed Carpenter Racing, a racing team
- Ed Carpenter (cricketer) (born 1982), English cricketer
- Ed Carpenter, former member of the band Brand New Sin

== See also ==
- Edmund Carpenter (disambiguation)
- Edward Carpenter (disambiguation)
- Ted Carpenter (disambiguation)
