= Henry Carpenter =

Henry Carpenter may refer to:

- Henry Bernard Carpenter (1840–1890), Unitarian clergyman and poet
- Henry Carpenter (boxer) (1925–2001), British boxer
- Henry Cort Harold Carpenter (1875–1940), British metallurgist
- Henry le Carpenter, MP for Derby in 1325
- Henry Carpenter (priest) (1606–1662), Canon of Windsor 1662

== See also ==
- Henry Boyd-Carpenter (born 1939), solicitor
- Harry Carpenter (disambiguation)
