= Iris Carpenter =

British journalist, author and war correspondent

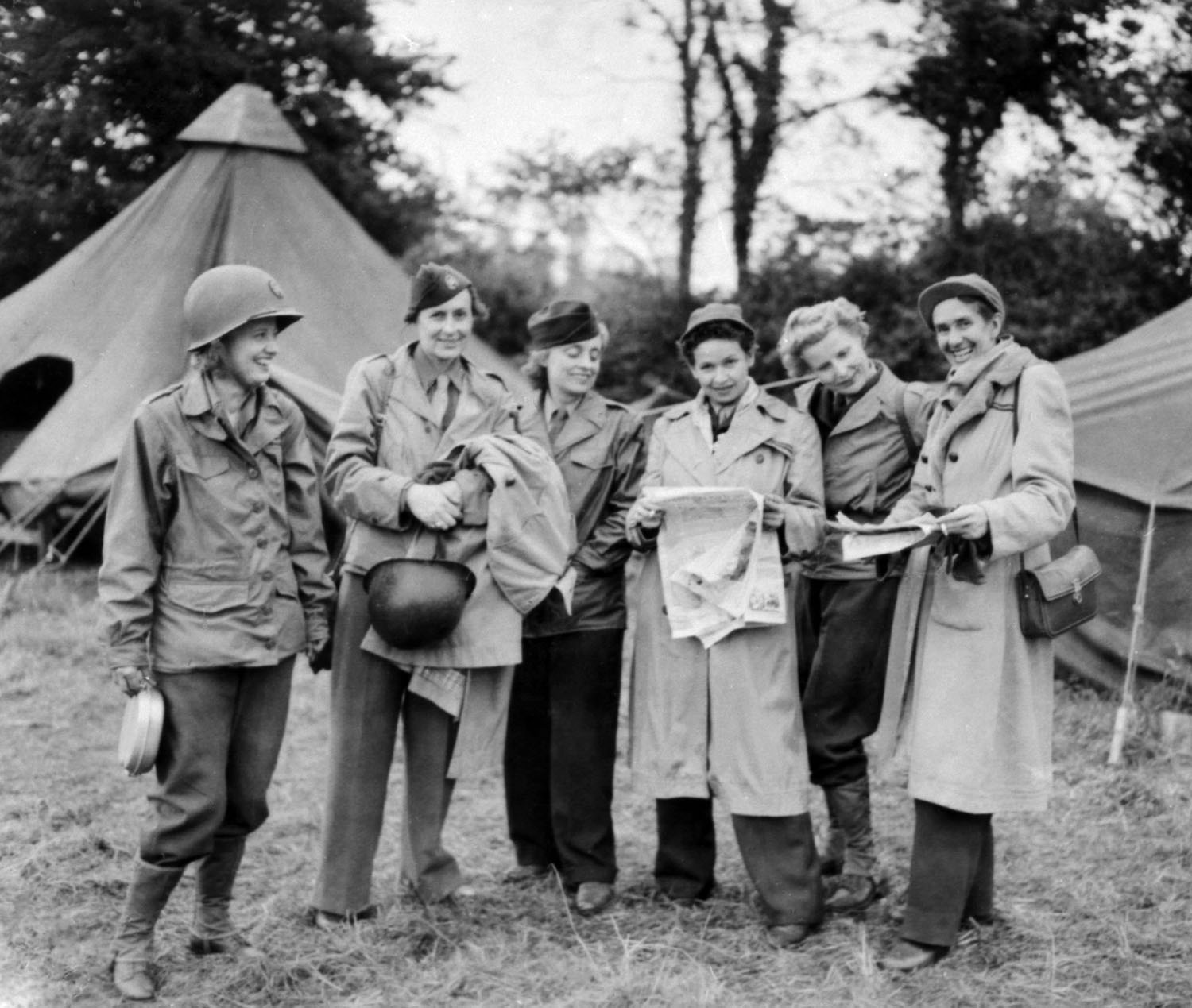
- Ruth Cowan, Sonia Tomara, Rosette Hargrove, Betty Knox, Iris Carpenter, Erika Mann (from left to right)
- Born: Iris Nell Carpenter; September 21, 1904; England
- Died: October 7, 1997 (aged 93); Anne Arundel County, Maryland, U.S.
- Resting place: Hillcrest Memorial Gardens and Chapel Mausoleum Annapolis, Anne Arundel County, Maryland, U.S.
- Occupations: Journalist, author, reporter
- Notable work: No Woman's World (1946)

Iris Nell Carpenter Akers (September 21, c. 1904 – October 7, 1997) was a British journalist, author and war correspondent known for her frontline publications during World War II as a female journalist. Carpenter started her writing career in 1924 but resigned from her position to focus on raising her two children. When the Second World War broke out in England, Carpenter returned to journalism and worked with the Daily Herald, the London Daily Express and as a BBC broadcaster. During the war, Carpenter and her family moved to the United States after her position as a frontline war correspondent with the British army was denied. She began to write for the Boston Globe as a journalist, and for the U.S. Office of Education. Carpenter also hosted episodes as a radio broadcaster with the Voice of America and was a member of the American Women in Radio and Television.

== Early life ==
Carpenter was born on September 21, c.1904 in England, the daughter of a wealthy cinema entrepreneur. Her upbringing and exposure to cinema helped her successfully land a position as a film critic in 1924 through a British publication called The Picture Show.

Inspired by this field, Carpenter began her career as a journalist with the Daily Express in London.

In 1933, Carpenter stepped down from her position as a journalist to focus on raising her two children, Brian Scruby and Patricia Perry, with her first husband, Charles Scruby who was known to be a successful property developer.

== Career ==
The First US Army were the American troops Carpenter reported through on the frontlines during WWII.

In the early phase of World War II, Carpenter witnessed five German planes being shot down close to her home. Carpenter decided to return to her career as a journalist and began working with the Daily Herald in London to cover special war reports such as the Blitz. She also worked as a BBC broadcaster and print reporter for the Daily Express and the Daily Herald in 1940, where she wrote a great deal of the war frontlines. Her reports included bloodshed, destruction, and heroic acts of courage in the Battle of Britain.

Carpenter was determined to position herself in the frontlines and document the conflict in Europe. In 1942, Carpenter applied to the British Expeditionary Force, convinced that her previous experiences as a war correspondent earned her spot alongside the Allied invasion of Europe. However, her application was vetoed and ultimately rejected by British military authorities.

Carpenter decided to move to America where she successfully found a position with the Boston Globe as a frontline journalist. After meeting with Carlyle Holt, another war correspondent from Boston Globe, she was accepted and joined the U.S. 1st Army as a war correspondent and documented the American involvement during the war.

Carpenter noted that female reporters were received more positively with American troops. It was emphasized by Colonel Andres of the U.S. 1st Army, claiming that all women under his jurisdiction would receive equal treatment and that American officials acknowledged that women excelled at covering specific areas of war.

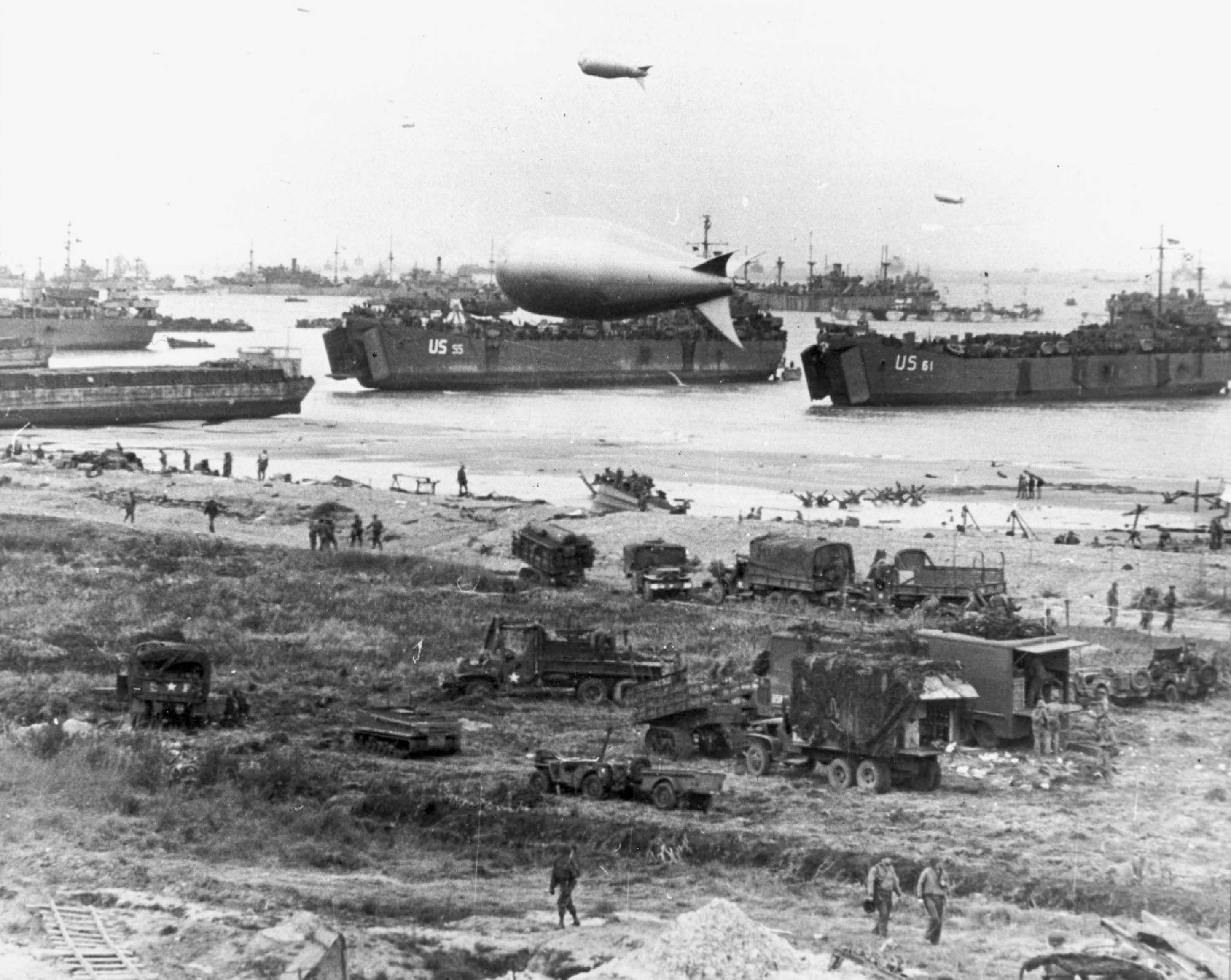
Normandy beachhead. Female war correspondents were ordered to remain on the strip unlike their male counterparts.

Four days after D-Day, June 10, 1944, Iris Carpenter arrived on the Allied-controlled air strips of Normandy, one of the first women to do so in an ambulance plane. Iris documented the discrimination and hostility of the British War Office toward female reporters, emphasising that the BWO felt that women would distract their soldiers from their duties.

Although Carpenter was given frontline positions, her role did not equate to other war correspondents. When she arrived with her fellow correspondent Cornelius Ryan on site, Ryan was granted access into Normandy whereas Carpenter was limited to a beachhead airstrip. Other reports included her experiences at hospitals and war-torn villages.

Carpenter was fully accredited to accompany the First Army in December 1944 as they advanced in France towards an immediate beachhead at Normandy and alongside the Allied forces as the German troops retreated across the River Orne.

During one of her visits to London, Carpenter was accused of violating press regulations and policies when she transferred her position along the frontlines with the American troops. Carpenter countered the allegation, explaining that the beachhead area changed due to natural conditions and that no press regulations were violated.

Following the Paris liberation in August 1944, Carpenter continued to report on the war despite having shattered an eardrum, being caught in a storm, and travelling under precarious circumstances.

Carpenter documented the participation of American troops, the reactions of local individuals toward Nazi oppression, experiences of wounded soldiers, concentration camps, and the stories of medical staff. Events covered by Carpenter include but are not limited to the London Blitz in 1940, the Normandy invasion included the bombing of Saint-Lô, Battle of Arnhem, Battle of Huertgen Forest, Battle of the Bulge, and Rhine.

== Later life ==
After the war had ended, Carpenter divorced her first husband, Charles Scruby. She remarried to American Colonel and the First Army's operations officer, Russel F. Akers Jr. on January 20, 1946. Akers was the operations officer of the First Army, the American army she had been following during the war. Carpenter moved to the United States with her children shortly thereafter.

In June 1945, Carpenter completed her war time reports and began working with the Voice of America. In 1946, she published her war memoir, No Woman's World, accounting the experiences of other female reporters and noting the challenges facing women reporters on the frontlines during World War Two.

She later settled in Virginia, United States.

Iris Carpenter died on October 7, 1997, at the age of 93 due to heart failure at North Arundel Hospital in Glen Burnie.

== Legacy ==
Iris Carpenter was a prominent British journalist and war correspondent who wrote for London's Daily Herald, London Daily Express, and the Boston Globe. Her work with the BBC broadcast and the Voice of America remains in the archives today.

Carpenter was known to be one of the few women to report the Allied invasions in Europe from June 1944, making her publications more pronounced and well known during World War II. The articles published across UK and U.S. media ports along with her memoir, No Woman's World, include personal anecdotes and frontline reports based on interviews held from hospitals in France and Germany, along with documentation of the liberation of Nazi concentration camps.

Iris Carpenter became a member with the Voice of America after the war.

Some of her most reputable pieces include reports on the Battle of the Bulge and the liberation of Nazi concentration camps, both of which were featured on the Boston Globe. Her courage to write from the frontlines was a momentous leap for female journalists, which enabled them to focus beyond the gendered norms. Her push towards war contribution also demonstrated that women are not stuck to being confined to small narratives in the journalist world, reinforcing the notion that women do have equal qualifications as men.

In 1946, her memoir, No Woman's World, recounted her wartime experiences during World War II. The memoir talks about the uncertainty and vulnerability female reporters faced on site, while also encountering various gendered rules they had to agree upon to keep their positions. Some of these rules included the restriction of female reporters and their topics, prompting that female journalists should cover news topics regarding the home-front. Other rules suggested women should be nowhere remotely near the war frontlines.

Carpenter struggled to fight for the same rights as male correspondents within the press camps and recognized the difficulty in gaining equal access to her male counterparts. Despite the obstacles she encountered, she was known to bypass restrictions and rules in order to get frontline stories that were weighed just as importantly as male journalists.

Carpenter's memoir brought to light the difficulties that female correspondents faced, and efforts that female journalists needed to put in, in order to gain the a little bit of respect. She proved that women did not only have to report on hospitals and domestic situations through her memoir.

Her fearlessness brought her to follow the US Army from the Battle of Arnhem through Antwerp, Aachen and the Rhine. She was also present during the Battle of Hurtgen Forest and stayed with the army until the Battle of Bulge. These newspaper clips have now become important pieces of history that she had risked her life to gather. Her memoir depicts her journey as well as stories of American soldiers caring for each other throughout the war. These accomplishments paved the way for future female journalists to gain the same treatment as male journalists in the field.

== Publications ==
Memoir: No Woman's World (1946)

== See also ==
- The Boston Globe
- Cornelius Ryan
- Women in journalism
