= Maggie Carpenter =

Maggie Carpenter may refer to:

- Maggie Carpenter (One Life to Live), fictional character on the American soap opera One Life to Live
- Maggie Carpenter, main character in Runaway Bride (1999 film)

== See also ==
- Margaret Carpenter (disambiguation)
