= Donald Carpenter =

Donald Carpenter may refer to:

- Donald M. Carpenter (1894–1940), United States Navy naval aviator
- Donald F. Carpenter (1899–1985), American businessman
- Donald Carpenter (singer), singer with Submersed
- Don Carpenter (electrical engineer), professor of electrical engineering at Stanford University

== See also ==
- Don Carpenter (1931–1995), American writer
