= Joseph Carpenter =

Joseph Carpenter may refer to:

- Joseph Edwards Carpenter (1813–1885), English playwright and songwriter
- Joseph Estlin Carpenter (1844–1927), Unitarian minister, principal of Manchester College, Oxford
- Joe Carpenter (rugby union), English rugby union player
- Joe Carpenter (R.O.D), fictional character in Japanese novel, Read or Die
