= George Johnston (burgess) =

American politician (1702–1766)

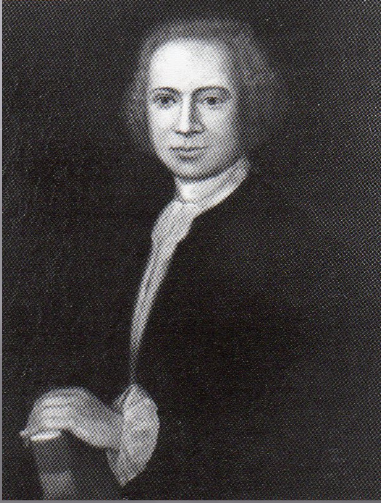
- George Johnston

Member of the Virginia House of Burgesses
- In office 1758–1765

Personal details
- Born: September 3, 1702
- Died: August 29, 1766 (aged 63)
- Spouses: Margaret Thompson; Sarah McCarty c. 1724 - c. 1785
- Children: 12

George Johnston (September 3, 1702 – August 29, 1766) was a lawyer in Fairfax County, Virginia, while it was a British colony. He was twice elected to the House of Burgesses, in the assemblies of 1758-61 and 1761–65. On May 30, 1765, Johnston seconded Patrick Henry's speech advocating for resolutions against the Stamp Act. Johnston was elected to a third term, but died before the assembly reconvened. The portrait shown to the right hangs to this day in the Fairfax County Courthouse. The Fairfax Co. manager of historical records believes that he is one of the "lost Founding Fathers" due to his early death. His death was reported in the Virginia Gazette on September 19, 1766.

He was first married to Margaret Thompson and had 3 children by her: Mary (married Rev. Lee Massey), Sarah (married Robert Harrison), and Peggy (married a Mr. Chattin). Johnston then married Sarah McCarty (c. 1724 - c. 1785), daughter of Major Dennis McCarty from Westmoreland County, Virginia. He had nine children by Sarah: George, William, Archibald, Hanaugh, Sarah Anne, Betty, Wilfred and Dennis McCarty J.. His son, Lt. Col George Johnston Jr. was Aide-de-camp and confidential military secretary to General George Washington from December 1776 until his death at Morristown, New Jersey, in May 1777.

As a burgess, Johnston made a motion to resolve the House into a committee of the whole, seconded by Patrick Henry, at which time their coalition brought forth a shocking series of resolutions now known as the Stamp Act Resolutions. The House of Burgesses was an aristocratic company of wealthy plantation owners and gentlemen, having long operated under a relaxed rule of 24 percent constituting a quorum. With only 39 members in attendance, Johnston's motion passed, and in the absence of the House's regular leadership, all five of the offered resolutions were adopted. The first four were adopted more quickly than the fifth, which required several hours of heated debate, and even after that, passed by only one vote. There is a tribute about him given by R. Walton Moore, that was published in the William and Mary Quarterly, Vol. 2 (2), pp. 75-80 (April 1922). and the Alexandria Gazette.

George Johnston served as George Washington's attorney, and a trustee of the town of Alexandria, Virginia. At the time of his death, Washington succeeded Johnston to both positions. His son, George Johnston, served as a captain in the 5th Company, 15th Regiment of Virginia.

His Last Will & Testament was entered into Fairfax County, Virginia, records (Book B-1, pp. 432–4) on March 23, 1766, and has been transcribed . An inventory of his estate was also entered in Fairfax Co. records and is also transcribed

== See also ==
1. Fairfax County's Forgotten Patriot
