= Christine Carpenter =

Christine Carpenter may refer to:

- Christine Carpenter (anchoress), medieval anchoress of Shere Church, Surrey
- Christine Carpenter (Hollyoaks), a character on the British soap opera Hollyoaks
- Christine Carpenter (historian) (born 1946), professor of medieval English history

== See also ==
- Chris Carpenter (disambiguation)
