= Arthur Carpenter =

Arthur Carpenter may refer to:

- Arthur Carpenter (furniture maker) (1920–2006), master woodworker and furniture maker
- Arthur W. Carpenter (1891–1981), chemist
- Arthur P. Carpenter (1867–1937), attorney and government official from Vermont
- Buddy Carpenter (Arthur Leroy Carpenter, 1894–1973), American baseball player
