= Isaac Carpenter =

Isaac Carpenter may refer to:

- Isaac Carpenter (drummer) (born 1979), American drummer, percussionist, producer, audio engineer and session musician
- Isaac M. Carpenter (1920–1998), American jazz bandleader and pianist
- Isaac W. Carpenter Jr. (1893–1983), American businessman and assistant secretary of state for administration
- Isaac Carpenter (Canadian politician) (1849–1933), Canadian politician in the Legislative Assembly of New Brunswick
