= George Carpenter (footballer) =

Australian rules footballer

Personal information
- Full name: George Frederick Carpenter
- Born: 28 May 1881; Fitzroy, Victoria
- Died: 13 June 1919 (aged 38); Malvern, Victoria

Playing career^{1}
Years	Club	Games (Goals)
1901–02	St Kilda	3 (1)
- ^{1} Playing statistics correct to the end of 1902.

George Frederick Carpenter (28 May 1881 – 13 June 1919) was an Australian rules footballer who played with St Kilda in the Victorian Football League (VFL). Until his sudden death in 1919 from pneumonia, Carpenter was a member of staff for The Age newspaper.
