= Governor Carpenter =

Governor Carpenter may refer to:

- Cyrus C. Carpenter (1829–1898), 8th Governor of Iowa
- Samuel Carpenter (1649–1714), Deputy Governor of Pennsylvania from 1694 to 1698
