= Brian Carpenter =

Brian Carpenter may refer to:

- Brian Carpenter (engineer), British engineer
- Brian Carpenter (musician), American musician/composer
- Brian Carpenter (American football), American football player
