= Shelt Carpenter =

- Born: James Orval Shelton Carpenter; February 7, 1862; Braxton County, Virginia, US
- Died: April 28, 1937 (aged 75)
- Genres: Old-time music
- Instrument: Fiddle
- Years active: c. 1880–1937

Shelton "Shelt" Carpenter (February 7, 1862, at Sutton, Virginia – April 28, 1937) was an outdoorsman, fiddle player, and mountain folklife philosopher of note. He is interred in the Braxton County Memorial Gardens Cemetery at Sutton, West Virginia.
