= Christopher Carpenter =

Christopher Carpenter may refer to:

- Chris Carpenter (born 1975), American baseball player
- Chris Carpenter (baseball, born 1985), American baseball player
- Christopher S. Carpenter, American economist
- Christopher Carpenter, a pseudonym of British writer Christopher Evans

== See also ==
- Christopher Carpenter House, an historic house in Rehoboth, Massachusetts
- Chris Carpenter (disambiguation)
