= Fanny Hallock Carpenter =

American lawyer and clubwoman (1854–1939)

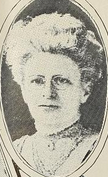
- Fanny Hallock Carpenter in 1912
- Born: Fanny Hallock Rouse; October 8, 1854; Rainbow, Connecticut, U.S.
- Died: May 10, 1939 (aged 84)
- Resting place: Manasota Cemetery
- Other name: Fanny Carpenter Snell
- Education: Mills College; New York University Law School
- Occupations: Lawyer; clubwoman
- Spouse(s): Philip Carpenter (m. 1880) Edward Lee Snell

Fanny Hallock Carpenter Snell (née Rouse; October 8, 1854 – May 10, 1939) was an American lawyer and clubwoman. She was the first woman to win a case before the New York Court of Appeals and the President of the New York State Federation of Women's Clubs.

== Biography ==
She was born as Fanny Hallock Rouse in Rainbow, Connecticut, in 1854 to Elizabeth (née Hallock) and Thomas Henderson Rouse. Her father Thomas Henderson was a Congregational minister.

She was educated at Mills College in California. Hallock married Philip Carpenter, son of Alonzo P. Carpenter, on September 3, 1880, then trained to become a lawyer after her marriage. She graduated from the New York University Law School in 1896.

Her husband died and she later married Edward Lee Snell. He also predeceased her.

She became the first woman to win a case before the New York Court of Appeals. In 1902, she testified at a Congressional hearing at the United States House of Representatives that was considering a proposal to adopt a constitutional amendment against polygamy.

In 1896, Carpenter joined the American women's club Sorosis, then became president of the organisation in 1907. She was also elected president of the New York State Federation of Women's Clubs in 1909.

She lived in Manatee County, Florida. She died on May 10, 1939. She was buried in Manasota Cemetery.
