= Harry Carpenter (disambiguation) =

Harry Carpenter (1925–2010) was a British sports commentator.

Harry Carpenter may also refer to:

- Harry Carpenter (bishop) (1901–1993), English bishop and theologian
- Harry Carpenter (priest) (1854–1936), Anglican priest
- Henry Cort Harold Carpenter (1875–1940), British metallurgist

== See also ==
- Henry Carpenter (disambiguation)
