= Chris Carpenter (disambiguation) =

Chris Carpenter (born 1975) is a retired American baseball pitcher.

Chris Carpenter may also refer to:

- Cris Carpenter (born 1965), baseball player
- Chris Carpenter (baseball, born 1985)
- Chris Carpenter (sound engineer)

== See also ==
- Christine Carpenter (disambiguation)
- Christopher Carpenter (disambiguation)
