= Scott Carpenter (disambiguation) =

Scott Carpenter is the name of:

- Scott Carpenter (1925–2013), United States astronaut
- Scott Carpenter (murderer) (1975–1997), American criminal executed in 1997
- Scott Carpenter (water polo) (born 1988), British water polo player
- Scott Carpenter, an early ring name of Canadian professional wrestler Tyson Smith (born 1983), now better known as Kenny Omega
