= Aaron Carpenter =

Aaron Carpenter may refer to:

- Aaron Carpenter (rugby union) (born 1983), Canadian rugby player
- Aaron Carpenter (artist) (born 1975), Canadian visual artist
