= A Son of the Carolinas =

- Author: Elisabeth Carpenter Satterthwait
- Genre: Historical fiction
- Publisher: Henry Altemus Company
- Publication date: 1898
- Pages: 273
- ISBN: 0-8369-9062-5
- OCLC: 1927621
- LC Class: PZ3.S2537 S

A Son of the Carolinas: A Story of the Hurricane upon the Sea Islands is an 1898 book by Elisabeth Carpenter Satterthwait about the effects on the local people of the 1893 Sea Islands hurricane which devastated the South Carolina coastal lowlands in late August of that year. The book is noted for its "well-told story," "novelty of theme and locality" and its use of the native dialect of the Gullah islanders of African descent.

Set on Cat Island southeast of Beaufort, South Carolina, Satterthwait's narrative gives a historical fiction account of the storm in pseudo-autobiographical fashion, expressing Satterthwait's Post-Civil War Reconstruction Society of Friends (Quaker) philosophy. She modified her reproduction of the dialogue to support clarity in understanding by readers unfamiliar with the Gullah language. The book been republished twice, in microform in 1970, and by Books for Libraries Press in 1972.

== Personal ==
Satterthwait was a daughter of Robert and Phebe Carpenter of Harrison, Westchester County, New York, where she married in 1884 to Charles E. Satterthwait of Aiken, South Carolina, in a ceremony reported in The Friends' Intelligencer, a Quaker periodical news publication.
