= Catherine "Kate" Carpenter =

- Born: ca. 1730s
- Died: 1784
- Known for: Namesake for Kate's Mountain

Catherine Carpenter, born probably ca. 1730s, died 1784, was a frontier wife and mother for whom Kate's Mountain in Greenbrier County, West Virginia is named.

Kate Carpenter was the wife of Nicholas Carpenter, who built a cabin at the site of White Sulphur Springs in about 1750 and was granted 950 acres there in 1755. In 1756 they were enumerated "In ye lower end of Augusta County" VA. In September 1756, Indians raided the settlements on the Virginia frontier in what was at the time in Augusta County, Virginia. Legends vary, but generally agree that Nicholas and Kate had a very young daughter, Frances Carpenter, who was too young to travel fast enough to escape the attackers, so Kate took her up on the highest mountain near their cabin in hopes of finding refuge while Nicholas went for help from the forts on Jacksons River in present-day Allegheny County, Virginia. He reached Dinwiddie's Fort (also called Byrd's Fort and Warwick's Fort), but was killed in its defense. After the danger subsided, Kate made her way to the settlements on Jacksons River and then to Staunton, Virginia where she decided to remain in safer circumstances. Frances grew up there, and in 1766 married soldier and statesman Captain Michael Bowyer II, a friend of Thomas Jefferson. Frances inherited her father's and mother's land at White Sulphur Springs, which later became the site of the Greenbrier Resort. The mountain on which her mother had taken her for refuge became known as Kate's Mountain, as it is still known today.
