= Kathleen E. Carpenter =

British ecologist

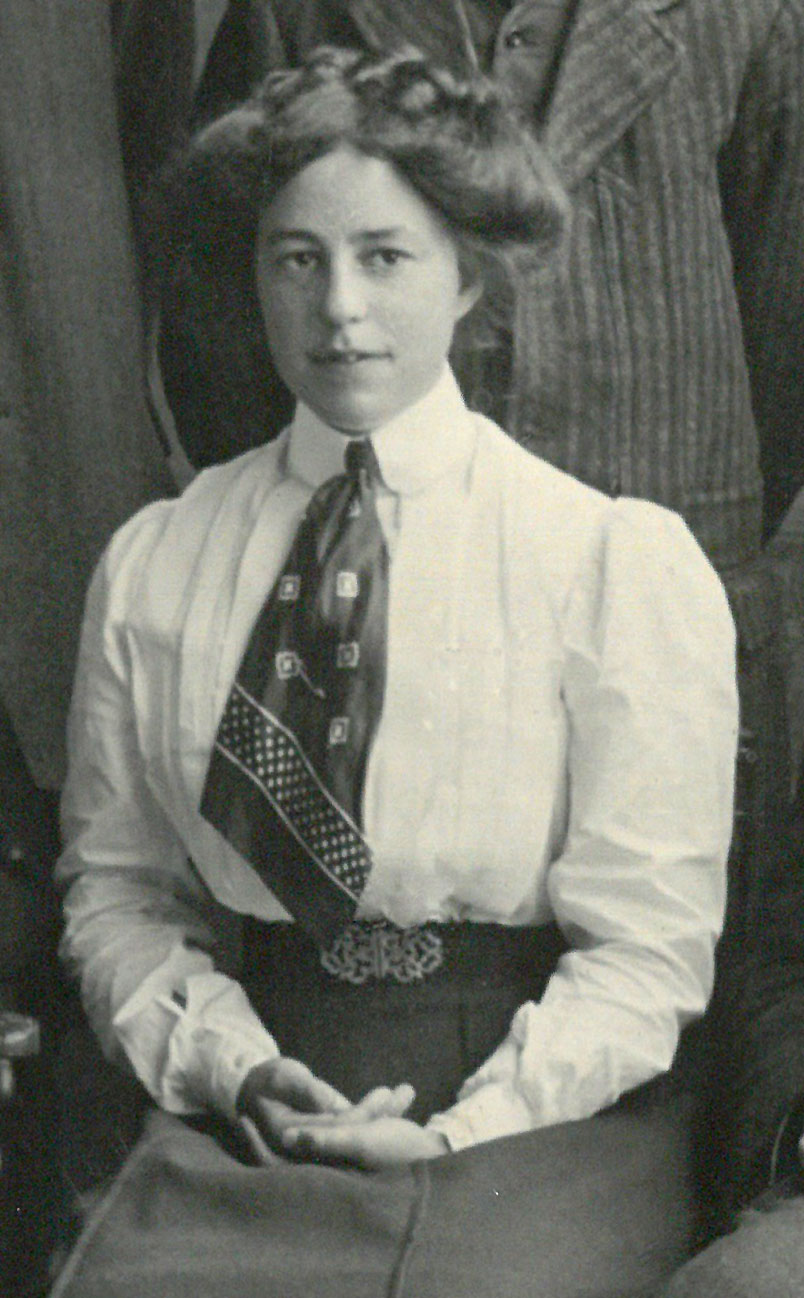
- Kathleen Carpenter circa 1910
- Born: 24 March 1891; Gainsborough, Lincolnshire, England
- Died: 29 May 1970 (aged 79); Cheltenham, Gloucestershire, England
- Education: Aberystwyth University
- Scientific career
- Fields: Freshwater biology
- Workplaces: Aberystwyth University; University of Illinois at Urbana–Champaign; Radcliffe College; McGill University; Washington College; University of Liverpool

Kathleen E. Carpenter (1891–1970) was a British freshwater ecologist. She is best known for her early studies of the effects of metal pollution on Welsh rivers and their biota, as well as her book Life in Inland Waters, the first textbook in English wholly devoted to freshwater ecology.

== Early life ==
She was born Kathleen Edithe Zimmermann on 24 March 1891 in Gainsborough, Lincolnshire, England, one of the four daughters of Francis Frederick Zimmermann and Victoria Boor. Her father was a successful businessman. In 1914 she changed her surname by deed poll to Carpenter (the English translation of the German word Zimmermann).

== Academic career ==
Carpenter was admitted to Aberystwyth University in 1907 to study for a BSc degree, which was awarded by the University of London in 1910. She also received MSc and PhD degrees from Aberystwyth University in the 1920s.

She was commissioned by Julian Huxley to write a textbook about freshwater ecology. Life in Inland Waters (1928) was based on her knowledge and experience. It included almost 100 line drawings that she had made. In the late 1920s she was a researcher in North America at the University of Illinois at Urbana–Champaign and later Radcliffe College and McGill University. She was subsequently a professor at Washington College from 1931 to 1936. She returned to Britain and was a lecturer at the University of Liverpool during World War II. Her research at this time including into the diet of young salmon, including the observation that the eggs were sometimes eaten by the adults.

=== Research ===
Carpenter was one of the first to assess British running water fauna, and her PhD thesis included a "'food relations' diagram" that seems to be one of the first food webs of fresh water animals in the UK. She undertook research into the effects of metal mining on streams in Cardiganshire, collecting samples from distinct habitats within streams. Through studying pristine streams as well as those where mining had recently commenced or finished, she was able to record how the stream's fauna was affected.

== Later life ==
Her academic career appears to have ended during the early 1940s. She died in 1970 while living in Cheltenham.

== Publications ==
- Zimmermann, Kathleen E. (1912). Notes on the Respiratory Mechanism of Corystes Cassivelaunus. Journal of the Marine Biological Association of the United Kingdom, 9(3), 288-291.
- Zimmermann, K. (1913). Habit and Habitat in the Galatheidea: a study in adaptation. Journal of the Marine Biological Association of the United Kingdom, 10(1), 84-101.
- Carpenter, K. E. (1922). The fauna of the Clarach stream (Cardiganshire) and its tributaries. Aberystwyth studies by members of the University College of Wales, 4, 251–258.
- Carpenter, K. (1922). Lead and Animal Life. Nature 110(2764), 543.
- Carpenter, K. (1922). Freshwater Fauna of Aberystwyth Area in Relation to Lead Pollution (Abstract). Journ. Brit. Assoc. (Hull), 373.
- Carpenter, K. E. (1923). Notes on the History of Cardiganshire Lead Mines. Aberystwyth studies by members of the University College of Wales, 5, 99–103.
- Carpenter, K. E. (1923). Distribution of Limnæa pereger and L. truncatula. Nature 112(2801), 9.
- Carpenter, K. E. (1923). The Freshwater Fauna of the Aberystwyth District of Cardiganshire, studied in relation to Lead-Pollution. University College of Wales, Aberystwyth.
- Carpenter, K. E. (1924). A study of the fauna of rivers polluted by lead mining in the Aberystwyth district of Cardiganshire. The Annals of Applied Biology, 9(38), 1–23.
- Carpenter, K. E. (1924). The freshwater fauna of the Aberystwyth district of Cardiganshire, studied with especial reference to the pollution of streams consequent on lead-mining operations. No. 49, File F.G. 1898, Ministry of Agriculture and Fisheries Standing Committee on River Pollution.
- Carpenter, K. (1924). Problems of River Pollution. Nature 113(2837), 385-386.
- Carpenter, K. E. (1925). Biological factors involved in the destruction of river-fisheries by pollution due to lead-mining. Ser. No 84, Rep. No. 77, Ministry of Agriculture and Fisheries Standing Committee on River Pollution.
- Carpenter, K. E. (1925). On the biological factors involved in the destruction of river-fisheries by pollution consequent on lead-mining. Report of the British Association for the Advancement of Science, 1925, p. 403.
- Carpenter, K. E. (1925). On the biological factors involved in the destruction of river-fisheries by pollution due to lead-mining. The Annals of Applied Biology, 12(44), 1–13.
- Carpenter, K. E. (1925). Materials for General Study of Freshwater Fauna, with a detailed survey of a type area. University College of Wales, Aberystwyth.
- Carpenter, K. E. (1926). The lead mine as an active agent in river pollution. Annals of Applied Biology, 13(3), 395–401.
- Carpenter, K. E. (1926). A Planarian species new to Britain. Nature, 117(2946), 556.
- Carpenter, K. E. (1926). Report on the lethal action of lead salts on fishes. Ser. No. 190, Rep. No. 129, Ref. File F.G. 1655. Ministry of Agriculture and Fisheries Standing Committee on River Pollution.
- Carpenter, K. E. (1926). On the Toxicity of Lead-Salts to Fishes. British Association for the Advancement of Science. Report of the Ninety-Fourth Meeting. Oxford 1926, August 4-11, p.368-369.
- Carpenter, K. E. (1927). On a Vexed Question. Fishing Gazette, June 11. 1927.
- Carpenter, K. E. (1927). The lethal action of soluble metallic salts on fishes. Journal of Experimental Biology, 4, 378–390.
- Carpenter, K. E. (1927). Faunistic ecology of some Cardiganshire streams. Journal of Ecology, 15(1), 33–54.
- Carpenter, K. E. (1927). On the Survival of some Ice-age Relics in the Freshwater Fauna of Cardiganshire. Report of the British Association for the Advancement of Science, 1927. p. 336.
- Carpenter, K. E. (1928). Life in Inland Waters, with especial reference to animals. Sidgwick & Jackson Ltd.
- Carpenter, K. E. (1928). On the distribution of freshwater Turbellaria in the Aberystwyth district, with especial reference to two ice-Age relicts. Journal of Ecology, 16(1), 105–122.
- Carpenter, K. E. (1928). On the tropisms of some freshwater planarians. The British Journal of Experimental Biology, 5, 196–203.
- Carpenter, K. E. (1930). Further researches on the action of metallic salts on fishes. Journal of Experimental Zoology, 6, 407–422. †Contributions from the Zoölogical Laboratories of the University of Illinois, no. 376.
- Carpenter, K. E. (1930). Fish life in relation to polluting influences in the Lake Champlain watershed. New York State Dept Conserv Suppl to 19th Ann Rept, pp. 186-209.
- Carpenter, K. E. (1931). Variations in Holopedium Species. Science, 74, 550–551.
- Carpenter, K. E. (1931). Fresh Water Investigations. Annual Report of the work of the Biological Board of Canada for the year 1930, 13-14.
- Carpenter, K. E. (1939). Food of Salmon Parr. Nature, 143, 336.
- Carpenter, K. E. (1940). The feeding of Salmon parr in the Cheshire Dee. Proceedings of the Zoological Society of London, 110, 81–96.

== See also ==
- Timeline of women in science
