= Andrew Carpenter =

Andrew Carpenter may refer to:

- Andrew Carpenter (One Life to Live), One Life to Live character
- Andrew Carpenter (baseball) (born 1985), American baseball pitcher
- Andy Carpenter, character in books by David Rosenfelt
- Andy Carpenter, anglicisation of Andries Carpentière (1672–1737), Dutch or French sculptor active in Britain

== See also ==
- Andrew Carpenter House, in Gaston County, North Carolina
