= Wendi B. Carpenter =

Retired US Navy officer

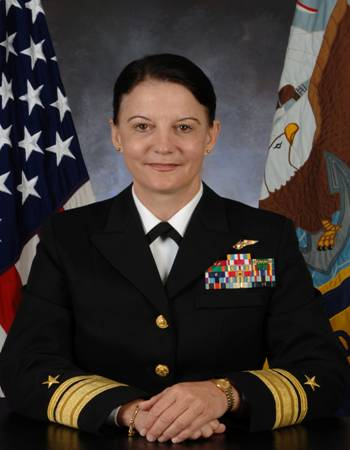
- Rear Admiral (Ret.) Wendi B. Carpenter in her official retirement portrait for the US Navy.
- Born: February 4, 1956 (age 70); New York City, New York, U.S.
- Military career
- Allegiance: United States of America
- Branch: United States Navy
- Service years: 1977-2011
- Rank: Rear Admiral
- Commands: Navy Warfare Development Command
- Awards: Distinguished Service Medal, Defense Superior Service Medal, Legion of Merit (3 awards), Meritorious Service Medal, Navy Commendation Medal (5 awards), Navy Achievement Medal

Rear Admiral Wendi Bryan Carpenter (born February 4, 1956) is a retired United States Navy flag officer and naval aviator. She is also a past president of the State University of New York Maritime College.

== Background ==
Carpenter is the daughter of a U.S. Air Force veteran of World War II, the Korean War and the Vietnam War. Raised throughout the United States, she holds a Bachelor of Science degree from the University of Georgia with a major in psychology. She has pursued graduate studies in Marketing and holds an MA in International Relations from Salve Regina University.

== Career ==
Carpenter received her commission through Aviation Officer Candidate School, NAS Pensacola, Florida, with Class 19-77 and was designated a Naval Aviator in July 1979. Graduating at the top of her class, she was assigned as the Navy's first Selectively Retained Graduate Instructor Pilot (SERGRAD) in the T-44 aircraft at VT-31, NAS Corpus Christi, Texas. Following her tour as an instructor pilot, Rear Admiral Carpenter was ordered to sea duty at VQ-3 (TACAMO), NAS Barbers Point, Hawaii, where she served as a Mission Commander, Aircraft Commander and Instructor Pilot in the EC130F/G/Q aircraft. She deployed throughout the Pacific and the western U.S. and Alaska in support of the nation's strategic nuclear triad. After completing a shore assignment at the Naval Military Personnel Command as an Aviation Junior Officer Assignments Officer, Carpenter left active duty and accepted a reserve commission in February 1985.

Remaining highly active in the operational reserve force, Carpenter's assignments have included the staffs of Commander Carrier Group Four, Commander United States Naval Forces Europe, Commander United States Sixth Fleet, Deputy Chief of Naval Operations (DCNO) Fleet Readiness and Logistics, and Commander United States Second Fleet. Rear Admiral Carpenter has accepted numerous recalls to active duty and has held four Navy reserve commands at the Commander and Captain level: Officer in Charge of VR 506, CINCUSNAVEUR DET 108, DCNO N4 Fleet Readiness and Logistics DET 106, and Second Fleet JFACC. Under her leadership as Commanding Officer of Fleet Readiness and Logistics, the 75 member CNO staff unit shared the FY01 DON CIO Award for "E Business" in government. She has represented the United States in a number of coalition and NATO forums, and completed Senior Courses at the NATO School in Oberammergau, Germany.

Carpenter's Flag assignments include: Deputy Commander of Navy Region Southeast, Jacksonville, Florida from October 2004 - September 2005, acting Director, OPNAV N31 (Information, Plans, Security Division) from April 2005 - May 2005, Vice Director, Standing Joint Forces HQ (SJFHQ), U.S. Joint Forces Command from December 2004 - September 2006, and Deputy Commander, United States Second Fleet from October 2006-June 2008. In June 2008, Carpenter assumed command of Navy Warfare Development Command, Norfolk, VA, where she served until August 19, 2011.

On August 31, 2011, Admiral Carpenter became the 10th president of the State University of New York Maritime College. She is the first woman to serve as president of the college. She stepped down in late 2013.

In January 2019, Admiral Carpenter was named executive director of the Captain Richard Phillips–Lane Kirkland Maritime Trust, a charitable trust the promotes advocacy for the U.S. maritime industry and the Merchant Marine.

== Awards and decorations ==
Carpenter's awards include the Distinguished Service Medal, Defense Superior Service Medal, Legion of Merit (3 awards), Meritorious Service Medal, Navy Commendation Medal (5 awards), Navy Achievement Medal, and several unit awards.

She has successfully accumulated 3,500 military flight hours.

Admiral Carpenter is "the first woman aviator to be promoted to an admiral in the Navy."

Carpenter is a distinguished graduate of the Naval War College and completed the Capstone Military Leadership Program with class 06–02. Additionally, she has completed executive programs at the National Defense University, UNC Chapel Hill, Defense Acquisition University and the Navy Executive Business Course II (EBC II) at Babson College.

== See also ==
- Women in the United States Navy
