= Patricia Carpenter (psychologist) =

American psychologist

Patricia A. Carpenter is a psychologist who, as of 1997, held the Lee and Marge Gregg Professorship of Psychology at Carnegie Mellon University. Carpenter has studied individual variability in working memory, comprehension rates in speed reading, and how brain function during complex cognitive tasks appears in functional magnetic resonance imaging. With Marcel Just, she coauthored The Psychology of Reading and Language Comprehension (1987).

== Education and career ==
Carpenter earned her Ph.D. in 1972 from Stanford University, and on earning her doctorate joined the Carnegie Mellon University faculty.

== Selected publications ==
- Daneman, Meredyth; Carpenter, Patricia A. (August 1980). "Individual differences in working memory and reading". Journal of Verbal Learning and Verbal Behavior. 19 (4): 450–466. doi:10.1016/S0022-5371(80)90312-6.
- Just, Marcel A.; Carpenter, Patricia A. (1992). "A capacity theory of comprehension: Individual differences in working memory". Psychological Review. 99 (1): 122–149. doi:10.1037/0033-295X.99.1.122. ISSN 1939-1471. PMID 1546114. S2CID 2241367.
- Just, Marcel A.; Carpenter, Patricia A. (1980). "A theory of reading: From eye fixations to comprehension". Psychological Review. 87 (4): 329–354. doi:10.1037/0033-295X.87.4.329. ISSN 1939-1471. PMID 7413885.
