= Mary P. Carpenter =

American inventor

- Born: c. 1840; Buffalo
- Died: c. 1905
- Occupation: Inventor

Mary P. Carpenter or Mary P.C. Hooper (c.1840 – c.1905) was an American inventor from Buffalo, New York credited with seventeen patents over her lifetime. She also founded two companies, the "Carpenter Sewing Machine Co." and the "Carpenter Straw Sewing Machine Co.".

== Biography ==
Not much is known about Carpenter's life outside of her prolific inventing career.

According to the 1855 New York census she was living in Buffalo with her parents and six siblings. Her father's occupation was listed as mechanic. In 1870-1872, Carpenter lived in San Francisco, as a teacher. Additionally her two patent applications from 1870 for a sewing machine and a sewing machine mechanism state that she applied for them in San Francisco. In 1872, it appeared she was now living in New York City since her next eight patent applications are from New York. She married George W. Hooper, a physician from Boston in 1879 and her later patents from 1885 onwards can be found under her married name of Mrs. Mary P.C. Cooper.

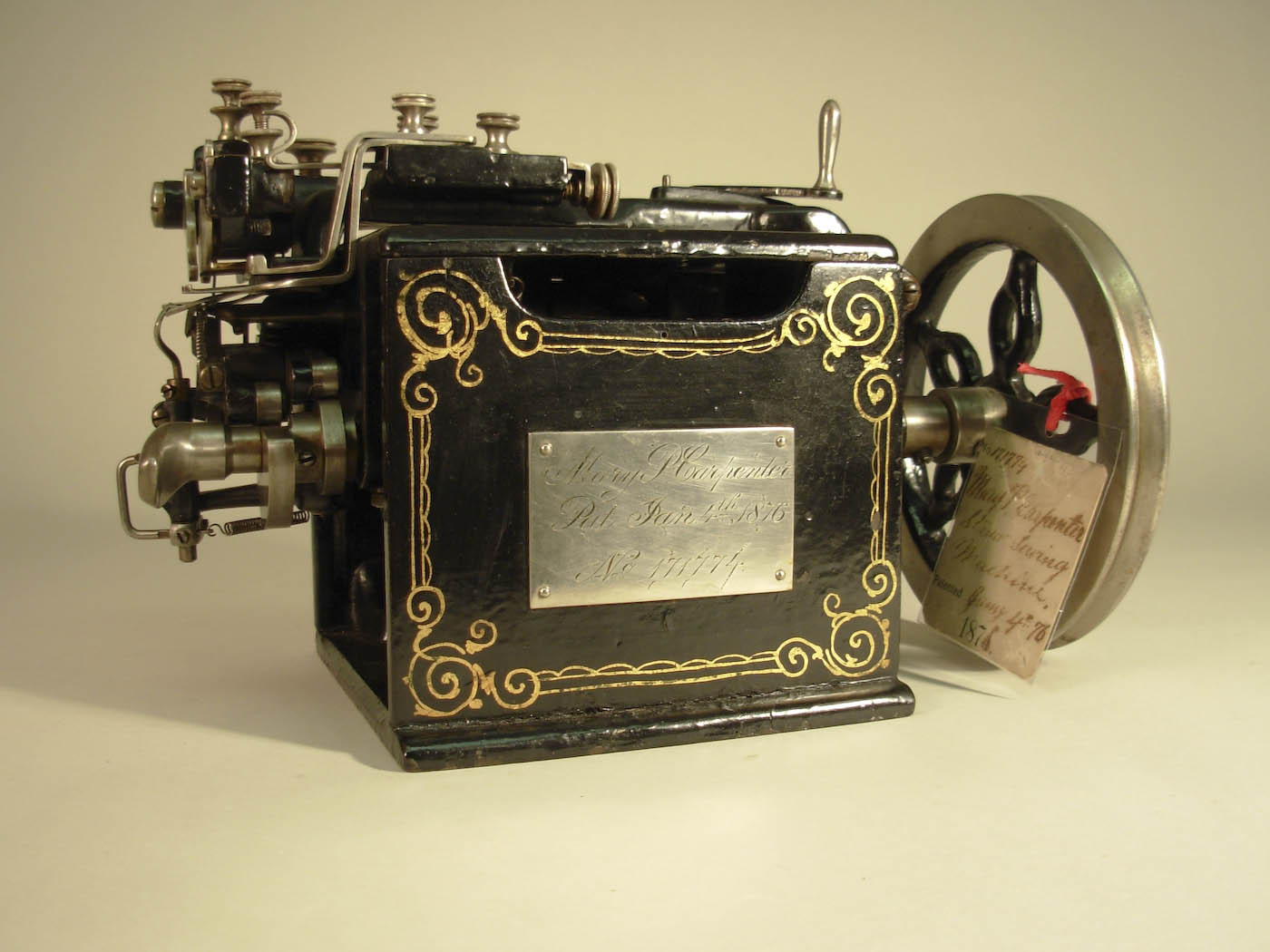
Patent Model-Improvement in Machines for Sewing Straw Braid, 1876, Patent number 171,774, Hagely Museum and Library

== Patents ==
- Her first patent dates from 1862 for improvements to ironing or "fluting" machines, meant to simplify the creation of fluted pleats in clothing that was fashionable at the time.
- In 1866 Carpenter's next patent was for an improved mop-ringer.
- Her third patent was for her first sewing machine improvement in 1870.
- Her next patent dates from 1871 for "a useful Improvement in the Feed-motion of Sewing-Machines".
- Her fifth patent dates from 1872 for "sewing-machines which are especially designed for sewing straw-braid and consists mainly in the construction of the hooked needle employed for drawing the loop through the braid, and also in the mechanism for giving certain peculiar movements to said needle". It is worth noting here that the first US patent filed by a woman was for a cost-improving innovation regarding making women's straw hats, by Mary Dixon Kies, who died before she could profit from her patent. Her original 1809 patent was burned in a fire in 1836, so this 1872 patent is possibly the first patent regarding improvements for straw hat making after that one.
- In 1873, Carpenter received a patent for an improvement for sewing buttons.
- In 1876 Carpenter received a patent for a machine for sewing straw braid. Carpenter's straw-braiding invention led to a patent interference lawsuit where the Carpenter Sewing Machine Co. sued a former employee accusing the employee of stealing her ideas.
- Additionally in 1876 she received a patent for a barrel-painting machine.
- She filed a patent for a coal shovel in 1885. This was her first patent under her married name of Mary P.C. Cooper.
- Carpenter received her tenth patent for a device for numbering houses in 1886.
- She filed and received a patent for a mosquito-net bed canopy in 1887.
- Carpenter was clearly still working on mosquito problems five years later when in 1891, Carpenter was awarded a patent for a mosquito trap.
- She filed a patent for a strong and effective holder for stretching and supporting thin fabrics or material during the operation of embroidering its surface with a stitched pattern, or otherwise ornamenting the same in 1894.
- In 1895 she filed a patent for a device or attachment which will improve the hang of such organ-pipe or goddet skirts, causing them to hang in the desired folds and causing the material to return to the proper folds 'after being disarranged, and by which the folds will be preserved as long as the dress is worn, and which device shall render the use of hair-cloth or similar material heretofore used in such skirts unnecessary, and shall be light, inexpensive, and comfortable and convenient.
- In 1896 Carpenter received two patents, one for a darning holder and one for a darning device.
- Her seventeenth and last patent was for a hair comb in 1904. This last device was to work with a hatpin to better stabilize a woman's hat on her head.

== Collections ==
- Sewing machine, US Patent number 112,016, National Museum of American History, Washington, D.C.
- Sewing machine, straw braid, US Patent number 131,739, National Museum of American History, Washington, D.C.
- Improvement in Machines for Sewing Straw Braid, US Patent number 171,774, Hagley Museum and Library, Wilmington, Delaware.
