= Alfred Carpenter =

Royal Navy admiral & VC recipient (1881-1955)

Vice-Admiral Alfred Carpenter VC
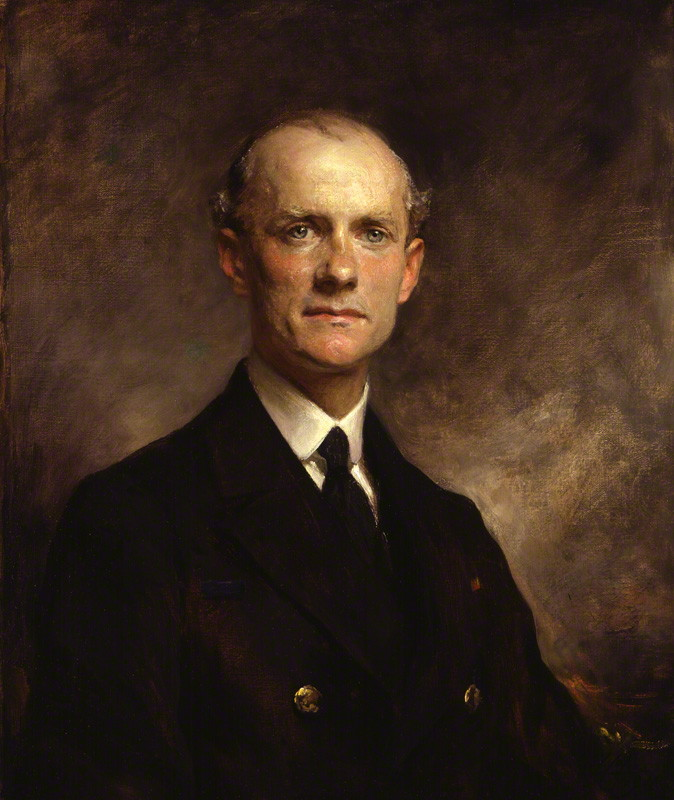
- Born: 17 September 1881; Barnes, Surrey
- Died: 27 December 1955 (aged 74)
- Military career
- Allegiance: United Kingdom
- Branch: Royal Navy
- Service years: 1898 – 1934
- Rank: Vice-Admiral
- Commands: HMS Vindictive
- Conflicts: 1898 Occupation of Crete; Boxer Rebellion; World War I World War II
- Awards: Victoria Cross; Légion d'honneur Croix de Guerre (France)

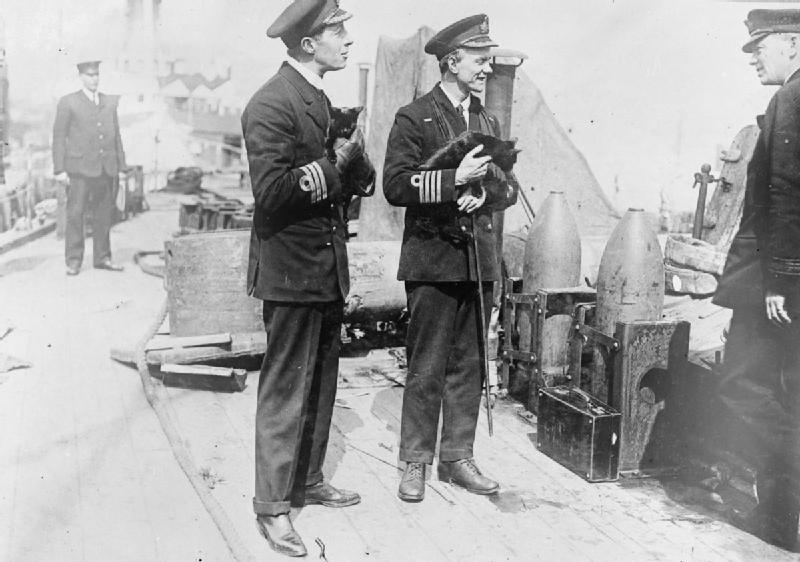
Alfred Carpenter in centre of a group

Vice-Admiral Alfred Francis Blakeney Carpenter, VC (17 September 1881 – 27 December 1955) was a Royal Navy officer who was selected by his fellow officers and men to receive the Victoria Cross, the highest and most prestigious award for gallantry in the face of the enemy that can be awarded to British and Commonwealth forces.

== Family ==
Carpenter was born in Barnes, the son of Henrietta Maud née Shadwell (1858-1889) and Captain Alfred Carpenter RN, and grandson of Commander Charles Carpenter. He attended Bedales School founded by his Uncle Edward Carpenter's close friend John Haden Badley. In 1903 married to Emily Maud Mary Tordiffe (1881-1923) and after her death married Hilda Margaret Allison née Smith (1891-1958) in 1927.

== Career ==
Carpenter joined the Royal Navy and saw naval service as a midshipman in Crete in 1898 and during the Boxer Rebellion of 1900–01. He was acting sub-lieutenant from 15 May 1901. In August 1902 he was temporarily posted to the torpedo boat destroyer HMS Havock for service during the Coronation Fleet review. From late October that year he was posted to the corvette HMS Cleopatra, used as a training cruiser in home waters, and confirmed in the rank of sub-lieutenant. He specialised in navigation from 1903 and received the thanks of the Admiralty for several inventions, and a Humane Society medal for saving life at sea. During World War I he served on Admiral Jellicoe's staff 1914–15. He was promoted to Commander in 1915 and served as navigating officer of HMS Emperor of India 1915–17.

On 22/23 April 1918, Captain Carpenter was in command of HMS Vindictive which was to land a force of 200 Royal Marines on the mole at Zeebrugge at the start of the Zeebrugge Raid. For his conduct during this action he was awarded the VC:

For most conspicuous gallantry.

This officer was in command of "Vindictive." He set a magnificent example to all those under his command by his calm composure when navigating mined waters, bringing his ship alongside the mole in darkness. When "Vindictive" was within a few yards of the mole the enemy started and maintained a heavy fire from batteries, machine guns and rifles on to the bridge. He showed most conspicuous bravery, and did much to encourage similar behaviour on the part of the crew, supervising the landing from the "Vindictive" on to the mole, and walking round the decks directing operations and encouraging the men in the most dangerous and exposed positions. By his encouragement to those under him, his power of command and personal bearing, he undoubtedly contributed greatly to the success of the operation.

Capt. Carpenter was selected by the officers of the "Vindictive," "Iris II.," and "Daffodil," and of the naval assaulting force to receive the Victoria Cross under Rule 13 of the Royal Warrant, dated 29 January 1856.

(Rule 13 of the Royal Warrant provides that after an action in which all are equally brave and distinguished, where no special selection can be made, the officer in overall command may direct that one officer may be selected for the award by the officers and men who took part in the action.)

Carpenter was also made an Officer of the Legion of Honour and awarded the Croix de Guerre with palm. He was sent on a lecturing tour through the US and Canada, 1918–19.

After the war, Carpenter was in command of HMS Carysfort in the Atlantic Fleet 1921–23, Captain of Chatham Dockyard 1924–26, in command of HMS Benbow in 1926 and of HMS Marlborough 1927–28. He was a naval aide-de-camp to the King (an honorary position) in 1929, and promoted rear-admiral and placed on the retired list in the same year. He was promoted to vice-admiral (retired) in 1934. During World War II he commanded the Wye Valley section of the Gloucestershire Home Guard.

His Victoria Cross is displayed at the Imperial War Museum, London, England.

== Publications ==
- The blocking of Zeebrugge, Herbert Jenkins, London, 1925, translated into French as L'embouteillage de Zeebrugge, Payot, Paris, 1924
- De Raid op Zeebrugge door Carl Decaluwé en Tomas Termoteis (gebaseerd op 80 glasplaten van de kapitein van de Vindictive, Captain Alfred Carpenter, die in WO I de aanval op Zeebrugge leidde), ROULARTA MEDIA GROUP, ISBN 9789086794966, 15 April 2015
