= Bobby Carpenter =

Bobby or Bob Carpenter may refer to:

- Bobby Carpenter (ice hockey) (born 1963), former NHL hockey player
- Bobby Carpenter (American football) (born 1983), American football linebacker
- Bob Carpenter (baseball) (1917–2005), Major League Baseball pitcher
- Bob Carpenter (basketball) (1917–1997), American basketball player
- Bob Carpenter (sportscaster) (born 1953), American sportscaster and television play-by-play announcer for Major League Baseball
- R. R. M. Carpenter Jr. (1915–1990), former owner of the Philadelphia Phillies baseball club
- Bob Carpenter (born 1946), member of Nitty Gritty Dirt Band

== See also ==
- Bob Carpenter Center, the basketball and multipurpose arena at the University of Delaware
- Robert Carpenter (disambiguation)
