= Robert Carpenter =

Robert Carpenter may refer to:

== Politicians ==
- Robert C. Carpenter (1924–2011), politician from North Carolina
- Robert Carpenter (American politician) (1909–1979), member of the Ohio House of Representatives
- Robert Carpenter (MP) (died 1607), MP for Rye

== Sports ==
- Robert Carpenter (cricketer) (1830–1901), English cricketer
- Rob Carpenter (running back) (born 1955), American football running back
- Rob Carpenter (wide receiver) (born 1968), American football wide receiver

== Others ==
- R. R. M. Carpenter (Robert Ruliph Morgan Carpenter, Sr., 1877–1949), American executive and member of the board of directors of DuPont
- R. R. M. Carpenter Jr. (Robert Ruliph Morgan Carpenter, Jr., 1915–1990), his son, owner of the Philadelphia Phillies
- Ruly Carpenter (Robert Ruliph Morgan Carpenter III, 1940–2021), son of Robert Jr. and grandson of Robert Sr., owner and team president of the Phillies
- Robert Holt Carpenter (1820–1891), New Zealand bookbinder, politician, bookseller and character

== See also ==
- Bobby Carpenter (disambiguation)
