= John W. Carpenter =

American businessman and agriculturist

- Born: John William Carpenter; August 31, 1881; Corsicana, Texas
- Died: June 16, 1959 (aged 77)
- Occupation: Businessman/Agriculturist
- Spouse: Flossie Belle Gardner
- Children: Ellen Carolyn, Benjamin Howard, John William Jr.
- Parent(s): Thomas Wirt Carpenter, Ellen Isaphene Dickson

John William Carpenter (August 31, 1881 – June 16, 1959) was an American businessman and agriculturist.

== Early life ==
Carpenter was born to Thomas Wirt Carpenter and Ellen Isaphene Dickson in Corsicana, Navarro County, Texas. He was raised on the family's farm, which had been established after the Civil War. After his father's death, he took over the farm, becoming the head-of-household at the early age of 19. He took a job with Corsicana Gas and Electric Company in 1900 to supplement the income of the farm digging trenches and holes for electric and gas lines. He married Flossie Belle Gardner on June 18, 1913. Together, they had three children: Ellen Carolyn, Benjamin Howard, and John William Jr.

His son "Johnny" was killed in an automobile accident when he was a freshman at the University of Texas in 1934. His son's best friend, and cousin was Walter Allen (Al) Dealey Jr. who had lost his father in the previous 12 months. He went to Al and said, "you've lost a father" and "I have lost a son". Let's be "father and son" to each other, and gave him a ring in remembrance of that "replacement commitment" to each other.

== Business years ==
Seven years after starting work, he climbed to the position of president and general manager of Corsicana Gas and Electric Company. He held the same title for Corsicana Transit Company and the Athens Power and Light Company. He moved to Dallas in 1918 and served as president and general manager of Dallas Power and Light Company. In 1919, he went on to become vice-president and general manager of Texas Power and Light Company; he served as president of the same company from 1927 to 1949. He retired in 1953 as the chairman of the executive committee and director.

Carpenter organized the Texas Security Life Insurance Company in 1930. The company became Southland Life Insurance Company through a series of mergers and acquisitions in 1945, making it the fifteenth largest publicly owned company in the United States in 1959.

He was the founder and first president of Lone Star Steel Company in 1942.

== Contributions to Texas development ==
Carpenter operated the largest family of dairy farms in North Texas, which played an important factor in the success of the Texas Centennial Exposition in 1936 and the success of the State Fair of Texas. He served as president of Trinity Valley Cattle Company from 1940 to 1946.

Along with Amon Carter, his friend from Fort Worth, he planted around two million pine seedlings on his farms, and upheld the support for the Trinity River, despite constant floods and droughts that had been common in the past. Carpenter served on the Trinity River Development Committee of the Dallas Chamber of Commerce and president of the Trinity Improvement Association from its beginnings in 1928. He was a major supporter in the introduction of legislation that formed the Trinity River Authority. He also served as member of the committee that introduced Texas's first national park, Big Bend National Park, and later director of the Big Bend National Park Association and the Big Bend Trail Association.

== Education ==
Carpenter was one of the founders of the Texas Technological College (now Texas Tech University) in Lubbock, Texas and a member of the Board of Directors of Texas Technological College. Carpenter was also a member of the board of trustees for Baylor College (now Baylor University). He also served on the Bureau of Business Research for the University of Texas at Austin.

He held a commission as Major in the U.S. Army Officers Reserve Corps and received an honorary LL.D. from Texas Tech University and a D.Eng. from Southern Methodist University.

== Death ==
Carpenter died on the afternoon of June 16, 1959, from a heart attack.

Portions of State Highway 114 and State Highway 183 are named in his honor (John W. Carpenter Freeway).
