= Louis Carpenter (judge) =

American judge

- Born: 14 December 1829; New York, U.S.
- Died: 21 August 1863 (aged 33); Lawrence, Douglas County, Kansas
- Cause of death: Murdered in the Lawrence Massacre
- Years active: 1850–1863
- Known for: Lawyer, Judge

Louis Carpenter (1829, New York – 1863, Kansas) was a judge in Douglas County, Kansas and was the highest ranking civic member of the town of Lawrence to be murdered by Quantrill's Raiders during the Lawrence Massacre.

== Douglas County Kansas ==
Louis Carpenter was a lawyer, and was a deputy clerk of Douglas County, Kansas by June 14, 1859. In late 1860 or early 1861, he became probate judge of Douglas County, the first case bearing his name as judge being recorded on February 26, 1861, and on September 29, 1862, he was chosen by the Union Party as their candidate for the office of Attorney General of Kansas. He was enumerated in the 1860 federal census of the Kansas Territory as age 29, born in the state of New York.

== Lawrence Massacre ==
Carpenter was one of the 185 to 200 men and boys killed in the Lawrence Massacre on August 21, 1863. He was murdered in his home at 943 New Hampshire Street in Lawrence by members of Quantrill’s Raiders. A detailed account of Carpenter's life and murder in Kansas, and a photograph of him, are posted at the Douglas County Law Library website.

== Personal ==
Louis Carpenter was born December 14, 1829, in New York state. His parentage is currently unknown as well as most of his life before coming to Kansas.

Louis married on October 10, 1862, at the home of his bride’s sister and brother-in-law Abigail (Barber) and Grosvenor C. Morse at Emporia, Kansas to Mary E. Barber, who was born ca. 1838 in Massachusetts according to census records. In 1870, his widow was enumerated at Topeka, Kansas; she married second on January 5, 1871, at Emporia, Kansas to John C. Rankin, and was enumerated in Osage County, Kansas in 1900 and 1910. She was a sister of Harriet A. Barber, who never married, and Abigail Barber, who married Grosvenor C. Morse.
