= Edmund Carpenter =

Edmund Carpenter may refer to:

- Edmund N. Carpenter (1865–1952), member of the U.S. House of Representatives from Pennsylvania
- Edmund N. Carpenter II (1921–2008), American lawyer
- Edmund Snow Carpenter (1922–2011), American anthropologist

== See also ==
- Ed Carpenter (disambiguation)
- Edward Carpenter (disambiguation)
