= Lewin's Mead =

Area of Bristol, England

Coordinates: 51.4573°N 2.5924°W

- Location within Bristol
- Unitary authority: Bristol
- Region: South West
- Country: England
- Sovereign state: United Kingdom
- Post town: BRISTOL
- Postcode district: BS1
- Dialling code: 0117
- Police: Avon and Somerset
- Fire: Avon
- Ambulance: South Western
- UK Parliament: Bristol West

Lewin's Mead is an area of Bristol, England, part of the city ward of Cabot, in the historic centre of the city, lying just outside the former medieval town walls. Several old buildings survive, including the Unitarian Chapel constructed in the late 18th century, an old sugar house and the ancient thoroughfare known as Christmas Steps. The 13th century St Bartholomew's Hospital which became Bristol Grammar School in the 16th century is situated at the bottom of Christmas Steps.

== Etymology ==
The name of the area, Lewin's Mead, means Lewin's Meadow. It is derived from the Old English word mǣd, meaning meadow, which indicates that this was originally grassland adjacent to the river Frome. The name Lewin is derived from the Old English Leofwine which is one of the few Old English names that have survived the Norman Conquest.

== History ==
The area was situated outside the medieval city walls and was partly occupied by the estate of St Bartholomew's Hospital and also by Greyfriars, Bristol. Following the Dissolution of the Monasteries in the sixteenth century, townhouses were built in the area and the buildings of St Bartholomew's Hospital became the home of Bristol Grammar School, where it remained until the late eighteenth century. In the late seventeenth century a Presbyterian Chapel, was established and then destroyed by a mob led by the attorney John Hellier, following the passage of the Conventicles Act 1670, which forbade nonconformist religious worship.

A sugar refinery was constructed in the eighteenth century to process molasses brought to Bristol as part of the Atlantic slave trade. The Three Sugar Loaves pub at the bottom of Christmas Steps provides a reminder of this. In May 1755, London Morning Penny Post reported that thefts from the sugar house were so frequent that guards armed with cutlasses had been placed on it. The most recent theft had been of 100 pounds (45 kg) of sugar, valued at 25 shillings.

In the eighteenth century a Unitarian chapel, the Lewin's Mead Unitarian meeting house, designed by William Blackburn, was built adjacent to the sugar refinery. At this time the state of the roads was poor. A report in Felix Farley's Bristol Journal in 1783 noted that the city jurors, responsible amongst other things for surveying the streets, reported that "the East end of Lewin's Mead, leading to Silver Street in the parish of St. James, is full of large, deep and dangerous Holes, which the Jurors find is occasioned by two old and rotten Houses, which they are informed have no Owners to pay for repairing the Street in Front of them." In the nineteenth century Lewin's Mead, at that time regarded as a slum, became the site for the first ragged school founded by Mary Carpenter, who was the daughter of the minister of the Unitarian Chapel, Lant Carpenter.

== Today ==
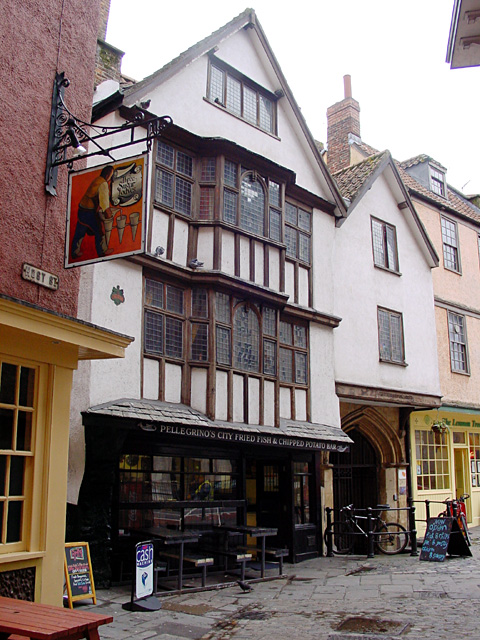
A thirteenth-century building in Lewin's Mead, Bristol, now a cake shop.

The area is now dominated by residential apartment buildings and tall office blocks and is split by busy main roads. Some of the damage done by 1970s and 1980s development may now be ameliorated under a scheme being considered by Bristol City Council. Some of the tower blocks have now been decorated with graffiti. as Lewin's Mead regenerates.
