= Philip Herbert Carpenter =

British naturalist (1852–1891)

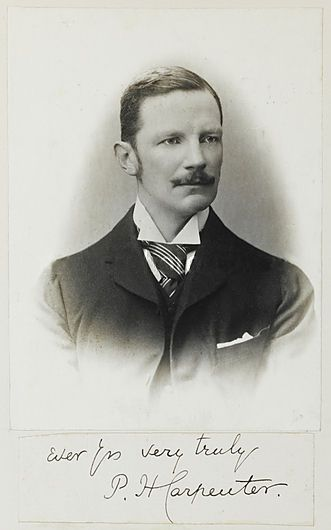
- Born: 6 February 1852; London, England
- Died: 21 October 1891 (aged 39); Eton College, England
- Resting place: 51.567°N 0.147°E
- Education: University College London; Trinity College, Cambridge
- Occupations: naturalist and crinoid authority
- Years active: 1874–1891
- Title: Master of Arts – MSc(1868); Doctor of Science(1874); Fellow of the Royal Society – FRS(1885)
- Parent(s): William Benjamin Carpenter, Louisa Powell (1840–1885)
- Relatives: Philip Pearsall Carpenter (uncle)); Russell Lant Carpenter (uncle); Mary Carpenter (Aunt)
- Awards: Lyell Fund (1881)

Philip Herbert Carpenter (6 February 1852 – 21 October 1891), FRS, British naturalist and crinoid authority, was the fourth son of William Benjamin Carpenter.

== Education and research ==
Carpenter was educated at University College School, then at University College, and afterwards became a Scholar of Trinity College, Cambridge, where he graduated in 1874. He was a member of the scientific staff of the deep-sea exploring expeditions of H.M.S. Lightning (1868) and Porcupine (1869–1870). In 1875, he was appointed assistant naturalist to H.M.S. Valorous accompanying Admiral Sir George Strong Nares's Arctic expedition to Disko Island, and spent the summer sounding and dredging in Davis Strait and the North Atlantic.

== Career ==
After the 1872–1876 HMS Challenger expedition had returned, he was asked in January 1878 by Sir Wyville Thomson to describe the free-swimming Crinoids that had been collected.

Carpenter was an expert on the morphology of the echinoderms, especially the crinoids, both contemporary and fossil. In 1883, he was awarded the Lyell Fund by the Geological Society of London in recognition of the scientific value of his work, and in 1885 was elected a Fellow of the Royal Society.

== Publications ==
Carpenter published a large number of papers on Echinoderm and especially Crinoid morphology, in the Royal, Linnean, Geological, and Zoological Societies of London, the Quarterly Journal of Microscopical Science, the Annals and Magazine of Natural History, Zoologischer Anzeiger, and many other journals. He jointly authored the Catalogue of the Blastoidea in the British Museum with Mr. R. Etheridge, jun.

- 1882. On the Relations of Hybocrinus, Baerocrinus, and Hybocystites, Quart. Journ. Geol. Soc. vol. xxxviii. (No. 151), pp. 298–312, pi. xi.
- 1886. Note on the Structure of Crotalocrinus, Ann. Mag. Nat. Hist. ser. 5, vol. xviii. pp. 397–406.
- 1887. Notes on Echinoderm Morphology, No. 11; on the Development of the Apical Plates in Amphiura squamata, Quart. Journ. Micr. Sci. vol. xxviii. pp. 303–317.
- 1889. Report on the Comatulae of the Mergui Archipelago, etc., Journ. Linn. Soc. London (Zool.), vol. xxi. pp. 304–316, pis. xxvi. and xxvii.
- 1890. Preliminary Report on the Crinoidea obtained in the Port Phillip Biological Survey, Proc. Roy. Soc. Victoria, new series, vol. ii. pp. 135–136.
- 1890. On certain points in the Anatomical Nomenclature of Echinoderms, Ann. Mag. Nat. Hist. ser. 6, vol. vi. pp. 1–23.
- 1891. Some publications on American Carboniferous Echinoderms, Ann. Mag. Nat. Hist. ser. 6, vol. viii. pp. 94–100.
- 1891. On certain points in the Morphology of the Cystidea, Journ. Linn. Soc. London (Zool.), vol. xxiv. pp. 1–52, pi. i. Abstract in Rep. Brit. Assoc. for 1890, p. 821; and in GEOL. MAG. Dec. III. Vol. VIH. p. 135, March 1891.
- 1891. Notes on some Arctic Comatulae, Journ. Linn. Soc. London (Zool.), vol. xxiv. pp. 53–63, pi. ii.
- 1891. Notes on some Crinoids from the Neighbourhood of Madeira, op. et torn. tit. pp. 64–69.

He also contributed an account of the Echinoderms to Cassell's Natural History (1883), and was the chief contributor for the section on the same group in Nicholson and Lydekker's A Manual of Palaeontology (1889).

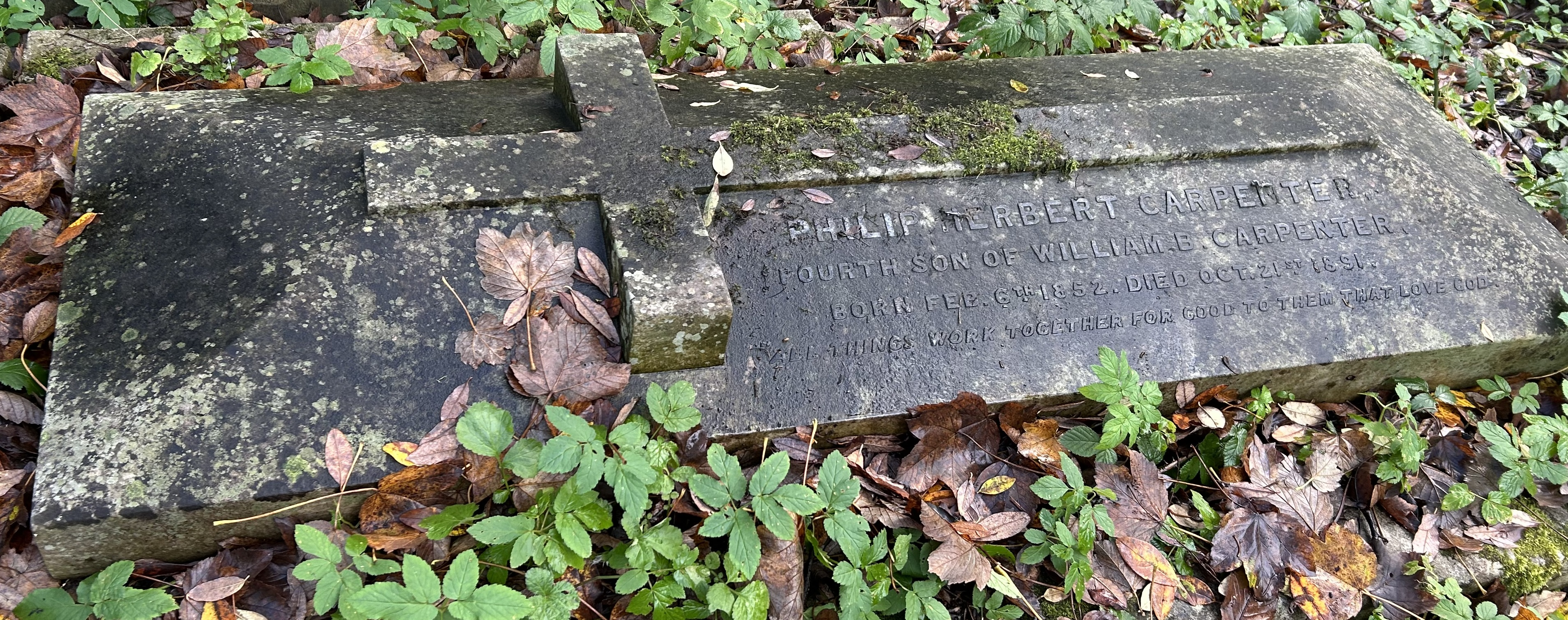
Grave of Philip Herbert Carpenter in Highgate Cemetery

== Personal life ==
On 19 April 1879, he married Caroline Emma Hale, daughter of Edward Hale, an assistant master at Eton, by whom he had five sons. Carpenter died at Eton College where he was Science Master in 1891 after self-administrating chloroform during a bout of temporary insanity caused by chronic insomnia. He is buried on the western side of Highgate Cemetery close to other members of the Carpenter family.
