= Estlin Carpenter =

British theologian and academic (1844–1927)

Joseph Estlin Carpenter
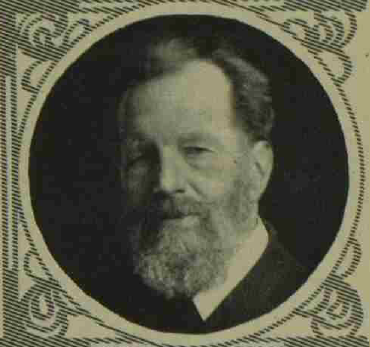
- Born: 5 October 1844; Ripley, Surrey
- Died: 2 June 1927 (aged 82)
- Occupations: Unitarian minister, writer

Joseph Estlin Carpenter (5 October 1844 – 2 June 1927) was an English Unitarian minister, the Principal and then President of Manchester College, Oxford. He was an expert in Sanskrit and a pioneer in the study of comparative religion.

== Biography ==
Carpenter was born in Ripley, Surrey. He was the second son of William Benjamin Carpenter. His grandfather was Unitarian minister Lant Carpenter.

Carpenter was educated at University College School, London, and the University of London, where he read mental and moral philosophy. He was minister of Oakfield Road Church in Clifton (1866–1869) and Mill Hill Chapel in Leeds (1869–1875).

He was described in the Encyclopedia Americana as an important "Sanskrit scholar and Biblical critic". He was Professor of ecclesiastical history at Manchester College, Oxford.

He wrote a biography of his aunt Mary Carpenter, the prolific social reformer and educationalist. In his book The Historical Jesus and the Theological Christ (1911) he defended the historicity of Jesus and criticized the claims of Christ myth theory proponents such as Arthur Drews. Congregationalist Reginald John Campbell wrote that the book contains a "temperate and scholarly criticism of the Christ Myth theories."

In 1878, he married Alice Mary Buckton (1854–1931); the couple had no children.

== Selected publications ==
- The Life and Work of Mary Carpenter (London: Macmillan & Co, 1879)
- Life in Palestine When Jesus Lived: A Short Hand-Book to the Synoptical Gospels (London: Sunday School Association, 1884)
- Outlines of the History of Religion (London, 1888) [translator]
- The First Three Gospels: Their Origins and Relations. (London: Sunday School Association, 1890)
- The Bible in the Nineteenth Century (1903)
- James Martineau, Theologian and Teacher: A Study of His Life and Thought. (London: Philip Green, 1905)
- Comparative Religion, (London: Williams and Norgate. Home University Library of Modern Knowledge, 1910)
- The Historical Jesus and the Theological Christ (London, 1911)
- Theism in Medieval India: Lectures Delivered in Essex Hall, London October–December, 1919 (London: Williams and Norgate, 1921)
