= Barling (surname) =

Barling is a surname. Notable people with the surname include:

- Bert Barling (1878–1952), Australian rules footballer
- Gerald Barling (born 1949), English judge
- Gilbert Barling (1855–1940), English surgeon
- John Barling (1804–1883), English dissenting minister
- Kurt Barling (born 1961), British journalist
- Ron Barling (1912–2001), Australian rules footballer
- Tim Barling (born 1965), Australian rules footballer
- Tom Barling (1906–1993), English cricketer
