= Barling =

Barling could refer to one of the following places:

- Barling, Essex, England
- Barling, Arkansas, United States
- Barlings, Lincolnshire, England

== Other uses ==
- Barling (surname)
