= Fullerian Professor of Physiology =

Professorship at the Royal Institution, London

The Fullerian Chairs at the Royal Institution in London, England, were established by John 'Mad Jack' Fuller.

== Fullerian Professors of Physiology & Comparative Anatomy ==
- 1834–1837 Peter Mark Roget
- 1837–1838 Robert Edmond Grant
- 1841–1844 Thomas Rymer Jones
- 1844–1848 William Benjamin Carpenter
- 1848–1851 William W. Gull
- 1851–1855 Thomas Wharton Jones
- 1855–1858 Thomas Henry Huxley
- 1858–1862 Richard Owen
- 1862–1865 John Marshall
- 1865–1869 Thomas Henry Huxley
- 1869–1872 Michael Foster
- 1872–1875 William Rutherford
- 1875–1878 Alfred Henry Garrod
- 1878–1881 Edward Albert Sharpey-Schafer
- 1881–1884 John Gray McKendrick
- 1884–1886 Arthur Gamgee
- 1887 (vacant)
- 1888–1891 George John Romanes
- 1891–1894 Victor Horsley
- 1894–1897 Charles Stewart
- 1897–1898 Augustus Desiré Waller
- 1898–1901 Ray Lankester
- 1901–1904 Allan Macfadyen
- 1904–1906 Louis Compton Miall
- 1906–1909 William Stirling
- 1909–1912 Frederick Walker Mott
- 1912–1915 William Bateson
- 1915–1918 Charles Scott Sherrington
- 1918–1924 Arthur Keith
- 1924–1927 Joseph Barcroft
- 1927–1930 Julian Sorell Huxley
- 1930–1933 John Burdon Sanderson Haldane
- 1933–1935 Grafton Elliot Smith
- 1935–1937 Edward Mellanby
- 1937–1941 Frederick Keeble
- 1941–1944 Jack Cecil Drummond
- 1944–1947 James Gray
- 1947–1953 Edward James Salisbury
- 1953–1957 Harold Munro Fox
- 1957–1961 John Zachary Young
- 1961–1967 Richard John Harrison
- 1967–1973 Andrew Fielding Huxley
- 1973–1979 Max Ferdinand Perutz
- 1979–1985 David Chilton Phillips
- 1985–1991 John Bertrand Gurdon
- 1991–1999 Anne McLaren
- 1999–2009 Susan Greenfield

== Bibliography ==
- "Fullerian Professors of Physiology and Comparative Anatomy". The Royal Institution of Great Britain. 2012.
