= Robert Edmond Grant =

British anatomist and zoologist

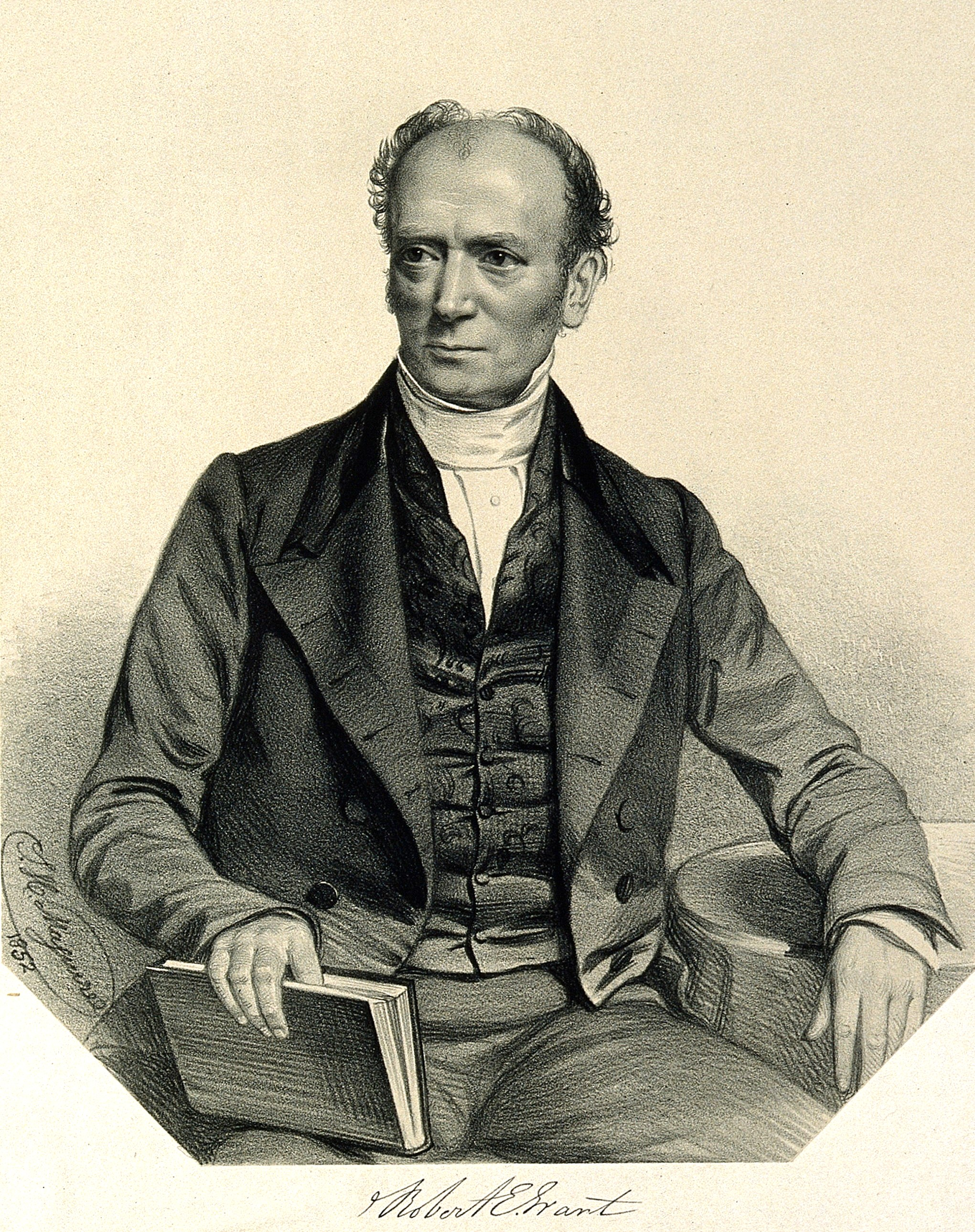
Grant in 1852 aged 59

Robert Edmond Grant MD FRCPEd FRS FRSE FZS FGS (11 November 1793 – 23 August 1874) was a British anatomist and zoologist.

== Life ==
Grant was born at Argyll Square in Edinburgh (demolished to create Chambers Street), the son of Alexander Grant WS, and his wife, Jane Edmond. He was educated at the High School in Edinburgh then studied medicine at Edinburgh University. Having obtained his MD at Edinburgh in 1814, Grant gave up medical practice in favour of marine biology and the zoology of invertebrates, living on a legacy from his father. As a materialist and freethinker, and politically radical, he was open to ideas in biology that were considered subversive in the climate of opinion prevailing in Britain after the Napoleonic Wars. He cited Erasmus Darwin's Zoönomia in his doctoral dissertation, a work which introduced the idea of evolution in poetical form.

In 1824 he was elected a Fellow of the Royal Society of Edinburgh his proposer being Dr John Barclay.

He became one of the foremost naturalists of the early 19th century at Edinburgh and subsequently the first professor of comparative anatomy at University College London. He is noted for his influence on the young Charles Darwin and his espousal of Geoffroy's ideas on evolution.

Grant held the UCL chair of comparative anatomy for life (1827–1874); he was elected FRS in 1836; he became Fullerian professor of Physiology at the Royal Institution 1837–8, and in 1847 Dean of the UCL Medical Faculty. In 1853 he became Swiney lecturer in geology to the British Museum.

== Career ==
=== Edinburgh and travel ===
Grant travelled widely, visiting universities in France, Germany, Italy and Switzerland. He came into contact with the French zoologist Étienne Geoffroy Saint-Hilaire who promulgated a view on evolution similar to that of Jean-Baptiste Lamarck's.

Grant studied marine life around the Firth of Forth, collecting specimens around the shores near a house he took at Prestonpans as well as from fishing boats, and becoming an expert on the biology of sponges and sea-slugs. He considered that the same laws of life affected all organisms, from monad to man (in this context monad means a hypothetical primitive living organism or unit of organic life). Following Geoffroy, Grant arranged life into a chain, or an escalator, which was kept moving upwards by the appearance of spontaneously emerging monads at its base.

In 1824 Grant gave lectures on invertebrates, covering their comparative anatomy; these were in place of John Barclay. He was also elected a fellow of the Royal Society of Edinburgh.

=== Darwin as disciple ===
Grant was a stalwart of the Plinian Society for student naturalists, which Charles Darwin joined in the autumn of 1826 on starting his second year of medical studies at Edinburgh University. Darwin became Grant's keenest student and assisted him with collecting specimens.

During that winter and spring Grant published twenty papers in Edinburgh journals, mostly on sponges, eggs and larvae, which won him an international reputation, with the papers being translated into French. Grant took Darwin as a guest to the Wernerian society which was held in Robert Jameson's room, with membership restricted to MDs; there Darwin saw a demonstration by John James Audubon. On 24 March 1827 Grant announced to the society that black spores often found in oyster shells were the eggs of a skate leech, and published a paper on this discovery. This discovery was in fact Darwin's and Darwin lost interest in Grant as a mentor after this event. Darwin himself made a presentation on 27 March announcing this and his observations on sea-slug larvae to the Plinian Society.

Darwin contributed to Grant's investigations into the 'unity of plan' of animals which culminated with Grant's announcement to the Wernerian Society that he had identified the pancreas in molluscs, demonstrated with a pinned-out sea-slug. This showed a homology between these simple creatures and mammals, tying them into his controversial chain of life.

=== University College London ===
Grant then became Professor of Comparative Anatomy at University College London, a post he held from 1827 until his death in 1874. Grant's pay was £39 per annum. He was involved in radical and democratic causes, campaigning for a new Zoological Society museum run professionally rather than by aristocratic amateurs; and tried to turn the British Museum into a research institution run along French lines. He was opposed by Tories who attacked him for supporting "the reptile press" and its "blasphemous derision of the sacred truths of Christianity" and succeeded in getting him voted out of a post at the Zoological Society of London. Richard Owen, vehemently opposed to Grant's evolution theory, succeeded in supplanting him.

Darwin visited Grant in 1831 to get advice on storing specimens immediately before setting out on the Voyage of the Beagle. When Darwin returned from his voyage, Grant was one of those to offer to examine his specimens, but was turned down: they do not seem to have had further contact.

== Views ==
On his frequent trips to the continent Grant became close friends with Geoffroy, a leading French comparative anatomist. The Edinburgh extramural medical schools were fertile ground for Geoffroy's ideas, and Scottish radicals became Geoffroyan disciples. These included William A. F. Browne, a phrenologist who later turned his energies to asylum reform and neurological psychiatry. Grant took these ideas to London, where he introduced homology (the basic Geoffroyan technique) to his UCL students. He also advanced Lamarck and de Blainville, whose ideas were of similar vein, and included ideas of recapitulation theory.

=== Background on Geoffroy ===
Geoffroy was a deist, and his theory was not a theory of common descent, but a working-out of existing potential in a given type. For him, the environment causes a direct induction of organic change. This opinion Ernst Mayr labels as 'Geoffroyism'. It is definitely not what Lamarck believed (for Lamarck, a change in habits is what changes the animal). Lawrence had argued in 1816 that the climate does not directly cause the differences between human races.

Geoffroy's comparative anatomy featured the comparison of the same organ or group of bones through a range of animals. He argued (1818–22) for the 'unity of composition' of all vertebrates. One of his major discoveries was the homology of the opercular plates of the gill cover of fishes with the inner ear ossicles of mammals. Geoffroy's methods worked well for vertebrates, but when he compared vertebrates to invertebrates by turning invertebrates upside down and partly inside out – "every animal is either inside or outside its vertebral column" – he met his nemesis. The Geoffroy-Cuvier debate in Paris before the Académie des Sciences (15 February 1830) saw Georges Cuvier demolish his claim that the four Cuvierian branches of the animal kingdom could be reduced to one. The relation between the ideas of Geoffroy and Cuvier can be expressed thus: whereas with Cuvier structure determines function, with Geoffroy function determines structure. The issue between them, however, was religious, political and social as well as scientific.

=== Grant's programme ===
Grant first went public on the subject of evolution in 1826. Here he speculated that 'transformation' might affect all organisms. He noted that successive strata seemed to show a progressive, natural succession of fossil animals. These forms "have evolved from a primitive model" by "external circumstances": this is a clear Lamarckian statement. Also, Grant accepted a common origin for plants and animals, and the basic units of life ('monads'), he proposed, were spontaneously generated. This is both reductionism and materialism. The programme went further than either Geoffroy or Lamarck, but was not a complete theory of evolution.

=== Radicalism and Wakley ===
Grant was a 'progressive' in both social and scientific terms. He was widely and probably correctly regarded as a materialist or atheist: there was no place for the supernatural in his account of biology. He was a supporter of Thomas Wakley, The Lancet and the BMA, all of whom were anti-establishment in their day. The main idea of the radical reformers was that government should take over or at least oversee the licensing powers of the medical corporations.

When Grant came to London he was not eligible to become a Fellow of the Royal College of Physicians of London (RCP) because he was not a graduate of Oxford or Cambridge. Others who wished to practice in England had to take a licence from the RCP or acquire an apothecary's qualification. Grant refused to take out a London licence from the RCP, and so cut himself off from a lucrative source of income. He campaigned all his life for reform to both the RCP and the Royal College of Surgeons of London.

Wakley responded to Grant's support for the Lancet and its radical programme with fulsome praise of Grant, and printed the text of all 60 lectures of Grant's comparative anatomy course in the Lancet for 1833–4. Reviewers agreed that Grant's course was the first 'comprehensive and accessible' exposition of philosophical anatomy in English.

== Death and legacy ==
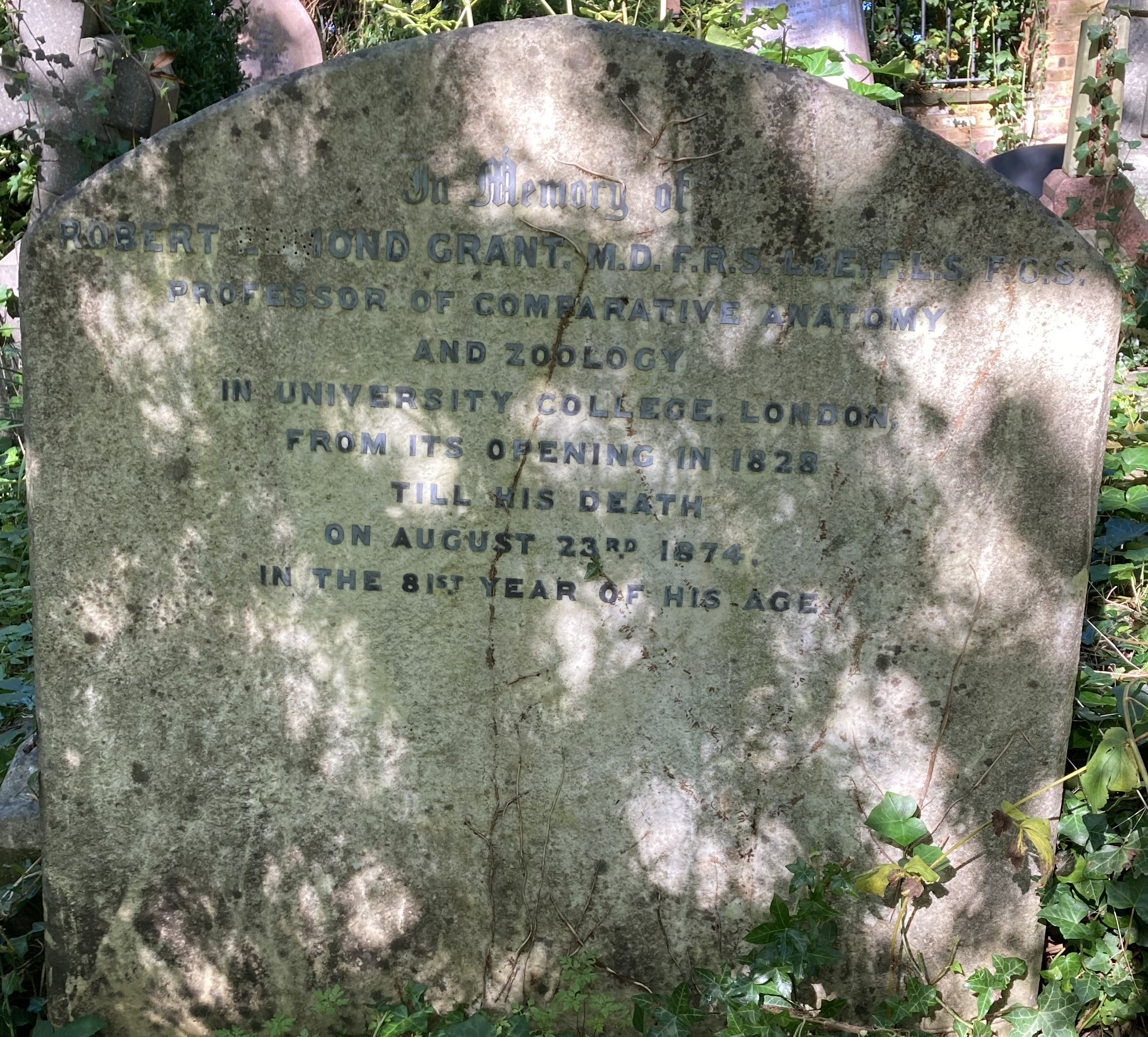
Grave of Robert Edmond Grant in Highgate Cemetery

Grant died at home at 2 Euston Grove, Euston Square, London, still occupying the chair at UCL. In his will he bequeathed his estate, of less than £1,500, to UCL. He was buried on the eastern side of Highgate Cemetery.

The second half of Grant's long professional life was not successful, and his style of teaching zoology was swept aside by T. H. Huxley's disciple E. Ray Lankester, in the new Jodrell Chair of Zoology and Comparative Anatomy. Lankester did, however, retain, reorganise and expand the college zoology museum, now known as the Grant Museum of Zoology at UCL.

Robert Edmond Grant is commemorated in the scientific name of a species of African snake, Gonionotophis grantii.

== Collections ==
University College London holds a volume of notes taken by a student attending Grant's comparative anatomy lectures in 1930.

== Notes ==
Academic offices
Preceded by Peter Mark Roget	Fullerian Professor of Physiology; 1837–1838	Succeeded by Thomas Rymer Jones
