= St Bartholomew's Hospital, Bristol =

Hospital building in Bristol, England

St Bartholomew's Hospital
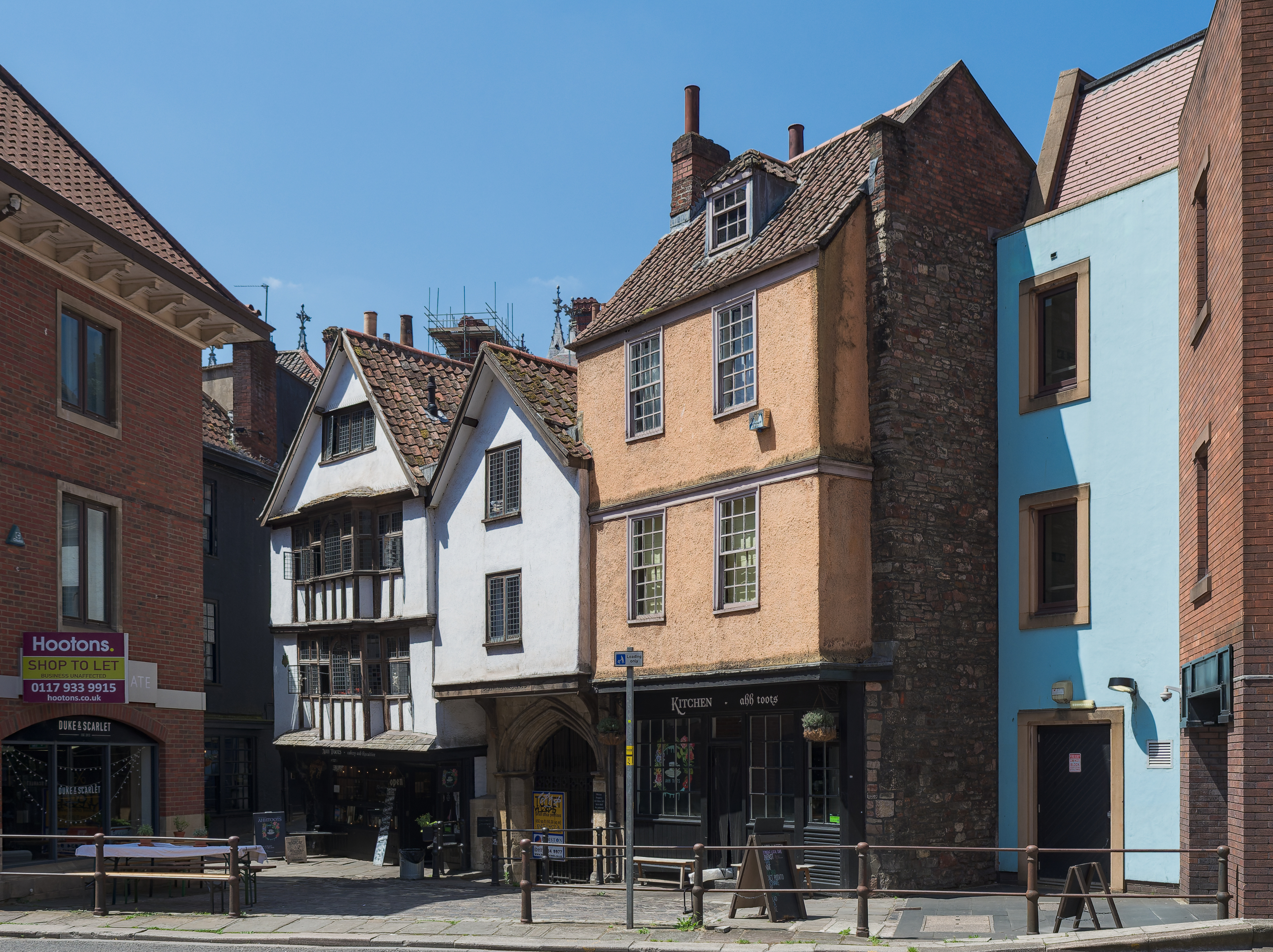

- Location within Bristol

General information
- Location: Bristol, England
- Coordinates: 51.455810°N 2.596512°W
- Construction started: 12th century

St Bartholomew's Hospital is the site of a medieval monastery hospital at the bottom of Christmas Steps, in Lewin's Mead, Bristol, England. It has been designated as a grade II listed building.

The building incorporates an arcade of arches from a 12th-century town house. The round piers predate the hospital, and may come from an aisled hall, the earliest remains of domestic architecture in the city, which was then adapted to form the hospital chapel. It was incorporated into a monastery hospital, similar to an almshouse, founded in 1240 by Sir John la Warr, 2nd Baron De La Warr (c. 1277–1347) who gave land in Horfield for the upkeep of the hospital. In 1291 he made a bequest of one hundred marks for the monks to chart in his memory and that of his relatives. The hospital served the poor of the city and travellers including seamen from Bristol Harbour. Separate male and female dormitories existed by the early 14th century but males were evicted by Eleanor the Prioress in 1330. The decision were reverted by the Bishop of Worcester is 1386. The Fraternity of St. Clement was established at the hospital in 1445, funded by a levy on ships in the harbour, with a specific responsibility for 12 sailors.

John Bautre was Masters of the Hospital of St Bartholomew in 1403.

After the Dissolution of the Monasteries it was bought by Robert Thorne and became Bristol Grammar School from 1532 to 1767, with the current front of the building being constructed in the 17th century. It has a jettied first floor. It was used as Queen Elizabeth's Hospital from 1767 to 1847. Three 17th-century town houses were then incorporated into model workers' flats around a courtyard in 1865, and converted to offices in 1978.

In the 1970s an archaeological excavation and search of documentary evidence of the site was carried out. 30 skeletons were uncovered which showed a range of fractures and infections indicating the sorts of conditions the hospital is likely to have treated.

== See also ==
- Grade II* listed buildings in Bristol
