= Augustus Desiré Waller =

British physiologist

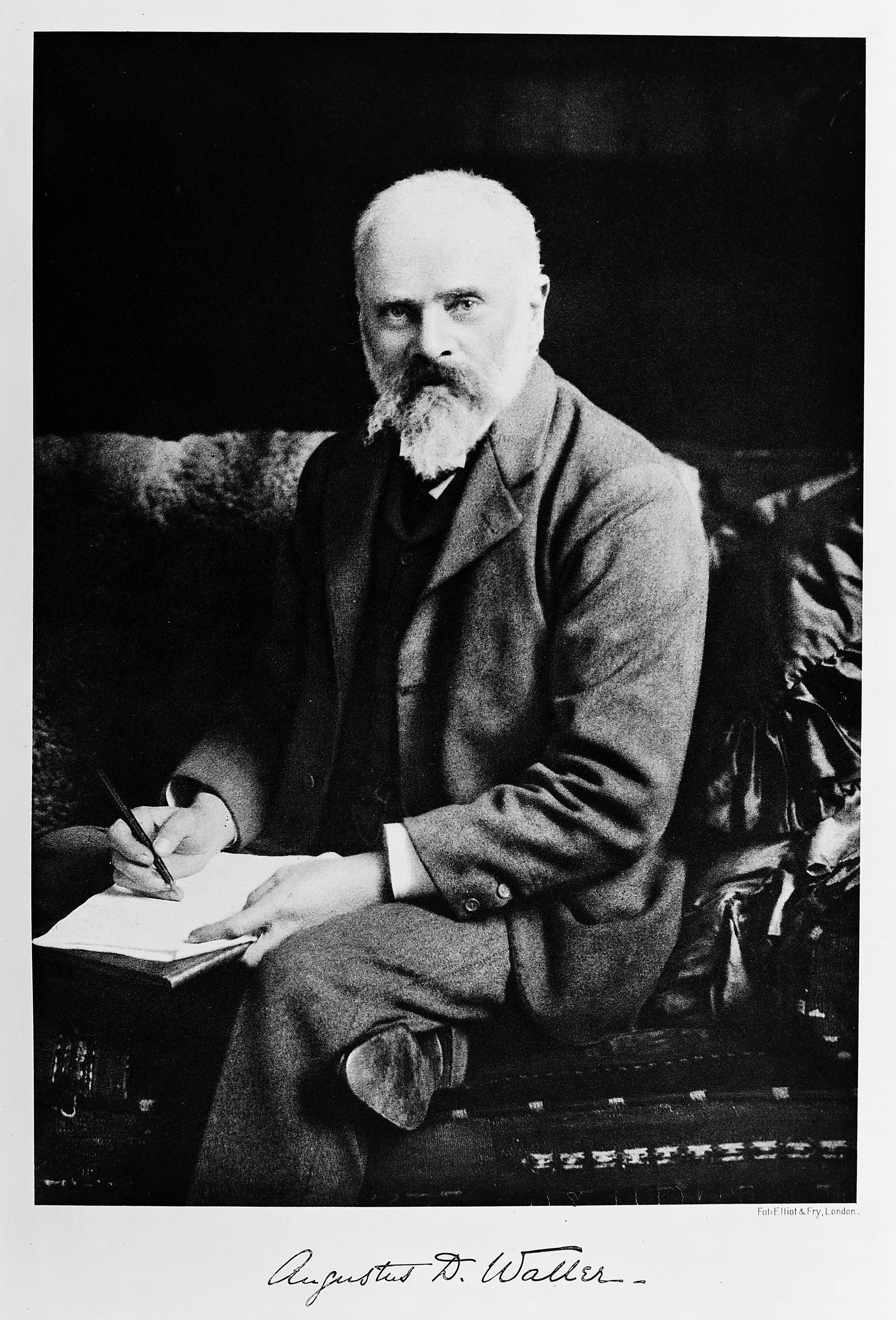
- Born: 12 July 1856; Paris
- Died: 11 March 1922 (aged 65); London
- Occupation: Physiologist

Augustus Desiré Waller FRS (12 July 1856 – 11 March 1922) was a British physiologist and the son of Augustus Volney Waller. He was born in Paris, France.

== Career ==
He studied medicine at Aberdeen University, where he qualified in 1878 and obtained his M.D. in 1881. In 1883, he became a lecturer in physiology at the London School of Medicine for Women. Whilst there he met his wife, Alice Palmer, who was one of his students and daughter of George Palmer, MP for Reading and founder of the biscuit manufacturers Huntley and Palmer.

In 1884 he became a lecturer in physiology at St Mary's Hospital. In 1887 he used a capillary electrometer to record the first human electrocardiogram.

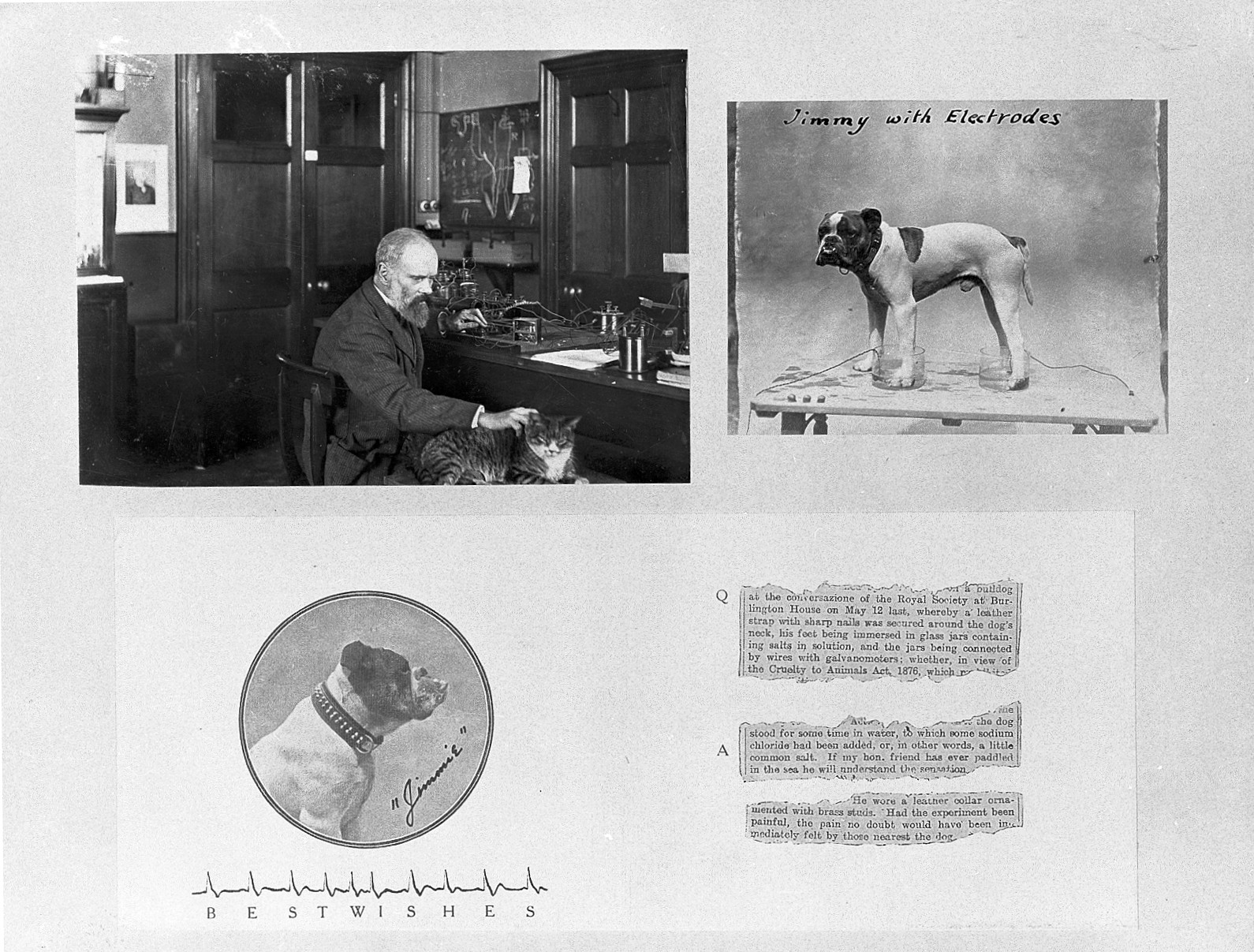
A.D. Waller in his laboratory with apparatus and cat. Photograph of his dog "Jimmy" with electrodes.

He created the first practical ECG machine with surface electrodes. He lectured on it in Europe and America, often using his dog Jimmy in his ECG demonstrations. Initially Waller did not think electrocardiograms would be useful in hospitals. However, eventually other physiologists such as Willem Einthoven and Thomas Lewis showed Waller that the traces could help diagnose heart conditions. In 1917, a few years before his death, Waller published a study of over 2000 traces of heart conditions.

Waller was involved in a dispute with J. C. Bose over who was the first to discover "vegetable electricity" (electrical activity in plants).

He was appointed Fullerian Professor of Physiology in 1896 with a starting date of 13 January 1897.

== Death ==
Waller died in London, on 11 March 1922 after suffering from two strokes.

Academic offices
Preceded by Charles Stewart	Fullerian Professor of Physiology; 1897–1898	Succeeded by Ray Lankester
