= Lewin's Mead Unitarian meeting house =

Church in Bristol, England

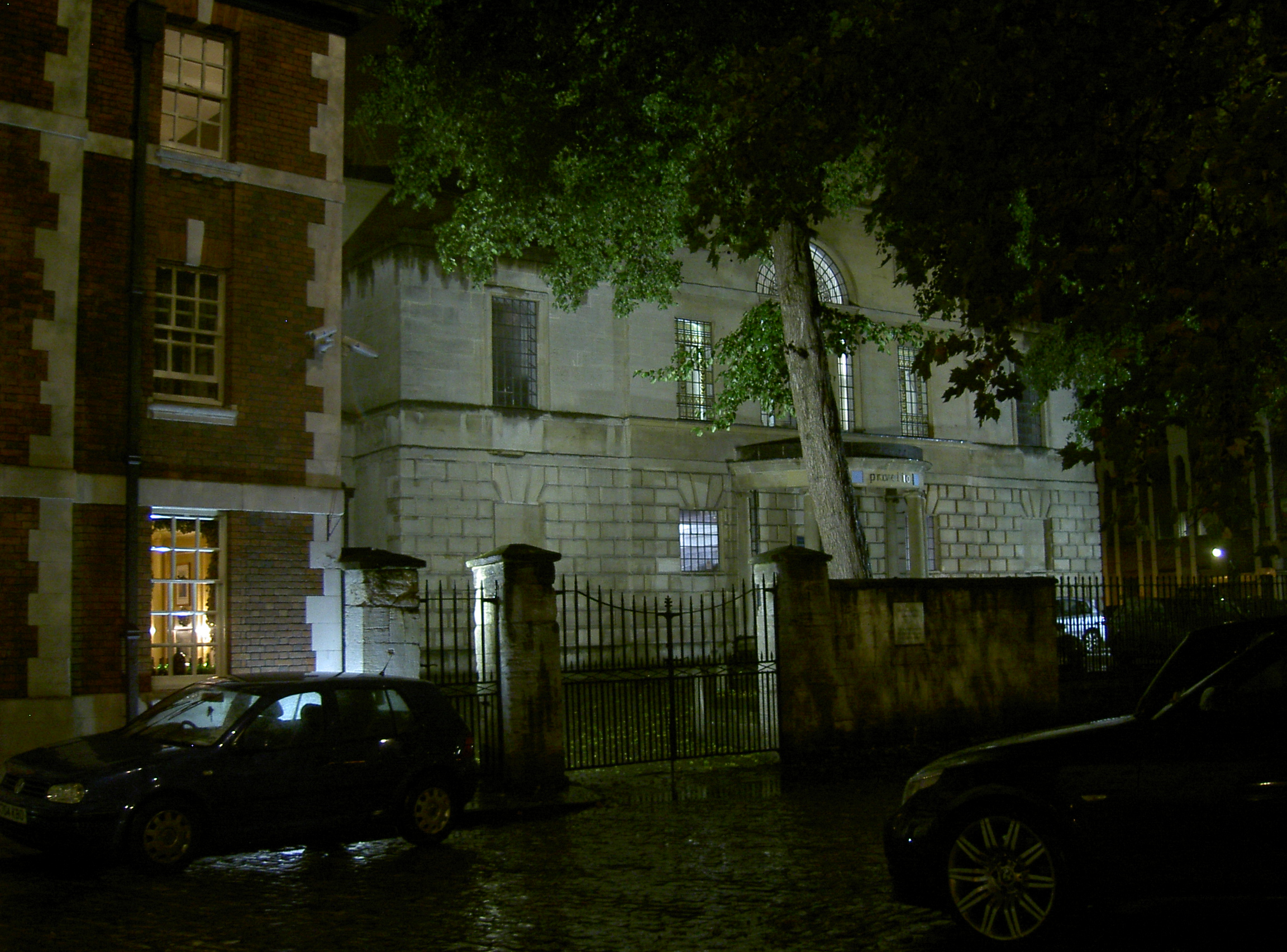
- Former Unitarian church in Lewin's Mead

- Location within Bristol

General information
- Architectural style: Neoclassical
- Location: Lewin's Mead, Bristol, England
- Coordinates: 51.45735°N 2.59243°W
- Year built: 1788–91

Design and construction
- Architect: William Blackburn

Listed Building – Grade II*
- Official name: Unitarian Chapel
- Designated: 8 January 1959
- Reference no.: 1202353

Lewin's Mead Unitarian meeting house is a former Unitarian church in Bristol, England.

== The building ==
The meeting house was constructed in 1788–1791 in Lewin's Mead on the site of a 1705 chapel; before that, the site had been a Franciscan monastery. The chapel was designed in the Neoclassical style by William Blackburn. It was built to hold 400 people, (Note: Another source says 1,000 people.) with stables and a coach house. A lecture room was added in 1818, and schoolrooms in 1826.

A Grade II* listed building since 1959, the meeting house closed in 1986 and was converted to offices the following year by Feilden Clegg architects, and housed the offices of a construction consultancy, Provelio.

In January 2017 it was purchased by Emmanuel Bristol, a family of Church of England churches, for its city centre congregation.

== The congregation and ministers ==
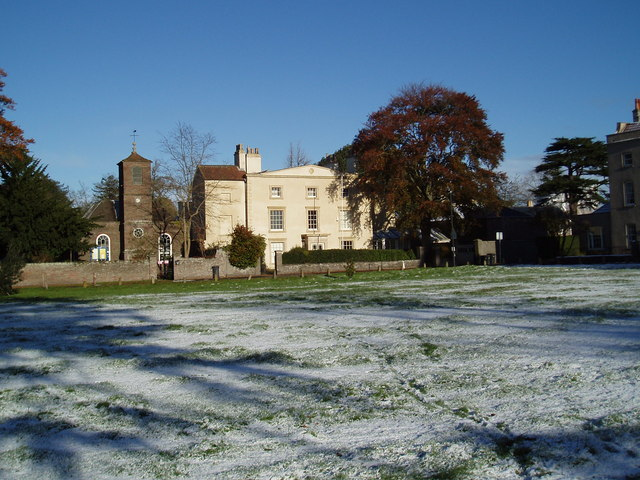
Frenchay Unitarian Chapel on the left, across the village green

In the 18th century, the congregation was wealthy.

One notable minister, from 1817 to 1839, was Lant Carpenter, the father of social reformer Mary Carpenter.

Unitarians continue to meet in Bristol at their other places of worship, Frenchay Chapel and Brunswick Square.

== See also ==
- Grade II* listed buildings in Bristol
