= Richard John Harrison =

Professor of anatomy at the University of Cambridge

Sir Richard John Harrison
- Born: 8 October 1920
- Died: 17 October 1999 (aged 79)
- Education: Gonville and Caius College, Cambridge
- Awards: Fellow of the Royal Society
- Scientific career
- Workplaces: University of Cambridge

Sir Richard John Harrison FRS (8 October 1920 – 17 October 1999) was a professor of anatomy at the University of Cambridge.

Harrison was educated at Oundle School and Gonville and Caius College, Cambridge, where he studied medicine and graduated MB BChir in 1944, before receiving further training at St Bartholomew's Hospital. He was the Fullerian Professor of Physiology from 1961 until 1967, and elected a Fellow of the Royal Society in 1973. He was elected President of the Anatomical Society of Great Britain and Ireland for 1977 to 1979.

Harrison was knighted in the 1984 Queen's Birthday Honours List. In 1985, Harrison was named an honorary member of the American Association for Anatomy.

Academic offices
Preceded by John Zachary Young	Fullerian Professor of Physiology; 1961–1967	Succeeded by Andrew Huxley
