= Thomas Rymer Jones =

English surgeon, academic and zoologist

Thomas Rymer Jones, FRS (1810 – 10 October 1880) was an English surgeon, academic and zoologist.

== Life ==
Jones was the son of a captain in the Royal Navy and he studied at Guy's Hospital in Paris. He became M.R.C.S. in 1833, but found himself unable to practice because of his hearing impairment.

Jones was appointed the first professor of comparative anatomy at King's College London, in 1836, and became the Fullerian Professor of Physiology at the Royal Institution in 1840 to 1842. In 1838, at the meeting of the British Association at Newcastle, he was the sole opponent of Christian Gottfried Ehrenberg, who maintained the polygastric nature of certain infusoria.

Jones was elected a Fellow of the Royal Society. He died in London on 10 December 1880, having resigned his professorship in 1874.

== Works ==
Jones's General Outline of the Animal Kingdom, and Manual of Comparative Anatomy, London, was published with woodcuts, 1838–41. It became a standard textbook. He wrote articles on comparative anatomy for Robert Bentley Todd's Cyclopædia of Anatomy and Physiology, and popular works on zoology. Jones wrote papers in scientific journals and:

- ‘The Natural History of Animals (Invertebrates only), being the substance of three Courses of Lectures as Fullerian Professor,’ London, 1845–52.
- ‘The Aquarian Naturalist, a Manual for the Seaside,’ London, 1858
- ‘The Animal Creation; a popular introduction to Zoology,’ London, 1865.
- ‘The Natural History of Birds, a popular introduction to Ornithology,’ London, 1867.
- ‘Mammalia: a popular introduction to Natural History,’ London, 1873.

He also edited William Kirby's Bridgewater Treatise, for Henry Bohn's series, in 1852; and a translation of the section Birds in Brehms Tierleben, issued as Cassell's Book of Birds in 1869–73.

Academic offices
Preceded by Robert Edmond Grant	Fullerian Professor of Physiology; 1840 – 1844	Succeeded by William Benjamin Carpenter
