= William Benjamin Carpenter =

English biologist (1813–1885)

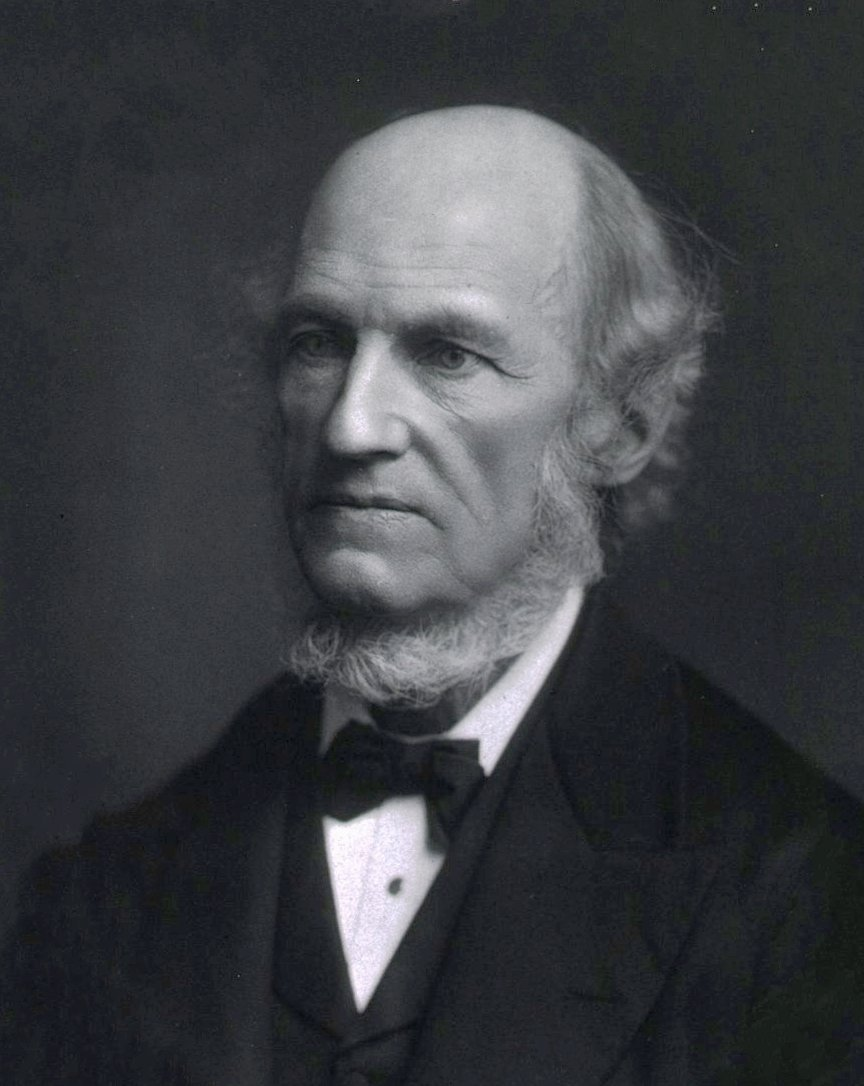
- Born: 29 October 1813; Exeter, Devon, England
- Died: 19 November 1885 (aged 72); London, England
- Resting place: Highgate Cemetery; 51.567°N 0.147°E
- Education: University College London; University of Edinburgh
- Occupations: Physiologist, neurologist, naturalist
- Years active: 1839–1879
- Title: MD Edin. (1839); FRS (1844); Fullerian Professor of Physiology (1844–1848); LL.D., Edin. (1871); President of the British Science Association (1872); CB (1879); Fellow of the Royal Botanic Society; FGS; FLS; MRCS; President of the Royal Medical Society
- Spouse: Louisa Powell (ca 1813–1887) married 1840
- Children: Five sons
- Parents: Dr Lant Carpenter, Anna Carpenter (née Penn)
- Relatives: Philip Pearsall Carpenter (brother); Russell Lant Carpenter (brother); Mary Carpenter (sister); Geoffrey Douglas Hale Carpenter (grandson)
- Awards: Royal Medal (1861); Lyell Medal (1883)

William Benjamin Carpenter CB FRS (29 October 1813 – 19 November 1885) was an English physician, invertebrate zoologist, and physiologist. He was instrumental in the early stages of the unified University of London.

== Life ==
Carpenter was born on 29 October 1813 in Exeter, the eldest son of Dr. Lant Carpenter and his wife, Anna Carpenter (née Penn). His father was an important Unitarian preacher who, according to Adrian Desmond, influenced a "rising generation of Unitarian intellectuals, including James Martineau and the Westminster Review's John Bowring." From his father, Carpenter learned to believe in the essential lawfulness of creation and that explanations of the world were to be found in physical causes. He embraced this "naturalistic cosmogony" as his starting point.

Carpenter was apprenticed in 1828 to the eye surgeon John Bishop Estlin, who was also the son of a Unitarian minister. He attended lectures at Bristol Medical School, then studied at University College London between 1834 and 1835, and then went to the University of Edinburgh, where he received his MD in 1839. He was elected as a member to the American Philosophical Society in 1845. In 1871, he received an LL.D. from the University of Edinburgh.

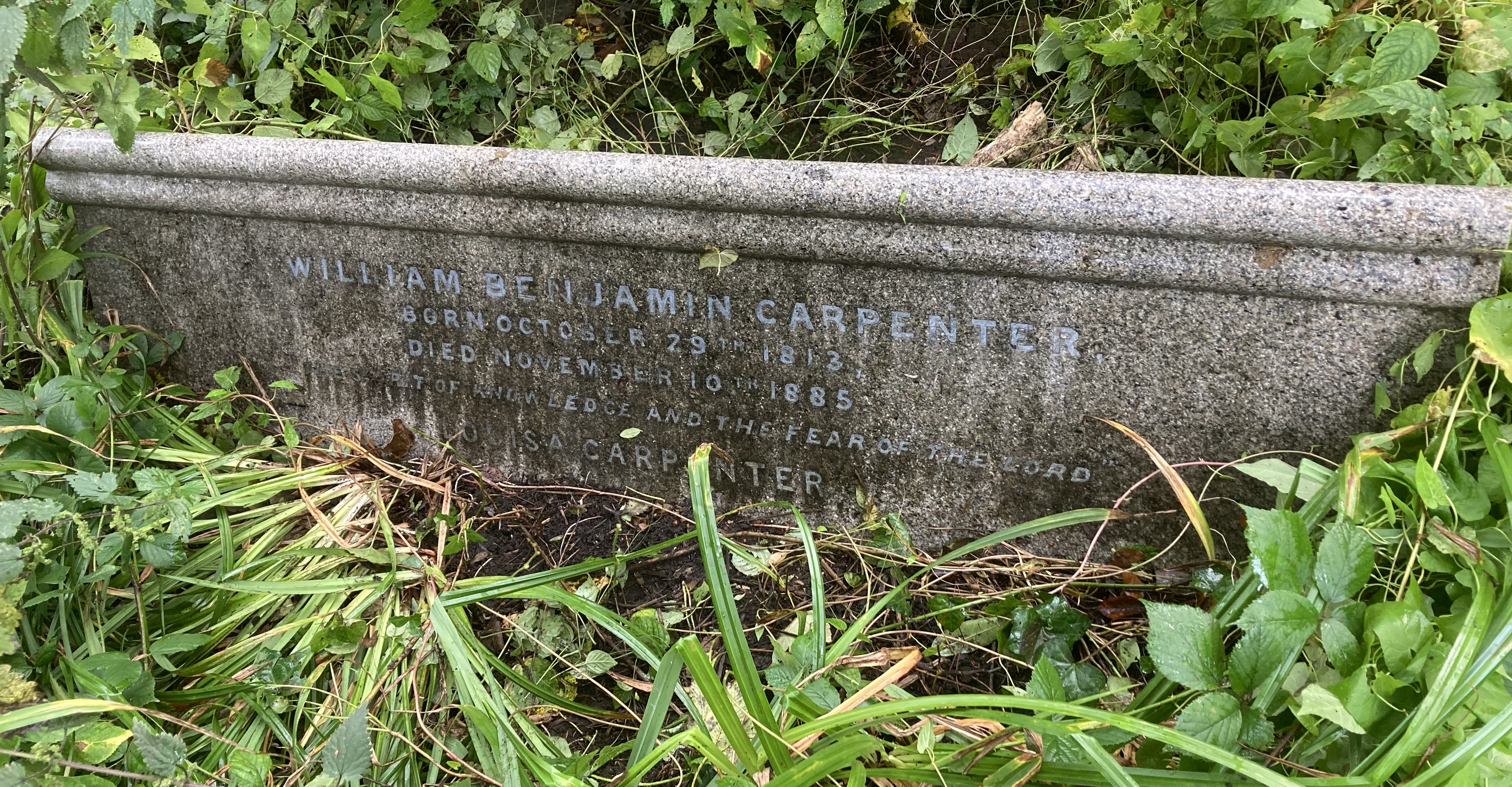
Grave of William Benjamin Carpenter in Highgate Cemetery

On his resignation in 1879, Carpenter was appointed CB in recognition of his services to education. He died on 19 November 1885 in London, having suffered burns when the fire heating a vapour bath he was taking was accidentally upset. He was buried in a family grave in the dissenter's section on the western side of Highgate Cemetery.

== Career ==
His graduation thesis on the nervous system of invertebrates, The Physiological Inferences to be deduced from the Structure of the Nervous System of Invertebrated Animals, won a gold medal, and led to his first books.He commenced his professional career as a physician in the Kingsdown suburb of Bristol. His work in comparative neurology was recognised in 1844 by his election as a Fellow of the Royal Society. His appointment as Fullerian Professor of Physiology at the Royal Institution in 1845 enabled him to exhibit his prowess as a teacher and lecturer. He was credited with having a gift of ready speech and luminous interpretation that placed him in the front rank of exponents, at a time when the popularisation of science was in its infancy.

He was appointed the first Swiney lecturer in Geology at the British Museum in 1847.

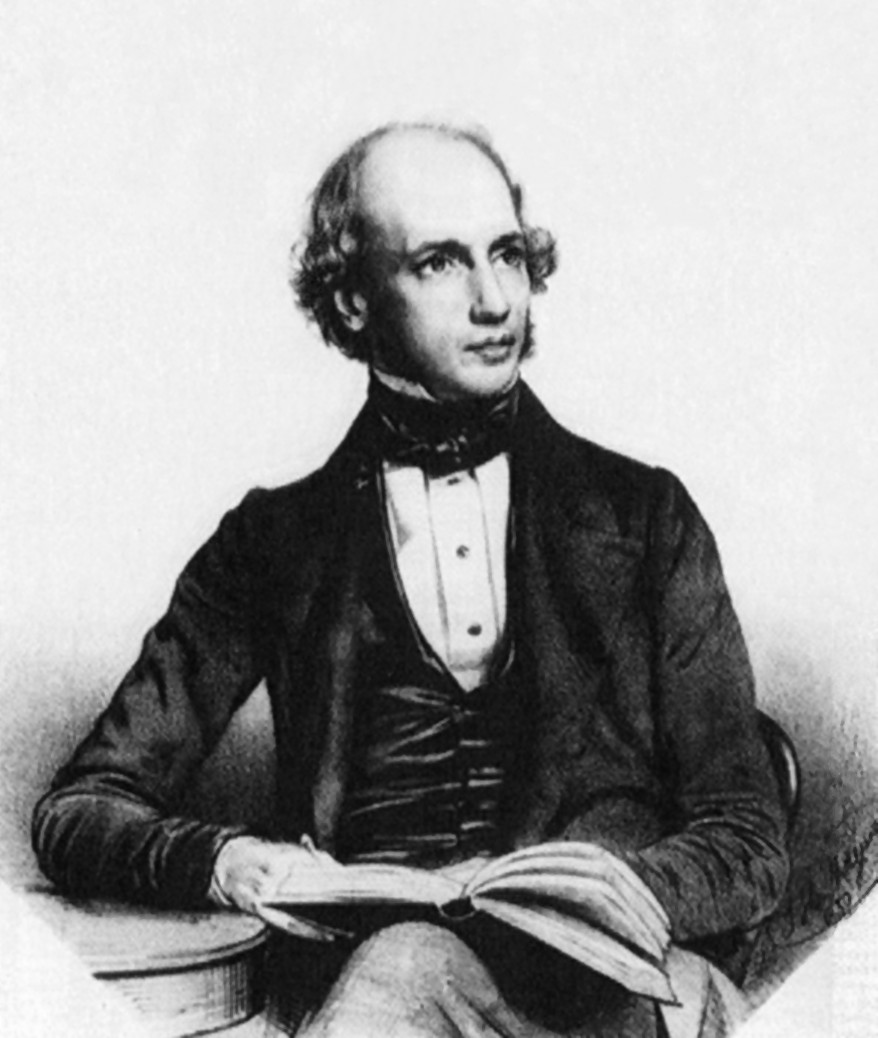
Carpenter in 1850

He worked hard as investigator, author, editor, demonstrator and lecturer throughout his life; but it was his researches in marine zoology, notably in the lower organisms, as foraminifera and crinoids, that were most valuable. This research gave an impetus to deep-sea exploration and led to Carpenter's role, alongside the naturalist Charles Wyville Thomson, in leading the exploration missions of HMS Lightning and HMS Porcupine in northern Scotland from 1868 to 1870. The analysis of the physical observations made during these first cruises allowed Carpenter to sketch a new theory of the global ocean circulation, which differed in several points from the pioneering theory of the hydrographer Matthew Fontaine Maury. Based on the context of the time, including the development of underwater telegraphy, Carpenter was the main architect in convincing both the Admiralty and the British government to undertake a large-scale oceanographic expedition in order to extend observations on a global scale. These efforts led to the HMS Challenger circumnavigation from 1872 to 1876, which was the world's first major oceanographic expedition.

He took a keen and laborious interest in the evidence adduced by Canadian geologists as to the organic nature of the so-called Eozoon canadense, discovered in the Laurentian strata, also called the North American craton, and at the time of his death had nearly finished a monograph on the subject, defending the now discredited theory of its animal origin. He was adept in the use of the microscope, and his popular treatise on it stimulated many to explore this new aid. He was awarded the Royal Medal in 1861.

Carpenter's most famous work is The Use and Abuse of Alcoholic Liquors in Health and Disease, originally published as a long-form essay in London by Charles Gilpin in March 1850. It was one of the first temperance books to promote the view that alcoholism is a disease.

In 1856 Carpenter became Registrar of the University of London, and held the office for 23 years. He gave qualified support to Charles Darwin, but he had reservations as to the application of evolution to man's intellectual and spiritual nature. He also demonstrated his commitment to the education of women, by teaching at the newly founded Bedford College, London in 1849 and 1850.

== Adaptive unconscious ==
Carpenter is considered one of the founders of the modern theory of the adaptive unconscious. Together with William Hamilton and Thomas Laycock they provided the foundations on which adaptive unconscious is based today. They observed that the human perceptual system almost completely operates outside of conscious awareness. These same observations have been made by Hermann Helmholtz. Because these views were in conflict with the theories of Descartes, they were largely neglected, until the cognitive revolution of the 1950s. In 1874 Carpenter noticed that the more he studied the mechanism of thought, the more clear it became that it operates largely outside awareness. He noticed that the unconscious prejudices can be stronger than conscious thought and that they are more dangerous since they happen outside of conscious.

He also noticed that emotional reactions can occur outside of conscious until attention is drawn to them:

Our feelings towards persons and objects may undergo most important changes, without our being in the least degree aware, until we have our attention directed to our own mental state, of the alteration which has taken place in them.

He also asserted both the freedom of the will and the existence of the ego.

== Psychical research ==
Carpenter was a critic of claims of paranormal phenomena, psychical research, and spiritualism, which he wrote were "epidemic delusions".

He was the author of the book Mesmerism, Spiritualism, Etc: Historically and Scientifically Considered (1877), which is seen as an early text on anomalistic psychology. According to Carpenter, Spiritualist practices could be explained by psychological factors such as hypnotism and suggestion. He rejected any occult or supernatural interpretation of hypnotism or trance-like states and insisted they were explained entirely by the physiology of the human mind. He argued that ideomotor effect (also called the Carpenter effect) could explain the phenomena of dowsing and table-turning. After experimental researches with tables, Michael Faraday credited to Carpenter the theoretical explanations for the results that he obtained.

Carpenter identified as a rationalist and a Unitarian. Although critical of spiritualism, he was interested in the subject of "thought reading". He defended the mentalist Washington Irving Bishop, whom he had experimented with, and considered such feats to be of great interest to the study of physiology. This angered his colleagues, who felt that his public support for Bishop might damage the respectability of the scientific community. He was criticized by George Romanes and T. H. Huxley for his interest in thought reading.

Carpenter was a believer in a divine first cause. Historian Shannon Delorme has noted that although he was considered a "great debunker of all humbug", his scientific thought was influenced by Unitarian culture that accommodated both materialist and teleological arguments.

== Family ==
Carpenter married Louisa Powell in 1840 in Exeter. Louisa was born about 1814 in Exeter and died in 1887 in London. Among their children were:

- Philip Herbert Carpenter (1852–1891), zoologist and a master at Eton College. He assisted his father and wrote extensively on fossils.
- Joseph Estlin Carpenter (1844–1927), theologian and Unitarian.

== Collections ==
University College London holds letters from George Grote to Thomas Spencer Baynes and Carpenter.

== Works ==
- Carpenter, W. B. (1839). Principles of General and Comparative Physiology, Intended as an Introduction to the Study of Human Physiology and as a Study Guide to the Pursuit of Natural History. London: John Churchill.
- —— (1842). Principles of Human Physiology, with their Chief Applications to Pathology, Hygiène, and Forensic Medicine. London: John Churchill.
- —— (1843). Animal Physiology. Popular Cyclopaedia of Natural Science. London: William S. Orr and Company.
- —— (1845). Zoology, being a Sketch of the Classification, Structure, Distribution, and Habits of animals. Popular Cyclopaedia of Natural Science. London: William S. Orr and Company.
- —— (1847). Zoology: a Systematic Account of the General Structure, Habits, Instincts, and Uses of the Principal Families of the Animal Kingdom. London: William S. Orr and Company.
- —— (1850). On the Use and Abuse of Alcoholic Liquors, in Health and Disease. London: Charles Gilpin.
- —— (1852). "On the Influence of Suggestion in Modifying and directing Muscular Movement, independently of Volition". Notices of the Proceedings at the Meetings of the Members of the Royal Institution. 1. London: The Royal Institution of Great Britain: 147–153.
- —— (1874). Principles of Mental Physiology, with their Applications to the Training and Discipline of the Mind, and the Study of its Morbid Conditions. New York: D. Appleton and Company.
- —— (1877). Mesmerism, Spiritualism, etc, Historically and Scientifically Considered. London: Longmans, Green, and Company.
- ——; Carpenter, J. E. (1888). Nature and Man: Essays Scientific and Philosophical. London: Kegan Paul, Trench and Company.

== See also ==
- European and American voyages of scientific exploration

Academic offices
Preceded by Thomas Rymer Jones	Fullerian Professor of Physiology; 1844–1848	Succeeded by William Withey Gull
