= Charles Stewart (zoologist) =

English zoologist and comparative anatomist

Charles Stewart (18 May 1840 – 27 September 1907) was an English zoologist and comparative anatomist. He was elected a Fellow of the Royal Society on 4 June 1896, and he was the president of the Linnean Society from 1890 to 1894.

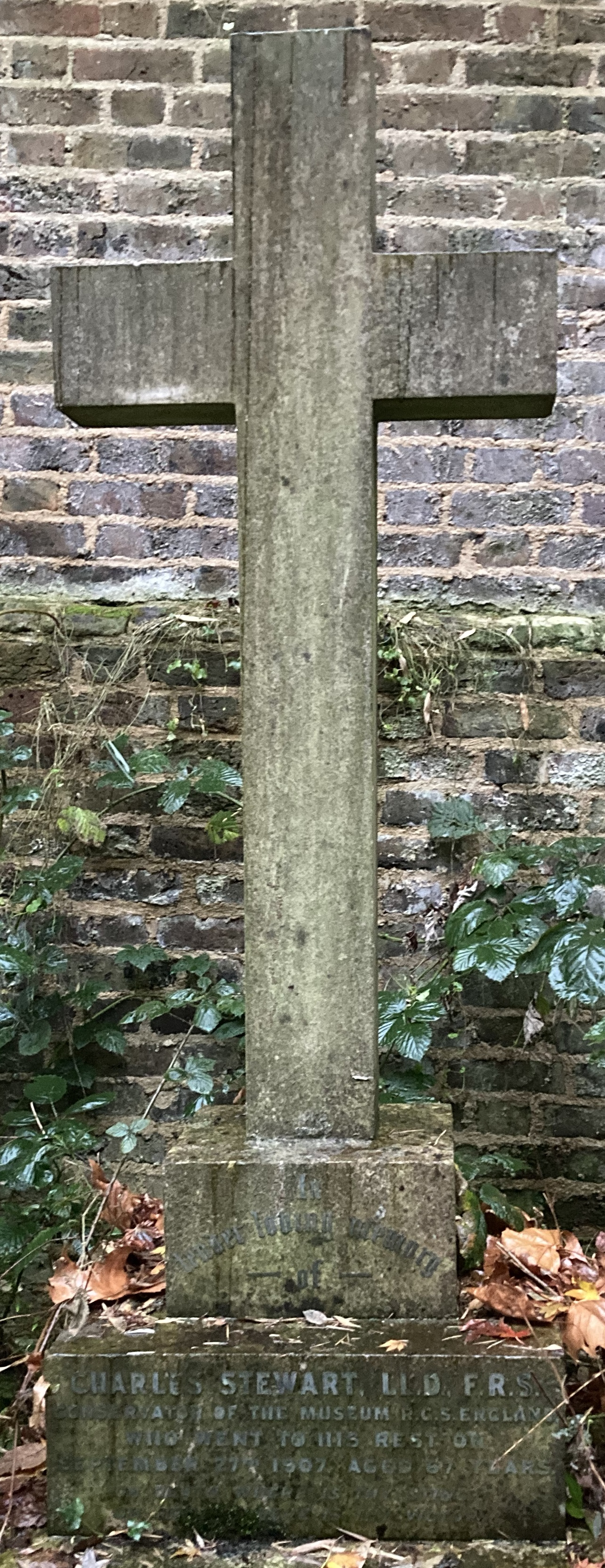
Grave of Charles Stewart (zoologist) in Highgate Cemetery

== Life ==
Stewart was born in Plymouth and studied at St Bartholomew's Hospital, receiving his MRCS in 1862. He was Conservator of the Hunterian Museum of the Royal College of Surgeons of England from 1884 to 1900, in succession to William Henry Flower.

After practising for four years at Plymouth, he was appointed in 1866 curator of the museum at St Thomas's Hospital, then situated in the Surrey Gardens. In 1871, shortly after the removal of the hospital to the Albert Embankment, he was appointed lecturer on comparative anatomy in the medical school, and in 1881 he became lecturer on physiology jointly with Dr. John Harley. He was also professor of biology and physiology at the Bedford College for Women from 1882 to 1886.

He left St. Thomas's Hospital in 1884 on his appointment as conservator of the Hunterian museum at the Royal College of Surgeons in succession to Sir William Henry Flower. In 1886, he became Hunterian professor of comparative anatomy and physiology at the college, and gave an annual course of lectures until 1902. Stewart fully maintained at the college the Hunterian tradition. Abreast of the current knowledge of anatomy, physiology, and bacteriology, which together make up modern pathology, he was able to utilise to the best advantage the stores of specimens collected by John Hunter. His dissections enabled him to correlate many facts for the first time, and his results were set forth in his lectures. In 1885, he lectured on the structure and life history of the hydrozoa; in 1886 and 1887 on the organs of hearing; in 1889 and again in 1896 on the integumental system; in 1890 on phosphorescent organs and colour; in 1891 on secondary sexual characters; in 1895 on the endoskeleton; in 1897 on joints, and on the protection and nourishment of the young; in 1899 on the alternation of generations. He spoke without notes and drew admirably on the blackboard, illustrating his remarks from the stores of the museum. But unhappily the lectures were neither published nor reported, and only remain in the memories of his auditors or in their scanty notes. His valuable work survives alone in the catalogues of the Hunterian museum.

In spite of ill-health Stewart was active outside the College of Surgeons. From 1894 to 1897, he was Fullerian professor of physiology at the Royal Institution, where on two occasions he delivered the ’Friday evening' discourse. In 1866, he was elected a fellow of the Linnean Society, and served as its president (1890–4). He also took an active part in founding the Anatomical Society of Great Britain and Ireland, of which he was the original treasurer (1887–1892). He also served as secretary of the Royal Microscopical Society from 1879 to 1883. He was deeply interested in the welfare of the Marine Biological Association, which was established at Plymouth, his native place. He was admitted F.R.S. in 1896, and in 1899 he received the honorary degree of LL.D. from Aberdeen.

He died in London on 27 September 1907, and was buried on the western side of Highgate Cemetery.

== Family ==
He married in 1867 Emily Browne, and left three sons and two daughters.

Academic offices
Preceded by Victor Horsley	Fullerian Professor of Physiology; 1894–1897	Succeeded by Augustus Desiré Waller
