= Russell Lant Carpenter =

- Born: 17 December 1816; Bristol, Somerset, England, United Kingdom
- Died: 1892 (aged 75–76); England
- Years active: 1816–1892
- Known for: Minister, Unitarian
- Parent(s): Lant Carpenter, Anna Penn
- Relatives: William Benjamin Carpenter (brother); Philip Pearsall Carpenter (brother); Mary Carpenter (sister)

Russell Lant Carpenter (17 December 1816 – 1892), a Unitarian minister who carried on the works of his father, Dr. Lant Carpenter and wrote his biography. He was a brother of the social reformer Mary Carpenter.

Carpenter was born in 1816 in Kidderminster, Worcester, England and was christened in Devonshire, England. He died in 1892.

== Books ==
- Memoirs of the Life of Rev. Lant Carpenter, LL.D., by Carpenter, Russell Lant, B.A. (1842) Published: Green, Newgate Street, London, England and Philip and Evans, Calre Street, Bristol, England. Online at: GoogleBooks.
- Memoir of the Rev. Lant Carpenter, LL.D. by Carpenter, Russell Lant, B.A. (1875) and abridged by his sister, Mary Carpenter. Published by: E. T. Whitfield, 178 Strand, W. C., London, England. Printed by: Arrowsmith Printer, Quay Street, Bristol, England.

== See also ==
- John Barling
