= Christmas Steps, Bristol =

Street in Bristol, England

Coordinates: 51.4561°N 2.5968°W

Christmas Steps
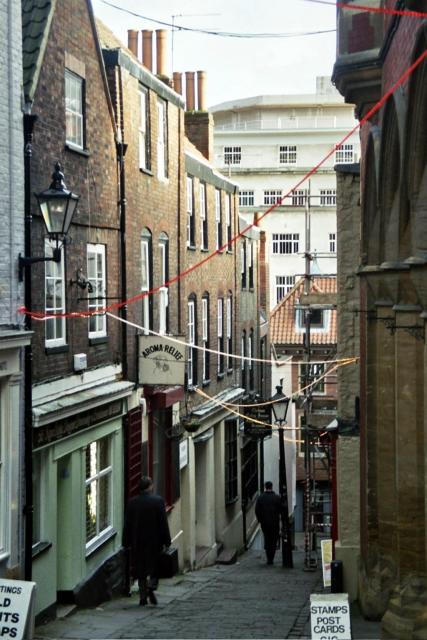
- Looking down Christmas Steps

- Location within Bristol
- OS grid reference: ST586731
- Unitary authority: Bristol
- Ceremonial county: Bristol
- Region: South West
- Country: England
- Sovereign state: United Kingdom
- Post town: BRISTOL
- Postcode district: BS
- Dialling code: 0117
- Police: Avon and Somerset
- Fire: Avon
- Ambulance: South Western

Christmas Steps is a historic street in the city centre of Bristol, England.

== Name ==
The name comes from the medieval Knifesmith Street. In Middle English the 'K' in 'knife' and 'knight' was sounded. It seems likely "Knifesmith Street" became corrupted over time to "Christmas Street". In William Worcestre's 1480 itinerary of Bristol, he describes it as "knyfesmythstrete aliter [alias] Cristmastrete". The street continued to be recorded as "Christmas Street" in the official town rentals of the sixteenth and seventeenth centuries. This is also how it is recorded in the Hearth Tax Books of Bristol in the 1660s. Christmas Street still runs from St John's Gate to St Bartholomew's Hospital at the bottom of "Christmas Steps". The end near the hospital is now bisected by the widened Rupert Street and the very end part, in front of St Bartholomew's, is pedestrianised. In 1480, Worcestre described the road now called "Christmas Steps" as "Stypstrete" (Steep Street) it being "the road on the west side of the church of St Bartholomew of Bristol, going to St Michael's Church".

According to the late-17th-century stone plaque at the top of the steps, the street was renamed "Queene Streete" during the mayoralty of Sir Robert Yeamans (1669/70) after it was "steppered down" by the wine merchant, Jonathan Blackwell. A Bristol chronicle of c.1687 confirms that "Jonathan Blackwell, vintner, new made the stepps on St Michael's Hill, and finished it in 1669, at his own costs, being called by the name of Queen-street". The claim is repeated in an 18th-century Bristol chronicle: "Jonathan Blackwell Vintner new erected and built Saint Michaels Hill steps at his own costs and called it by the name of Queen Street". It is unclear from these statements whether the street had steps before 1669 since "new made" and "new erected" can refer to both an entirely new building work and the renovation of an existing one.

In the 17th century, Christmas Steps were sometimes referred to as Lunsford's Stairs. This was in honour of a Cavalier officer Colonel Henry Lunsford, who was shot through the heart on Steep Street on 26 July 1643 while taking part in the Storming of Bristol during the English Civil War.

The steps are labelled "Queene Str" in the 1673 James Millerd's Map of Bristol and the updated 1728 version of Millerd's map. The Rocque Map of 1743 labels the steps "Queen Str. or Stipe Str." The alternative name he provides suggests that some people continued to call the steps by the old name of "Steep Street". The steps were described as "Queen Str Steps" on the 1824 Ashmead map of Bristol and "Queen Street" on the 1874 Ashmead Map. However, by the time of the official town plans of Bristol (1879–88), as well as the first Ordnance Survey maps of the late nineteenth century, the street is described as "Christmas Steps". It seems likely that this represented the formal adoption of a popular local name for the steps.

After the main set of steps, the steps continue on the other side of Colston Street (1870) and then again across Perry Road (1868), leading to St Michael on the Mount Without. These steps were originally unbroken by the 2 roads and known as St. Michael's steps (on the 1855 G. C. Ashmead map).

== History ==
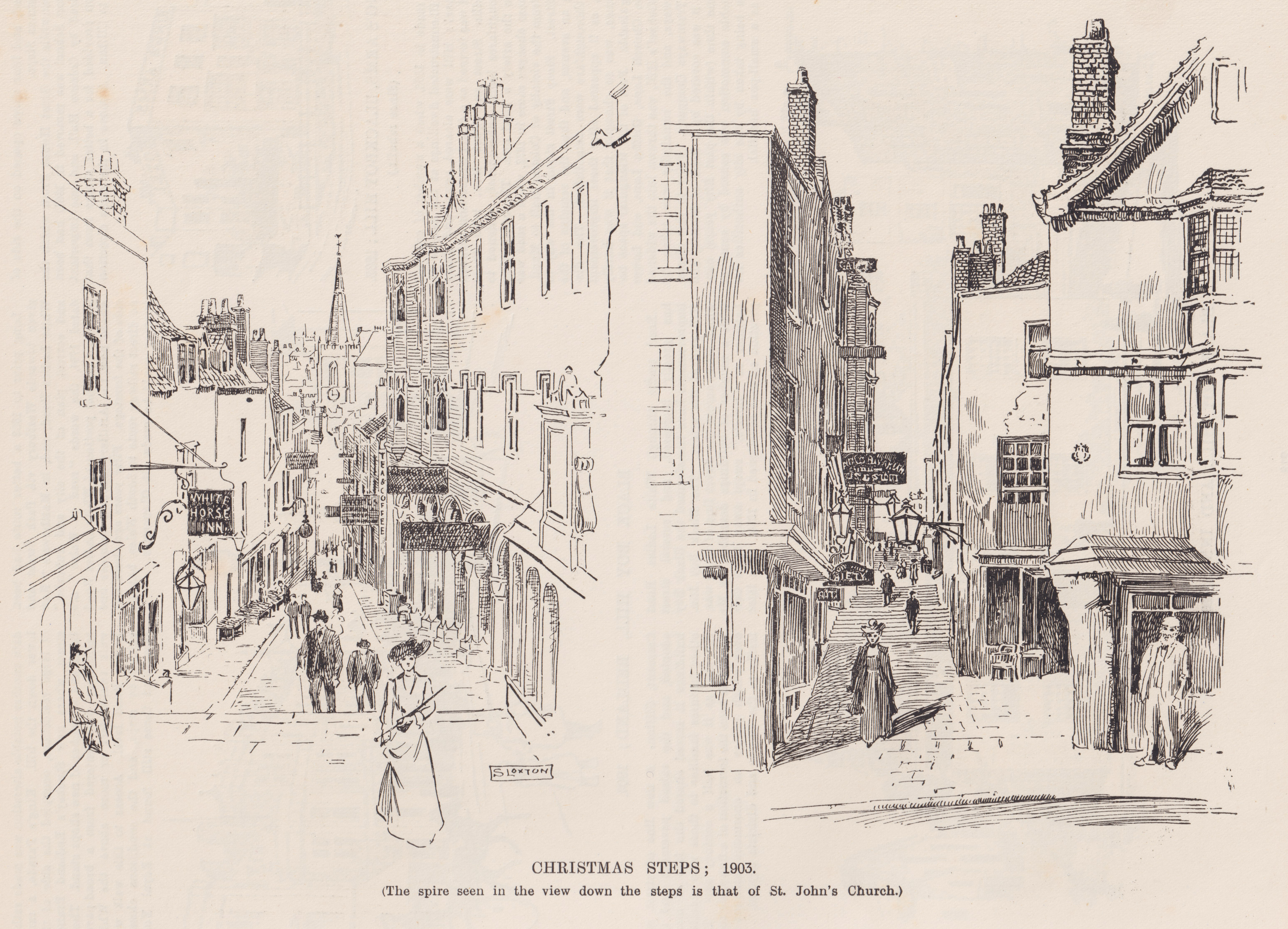

The steep-slanted steps were new made in September 1669 and were paid for by wealthy wine merchant, Jonathan Blackwell. At the top of the steps, the stairs are flanked by stone alcoves, similar in design to the stone alcove seats found in many churches. These were presumably to allow people to rest on the long climb up to St Michael's. The steps and the alcoves were rebuilt between 1865 and 1881. They are classified as are Grade II listed buildings by Historic England.

Christmas Steps are now home to a variety of small shops, galleries, cafes and bars, also known as "Christmas Steps Arts Quarter".

The listed buildings on the steps include:

- No.1: The Sugar Loaf Public House, c.1720
- No 12, c.1800
- No 13 & 14, c.1800
- No 15, late C17, refronted early C19
- No 16, early C19
- No 18–19, early C19
- No 20, early C19
- No 3, c.1800
- No 4, c.1800
- No 5, c.1800
- No 6 & 7, c.1800

== In popular culture ==
- The song Christmas Steps by Mogwai is named after the street.
- The street appears in the last chapter of Terry Pratchett's novel Dodger as the location of the pharmacist where Dodger buys hair dyes to disguise himself and Simplicity.

== Gallery ==
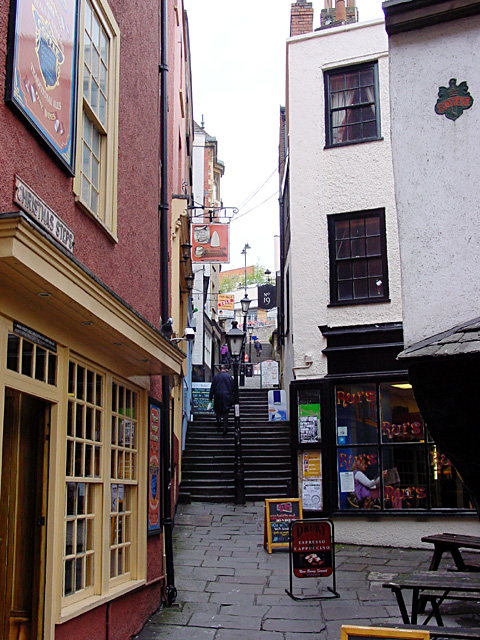
Looking up Christmas Steps

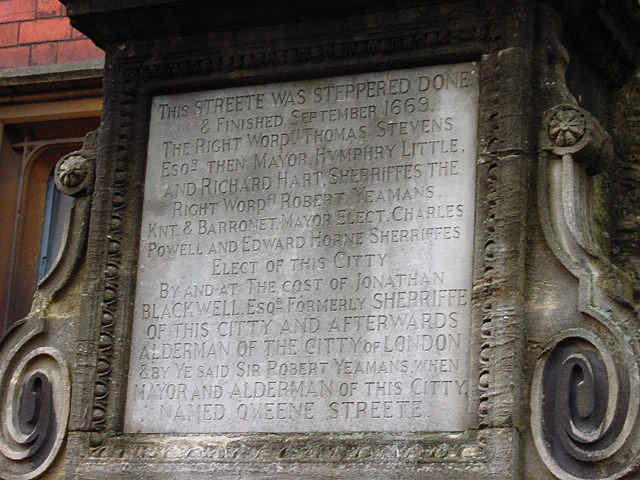
Plaque at top of Christmas Steps

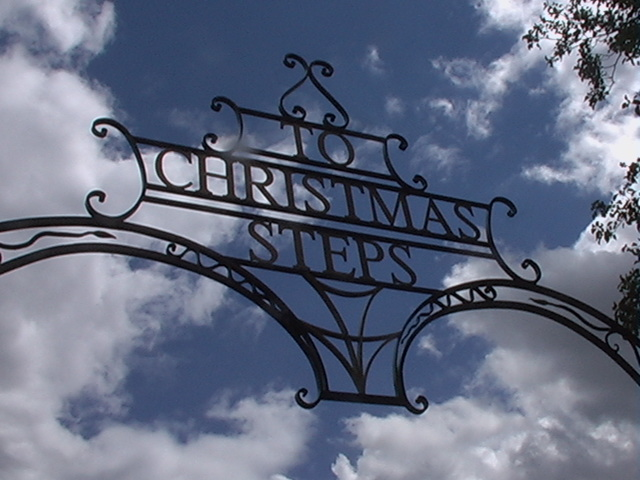
Metal sign at the top of Christmas Steps

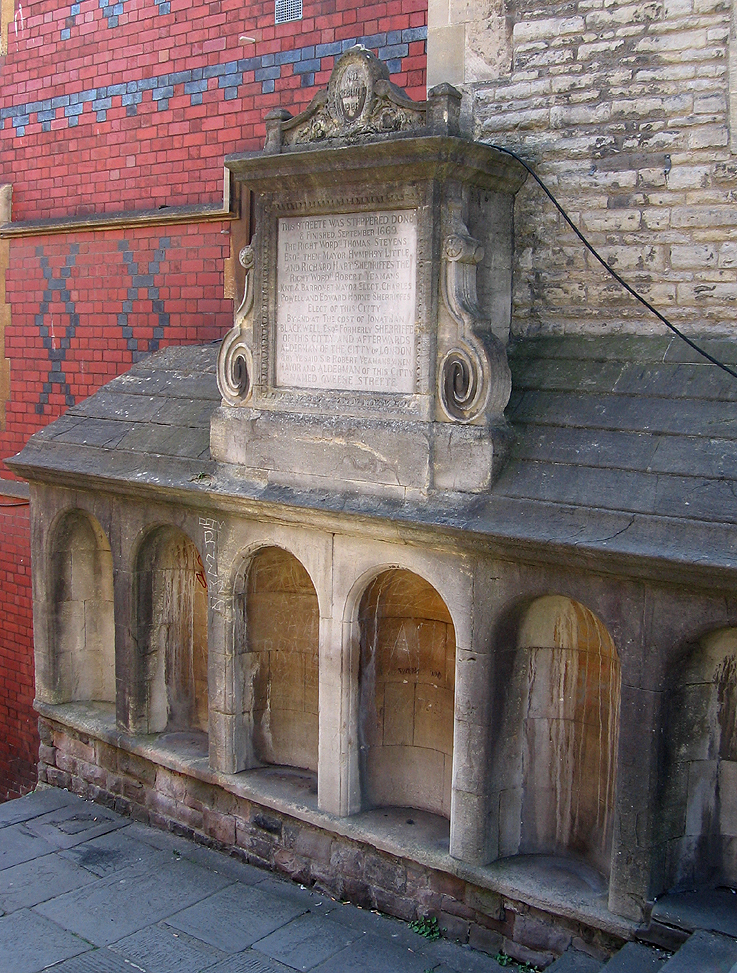
Alcoves at the top of Christmas Steps

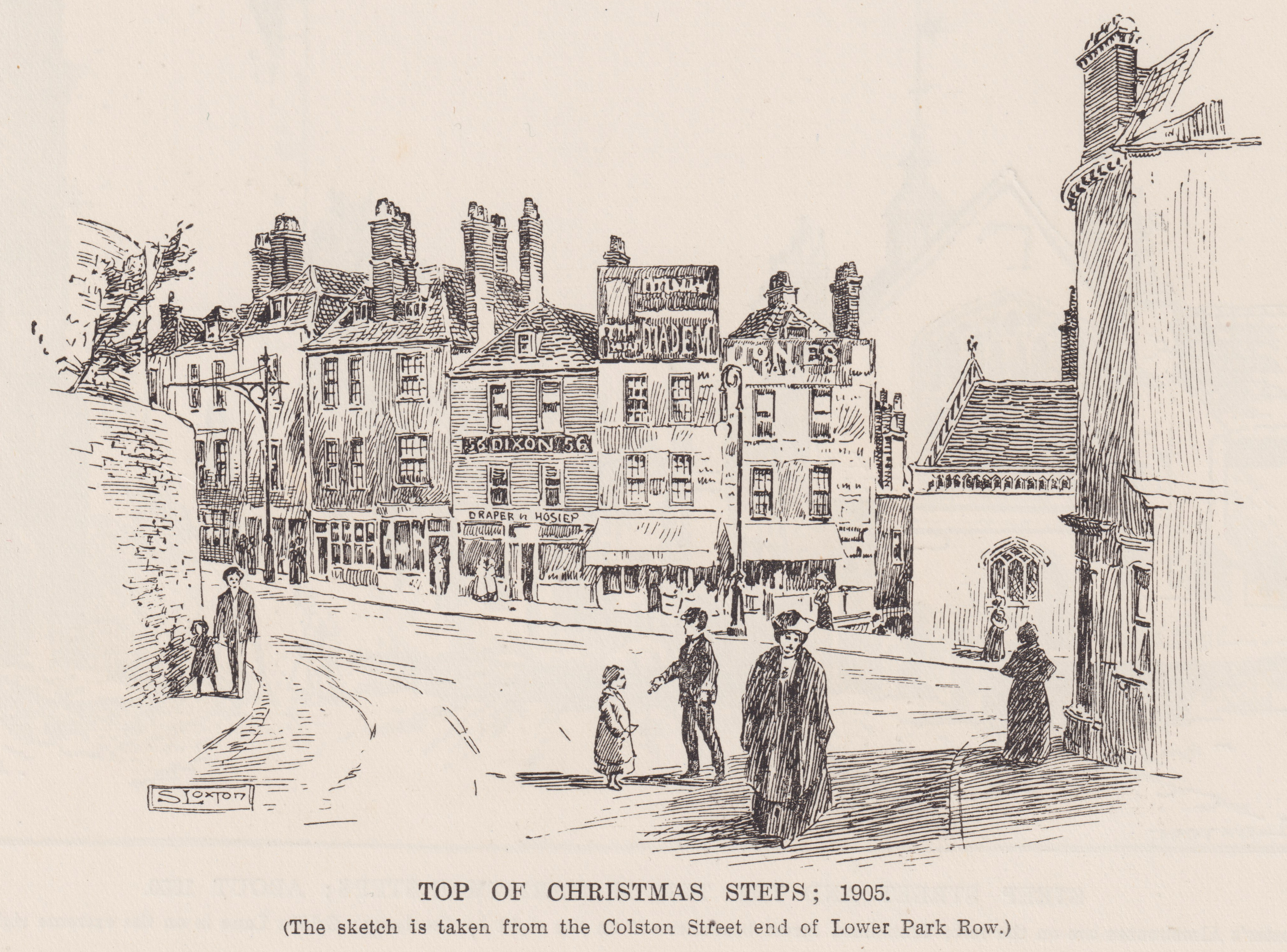
Top of Christmas Steps, 1905
