= William Blackburn =

British architect (1750–1790)

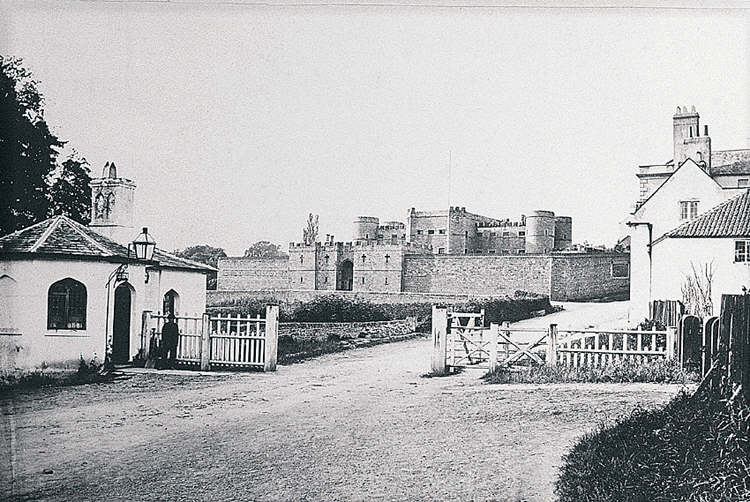
Monmouth County Gaol designed by Blackburn and opened in 1790

William Blackburn (1750–1790) was an English architect and the leading prison architect of the Georgian-era. Following the principles of John Howard, his designs aimed to provide inmates with dry and airy cells.

== Biography ==
Blackburn was born in Southwark, London, the son of a tradesman and his wife, who may have been Spanish. He was apprenticed to a surveyor, but "derived very little advantage" from his master. When only nineteen he competed for the design of the Royal Exchange, Dublin; four years later he entered the Royal Academy Schools, where he won the silver medal in 1773 for a drawing of the interior of Christopher Wren's St Stephen Walbrook.

In 1776 he was named surveyor to the Watermen's Guild, and he may have designed their Hall near St Mary-at-Hill, Eastcheap. He was also surveyor for St Thomas' Hospital and Guy's Hospital; he also designed a private home in Denmark Hill.

The passage of the Penitentiary Act in 1779 dictated the course of his career. In 1782 he won first prize for prison design in a contest sponsored by the Commissioners for Penitentiary Houses. While those designs were never realized, his entry led him to friendship with Howard and to extensive work as an architect of prisons.

In England, his jails include the old City Gaol in Oxford (demolished 1870), the New Borough Gaol in Liverpool, county gaols in Gloucester and Northleach, the County Gaol in Ipswich, and Salop Prison in Shrewsbury. He also altered the Newgate Gaol in Dublin and designed the Limerick and Monmouth County Gaol.

Blackburn is also credited with the design of Lewin's Mead Unitarian meeting house, a Unitarian chapel in Bristol.

He married Lydia Hobson, a Quaker, in 1783. He died unexpectedly at Preston, Lancashire in November 1790, while travelling to Glasgow to consult on plans for a prison there. He is buried at Bunhill Fields.

== Bibliography ==
- Colvin, H. M. (1954). A Biographical Dictionary of English Architects, 1660–1840. Cambridge, Mass: Harvard University Press.
- Jewkes, Yvonne (2007). Handbook of Prisons. Portland: Willans.
- Morris, Norval and David Rothman (1995). The Oxford History of the Prison. Oxford: Oxford University Press.
