= Tim Barling =

Australian rules footballer

Personal information
- Born: 21 June 1965 (age 61); Birchip
- Original team: Birchip
- Height: 200 cm (6 ft 7 in)
- Weight: 90 kg (198 lb)

Playing career^{1}
Years	Club	Games (Goals)
1984–1985	Richmond	14 (1)
1989–1990	Sydney Swans	13 (2)
Total		27 (3)
- ^{1} Playing statistics correct to the end of 1990.

Tim Barling (born 21 June 1965) is a former Australian rules footballer who played with Richmond and the Sydney Swans in the Victorian/Australian Football League (VFL/AFL).

Barling, ruckman from Birchip, made his league debut for Richmond in the final round of the 1984 season, against Melbourne at the Melbourne Cricket Ground. The following year he played 13 games.

He was one of many players recruited from other clubs by the Sydney Swans prior to the 1986 season, but missed the first half of the year with a knee injury. Once he recovered, he was told by the club that they were unable to grant him a playing permit due to the salary cap. He returned to Birchip, with a promise that he would play for the Swans in 1987. However, during pre-season trials in 1987, Barling again injured his knee and required a knee reconstruction. He finally debuted for Sydney in 1989, playing five games that year, from round 17 to the end of the season. In 1990 he made a further eight appearances. He has two children.
