= John Barling =

English dissenting minister

John Barling (11 August 1804 – 1883), was an English dissenting minister.

Barling was born at Weymouth 11 August 1804. He was educated for the ministry at Homerton, and settled as a congregationalist minister at Square Chapel, Halifax, in 1829. His opinions becoming unitarian, he resigned his charge in 1834, and became a worshipper at Northgate End Chapel. After a sojourn of some years in the south of England he returned to Halifax, and made public manifestation of his new views in some lectures on the Atonement (1849) at Northgate End, of which he became minister in January 1854 on the death of William Turner. From January 1856 he had as colleague Russell Lant Carpenter, BA He retired from the ministry in January 1858, and resided, in studious leisure, at Belle Grange, Windermere, for many years, and subsequently at Leeds, where he died 20 Aug. 1883. Through his first wife (d. September 1857), the elder daughter of Riley Kitson, of Halifax, he had acquired considerable property. He was married to his second wife, Emma Ellis, on 16 Jan. 1862. He left four sons. He had a mind of metaphysical power, and a spirit never embittered by controversy. Through life he adhered to the Paley type of teleology, and his unitarianism was cast in a scriptural mould. He published: 1. 'A Review of Trinitarianism, chiefly as it appears in the writings of Bull, Waterland, Sherlock, Howe, Newman, Coleridge, Wallis, and Wardlaw,’ Lond. 1847. 2. 'Leaves from my Writing Desk, being tracts on the question, What do we Know? By an Old Student,’ 1872 (anon.) He left manuscript essays on 'Idealism and Scepticism,’ and on 'Final Causes.'
