= Mary Carpenter =

English educational and social reformer (1807–1877)

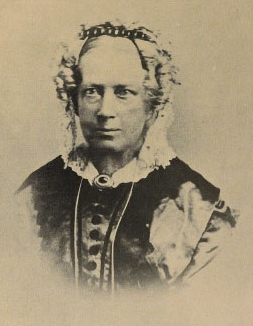
- Portrait photograph of Carpenter in later life
- Born: 3 April 1807; Exeter, Devon, England
- Died: 14 June 1877 (aged 70); Bristol, England
- Resting place: Arnos Vale Cemetery, Bristol; 51°26′24″N 2°34′03″W
- Years active: 1835–1877
- Known for: Education, Social reform
- Parents: Lant Carpenter (father); Anna Penn (mother)
- Relatives: William Benjamin Carpenter (brother); Philip Pearsall Carpenter (brother); Russell Lant Carpenter (brother)

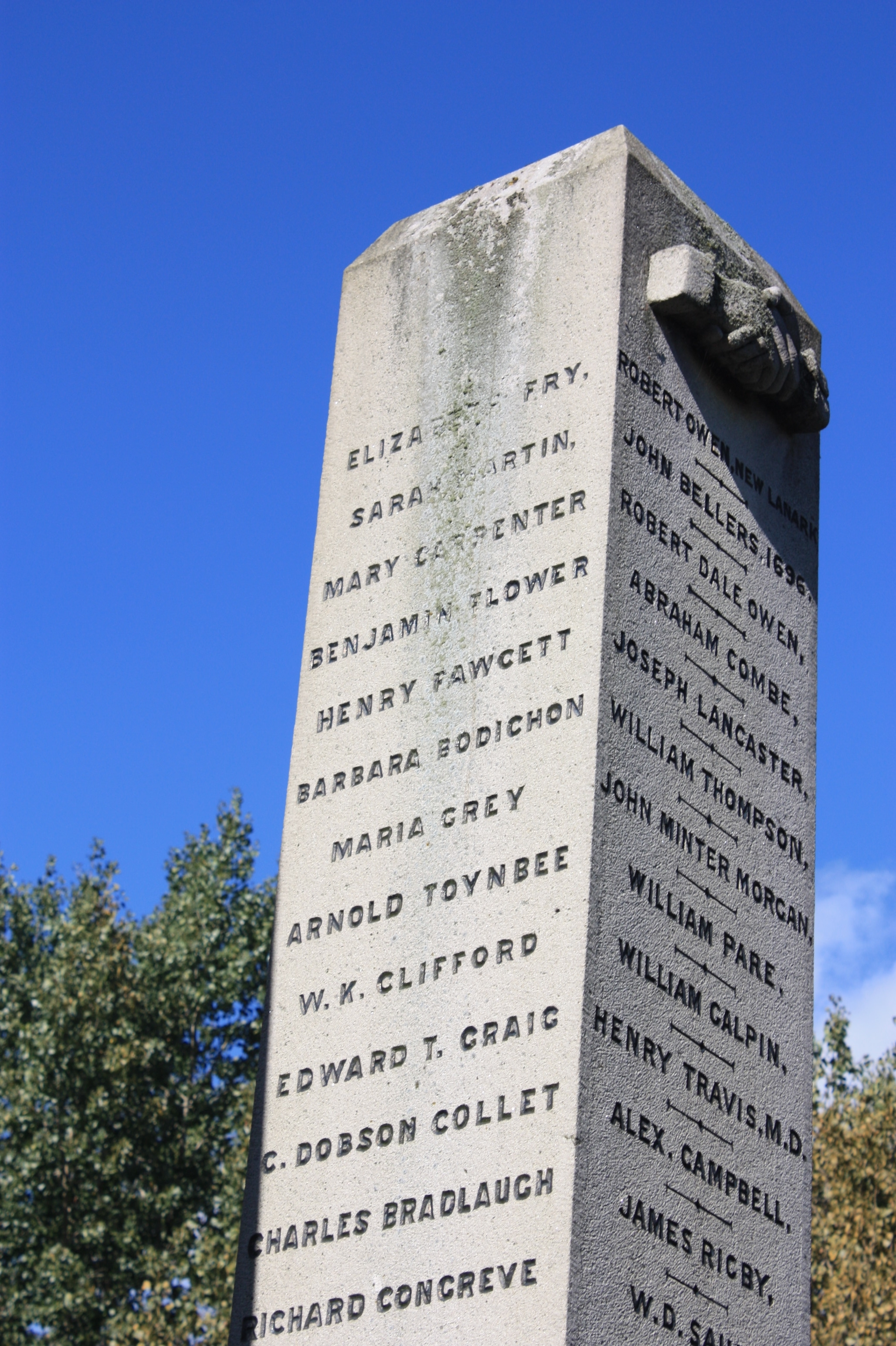
Mary Carpenter's name on the Reformers’ Monument, Kensal Green Cemetery

Mary Carpenter (3 April 1807 – 14 June 1877) was an English educational and social reformer. The daughter of a Unitarian minister, she founded a ragged school and reformatories, bringing previously unavailable educational opportunities to poor children and young offenders in Bristol.

She published articles and books on her work and her lobbying played a role in the passage of several educational acts in the mid-nineteenth century. She was also the first woman to have a paper published by the Statistical Society of London. She addressed many conferences and meetings and became known as one of the foremost public speakers of her time. Carpenter was active in the anti-slavery movement; she also visited India, visiting schools and prisons and working to improve female education, establish reformatory schools and improve prison conditions. In later years she visited Europe and America, carrying on her campaigns of penal and educational reform.

Carpenter publicly supported women's suffrage in her later years and also campaigned for female access to higher education. She is buried in Arnos Vale Cemetery in Bristol and has a memorial in the North transept of Bristol Cathedral.

== Early life ==
Carpenter was born on 3 April 1807, in Exeter, the first child of Lant Carpenter, a Unitarian minister in Exeter, and Anna (or Hannah) Penn. In 1817, the family moved to Bristol, where her father took charge of the Lewin's Mead Unitarian meeting house. He established a boarding school at Great George Street, Brandon Hill, which was run by his wife and daughters, where Mary studied the sciences, mathematics, Greek and Latin. She taught in the school, had spells as a governess in the Isle of Wight and Hertfordshire and, in 1827, returned to Bristol to become head teacher at what had by now become Mrs Carpenter's Boarding School for Young Ladies.

In 1833, she met Ram Mohan Roy, a founder of the Brahmo Samaj movement which reformed social Hinduism, and was influenced by his philosophy during his short stay with Miss Castle and Miss Kiddel at Beech House in Stapleton before Roy died of meningitis in September of that year. Later that year she also met Joseph Tuckerman, an American Unitarian who had founded the Ministry-at-Large to the Poor in Boston, Massachusetts. He is said to have directly inspired her start on the path of social reform, partly by a chance remark made when walking with Carpenter through a slum district of Bristol. A small boy in rags ran across their path and Tuckerman remarked, "That child should be followed to his home and seen after." He had established a Farm School in Massachusetts, which became the model for later reformatories. Carpenter's later writings are based upon ideas she developed from her correspondence with Tuckerman.

== Social work and anti-slavery ==
In 1835 she helped organise a "Working and Visiting Society", in the slums around Lewin's Mead, of which she remained secretary for nearly twenty years. This group was inspired by Tuckerman's work in Boston. The purposes of such societies were to visit the poor and raise funds from the emerging middle classes to alleviate poverty and improve education. After her father's death in 1840, Carpenter worked with her sisters in her mother's boarding school in Whiteladies Road, Clifton.

In 1843, her interest in the anti-slavery movement was aroused by a visit from Boston philanthropist Samuel May. In 1846 she attended a meeting which was addressed by prominent abolitionist William Lloyd Garrison and Frederick Douglass, who had escaped from slavery in 1838. She contributed to fund-raising efforts in the abolitionist cause and maintained an interest in this for the next twenty years. Her brothers William, Philip and Russell and her sister Anna were also active in this campaign. In 1851 the return of a fugitive slave from Boston back to the southern states caused her to say of the Fugitive Slave Law of 1850 that the United States had "committed an atrocious act ... against humanity, against itself, against God." This event caused her to concentrate on her educational work.

A bill had been introduced into Parliament "to make provision for the better education of children in manufacturing districts", but it failed to pass due to nonconformist opposition as it was seen to give pre-eminence to the position of the Church of England. As a result of the failure of the bill, ragged schools sprang up in many English towns, providing education, food and clothing to the poor, and prompting Carpenter to start such a school herself in Lewin's Mead, Bristol. A night school for adults soon followed. In 1848 the closure of the Carpenters' private school gave her more time for educational and charity work. She published a memoir of Joseph Tuckerman and a series of articles on ragged schools which were published in The Inquirer, an English Unitarian newspaper, and later published in book form.

== Reformatories ==
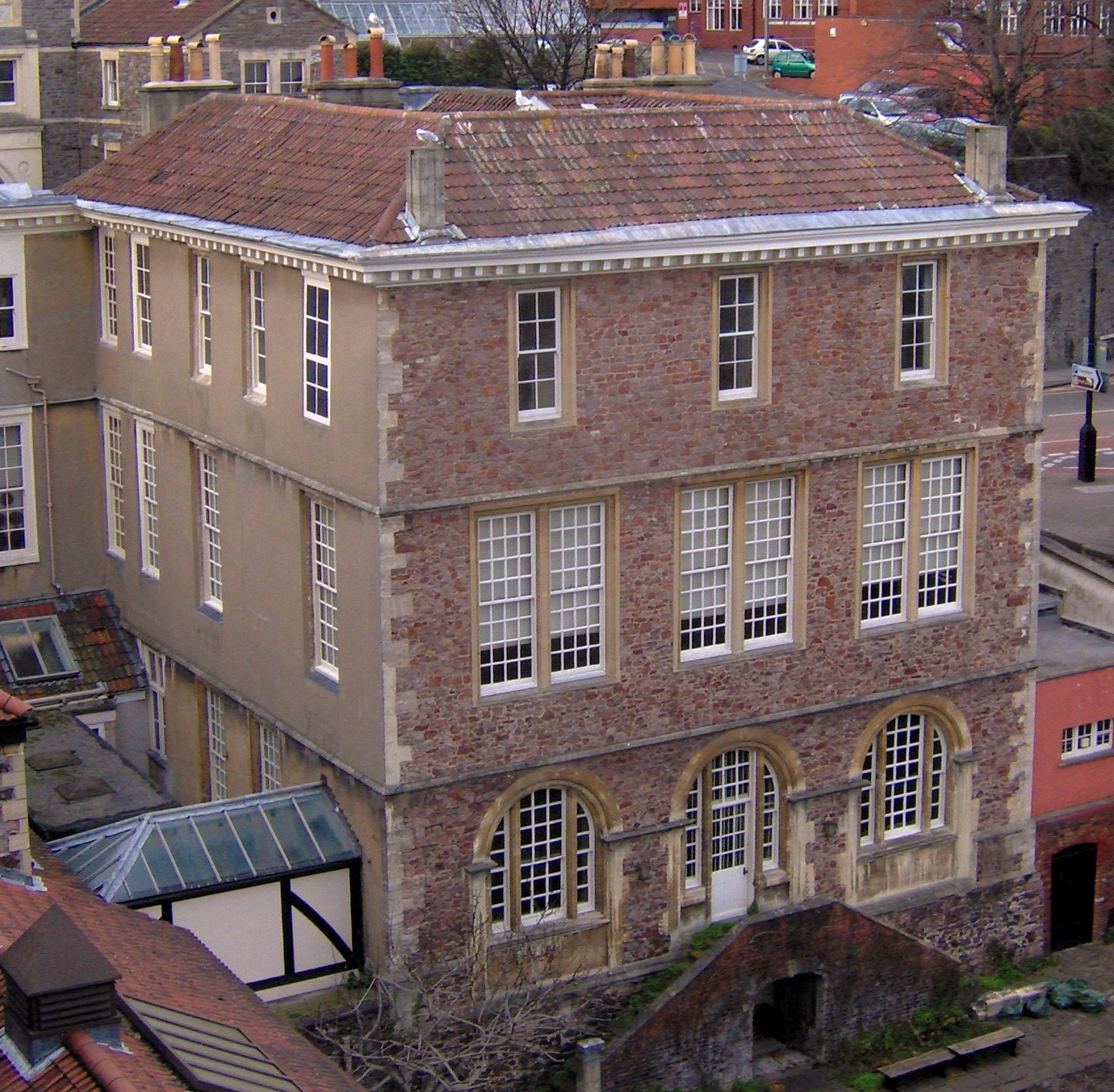
The Red Lodge, Bristol, where Mary Carpenter established a reformatory school in 1854

This was followed in 1851 by the publication of Reformatory Schools for the Children of the Perishing and Dangerous Classes, and for Juvenile Offenders. She sketched out three classes of schools as urgently needed; good free day schools (for the children in the general population), feeding industrial schools (for children in need) and reformatory schools (for young offenders). This book drew public attention to her work, and she began to communicate with leading educational and reformist thinkers and reformers. Carpenter was consulted by those drafting educational bills, and she was invited to give evidence before House of Commons committees and in 1852 she published Juvenile Delinquents, their Condition and Treatment, which contributed to the passing of the Juvenile Offenders Act in 1854.

In 1852 she put her ideas into practice, establishing a reformatory school at Bristol in 1852, in Kingswood in the premises of a school which had originally been set by John Wesley. Originally this was for boys and girls, but she soon decided to separate the sexes and set up a girls' reformatory in what is now the Red Lodge Museum in 1854, initially funded by Lady Byron.

=== Red Lodge Reformatory ===
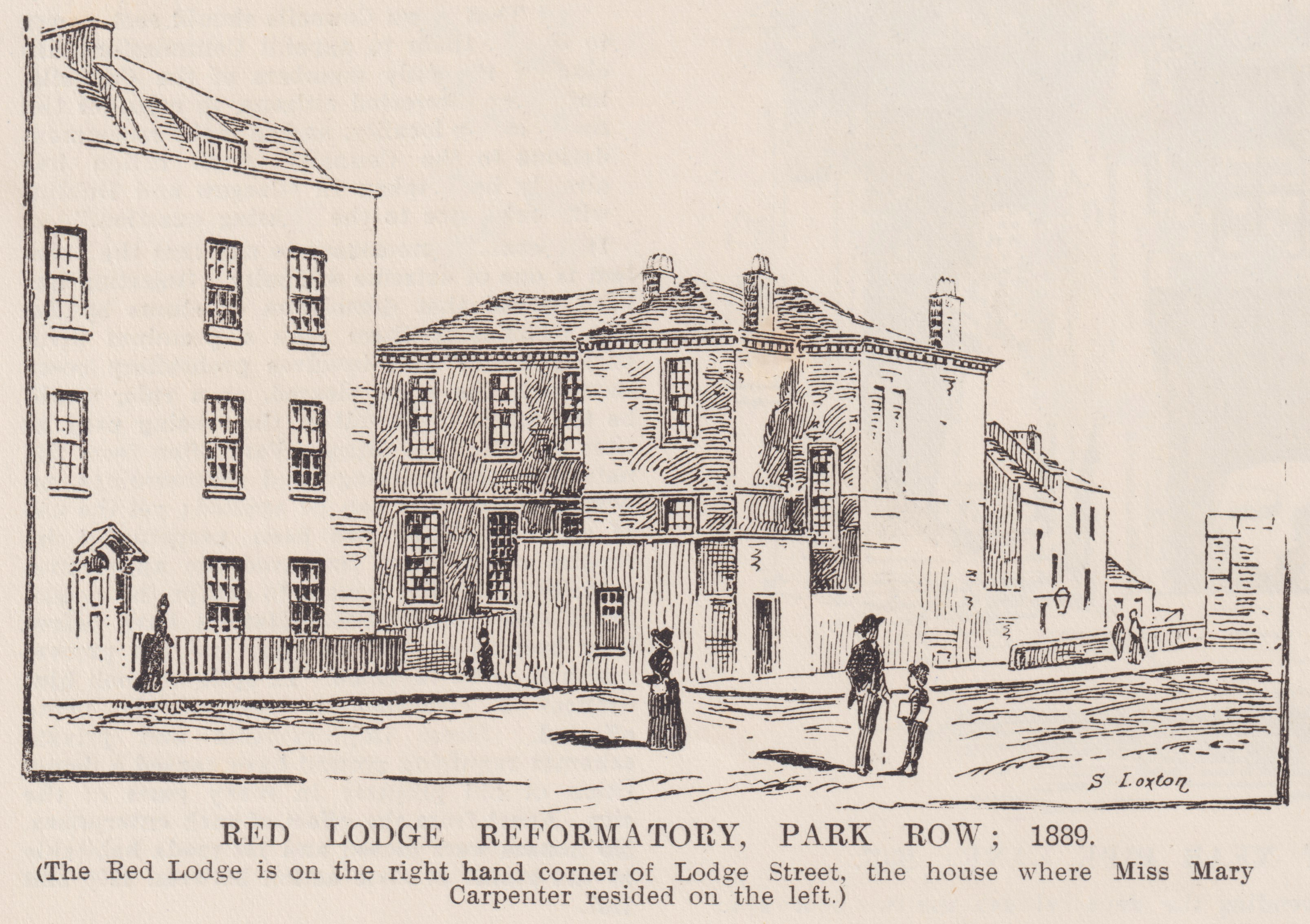
Red Lodge Reformatory, 1889

When Lady Byron died in 1860, Mary Carpenter was given a legacy to outright purchase the Red Lodge, including a cottage to be used for training the girls in domestic service. Mary Carpenter's detailed diaries (Ref. 12693/1-2) (online catalogue) present the earliest days at the Red Lodge transforming it from deserted house into functional school, including the discovery of a human foot in an outhouse. Carpenter's diaries also reveal the use of 'the cells' located in the cellar of the Red Lodge for disciplining "violent, refractory and noisy girls". Other punishments included caning and having their hair cut very short.

The famous anti-vivisectionist, Frances Power Cobbe worked at the Red Lodge and lived with Mary Carpenter from 1858 to 1859, but a turbulent relationship between the two meant that Cobbe left the school.

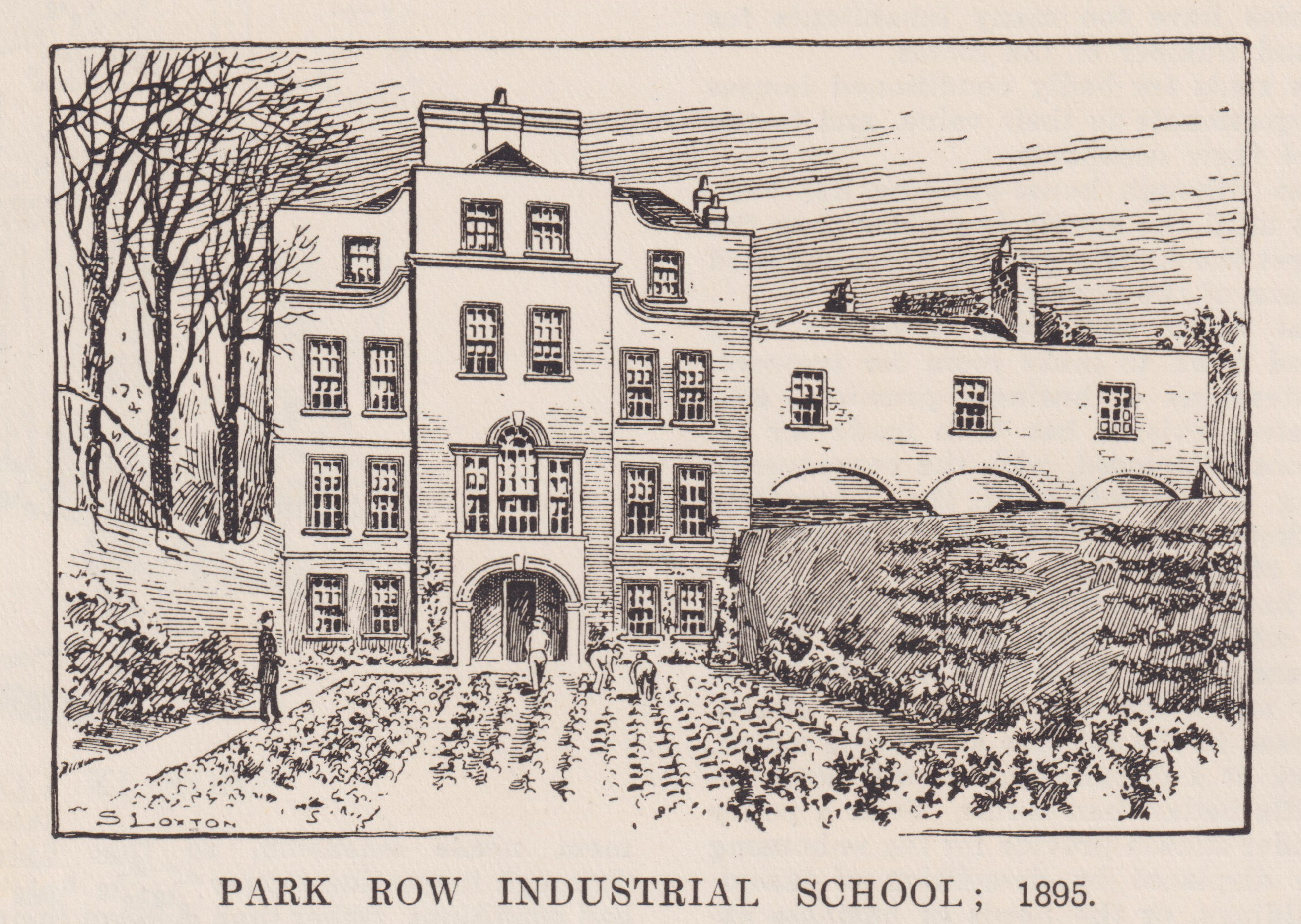
Park Row Industrial School,1895

In 1858 Carpenter also established a reformatory for boys, called the Park Row Industrial School in Bristol, which was the first certified institution of its kind to be founded in England following the passing of the Industrial Schools Act (1857).

Her strong religious beliefs drove her reforms. "Love must be the ruling sentiment of all who attempt to influence and guide these children", she wrote in Reformatory Schools for the Children of the Perishing and Dangerous Classes, and for Juvenile Offenders. Now that the principle of reformatory schools was established, Carpenter agitated for free day schools, arguing the ragged schools were entitled to financial aid from the government. At the 1860 Oxford meeting, she became the first women to read a paper at a British Association meeting, addressing this subject, and, mainly owing to her instigation, a conference on ragged schools in relation to government grants for education was held at Birmingham in 1861.

In the same year, Carpenter was invited to give evidence to the House of Commons Select Committee on the Education of Destitute Children. Amongst other evidence she criticised Catholic priests who warned young children of Irish immigrants from attending her ragged school. She condemned the "low Anglo Irish" as combining "the vices of the English in a large commercial town with their ... natural character in a very undesirable way."

She further said, "I can only say that the children told us that the priests had in one case flogged a child for coming to our school, and had used very strong influence to prevent them from coming, and that I have myself been absolutely insulted in the street by Catholic children ... who feel erroneously that they were showing their zeal for their own religion by insulting Protestants."

== India ==
In 1866 Carpenter visited India, which had been an ambition of hers since her meeting with Raja Ram Mohan Roy in 1833. She visited Calcutta, Madras and Bombay, finding that for the most part girls were not educated past the age of twelve years, mainly due to a lack of educated female teachers. During her visit Carpenter met Keshab Chandra Sen, the leader of Brahmo Samaj. Sen asked her to form an organisation in Britain to improve communication between British and Indian reformers, which she did in 1870, establishing the National Indian Association. She visited many schools, hospitals and gaols and encouraged both Indian and British colonial administrators to improve and fund these. She was particularly concerned that the lack of good female education led to a shortage of women teachers, nurses and prison attendants. The Mary Carpenter Hall at the Brahmo Girls school in Calcutta was erected as a memorial to this work.

She also participated in the inauguration of the Bengal Social Science Association, and addressed a paper to the governor-general on proposals for female education, reformatory schools and improving the conditions of gaols. She returned to India in 1868 and achieved funding to set up a Normal School to educate female Indian teachers. In 1875 she made a final visit and was able to see many of her schemes in operation. She also presented proposals to for Indian prison reform to the Secretary of the Indian Government.

== Europe and America ==
At the International Penal and Prison Congress in 1872 Carpenter read a paper on The Principles and Results of the English Reformatory and Certified Industrial Schools. She read forty papers at conferences of the National Association for the Promotion of Social Science between the years of 1857 and 1746, gave many public lectures and was known as one of the most prominent speakers on social reform in an era when few women ever addressed public meetings.

Carpenter's work now began to attract attention in Europe and further afield. Not all of such attention was favourable, Pope Pius IX condemned her books and her work in 1864. Princess Alice of Hesse, who had become interested in social reform, invited her, along with Catherine Winkworth, to Darmstadt to help organise a Congress of Women Workers in 1872. This meeting resolved to work towards a "better preparation for domestic life" and "to pay greater attention to the mental development of an interest in the practical problems of life." At the conclusion of the meeting Carpenter proposed the establishment of an International Union for the Industrial Education of Women. She went on to Neuchâtel, Switzerland to study Louis Guillaume's prison system, and in 1873 to America, where she met abolitionists such as William Lloyd Garrison and Frederick Douglass. She visited prisons and in 1874 wrote to the New York Prison Association to express her concern about "the dreadful state of the Prisons".

== Later life ==
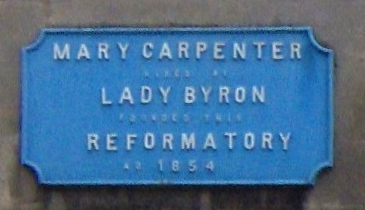
Blue plaque on the Red Lodge, Bristol.

Carpenter supported the movement for the higher education of women, and had always supported the feminist cause but for most of her life would not do so publicly, believing that the unpopularity of the movement for women's suffrage might damage her educational and penal reforms. She did though in 1877, the year of her death, appear on a public platform in Bristol, supporting the Bristol and West of England Society for Women’s Suffrage. She was invited for an interview with Queen Victoria and Florence Nightingale at Windsor Castle in 1868.

Carpenter never married, but she did adopt a five-year-old girl, Rosanna in 1858. She died, in her sleep, at the Red Lodge in June 1877 and was buried at Arnos Vale Cemetery. Her funeral cortège was half a mile long. A public meeting in October 1877 raised £2,700 to be spent on her reform schools and a memorial in Bristol Cathedral.

== Legacy ==
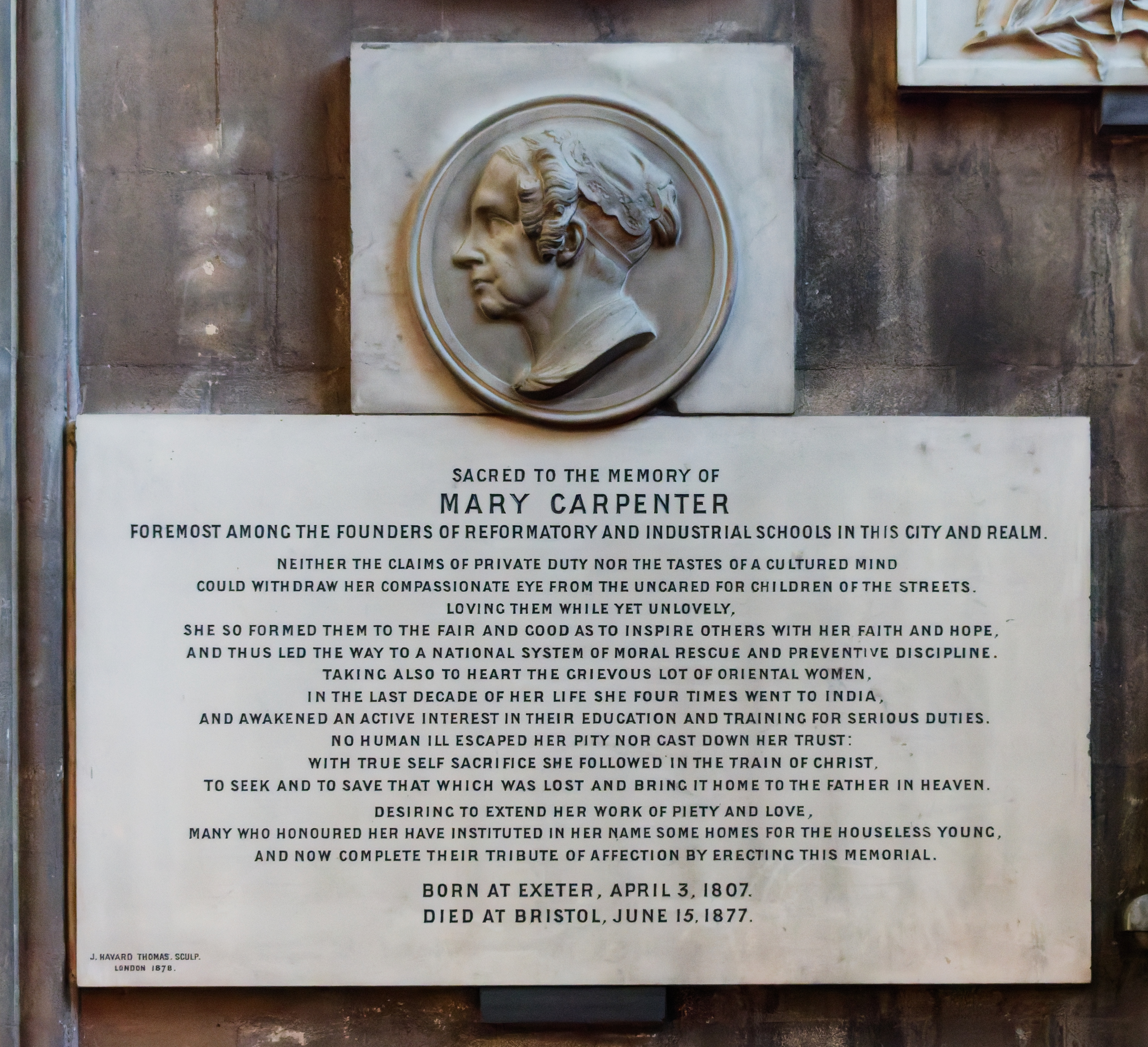
Monument to Mary Carpenter by J. Havard Thomas, north transept, Bristol Cathedral.

The reformatory school in Kingswood was active until 1984 and the Red Lodge Girls' Reformatory closed in 1918. Carpenter's campaigns for juvenile penal reform had a major influence on the development of a more enlightened regime for dealing with young offenders. Her writings, political activism and public addresses had a major influence on correctional education in Britain, Europe, India and America and helped bring about major reforms in the 19th and 20th century. However, many of the causes of youth crime apparently remain unaddressed in the early 21st century and failures in contemporary youth jails have been criticised by official bodies.

== Works ==
- Morning and Evening Meditations, for Every Day in a Month. Boston: Wm. Crosby & H. P. Nichols, 1848
- Memoir of Joseph Tuckerman, D.D., of Boston (U.S.). London: Christian Tract Society, 1849
- Reformatory Schools: For the Children of the Perishing and Dangerous Classes and for Juvenile Offenders. London: C. Gilpin, 1851
- Juvenile Delinquents, their Condition and Treatment. London: W. & F. G. Cash, 1853
- Reformatories for Convicted Girls. Transactions of the National Association for the Promotion of Social Science, pp. 338–346, 1860
- Six Months in India. London: Longmans, Green and Co, 1868
- Female Life in Prison with Robinson, Frederick William. London: Hurst and Blackett, 1862
- Our Convicts. London: Longman, Green, Longman, Roberts & Green, 1864
- The Last Days in England of the Rajah Rammohun Roy. London: Trubner and Co, 1866
- Reformatory Prison Discipline: As Developed by the Rt. Hon. Sir Walter Crofton, in the Irish Convict Prisons with Crofton, William. London: Longmans, Green and Co, 1872
- Memoir of the Rev. Lant Carpenter, LL.D. with Russell Lant Carpenter. London: E.T. Whitfield, 1875
- An address on prison discipline and juvenile reformatories. W. Jones, 1876

== Personal papers ==
Papers and correspondence of Mary Carpenter, the Red Lodge Reformatory, and the Kingswood Reformatory are held by Bristol Archives (Ref. 12693) (online catalogue). Records relating to Mary Carpenter can also be found at Boston Public Library, Dorset History Centre, Oxford University: Tate Library, Huntington Library and the British Library Manuscript Collections.

== See also ==
- Education reform
- Prison reform
- Social reform

== Sources ==
- Gordon, Alexander (1887). "Carpenter, Mary" . In Stephen, Leslie (ed.). Dictionary of National Biography. Vol. 9. London: Smith, Elder & Co.
- Prochaska, Frank. "Carpenter, Mary (1807–1877)". Oxford Dictionary of National Biography (online ed.). Oxford University Press. doi:10.1093/ref:odnb/4733. (Subscription, Wikipedia Library access or UK public library membership required.)
- Saywell, Ruby J., Mary Carpenter of Bristol (Bristol Historical Association pamphlets, no. 9, 1964)
- Zimmern, Alice Louisa Theodora (1911). "Carpenter, Mary" . In Chisholm, Hugh (ed.). Encyclopædia Britannica. Vol. 5 (11th ed.). Cambridge University Press. p. 385.
