= Lant Carpenter =

English educator and Unitarian minister (1780–1840)

The Reverend Lant Carpenter
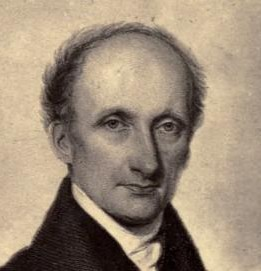
- Born: 2 September 1780; Kidderminster, England
- Died: 5 April 1840 (aged 59) at sea, en route to Marseille
- Years active: 1799–1840
- Known for: Educator and Unitarian minister
- Parent(s): George Carpenter, Mary Hooke
- Relatives: Mary Carpenter (daughter); William Benjamin Carpenter (son); Russell Lant Carpenter (son); Philip Pearsall Carpenter (son)

Signature
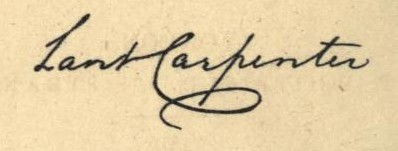

Lant Carpenter (2 September 1780 – 5 or 6 April 1840) was an English educator and Unitarian minister.

== Early life ==
Lant Carpenter was born in Kidderminster, the third son of George Carpenter and his wife Mary (Hooke). He was christened on 2 September 1780 in Kidderminster. His parents separated after his father's business failed, and Nicholas Pearsall, his mother's guardian and a Unitarian, saw to his education. For two years from age 13 he was at Stourbridge, taught by his uncle the Rev. Benjamin Carpenter, then returned to Kidderminster where he was at a school founded by Pearsall, and was taught by William Blake. After some months at Northampton Academy under John Horsey, Carpenter transferred to the University of Glasgow and then joined the ministry. After a short time as assistant master at a Unitarian school near Birmingham, in 1802 he was appointed librarian at the Liverpool Athenaeum.

== Minister ==
In 1805 Carpenter became pastor of a chapel in Exeter. He moved to Bristol in 1817, to take up a post as minister at the Unitarian chapel in Lewin's Mead. At both Bristol and Exeter he was also engaged in school work, among his Bristol pupils being Harriet and James Martineau, Samuel Greg, and the Westminster Review's John Bowring.

Lant Carpenter did much to broaden the spirit of English Unitarianism. He believed in the essential lawfulness of the creation. This meant that natural causes were the explanation of the world as we find it. The rite of baptism seemed to him a superstition and he substituted for it a form of infant dedication.

== Last years ==
Carpenter's health broke down in 1839 and he was ordered to travel. He drowned on 5 or 6 April 1840, having been washed overboard from the steamer in which he was travelling from Livorno to Marseille. His body washed ashore about two months later near the Porto d'Anzio and was buried on the beach.

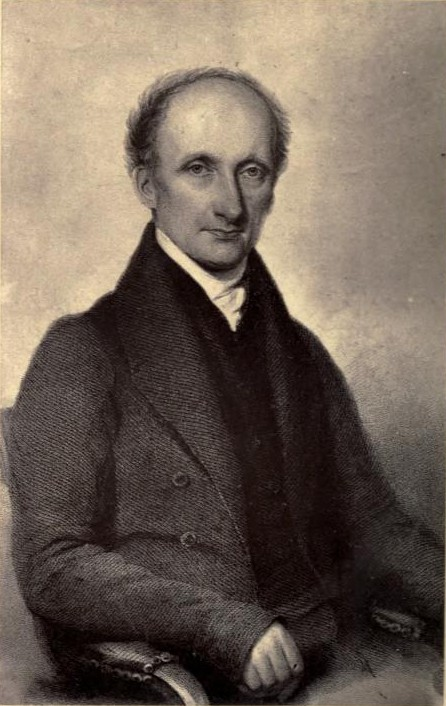
Lant Carpenter

== Works ==
In 1820, Carpenter authored An Examination of the Charges Made Against Unitarians and Unitarianism. A collection of his sermons were published in 1840 as Sermons on Practical Subjects. For Rees's Cyclopædia he contributed the articles on Education, Volume 12, (1809); Language, Volume 20, (1812); and Mental & Moral Philosophy, Volume 23, (1812/13).

Bibliography

- 1806: Lant Carpenter, An Introduction to the Geography of the New Testament: He brought out in 1806 a popular manual of New Testament geography. (Levant map, p. PA4, at Google Books)
- 1819: George Paxton (Rev), Illustrations of the Holy Scriptures: in three Parts.
  1. From the Geography of the East.
  2. From the Natural History of the East.
  3. From the Customs of Ancient and Modern Nations.
  sup. An Introduction to the Geography of the New Testament: Comprising a Geographical Arrangement of the Places Mentioned in the New Testament; With a Brief Statement of the Connexion in Which They Respectively Occur. With Several Maps. By Lant Carpenter, LL. D. [Printed To Accompany Paxton's "Illustrations Of The Holy Scriptures."] (Title image) (Levant map, p. RA1-PA51, at Google Books)

== Family ==
Lant Carpenter married Anna or Hannah Penn, daughter of John Penn and Mary, in 1806 in Worcester. Anna was christened on 11 May 1787 in Bromsgrove, Worcester.

Their marriage had the following issue:

1. Mary Carpenter was born on 3 April 1807 in Exeter. She died on 14 June 1877 and was buried in Arno's Vale, Bristol. Mary was founder of the ragged school movement.
2. Anna Carpenter, born 17 September 1808.
3. Susan Carpenter, born 19 April 1811.
4. William Benjamin Carpenter was born on 29 October 1813 in Exeter. He died on 19 November 1885 in London, and was buried in Highgate Cemetery.
5. Russell Lant Carpenter was born in 1816 in Kidderminster and was christened in Devonshire. He died in 1892.
6. Philip Pearsall Carpenter was born on 4 November 1819 in Bristol, Somerset, England. He died on 24 May 1877 in Montreal, Quebec, Canada, of typhoid fever. He was an ordained minister and a noted conchologist.

== Misquotations ==
"The wise and active conquer difficulties
By daring to attempt them. Sloth and Folly
shiver and shrink at the sight of toil and danger,
And make the impossibilities they fear."

Lant Carpenter, about 1800, from page 14, Memoirs of the Life of Rev. Lant Carpenter, LL.D.

Note: This quotation has been incorrectly attributed as by Lant Carpenter, but from the source shown above it states that it was said to Lant Carpenter by a friend. The quotation is originally from a play written in 1700 by Nicholas Rowe and called "The Ambitious Step-mother" and is from Act 1, Scene 1.
