= Carpenter House =

Carpenter House may refer to:

in Switzerland

- The Zimmermannhaus (Carpenter House) in Brugg, Switzerland, a heritage site of national significance

in the United States (by state then city)

- Capt. Nathan Carpenter House, Eutaw, Alabama, listed on the National Register of Historic Places (NRHP)
- Sumner-Carpenter House, Eastford, Connecticut, NRHP-listed
- Carpenter House (Norwich, Connecticut), NRHP-listed
- Joseph Carpenter Silversmith Shop, Norwichtown, Connecticut, a house and shop listed on the NRHP
- Carpenter-Lippincott House, Centreville, Delaware, NRHP-listed
- Reid-Jones-Carpenter House, Augusta, Georgia, NRHP-listed
- Willard Carpenter House, Evansville, Indiana, NRHP-listed
- James Sansom Carpenter House, Des Moines, Iowa, NRHP-listed
- Carpenter House (Clark Station, Kentucky), NRHP-listed
- Carpenter-Smith House, Crestwood, Kentucky, NRHP-listed
- Carpenter House (Richland Parish, Louisiana), a historic stagecoach inn
- Ezra Carpenter House, Foxborough, Massachusetts, NRHP-listed
- Christopher Carpenter House, Rehoboth, Massachusetts, NRHP-listed
- Col. Thomas Carpenter III House, Rehoboth, Massachusetts, NRHP-listed
- Carpenter House (Rehoboth, Massachusetts), NRHP-listed
- Carpenter Homestead, Seekonk, Massachusetts, NRHP-listed
- George Carpenter House, Uxbridge, Massachusetts, NRHP-listed
- David Carpenter House, Blissfield, Michigan, NRHP-listed
- Elbert L. Carpenter House, Minneapolis, Minnesota, NRHP-listed
- Eugene J. Carpenter House, Minneapolis, Minnesota, NRHP-listed
- Eddie Eugene and Harriet Cotton Carpenter Farmstead, Lowell, Nebraska, listed on the NRHP in Kearney County, Nebraska
- Frank Pierce Carpenter House, Manchester, New Hampshire, NRHP-listed
- John B. Carpenter House, Plattsburgh, New York, NRHP-listed
- Theodore Carpenter House, Mount Kisco, New York
- Carpenter House (Valhalla, New York)
- Stallings-Carpenter House, Clayton, North Carolina, NRHP-listed
- Andrew Carpenter House, Lucia, North Carolina, NRHP-listed
- Wallace W. Carpenter House, Granville, Ohio, listed on the NRHP in Licking County, Ohio
- Joseph Carpenter House, Stroud, Oklahoma, NRHP-listed
- A. S. V. Carpenter and Helen Bundy House, Central Point, Oregon, listed on the NRHP in Jackson County Oregon
- Samuel Carpenter's "Slate Roof House", Philadelphia, Pennsylvania
- Carpenter House (Plano, Texas), a historic house in Collin County, Texas
- Miles B. Carpenter House, Waverly, Virginia, NRHP-listed
- Michael Carpenter House, Milwaukee, Wisconsin, listed on the NRHP in Wisconsin

Related names

- Carpenter's Rock House, a large rock shelter in Wayne County, Kentucky, named for Benjamin Carpenter, an American Revolutionary War soldier
- Carpenter's Coffee House (later known as "The Finish", "The Queen's Head" and "Jack's"), a coffee house in Covent Garden, London, England
- The House Carpenter's Daughter, a folk album by Natalie Merchant

== See also ==
- Carpenter (surname)
- List of people with surname Carpenter
