= Carpenter School =

Carpenter School may refer to:

in Canada

- Carpenter High School (Meadow Lake, Saskatchewan)

in the United States (by city then state)

- Carpenter School No. 1, in Natchez, Mississippi, one of two Carpenter Schools
- Carpenter School No. 2, in Natchez, Mississippi, second of two Carpenter Schools
- Carpenter Middle School (Plano, Texas)
- Carpenter High School (Carpenter, Wyoming)

== See also ==
- Carpenter House (disambiguation)
