= 1790–1792 United States House of Representatives elections in Massachusetts =

United States House of Representatives elections in Massachusetts, 1790–1792
- October 4, 1790 - April 2, 1792

All 8 Massachusetts seats to the United States House of Representatives
	Majority party	Minority party
Party	Pro-Administration	Anti-Administration
Last election	6	2
Seats won	7	1
Seat change	▲1	▼1

Elections for the United States House of Representatives for the 2nd Congress were held in Massachusetts beginning October 4, 1790, with subsequent elections held in four districts due to a majority not being achieved on the first ballot.

== Background ==
In the previous election, 6 Pro-Administration and 2 Anti-Administration Representatives had been elected. One representative, George Partridge (P) of the 5th district resigned August 14, 1790. His seat was vacant at the time of the 1790 elections, so that there were 5 Pro-Administration and 2 Anti-Administration incumbents, all of whom ran for re-election.

Three candidates ran in districts with different numbers from the previous election. It is not clear from the source used whether there was redistricting or if the districts had simply been renumbered.

Massachusetts law at the time required a majority for election. This occurred on the first ballot in the 1st, 2nd, 3rd and 4th districts. In the remaining four districts additional elections were required. In the 5th and 7th districts, a majority was achieved on the 2nd ballot. In the 8th district, a majority was achieved on the 4th ballot, while in the 6th district, 9 ballots were required.

== First Ballot ==
The first ballot was held on October 4, 1790. Four representatives, from the 1st, 2nd, 3rd, and 4th districts won on the first ballot.

1790 United States House election results
District	Pro-Administration			Anti-Administration			Unknown Party Affiliation		
1st	Fisher Ames (I)	1,850	75.1%				Benjamin Austin	397	16.1%
1st							Thomas Dawes	218	8.8%
2nd	Benjamin Goodhue (I)	1,027	88.8%				Samuel Holten	129	11.2%
3rd				Elbridge Gerry (I)	1,067	60.4%	Nathaniel Gorham	699	39.6%
4th	Theodore Sedgwick (I)	2,241	75.0%				Scattering	259	8.7%
4th	Samuel Lyman	487	16.3%						
5th	Shearjashub Bourne	298	41.8%				Thomas Davis	266	37.3%
5th							Joshua Thomas	149	20.9%
6th	George Leonard (I)	327	22.3%	Phanuel Bishop	331	22.6%	Walter Spooner	374	25.5%
6th	Peleg Coffin, Jr.	245	16.7%						
6th	David Cobb	189	12.9%						
7th	Artemas Ward	798	39.0%	Jonathan Grout (I)	800	39.1%	John Sprague	297	14.5%
7th							Nathan Tyler	151	7.4%
8th	George Thatcher (I)	609	37.2%				Josiah Thatcher	450	9.2%
8th	Peleg Wadsworth	25	1.5%				William Lithgow	364	22.3%
8th							Nathaniel Wells	263	16.1%
8th							William Martin	80	4.9%
8th							Arthur Noble	59	3.6%
8th							Daniel Davis	29	1.8%
8th							Scattering	57	3.5%

== Second ballot ==
The second ballot was held in the 5th, 6th, 7th, and 8th districts on November 26, 1790. A majority was achieved in the 5th and 7th districts on the second ballot

1790 United States House election results (2nd ballot)
District	Pro-Administration			Anti-Administration			Unknown Party Affiliation		
5th	Shearjashub Bourne	667	65.3%				Joshua Thomas	278	27.2%
5th							Thomas Davis	77	7.5%
6th	Peleg Coffin, Jr.	402	25.7%%	Phanuel Bishop	444	28.4%	Walter Spooner	387	24.8%
6th	George Leonard (I)	196	12.5%						
6th	David Cobb	134	8.6%						
7th	Artemas Ward	1,248	56.6%	Jonathan Grout (I)	1,081	43.4%			
8th	George Thatcher (I)	421	49.8%				Nathaniel Wells	262	31.0%
8th							William Lithgow	125	14.8%
8th							Scattering	37	4.4%

== Third ballot ==
The third ballot was held in the 6th and 8th districts on January 25, 1791. Neither district achieved a majority on this ballot.

1791 United States House election results (3rd ballot)
District	Pro-Administration			Anti-Administration			Unknown Party Affiliation		
6th	Peleg Coffin, Jr.	603	24.0%	Phanuel Bishop	852	33.9%	Walter Spooner	711	28.3%
6th	George Leonard (I)	213	8.5%						
6th	David Cobb	134	5.3%						
8th	George Thatcher (I)	1,137	49.1%				William Lithgow	919	39.7%
8th							Nathaniel Wells	259	11.2%

== Fourth ballot ==
The fourth ballot was held in the 6th and 8th districts on April 4, 1791. A majority was achieved in the 8th district.

1791 United States House election results (4th ballot)
District	Pro-Administration			Anti-Administration			Unknown Party Affiliation		
6th	Peleg Coffin, Jr.	420	15.7%	Phanuel Bishop	1,039	38.8%	Walter Spooner	1,038	38.8%
6th	George Leonard (I)	143	5.3%						
6th	David Cobb	39	1.5%						
8th	George Thatcher (I)	2,738	52.3%				William Lithgow	2,155	41.1%
8th							Nathaniel Wells	347	6.6%

== Fifth ballot ==
The fifth ballot was held in the 6th district on September 8, 1791. A majority was not achieved. This was the last ballot before the first session of the 2nd Congress began on October 24, 1791. The 6th district was still vacant at the start of the 1st session.

1791 United States House election results (5th ballot)
District	Pro-Administration			Anti-Administration			Unknown Party Affiliation		
6th	George Leonard (I)	555	29.3%	Phanuel Bishop	801	42.3%	Walter Spooner	124	6.6%
6th	Peleg Coffin, Jr.	412	21.8%						

== Sixth ballot ==
The sixth ballot was held in the 6th district on November 11, 1791. A majority was not achieved.

1791 United States House election results (6th ballot)
District	Pro-Administration			Anti-Administration		
6th	George Leonard (I)	795	41.6%	Phanuel Bishop	806	42.2%
6th	Peleg Coffin, Jr.	310	16.2%			

== Seventh ballot ==
The seventh ballot was held in the 6th district on December 26, 1791. A majority was not achieved.

1791 United States House election results (7th ballot)
District	Pro-Administration			Anti-Administration		
6th	George Leonard (I)	983	45.6%	Phanuel Bishop	689	32.0%
6th	Peleg Coffin, Jr.	484	22.5%			

== Eighth ballot ==
The eighth ballot was held in the 6th district on December 26, 1791, during the 1st session of the 2nd Congress.

1791 United States House election results (8th ballot)
District	Pro-Administration			Anti-Administration		
6th	George Leonard (I)	983	45.0%	Phanuel Bishop	690	31.6%
6th	Peleg Coffin, Jr.	484	22.2%			

== Ninth ballot ==
The ninth and final ballot was held in the 6th district on April 2, 1792, near the end of the 1st session of the 2nd Congress.

1792 United States House election results (8th ballot)
District	Pro-Administration			Anti-Administration		
6th	George Leonard (I)	1,161	55.6%	Phanuel Bishop	578	27.7%
6th	Peleg Coffin, Jr.	348	16.7%			

== See also ==
- 1790 and 1791 United States House of Representatives elections
