= Rehoboth Carpenter family =

American family that helped settle Rehoboth, Massachusetts

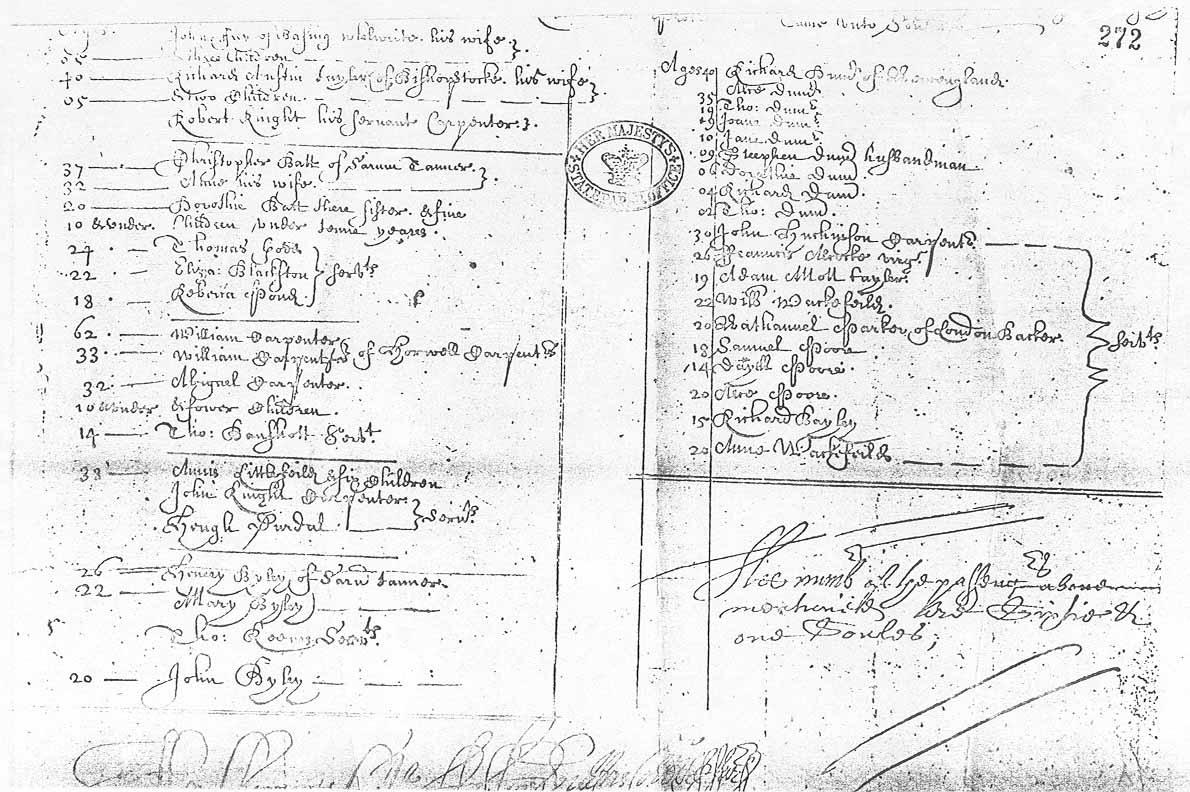
William Carpenter, the father, William Carpenter, the son, and the son's family on the passenger list of the sailing ship Bevis from 1638

The Rehoboth Carpenter family is an American family that helped settle the town of Rehoboth, Massachusetts in 1644.

== William Carpenter ==
The first immigrant and founder of this line was William Carpenter (generation 1) (b. c1575 in England), his namesake son, William Carpenter (Generation 2) (c. 1605 in England -1658/9 Rehoboth, Bristol, MA), and the son's wife and children (then numbering four) arrived on the Bevis from Southampton, England, in 1638. Nothing more is known of the father, William (Gen. 1), in Massachusetts and he is presumed to have perished either in passage, shortly after arriving in the new world or, less likely he returned to England. William Carpenter (Gen. 2) is buried in the Newman Congregational Church Cemetery with a simple field stone marked with a "W. C.".

William Carpenter, (Gen. 2) first appears in New England records in 1640, as a resident of Weymouth, Massachusetts. He was among the founders (at Weymouth in late 1643) of the Plymouth Colony town of Rehoboth (settled 1644). His son, William (Gen. 3) Carpenter (b. 1631 in England - 1702/3 Rehoboth, Bristol, Massachusetts), was for many years Rehoboth town clerk, by virtue of which his name—not that of his father—appears with some frequency in Plymouth Colony records, in association with a number of local vital-records lists that he certified and forwarded to colony authorities. The name William Carpenter appears in copious Plymouth Colony records and in the writings of John Winthrop and in other public records over the generations.

Three Carpenter family houses in Rehoboth are listed on the U.S. National Register of Historic Places: Christopher Carpenter House, Col. Thomas Carpenter III House, and Carpenter House.

== English ancestry ==
St. Michael and All Angels, Shalbourne

These Carpenters previously lived in Shalbourne, an English parish near Hungerford that straddled the boundary between Wiltshire and Berkshire. The Rehoboth Carpenters' English origins were obscure until the discovery of Bishops' Transcripts of Shalbourne parish records containing marriage, baptismal, and burial records pertaining to them. Among these records is that of William (Gen. 2, a.k.a. Senior) Carpenter's marriage in 1625 to Abigail Briant of Shalbourne. A search of Westcourt Manor tenants' records reveals William Carpenter (Gen. 1) as a copyholder at Westcourt Manor in Shalbourne from 1608 to late 1637.

== Immigrant family ==
William Carpenter (Gen. 1) born about 1575 in England. He died after 2 May 1638 (Bevis passenger list) and certainly before 1644 when his son, William settled in Rehoboth. He was of Newtown, Shalbourne Parish, Wiltshire, England, by 1608, when he became a copyholder (semipermanent leaseholder) at Westcourt Manor (Westcourt Recs 7). Shalbourne, completely in Wiltshire since 1895, previously it straddled the line separating Wiltshire and Berkshire, with Westcourt comprising the Wiltshire part of the parish (Shalbourne Map); the Hampshire border was/is about four miles away. It is likely that William was born in one of these three counties. William's renewal of his Westcourt tenancy on 22 June 1614 gives his age as 40 (Westcourt Recs 7). The passenger list of the Bevis, the ship on which he left England, is dated 2 May 1638 and states William's age as 62 leading to an estimate of about 1575 for his birth.

His son William Carpenter (Gen. 2) was born about 1605 in or of Wiltshire, England. He died 7 February 1658/1659 in Rehoboth, Bristol, Plymouth Colony. He married Abigail Briant, daughter of John & Alice, on 28 April 1625 in Shalbourne Parish, Berkshire, now in, Wiltshire, England.

Their children:

- John Carpenter - Christened 8 October 1626 in Shalborne Parish - Bevis passenger
- Abigail Carpenter - Chr. 31 May 1629 in Shalborne Parish - Bevis passenger
- William Carpenter (Gen. 3) - Chr. 22 November 1631 in Shalborne Parish - Bevis Passenger
- Joseph Carpenter - Chr. 6 April 1634 in Shalborne Parish - Bevis Passenger
- Samuel Carpenter - Chr. 1 March 1636/1637 d. 20 April 1637 both in Shalbourne Parish.
- Samuel Carpenter - b. abt. 1638 of, Weymouth, Norfolk, Massachusetts - his mother was probably pregnant on the Bevis
- Hannah Carpenter - b. 3 April 1640 Weymouth, Norfolk, Massachusetts
- Abiah Carpenter - b. 9 April 1643 of, Weymouth, Norfolk, Massachusetts

== Church ==
Newman Congregational Church and Carpenter graves

There is no record to confirm it, but it is said that certain Rehoboth Carpenters were among the founders of the Rehoboth (now Newman) Congregational Church (See: Newman Congregational Church and the Newman Cemetery)

This much we know: William (Gen. 2) Carpenter's admission as a Massachusetts Bay Colony freeman from Weymouth in 1640 required church membership. The minister at Weymouth was Rev. Samuel Newman, most of whose congregation accompanied him to Rehoboth, where he was also the minister. William (Gen. 2) Carpenter was one of Rehoboth's fifty-eight original proprietors and is buried in Old Rehoboth (Newman Church) Cemetery. (While records of the time provide no direct evidence as to the religious affiliation of William (Gen. 2) Carpenter of Rehoboth, he was certainly not a Baptist, even though other Carpenters in New England were. In this regard, he is sometimes confused with William Carpenter (Rhode Island colonist) of Providence and others.

== Notable Carpenters of the Rehoboth Carpenter family ==
Through his five sons, Capt. William Carpenter became known as the father of "The Family of Heroes." Over 300 of his male lineal descendants served America in the Revolutionary War, more than any other American family.

- Among the Rehoboth Carpenter descendants who fought in the American Revolutionary War was Captain Benajah Carpenter, a founding member of the United States Army Field Artillery Corps under Henry Knox.
- Thomas Carpenter III (October 24, 1733 – April 26, 1807), great-great-grandson of William Carpenter, was a Colonel in the Massachusetts militia during the American Revolutionary War, and also served in the Massachusetts Provincial Congress and the General Court of Massachusetts, and built the Col. Thomas Carpenter III house.
- Nathaniel L. Carpenter (November 18, 1805 at Randolph, Vermont – December 23, 1892 at Natchez, Mississippi) who along with 2 brothers settled in the South where he had success in steamboats and cotton trading. In 1909 his immediate descendants built and donated to the city of Natchez the Carpenter Schools.
- Another member of this family was George Rice Carpenter (1863–1909), born in Labrador and a graduate of Harvard in 1886. He taught at Harvard from 1888 to 1890 and at Massachusetts Institute of Technology from 1890 to 1893. In 1893 he became a professor of English rhetoric at Columbia University and authored a long list of textbooks on literature and rhetoric and biographies of Whittier, Whitman, and Longfellow. A classics library at Columbia is named in his honor.
- Painter Francis Bicknell Carpenter's (1830–1900) work hangs in the United States Capitol. Carpenter also resided with President Lincoln in the White House and published a memoir of his stay.
- Industrialist and engineer James Henry Carpenter (1846 – 1898) is a descendant through his father Charles. He founded the Carpenter Steel Company, which was renamed in 1968 as the Carpenter Technology Corporation.
- Lillian Carpenter Streeter (1854-1935), social reformer, clubwoman, author, descends from William Carpenter.
- Warren William “Hick” Carpenter (1855-1937), Major league baseball player
- Project Mercury astronaut and SEALAB aquanaut M. Scott Carpenter (1925-2013) descends from Joseph Carpenter, the fourth son of William Carpenter (Gen. 2).
- Early U.S. Naval Aviator Donald Marshall Carpenter of whom the USS Carpenter DD 825 was named for. He descends from William Carpenter, a son of William Carpenter (Gen. 2).
- Cyrus C Carpenter, eighth Governor of Iowa, is a descendant of William Carpenter, a son of William Carpenter (Gen. 2).
- Dr. Edmund Snow Carpenter (1922-2011), anthropologist and educator, a descendant of William Carpenter
- William H. Carpenter (1821-1885), U.S. Consul to Fuzhou, China, 1861-1865
- Sabrina Carpenter (1999-), actress and singer

== Relationship with other New England Carpenter families ==
William Carpenter (Rhode Island colonist), son of Richard Carpenter of Amesbury was a reportedly a first cousin of William Carpenter of Rehoboth, son of William Carpenter of Shalbourne, England. In addition he supposedly was closely related to Alexander Carpenter of Wrington, Somersetshire, and Leiden, Netherlands, of whom his four married daughters were in the Plymouth Colony in the early 1620s. This derives from Amos B. Carpenter’s unsupported claim that Richard of William of Shalbourne, and Alexander Carpenter were brothers. No genealogical evidence has been found even hinting at a link between the Wrington Carpenters, on the one hand, and either of the other two afore-mentioned families, on the other; a connection is highly improbable. Traditional genealogical research methods provide good reasons to doubt also that Providence William and Rehoboth William were closely related.
