= Stephen Bullock =

American politician

Member of the U.S. House of Representatives from Massachusetts's 7th district
- In office March 4, 1797 – March 3, 1799
- Preceded by: George Leonard
- Succeeded by: Phanuel Bishop

Personal details
- Born: October 10, 1735 Rehoboth, Province of Massachusetts Bay, British America
- Died: February 2, 1816 (aged 80) Rehoboth, Massachusetts, U.S.
- Party: Federalist
- Occupation: Schoolteacher; Jurist

Military service
- Allegiance: United States; Massachusetts
- Branch/service: Massachusetts Militia; Continental Army
- Rank: Captain
- Unit: Thomas Carpenter's Regiment
- Battles/wars: American Revolutionary War: Battle of Rhode Island

Stephen Bullock (October 10, 1735 – February 2, 1816) was a United States representative from Massachusetts. Born in Rehoboth in the Province of Massachusetts Bay, he attended the common schools, taught school, and was a captain of the Sixth Company in Col. Thomas Carpenter III's Regiment of Massachusetts militia during the Revolutionary War, and was in the Battle of Rhode Island in 1778. He was a delegate to the first State constitutional convention in 1780 and was a member of the Massachusetts House of Representatives in 1783, 1785, 1786, 1795, and 1796.

Bullock was elected as a Federalist to the Fifth Congress, serving from March 4, 1797 to March 3, 1799. He was judge of the Court of Common Pleas for Bristol County and from 1803 to 1805 was a member of the Governor's council. He died in Rehoboth; interment was in Burial Place Hill.

U.S. House of Representatives
| Preceded by George Leonard | Member of the U.S. House of Representatives from Massachusetts's 7th congressional district March 4, 1797 – March 3, 1799 | Succeeded by Phanuel Bishop |
