= Claude E. Carpenter =

American set decorator (1904–1976)

- Born: September 26, 1904; Glendale, Utah
- Died: February 18, 1976 (aged 71); Seattle, Washington
- Occupation: Set decorator
- Years active: 1939-1968

Claude E. Carpenter (September 26, 1904 – February 18, 1976) was an American set decorator. He was nominated for three Academy Awards in the category Best Art Direction.

== Life ==
Carpenter began his career as a production designer in Hollywood in 1938 in the adventure film Gunga Din, directed by George Stevens and starring Cary Grant, Douglas Fairbanks Jr., and Victor McLaglen. He worked on the set design of over sixty films until 1968.

At the 1945 Academy Awards, he was nominated for the first time for the Academy Award for Best Production Design in a Black-and-White Film, together with Albert S. D'Agostino, Carroll Clark and Darrell Silvera for the musical film Step Lively (1944) by Tim Whelan with Frank Sinatra, George Murphy and Adolphe Menjou.

Carpenter received his next Oscar nomination for Best Production Design in a Black and White Film, again together with Albert S. D'Agostino, Darrell Silvera and Jack Okey, in 1946 for Experiment in Terror (1944), a film by Jacques Tourneur starring Hedy Lamarr, George Brent and Paul Lukas.

Carpenter received his third and final Academy Award nomination for Best Production Design in a Black-and-White Motion Picture, along with Lyle R. Wheeler, Leland Fuller, and Thomas Little, at the 1953 Academy Awards for Viva Zapata! (1952), directed by Elia Kazan and starring Marlon Brando as Emiliano Zapata, and Jean Peters and Anthony Quinn in other leading roles.

== Selected filmography ==
Carpenter was nominated for three Academy Awards for Best Art Direction:

- Step Lively (1944)
- Experiment Perilous (1944)
- Viva Zapata! (1952)
