= George Rice Carpenter =

American academic (1863–1909)

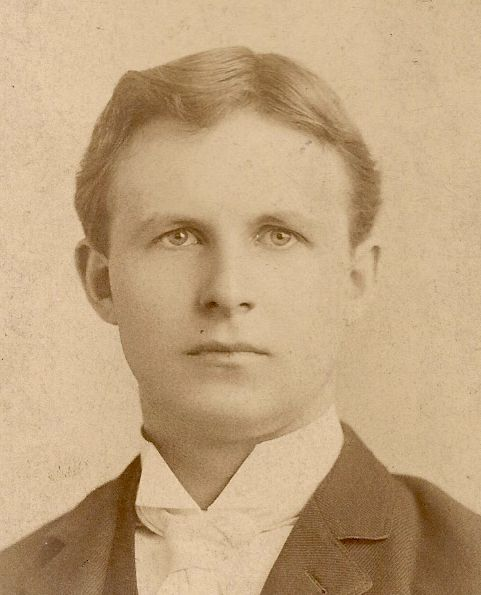
- Born: October 25, 1863; Eskimo River Mission Station, Labrador, now part of Canada
- Died: April 8, 1909 (aged 45); New York, New York
- Citizenship: American
- Occupations: Educator, scholar and author
- Years active: 1886–1909
- Spouse: Mary Seymour (m. 1890)
- Children: Margaret Seymour Carpenter

George Rice Carpenter (October 25, 1863 – April 8, 1909) was an American educator, scholar and writer. He was a descendant of the Rehoboth Carpenter Family and Edmund Rice of Massachusetts.

== Early life and education ==
His father was Charles Carrol Carpenter (born 1836) and mother was Nancy Feronia Rice (born 1840). His father was a Congregational minister who left an account of the final days of the Civil War and was an eyewitness of Abraham Lincoln's entry into Petersburg, Virginia.

George Rice Carpenter was born at the Eskimo River Mission Station on the Labrador Coast where his parents were engaged in pioneer missionary service. After attending Phillips Academy, Andover, Carpenter entered Harvard where he graduated in 1886.

== Academic career ==
Carpenter became a Harvard instructor in 1888 and assistant professor at MIT until 1893. Carpenter then became a professor and chairman of English rhetoric at Columbia University in New York where he remained for the duration of his life. He died in New York City in 1909 and was the subject of several articles in salutation. A library at Columbia is jointly named in his honor.

== Family of authors ==
Carpenter married Mary Seymour of New York in 1890. Carpenter's daughter Margaret Seymour Carpenter (Margaret Carpenter Richardson) (April 3, 1893 – 1973) was herself the author of several short stories and the novel Experiment Perilous, Little Brown & Co., Boston. (1943). George Rice Carpenter's publications were copious. A large number of textbooks were from his hand. Carpenter produced works on Longfellow (1901), Whittier (1903), Whitman (1909), among others listed in the next sections.

== Books ==
- Carpenter, George Rice. American Prose: Selections with Critical Introductions by Various Writers and a General Introduction, Macmillan, 1898.
- Brewster, William Tenney and Carpenter, George Rice. Studies in Structure and Style, Macmillan, 1898.
- Carpenter, George Rice. Walt Whitman, Macmillan, 1909.
- Carpenter, George Rice. John Greenleaf Whittier, Houghton, Mifflin and Co., 1909.
- Carpenter, George Rice. The Episode of the Donna Pietosa, 1889.
- Carpenter, George Rice, Baker, Franklin J, Scott, Fred N. The Teaching of English in the Elementary and the Secondary School, Longmans, Green & Co. 1903.
- Carpenter, George Rice, Baker, Franklin Thomas, Owens Jennie Freeborn. Language Reader, Macmillan, 1909.

== Articles referencing subject ==
- Brewster, William T. Columbia University Quarterly, June 1909.
- Fletcher, Jefferson B. Annual Report of the Dante Society, 1909, pp. 7–9.
- Steeves, R. Columbia University Quarterly (extensive bibliography), September 1909.

== Genealogy ==
George Rice Carpenter was a descendant of Edmund Rice, an English immigrant to Massachusetts Bay Colony.

== See also ==
- The Harvard Monthly
