= Thomas Carpenter III =

American soldier

- Born: October 24, 1733; Rehoboth, Province of Massachusetts
- Died: April 26, 1807 (aged 73); Rehoboth, Massachusetts
- Occupations: Colonel, Revolutionary War Militia from Massachusetts
- Known for: NRHP, American Revolutionary War Patriot

Thomas Carpenter III was born October 24, 1733, in Rehoboth, Province of Massachusetts and died April 26, 1807, in Rehoboth. He was an American Revolutionary War officer who served as a colonel in the Massachusetts Militia (United States) and commanded the First Bristol Regiment from 1776 to 1780. Carpenter was elected as a delegate in 1774 to represent Rehoboth for the Massachusetts Provincial Congress and was elected Deputy to the General Court of Massachusetts in 1775.

Carpenter built the now historic Col. Thomas Carpenter III House for his wife in 1755. It is located at 77 Bay State Road in Rehoboth, Massachusetts, and was added to the National Register of Historic Places in 1983.

== Family ==
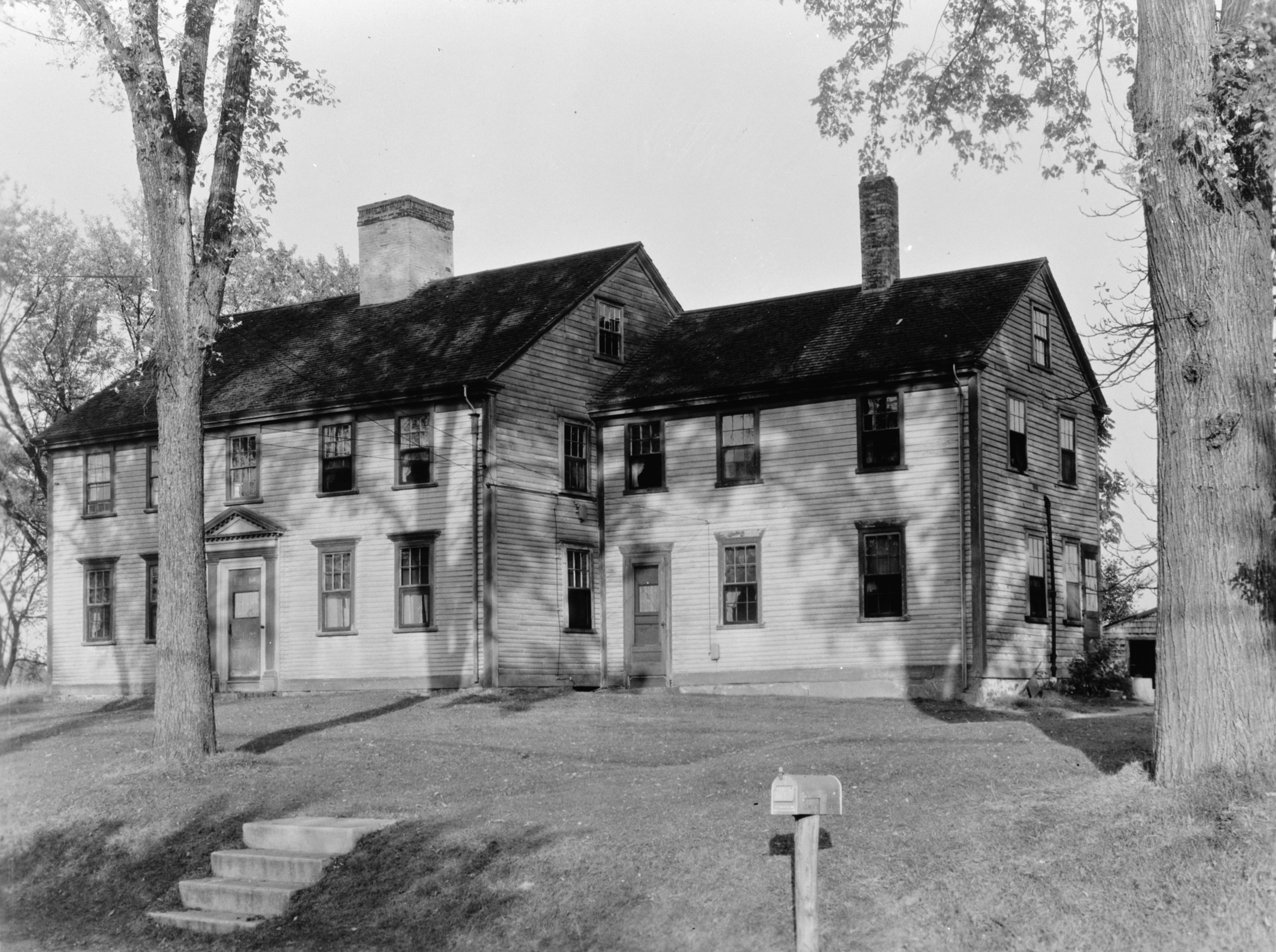

Thomas Carpenter married on December 26, 1754, Elizabeth Moulton (born 1736 Bristol County, Massachusetts, died May 17, 1804, in Rehoboth) and they moved into the then newly built house (now on 77 Bay State Road) before it was fully finished in September 1755. On December 22, 1755, their first daughter Elizabeth was born in their new home.

By August 1776 they would have twelve children born in their house. Unfortunately, several children would also die within the walls of their home. These were an unknown child in 1759, Sarah in 1775 who was age 15, William in 1763 as an infant, James in 1764 as an infant, and Nathan in 1772 who died as an infant. Another Nathan, age 12½, in 1789 may have died due to an accident outside the house. Those children who reached maturity were Elizabeth (born 1755), Thomas (born 1758), Stephen (born 1765), James (born 1767), Rebecca (born 1769), and Peter (born 1772).

Colonel Thomas Carpenter was the son of Thomas Carpenter (born 1692 and died 1779 in Rehoboth) and Mary Barstow (born about 1696 and died 1783 in Rehoboth) and he was the great-great-grandson of the William Carpenter the immigrant who was born in England in 1605 of the Rehoboth Carpenter family.

== Career ==
"October 3, 1774. The town Rehoboth chose Capt. Thomas Carpenter a delegate to represent them for the Massachusetts Provincial Congress that was organized on October 7, 1774. This was the first autonomous government of the Thirteen Colonies which later became the Commonwealth of Massachusetts.

Carpenter was elected Deputy to the General Court of Massachusetts in 1775.

Carpenter is listed often as a farmer, but served Rehoboth throughout his life in numerous jobs, committees and positions from the 1750s until the 1790s where his name is no longer seen on various public records.

== Revolutionary War ==
Carpenter was commissioned Colonel of a Bristol Massachusetts Militia Regiment on February 10, 1776. He commanded the First Bristol Regiment from 1776 to 1780. Col. Thomas Carpenter had 130 men fit for duty as by returns of General H. Parsons of the Provincial Army dated November 3, 1776.

The First Bristol Regiment, also known as Carpenter's Regiment, was under Major General Lincoln's command 1776 to 1779. A document dated November 28, 1776, from Boston indicates he marched to New York and he was noted in dispatches. What he was noted for is unknown. Carpenter's name and signature appears on a petition asking for a new choice of officers dated at Rehoboth, June 26, 1728. Carpenter served on the Rhode Island expedition July 24, 1778, serving 1 month and 19 days.

Carpenter's Regiment was under Brigadier General Godfrey's Brigade by July 5, 1779. His regiment served at Tiverton, July 26, 1780, for seven days. And served again at Tiverton dated August 1, 1780, for 9 days. On August 18, 1778, Carpenter's Regiment was ordered to Rhode Island for the campaign. On August 29, 1778, his Regiment saw action and he was distinguished for his activity and bravery. Several of his soldiers, residents of Rehoboth, were killed in this action.

== Historic house ==
The Col. Thomas Carpenter III House is a historic National Register of Historic Places house at 77 Bay State Road in Rehoboth, Massachusetts. It is a Georgian architecture style house built in 1755 and was added to the NRHP in 1983.

== See also ==
Two other Carpenter family houses in Rehoboth are listed on the U.S. National Register of Historic Places: Christopher Carpenter House and Carpenter House.
