= Joseph Barker (Massachusetts politician) =

American politician (1751–1815)

Member of the U.S. House of Representatives from Massachusetts's 7th district
- In office March 4, 1805 – March 3, 1809
- Preceded by: Nahum Mitchell
- Succeeded by: William Baylies

Member of the Massachusetts House of Representatives
- In office 1812–1813

Personal details
- Born: October 19, 1751 Branford, Connecticut Colony, British America
- Died: July 5, 1815 (aged 63) Middleboro, Massachusetts, U.S.
- Resting place: Cemetery at The Green
- Party: Democratic-Republican
- Education: Yale
- Profession: Minister

Joseph Barker (October 19, 1751 – July 5, 1815) was an American Congregationalist minister who represented Massachusetts's 7th congressional district in the United States House of Representatives from March 1805 to March 1809.

Born in Branford in the Connecticut Colony, Barker attended the common schools in Branford, studied for two years at Harvard College, and was graduated (with a degree in theology) from Yale College in 1771. He was licensed to preach on January 3, 1775, ordained to the ministry on December 5, 1781, and subsequently installed as pastor of the First Congregational Church of Middleboro, Massachusetts.

Barker was elected as a Democratic-Republican to the Ninth and Tenth Congresses and served from March 4, 1805 to March 3, 1809. He was not a candidate for renomination in 1808, but four years later served as a member of the state's House of Representatives in 1812 and 1813.

Joseph Barker continued in the ministry at Middleboro, Massachusetts until his death at the age of 63. Interment was in Cemetery at The Green.

U.S. House of Representatives
Preceded by Nahum Mitchell	Member of the U.S. House of Representatives from Massachusetts's 7th congressional district March 4, 1805 – March 3, 1809	Succeeded by William Baylies
Political offices
Preceded by	Member of the Massachusetts House of Representatives; 1812-1813	Succeeded by
