= Nahum Mitchell =

American politician

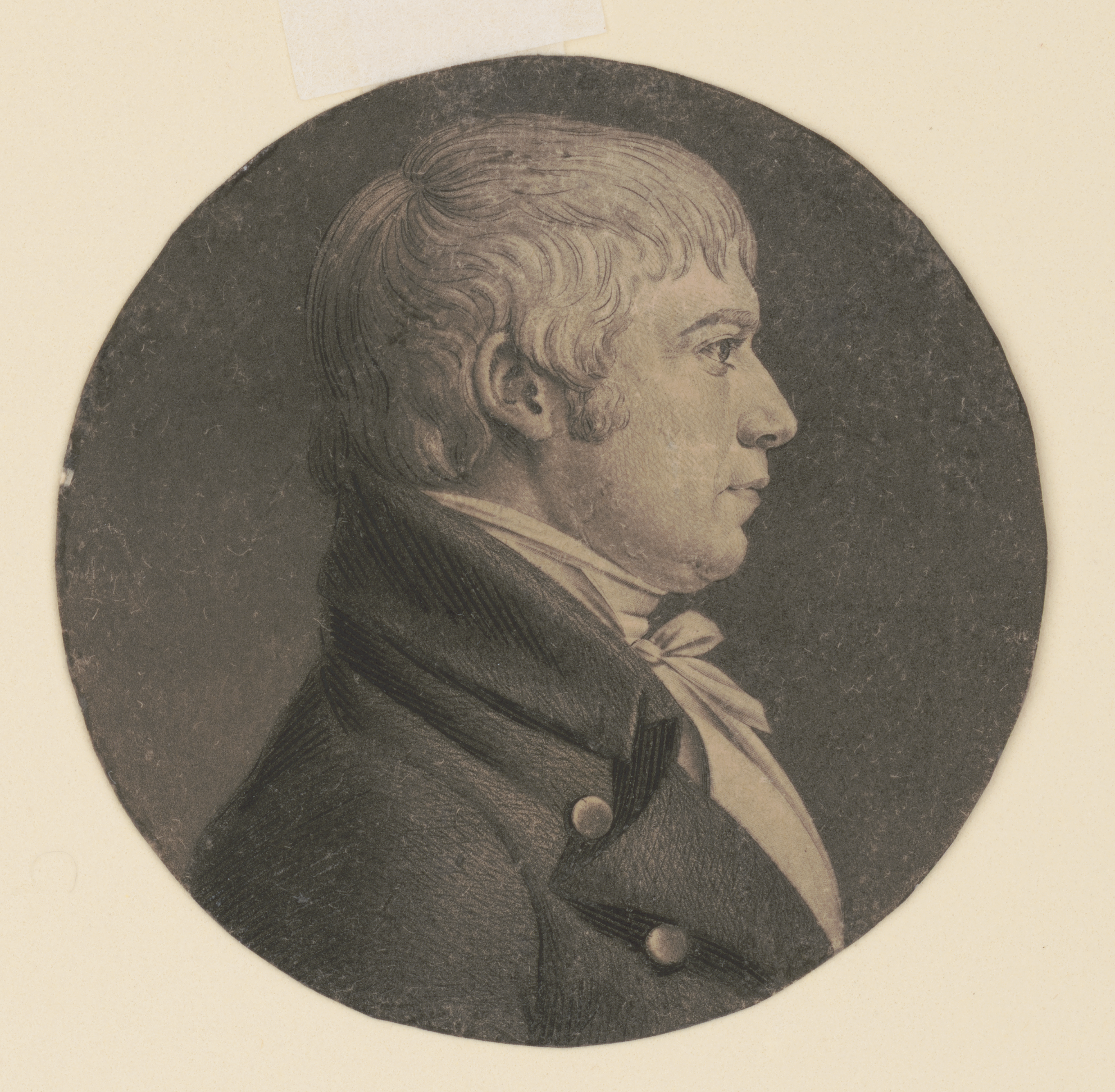

Member of the U.S. House of Representatives from Massachusetts's 7th district
- In office March 4, 1803 – March 3, 1805
- Preceded by: Phanuel Bishop
- Succeeded by: Joseph Barker

Treasurer and Receiver-General of Massachusetts
- In office 1822–1827
- Governor: John Brooks; William Eustis; Marcus Morton
- Preceded by: Daniel Sargent
- Succeeded by: Joseph Sewall

Member of the Massachusetts House of Representatives
- In office 1809; 1812

Member of the Massachusetts Senate
- In office 1813–1814

Personal details
- Born: February 12, 1769 Bridgewater, Massachusetts Bay, British America (now East Bridgewater)
- Died: August 1, 1853 (aged 84) Plymouth, Massachusetts, U.S.
- Party: Federalist
- Spouse: Nabby Lazell

Nahum Mitchell (February 12, 1769 – August 1, 1853) was a U.S. representative from Massachusetts.

Born in 1769 in the eastern portion of Bridgewater (which would later be incorporated as a separate municipality in 1823) in Massachusetts Bay, Mitchell attended the local school. He graduated from Harvard University in 1789. He studied law in Plymouth, Massachusetts. He was admitted to the bar and commenced practice in East Bridgewater, Massachusetts. He served as member of the State house of representatives 1798–1802.

Mitchell was elected as a Federalist to the Eighth Congress (March 4, 1803 – March 3, 1805). He was not a candidate for renomination. He was again a member of the State house of representatives in 1809 and 1812. He served as judge of the common pleas court 1811-1821 and chief justice 1819–1821. He served in the State senate in 1813 and 1814. He served as member of the Governor's council 1814–1820. State treasurer of Massachusetts 1822–1827. Librarian in 1835 and 1836 and treasurer 1839-1845 of the Massachusetts Historical Society.

Mitchell's love for music began early, was leader of the church choir and a teacher of music in East Bridgewater. One of his pieces was performed in the World's Columbian Exposition concerts in Chicago in 1893. He was also one of the first American composers; his work sold more than 100,000 copies. He died in Plymouth, Massachusetts, August 1, 1853. He was interred in Old Central Street Cemetery, East Bridgewater, Massachusetts.

== Publications ==
- Grammar of Music published in the Boston "Euterpeiad"
- The Brattle Street Collection (Boston, 1810)
- The Bridgewater Collection of Sacred Music (Boston, 1812)
- and a series of articles on the History of Music

U.S. House of Representatives
Preceded by Phanuel Bishop	Member of the U.S. House of Representatives from Massachusetts's 7th congressional district March 4, 1803 – March 3, 1805	Succeeded by Joseph Barker
Political offices
Preceded by Daniel Sargent	Treasurer and Receiver-General of Massachusetts; 1822–1827	Succeeded by Joseph Sewall
