= William Baylies =

American politician

Member of the U.S. House of Representatives from Massachusetts
- In office March 4, 1809 – June 28, 1809
- Preceded by: Joseph Barker
- Succeeded by: Charles Turner, Jr.
- Constituency: 7th district
- In office March 4, 1813 – March 3, 1817
- Preceded by: Charles Turner Jr.
- Succeeded by: John W. Hulbert
- Constituency: 7th district (1813–15); 8th district (1815–17)
- In office March 4, 1833 – March 3, 1835
- Preceded by: Henry A. S. Dearborn
- Succeeded by: Nathaniel B. Borden
- Constituency: 10th district

Member of the Massachusetts House of Representatives
- In office 1808–1809; 1812–1813; 1820–1821

Member of the Massachusetts Senate
- In office 1825–1826; 1830–1831

Personal details
- Born: William Baylies; September 15, 1776 Dighton, Massachusetts
- Died: September 27, 1865 (aged 89) Taunton, Massachusetts, U.S.
- Resting place: Dighton Town Cemetery; Dighton, Massachusetts
- Party: Federalist; Jackson Federalist; National Republican
- Relations: Francis Baylies
- Education: Brown University
- Profession: Lawyer

William Baylies (September 15, 1776 – September 27, 1865) was an American lawyer and politician who served four non-consecutive terms as a U.S. representative from Massachusetts in the early to mid-19th century.

He was the brother of congressman Francis Baylies. His great-grandfather was Thomas Baylies, an ironmaster from Coalbrookdale, England, who immigrated to Boston in 1737.

== Biography ==
Baylies was born in Dighton, Massachusetts, in 1776, the son of Dr. William Baylies (1743–1826). He graduated from Brown University, Providence, Rhode Island, in 1795 where he studied law.

=== Early career ===
He was admitted to the bar and commenced practice in Bridgewater (west parish) in 1799 and served as member of the State house of representatives in 1808, 1809, 1812, 1813, 1820, and 1821 and in the State Senate in 1825, 1826, 1830, and 1831.

He was elected a member of the American Antiquarian Society in 1814.

=== Contested election ===
Baylies was credentialed and seated in the 11th Congress, but the election was contested by his opponent Charles Turner Jr. Turner had won a majority of the ballots in the November 1808 election, but the Governor ruled that no one had received a majority because nearly 20% of Turner's votes had been cast for "Charles Turner" and the rest for "Charles Turner, Jr." The Governor called for a special election that Baylies won and he took the seat. But Turner successfully argued that the votes that omitted "Jr." were clearly intended for him. The special election was deemed void and on June 28 Baylies was deemed unentitled to the seat.

=== Congress ===
Baylies was then elected as a Federalist to the Thirteenth and Fourteenth Congresses (March 4, 1813 – March 3, 1817). He was elected as an Anti-Jacksonian to the Twenty-third Congress (March 4, 1833 – March 3, 1835).

=== Death and burial ===
He died in Taunton, Massachusetts, on September 27, 1865. Interment was in Dighton Town Cemetery, Dighton, Massachusetts.

U.S. House of Representatives
Preceded by Charles Turner, Jr.	Member of the U.S. House of Representatives from Massachusetts's 7th congressional district March 4, 1813 – March 3, 1815	Succeeded by John W. Hulbert
Preceded by John Reed, Jr.	Member of the U.S. House of Representatives from Massachusetts's 8th congressional district March 4, 1815 – March 3, 1817	Succeeded by Zabdiel Sampson
Preceded by Henry A. S. Dearborn	Member of the U.S. House of Representatives from Massachusetts's 10th congressional district March 4, 1833 – March 3, 1835	Succeeded by Nathaniel B. Borden
Political offices
Preceded by	Member of the Massachusetts House of Representatives	Succeeded by
Preceded by	Member of the Massachusetts State Senate	Succeeded by
