= Charles Turner Jr. =

American politician (1760–1839)

Member of the U.S. House of Representatives from Massachusetts's 7th district
- In office June 28, 1809 – March 3, 1813
- Preceded by: William Baylies
- Succeeded by: William Baylies

Personal details
- Born: June 20, 1760 Duxbury, Province of Massachusetts Bay, British America
- Died: May 16, 1839 (aged 78) Scituate, Massachusetts, U.S.
- Party: Democratic-Republican

Charles Turner Jr. (June 20, 1760 – May 16, 1839) was a U.S. representative from Massachusetts.

Born in Duxbury in the Province of Massachusetts Bay, Turner received a common-school education at Duxbury and Scituate. He was commissioned an adjutant in the Massachusetts State Militia in 1787. He was promoted to major in 1790, and held the rank of lieutenant colonel commandant 1798–1812.

He was appointed first postmaster of Scituate, Massachusetts, in 1800. He was in the Justice of the Peace. He served as member of the State house of representatives in 1803 and 1805–1808.

He successfully contested as a Democratic-Republican the election of William Baylies to the Eleventh Congress. He was reelected to the Twelfth Congress and served from June 28, 1809, to March 3, 1813. He served as chairman of the Committee on Accounts (Twelfth Congress). The U.S. Declaration of War on the United Kingdom of Great Britain and Ireland in 1812 was not universally popular in Massachusetts and Turner was one of several of its politicians who were assaulted for their support: "...Charles Turner, member for the Plymouth district, and Chief-Justice of the Court of Sessions for that county, was seized by a crowd on the evening of August 3, [1812] and kicked through the town."

He was an unsuccessful candidate for reelection to the Thirteenth Congress. He served in the State senate in 1816. He was again a member of the State house of representatives in 1817, 1819, and 1823. He was appointed steward of the Marine Hospital at Chelsea, Massachusetts. He served as delegate to the Massachusetts Constitutional Convention of 1820–1821.

He also engaged in agricultural pursuits.

Possibly the first non-Native American to climb Mount Katahdin in Maine, Turner was the first to record his climb. About the ascent he wrote: On Monday, August 13, 1804, at 8 o’clock A.M. we left our canoes at the head of boat waters, in a small clear stream of spring water, which came in different rivulets from the mountain, the principal of which (as we afterwards found) issued from a large gully near the top of the mountain. At 5 o'clock, P.M. we reached the summit of the mountain. Katahdin is the southernmost and highest of a collection of eight or ten mountains, extending from it north east and north west.

He died in Scituate, Massachusetts, May 16, 1839. He was interred in the burial ground of the First Parish of Norwell (formerly Scituate).

U.S. House of Representatives
Preceded by William Baylies	Member of the U.S. House of Representatives from Massachusetts's 7th congressional district June 28, 1809 – March 3, 1813	Succeeded by William Baylies
