= Massachusetts's 7th congressional district =

U.S. House district for Massachusetts

Coordinates: 42°19′00″N 71°00′34″W

- Interactive map of district boundaries since January 3, 2023
- Representative: Ayanna Pressley; D–Boston
- Population (2025): 783,525
- Median household income: $100,252
- Ethnicity: 38.7% White; 21.9% Hispanic; 20.4% Black; 11.7% Asian; 5.4% Two or more races; 2.0% other
- Cook PVI: D+34

Massachusetts's 7th congressional district is a congressional district located in eastern Massachusetts, including roughly three-fourths of the city of Boston and a few of its northern and southern suburbs. The seat is currently held by Democrat Ayanna Pressley.

Due to redistricting after the 2010 census, the borders of the district were changed, with most of the old 7th district redistricted to the new 5th district, and most of the old 8th district comprising the new 7th district. With a Cook Partisan Voting Index rating of D+34, it is the most Democratic district in Massachusetts, a state with an all-Democratic congressional delegation.

According to The Boston Globe and the latest census data, approximately 33 percent of the population of the district were born outside of the United States, with approximately 34 percent of the population white, 26 percent African American, and 21 percent Latino.

In 2019, Ayanna Pressley became the first woman and person of color to represent the district as well as the Commonwealth of Massachusetts in Congress.

== Recent election results from statewide races ==
Year	Office	Results
2008	President	Obama 82% - 16%
2008	Senate	Kerry 86% - 14%
2010	Senate (Spec.)	Coakley 74% - 26%
2010	Governor	Patrick 74% - 20%
2012	President	Obama 84% - 16%
2012	Senate	Warren 79% - 21%
2014	Senate	Markey 85% - 15%
2014	Governor	Coakley 72% - 25%
2016	President	Clinton 83% - 12%
2018	Senate	Warren 85% - 13%
2018	Governor	Gonzalez 57% - 43%
2018	Secretary of the Commonwealth	Galvin 85% - 9%
2018	Attorney General	Healey 89% - 11%
2018	Treasurer and Receiver-General	Goldberg 85% - 11%
2018	Auditor	Bump 80% - 12%
2020	President	Biden 85% - 13%
2020	Senate	Markey 86% - 13%
2022	Governor	Healey 84% - 14%
2022	Secretary of the Commonwealth	Galvin 83% - 12%
2022	Attorney General	Campbell 85% - 15%
2022	Auditor	DiZoglio 74% - 17%
2024	President	Harris 79% - 17%
2024	Senate	Warren 82% - 18%

== Cities and towns in the district ==
For the 118th and successive Congresses (based on redistricting following the 2020 census), the district contains all or portions of three counties and 7 municipalities:

Middlesex County (3)

Cambridge (part; also 5th), Everett, Somerville

Norfolk County (2)

Milton (part; also 8th), Randolph

Suffolk County (2)

Boston (part; also 8th), Chelsea

== Cities and towns in the district prior to 2013 ==
=== 1840s ===
1849: "The whole of Berkshire County; Ashfield, Buckland, Charlemont, Coleraine, Conway, Hawley, Heath, Leyden, Monroe, Rowe, and Shelburne, in Franklin County; Chesterfield, Cummington, Goshen, Middlefield, Norwich, Plainfield, Southampton, Westhampton, Williamsburg, and Worthington, in Hampshire County; and Blandford, Chester, Granville, Montgomery, Russell, and Tolland, in the County of Hampden."

=== 1850s–1880s ===
An act of the legislature passed April 22, 1852, divided the 7th district of Massachusetts as such: "The towns of Andover, Boxford, Bradford, Danvers, Haverhill, Lawrence, Lynnfield, Methuen, Middleton, Saugus, and Topsfield in the county of Essex; and the city of Charlestown, and the towns of Burlington, Lexington, Malden, Medford, Melrose, Reading, Somerville, South Reading, Stoneham, Waltham, and Woburn, in the county of Middlesex."

=== 1890s ===
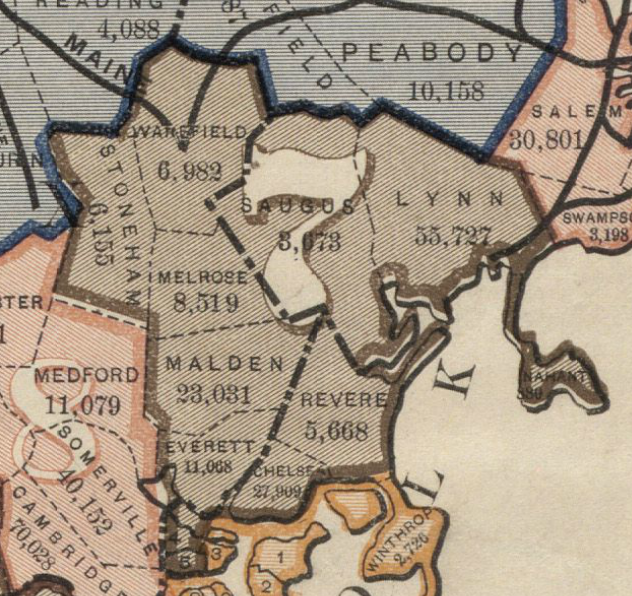
Massachusetts's 7th congressional district, 1891

1893: "Essex County: Towns of Lynn, Nahant, and Saugus. Middlesex County: Towns of Everett, Malden, Melrose, Stoneham, and Wakefield. Suffolk County: 4th and 5th wards of the city of Boston, and the towns of Chelsea and Revere."

=== 1910s ===
1916: In Essex County: Boxford, Lawrence, Lynn, Lynnfield, Middleton, Nahant, North Andover, Peabody, Saugus. In Middlesex County: North Reading.

=== 1940s ===
1941: In Essex County: Lawrence, Lynn (part), Middleton, Nahant, North Andover, Peabody. In Suffolk County: Chelsea, Revere, Winthrop.

=== 2003-2013 ===
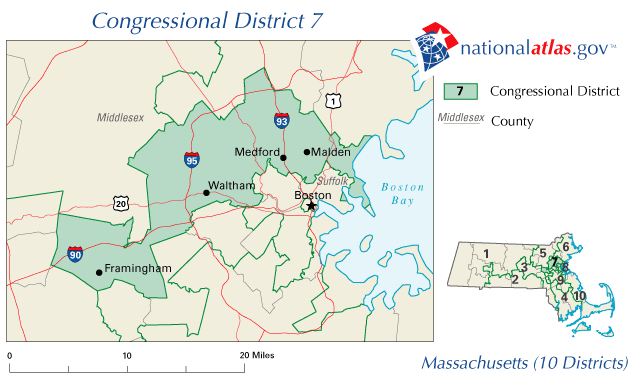
The district from 2003 to 2013

In Middlesex County:

- Arlington
- Belmont
- Everett
- Framingham
- Lexington
- Lincoln
- Malden
- Medford
- Melrose
- Natick
- Stoneham
- Waltham
- Watertown
- Wayland: Precinct 2
- Weston
- Winchester
- Woburn

In Suffolk County:

- Revere
- Winthrop

== List of members representing the district ==
Member	Party	Years	Cong ress	Electoral history	District location
District created March 4, 1789
George Leonard (Raynham)	Pro-Administration	March 4, 1789 – March 3, 1791	1st	Elected in 1788. Redistricted to the 6th district.	1789–1793; Bristol County, Dukes County, and Nantucket County
Artemas Ward (Shrewsbury)	Pro-Administration	March 4, 1791 – March 3, 1793	2nd	Elected in 1790. Redistricted to the 2nd district.	1789–1793; Bristol County, Dukes County, and Nantucket County
District inactive		March 4, 1793 – March 3, 1795	3rd		
George Leonard (Raynham)	Federalist	March 4, 1795 – March 3, 1797	4th	Elected in 1795 on the fourth ballot. Retired.	1795–1803 "3rd Southern district"
Stephen Bullock (Rehoboth)	Federalist	March 4, 1797 – March 3, 1799	5th	Elected in 1797 on the third ballot. Lost re-election.	1795–1803 "3rd Southern district"
Phanuel Bishop (Rehoboth)	Democratic-Republican	March 4, 1799 – March 3, 1803	6th 7th	Elected in 1799 on the fourth ballot. Re-elected in 1800. Redistricted to the 9th district.	1795–1803 "3rd Southern district"
Nahum Mitchell (East Bridgewater)	Federalist	March 4, 1803 – March 3, 1805	8th	Elected in 1802. Lost re-election.	1803–1815 "Plymouth district"
Joseph Barker (Middleboro)	Democratic-Republican	March 4, 1805 – March 3, 1809	9th 10th	Elected in 1804. Re-elected in 1806. Retired.	1803–1815 "Plymouth district"
William Baylies (Bridgewater)	Federalist	March 4, 1809 – June 28, 1809	11th	Elected in 1808. Lost election challenge. (Note: In the 1808 election, there were 430 votes for "Charles Turner," which were counted separately from Charles Turner Jr. (Democratic-Republican). This caused the vote tally to be William Baylies (Federalist) 1,828 (49.4%), Charles Turner Jr. (Democratic-Republican) 1,443 (39.0%), "Charles Turner" 430 (11.6%). As no candidate had a majority, a second election was held on January 19, 1809, which elected Baylies with 54.3% of the vote.Turner successfully contested this election and was subsequently declared the winner based on the first ballot, with the second invalidated. He was seated June 8, 1809)	1803–1815 "Plymouth district"
Charles Turner Jr. (Scituate)	Democratic-Republican	June 28, 1809 – March 3, 1813	11th 12th	Won election challenge. Re-elected in 1810. Lost re-election.	1803–1815 "Plymouth district"
William Baylies (Bridgewater)	Federalist	March 4, 1813 – March 3, 1815	13th	Elected in 1812. Redistricted to the 8th district.	1803–1815 "Plymouth district"
John W. Hulbert (Pittsfield)	Federalist	March 4, 1815 – March 3, 1817	14th	Redistricted from the 12th district and re-elected in 1814. Retired.	1815–1823 "Berkshire district"
Henry Shaw (Lanesboro)	Democratic-Republican	March 4, 1817 – March 3, 1821	15th 16th	Elected in 1816. Re-elected in 1819 on the second ballot. Retired.	1815–1823 "Berkshire district"
Henry W. Dwight (Stockbridge)	Federalist	March 4, 1821 – March 3, 1823	17th	Elected in 1820. Redistricted to the 9th district.	1815–1823 "Berkshire district"
Samuel C. Allen (Greenfield)	Federalist	March 4, 1823 – March 3, 1825	18th 19th 20th	Redistricted from the 6th district. Re-elected in 1825. Re-elected in 1826. [data missing]	1823–1833 "Franklin district"
Samuel C. Allen (Greenfield)	Anti-Jacksonian	March 4, 1825 – March 3, 1829	18th 19th 20th	Redistricted from the 6th district. Re-elected in 1825. Re-elected in 1826. [data missing]	1823–1833 "Franklin district"
George Grennell Jr. (Greenfield)	Anti-Jacksonian	March 4, 1829 – March 3, 1833	21st 22nd	Elected in 1828. Re-elected in 1830. Redistricted to the 6th district.	1823–1833 "Franklin district"
George N. Briggs (Lanesboro)	Anti-Jacksonian	March 4, 1833 – March 3, 1837	23rd 24th 25th 26th 27th	Redistricted from the 9th district and re-elected in 1833. Re-elected in 1834. Re-elected in 1836. Re-elected in 1838. Re-elected in 1840. Retired.	1833–1843 [data missing]
George N. Briggs (Lanesboro)	Whig	March 4, 1837 – March 3, 1843	23rd 24th 25th 26th 27th	Redistricted from the 9th district and re-elected in 1833. Re-elected in 1834. Re-elected in 1836. Re-elected in 1838. Re-elected in 1840. Retired.	1833–1843 [data missing]
Julius Rockwell (Pittsfield)	Whig	March 4, 1843 – March 3, 1851	28th 29th 30th 31st	Elected late on the sixth ballot in 1844. Re-elected in 1846. Re-elected in 1848. [data missing]	1843–1853 [data missing]
John Z. Goodrich (Glendale)	Whig	March 4, 1851 – March 3, 1853	32nd	Elected in 1851. Redistricted to the 11th district.	1843–1853 [data missing]
Nathaniel P. Banks (Waltham)	Democratic	March 4, 1853 – March 3, 1855	33rd 34th 35th	Elected in 1852. Re-elected in 1854. Re-elected in 1856. Resigned to become Governor of Massachusetts.	1853–1863 [data missing]
Nathaniel P. Banks (Waltham)	Know Nothing	March 4, 1855 – March 3, 1857	33rd 34th 35th	Elected in 1852. Re-elected in 1854. Re-elected in 1856. Resigned to become Governor of Massachusetts.	1853–1863 [data missing]
Nathaniel P. Banks (Waltham)	Republican	March 4, 1857 – December 24, 1857	33rd 34th 35th	Elected in 1852. Re-elected in 1854. Re-elected in 1856. Resigned to become Governor of Massachusetts.	1853–1863 [data missing]
Vacant		December 24, 1857 – January 31, 1858	35th		1853–1863 [data missing]
Daniel W. Gooch (Melrose)	Republican	January 31, 1858 – March 3, 1863	35th 36th 37th	Elected to finish Banks's term. Re-elected in 1858. Re-elected in 1860. Redistricted to the 6th district.	1853–1863 [data missing]
George S. Boutwell (Groton)	Republican	March 4, 1863 – March 12, 1869	38th 39th 40th 41st	Elected in 1862. Re-elected in 1864. Re-elected in 1866. Re-elected in 1868. Resigned to become U.S. Secretary of Treasury.	1863–1873 [data missing]
Vacant		March 12, 1869 – November 2, 1869	41st		1863–1873 [data missing]
George M. Brooks (Concord)	Republican	November 2, 1869 – May 13, 1872	41st 42nd	Elected to finish Boutwell's term. Re-elected in 1870. Resigned.	1863–1873 [data missing]
Vacant		May 13, 1872 – December 2, 1872	42nd		1863–1873 [data missing]
Constantine C. Esty (Framingham)	Republican	December 2, 1872 – March 3, 1873	42nd	Elected to finish Brooks's term. [data missing]	1863–1873 [data missing]
Ebenezer R. Hoar (Concord)	Republican	March 4, 1873 – March 3, 1875	43rd	Elected in 1872. [data missing]	1873–1883 [data missing]
John K. Tarbox (Lawrence)	Democratic	March 4, 1875 – March 3, 1877	44th	Elected in 1874. [data missing]	1873–1883 [data missing]
Benjamin F. Butler (Lowell)	Republican	March 4, 1877 – March 3, 1879	45th	Elected in 1876. [data missing]	1873–1883 [data missing]
William A. Russell (Lawrence)	Republican	March 4, 1879 – March 3, 1883	46th 47th	Elected in 1878. Re-elected in 1880. Redistricted to the 8th district.	1873–1883 [data missing]
Eben F. Stone (Newburyport)	Republican	March 4, 1883 – March 3, 1887	48th 49th	Redistricted from the 6th district and re-elected in 1882. Re-elected in 1884. [data missing]	1883–1893 [data missing]
William Cogswell (Salem)	Republican	March 4, 1887 – March 3, 1893	50th 51st 52nd	Elected in 1886. Re-elected in 1888. Re-elected in 1890. Redistricted to the 6th district.	1883–1893 [data missing]
Vacant		March 4, 1893 – April 25, 1893	53rd	Member Henry Cabot Lodge had been redistricted from the 6th district and re-elected in 1892, but resigned to become a U.S. senator.	1893–1903 [data missing]
William Everett (Quincy)	Democratic	April 25, 1893 – March 3, 1895	53rd	Elected to finish Cabot Lodge's term. [data missing]	1893–1903 [data missing]
William Emerson Barrett (Melrose)	Republican	March 4, 1895 – March 3, 1899	54th 55th	Elected in 1894. Re-elected in 1896. [data missing]	1893–1903 [data missing]
Ernest W. Roberts (Chelsea)	Republican	March 4, 1899 – March 3, 1913	56th 57th 58th 59th 60th 61st 62nd	Elected in 1898. Re-elected in 1900. Re-elected in 1902. Re-elected in 1904. Re-elected in 1906. Re-elected in 1908. Re-elected in 1910. Redistricted to the 9th district.	1893–1903 [data missing]
Ernest W. Roberts (Chelsea)	Republican	March 4, 1899 – March 3, 1913	56th 57th 58th 59th 60th 61st 62nd	Elected in 1898. Re-elected in 1900. Re-elected in 1902. Re-elected in 1904. Re-elected in 1906. Re-elected in 1908. Re-elected in 1910. Redistricted to the 9th district.	1903–1913 [data missing]
Michael Francis Phelan (Lynn)	Democratic	March 4, 1913 – March 3, 1921	63rd 64th 65th 66th	Elected in 1912. Re-elected in 1914. Re-elected in 1916. Re-elected in 1918. Lost re-election.	1913–1923 [data missing]
Robert S. Maloney (Lawrence)	Republican	March 4, 1921 – March 3, 1923	67th	Elected in 1920. Lost re-election.	1913–1923 [data missing]
William P. Connery Jr. (Lynn)	Democratic	March 4, 1923 – June 15, 1937	68th 69th 70th 71st 72nd 73rd 74th 75th	Elected in 1922. Re-elected in 1924. Re-elected in 1926. Re-elected in 1928. Re-elected in 1930. Re-elected in 1932. Re-elected in 1934. Died.	1923–1933 [data missing]
William P. Connery Jr. (Lynn)	Democratic	March 4, 1923 – June 15, 1937	68th 69th 70th 71st 72nd 73rd 74th 75th	Elected in 1922. Re-elected in 1924. Re-elected in 1926. Re-elected in 1928. Re-elected in 1930. Re-elected in 1932. Re-elected in 1934. Died.	1933–1943 [data missing]
Vacant		June 16, 1937 – September 27, 1937	75th		1933–1943 [data missing]
Lawrence J. Connery (Lynn)	Democratic	September 28, 1937 – October 19, 1941	75th 76th 77th	Elected to finish his brother's term. Re-elected in 1938. Re-elected in 1940. Died.	1933–1943 [data missing]
Vacant		October 20, 1941 – December 29, 1941	77th		1933–1943 [data missing]
Thomas J. Lane (Lawrence)	Democratic	December 30, 1941 – January 3, 1963	77th 78th 79th 80th 81st 82nd 83rd 84th 85th 86th 87th	Elected to finish Connery's term. Re-elected in 1942. Re-elected in 1944. Re-elected in 1946. Re-elected in 1948. Re-elected in 1950. Re-elected in 1952. Re-elected in 1954. Re-elected in 1956. Re-elected in 1958. Re-elected in 1960. Redistricted to the 5th district and lost re-election.	1933–1943 [data missing]
Thomas J. Lane (Lawrence)	Democratic	December 30, 1941 – January 3, 1963	77th 78th 79th 80th 81st 82nd 83rd 84th 85th 86th 87th	Elected to finish Connery's term. Re-elected in 1942. Re-elected in 1944. Re-elected in 1946. Re-elected in 1948. Re-elected in 1950. Re-elected in 1952. Re-elected in 1954. Re-elected in 1956. Re-elected in 1958. Re-elected in 1960. Redistricted to the 5th district and lost re-election.	1943–1953 [data missing]
Thomas J. Lane (Lawrence)	Democratic	December 30, 1941 – January 3, 1963	77th 78th 79th 80th 81st 82nd 83rd 84th 85th 86th 87th	Elected to finish Connery's term. Re-elected in 1942. Re-elected in 1944. Re-elected in 1946. Re-elected in 1948. Re-elected in 1950. Re-elected in 1952. Re-elected in 1954. Re-elected in 1956. Re-elected in 1958. Re-elected in 1960. Redistricted to the 5th district and lost re-election.	1953–1963 [data missing]
Torbert H. Macdonald (Malden)	Democratic	January 3, 1963 – May 21, 1976	88th 89th 90th 91st 92nd 93rd 94th	Redistricted from the 8th district. Elected in 1962. Re-elected in 1964. Re-elected in 1966. Re-elected in 1968. Re-elected in 1970. Re-elected in 1972. Re-elected in 1974. Died.	1963–1973 [data missing]
Torbert H. Macdonald (Malden)	Democratic	January 3, 1963 – May 21, 1976	88th 89th 90th 91st 92nd 93rd 94th	Redistricted from the 8th district. Elected in 1962. Re-elected in 1964. Re-elected in 1966. Re-elected in 1968. Re-elected in 1970. Re-elected in 1972. Re-elected in 1974. Died.	1973–1983 [data missing]
Vacant		May 22, 1976 – November 1, 1976	94th		1973–1983 [data missing]
Ed Markey (Malden)	Democratic	November 2, 1976 – January 3, 2013	94th 95th 96th 97th 98th 99th 100th 101st 102nd 103rd 104th 105th 106th 107th 108th 109th 110th 111th 112th	Elected to finish Macdonald's term. Simultaneously elected to a full term in 1976. Re-elected in 1978. Re-elected in 1980. Re-elected in 1982. Re-elected in 1984. Re-elected in 1986. Re-elected in 1988. Re-elected in 1990. Re-elected in 1992. Re-elected in 1994. Re-elected in 1996. Re-elected in 1998. Re-elected in 2000. Re-elected in 2002. Re-elected in 2004. Re-elected in 2006. Re-elected in 2008. Re-elected in 2010. Redistricted to the 5th district.	1973–1983 [data missing]
Ed Markey (Malden)	Democratic	November 2, 1976 – January 3, 2013	94th 95th 96th 97th 98th 99th 100th 101st 102nd 103rd 104th 105th 106th 107th 108th 109th 110th 111th 112th	Elected to finish Macdonald's term. Simultaneously elected to a full term in 1976. Re-elected in 1978. Re-elected in 1980. Re-elected in 1982. Re-elected in 1984. Re-elected in 1986. Re-elected in 1988. Re-elected in 1990. Re-elected in 1992. Re-elected in 1994. Re-elected in 1996. Re-elected in 1998. Re-elected in 2000. Re-elected in 2002. Re-elected in 2004. Re-elected in 2006. Re-elected in 2008. Re-elected in 2010. Redistricted to the 5th district.	1983–1993 [data missing]
Ed Markey (Malden)	Democratic	November 2, 1976 – January 3, 2013	94th 95th 96th 97th 98th 99th 100th 101st 102nd 103rd 104th 105th 106th 107th 108th 109th 110th 111th 112th	Elected to finish Macdonald's term. Simultaneously elected to a full term in 1976. Re-elected in 1978. Re-elected in 1980. Re-elected in 1982. Re-elected in 1984. Re-elected in 1986. Re-elected in 1988. Re-elected in 1990. Re-elected in 1992. Re-elected in 1994. Re-elected in 1996. Re-elected in 1998. Re-elected in 2000. Re-elected in 2002. Re-elected in 2004. Re-elected in 2006. Re-elected in 2008. Re-elected in 2010. Redistricted to the 5th district.	1993–2003 [data missing]
Ed Markey (Malden)	Democratic	November 2, 1976 – January 3, 2013	94th 95th 96th 97th 98th 99th 100th 101st 102nd 103rd 104th 105th 106th 107th 108th 109th 110th 111th 112th	Elected to finish Macdonald's term. Simultaneously elected to a full term in 1976. Re-elected in 1978. Re-elected in 1980. Re-elected in 1982. Re-elected in 1984. Re-elected in 1986. Re-elected in 1988. Re-elected in 1990. Re-elected in 1992. Re-elected in 1994. Re-elected in 1996. Re-elected in 1998. Re-elected in 2000. Re-elected in 2002. Re-elected in 2004. Re-elected in 2006. Re-elected in 2008. Re-elected in 2010. Redistricted to the 5th district.	2003–2013 [data missing]
Michael Capuano (Somerville)	Democratic	January 3, 2013 – January 3, 2019	113th 114th 115th	Redistricted from the 8th district. Elected in 2012. Re-elected in 2014. Re-elected in 2016. Lost renomination.	2013–2023
Ayanna Pressley (Boston)	Democratic	January 3, 2019 – present	116th 117th 118th 119th	Elected in 2018. Re-elected in 2020. Re-elected in 2022. Re-elected in 2024. Re-elected in 2026.	2013–2023
Ayanna Pressley (Boston)	Democratic	January 3, 2019 – present	116th 117th 118th 119th	Elected in 2018. Re-elected in 2020. Re-elected in 2022. Re-elected in 2024. Re-elected in 2026.	2023–present

== Recent election results ==
=== 2012 ===
Massachusetts's 7th congressional district, 2012
Party	Candidate	Votes	%
Democratic	Mike Capuano (incumbent)	210,794	83.4
Independent	Karla Romero	41,199	16.3
n/a	Write-ins	843	0.2
Total votes		252,836	100.0
Democratic hold			

=== 2014 ===
Massachusetts's 7th congressional district, 2014
Party	Candidate	Votes	%
Democratic	Mike Capuano (incumbent)	142,133	98.3
n/a	Write-ins	2,413	1.7
Total votes		144,546	100.0
Democratic hold			

=== 2016 ===
Massachusetts's 7th congressional district, 2016
Party	Candidate	Votes	%
Democratic	Mike Capuano (incumbent)	253,354	98.6
n/a	Write-ins	3,557	1.4
Total votes		256,911	100.0
Democratic hold			

=== 2018 ===
Massachusetts' 7th congressional district, 2018
Party	Candidate	Votes	%
Democratic	Ayanna Pressley	216,557	98.2
Write-in		3,852	1.8
Total votes		220,409	100.0
Democratic hold			

=== 2020 ===
Massachusetts's 7th congressional district, 2020
Party	Candidate	Votes	%
Democratic	Ayanna Pressley (incumbent)	267,362	86.6
Independent	Roy A. Owens Sr.	38,675	12.5
Write-in		2,613	0.9
Total votes		308,650	100.0
Democratic hold			

=== 2022 ===
Massachusetts's 7th congressional district, 2022
Party	Candidate	Votes	%
Democratic	Ayanna Pressley (incumbent)	151,825	84.6
Republican	Donnie Palmer	27,129	15.1
Write-in		557	0.3
Total votes		179,511	100.0
Democratic hold			

=== 2024 ===
2024 Massachusetts's 7th congressional district election
Party	Candidate	Votes	%
Democratic	Ayanna Pressley (incumbent)	232,094	97.1
Write-in		6,907	2.9
Total votes		239,001	100.0
Democratic hold			
