= Margaret Seymour Carpenter =

American novelist

Margaret Seymour Carpenter (April 3, 1893 - March 30, 1987) was the writer of the novel Experiment Perilous (Boston: Little Brown & Co., 1943), a New York Times Bestseller in 1943. The novel was produced by RKO Radio Pictures as a film of the same name, Experiment Perilous, starring Hedy Lamarr, George Brent, and Paul Lukas. She was the daughter of George Rice Carpenter and his wife, Mary Seymour.

== Personal life and death ==
She married on May 2, 1916, in New York City to Henry Barber Richardson of Boston, Massachusetts.

Carpenter died March 30, 1987, four days before her 94th birthday, in Boston, Massachusetts.
