= Nathaniel L. Carpenter =

American steamboat line owner

- Born: November 18, 1805
- Died: December 23, 1892 (aged 87)
- Known for: Entrepreneur and cotton factor

Nathaniel L. Carpenter (November 18, 1805 at Randolph, Vermont – December 23, 1892 at Natchez, Mississippi), was an entrepreneur, builder, owner of a steamboat line, and successful cotton trader of Natchez, Mississippi in the middle to late 19th century.

== Personal ==
Nathaniel L. Carpenter was a son of Joseph and Sarah (Buell) Carpenter, natives of Connecticut, of the Rehoboth Carpenter family of English descent. He married in 1837 at Buffalo, New York, to Julia Ann Luce. They were the parents of four children. Descendants still lived in Natchez in the early 1900s. Two of his brothers also settled in the South: Samuel Carpenter in New Orleans, Louisiana, and John B. Carpenter in Jefferson County, Mississippi.

== Career ==
In 1809, Nathaniel L. Carpenter's parents moved to Lancaster, New York, where they owned extensive property in what is now the city of Buffalo. He was raised and educated in Lancaster and first went into the stage line and hotel business there. In 1833 he went to Natchez, Mississippi, and began working as a builder. He left Natchez in 1834 and went first to St. Louis, Missouri, then to New Orleans, Louisiana, in 1835. He returned to Natchez about 1838 and settled permanently, becoming owner of a line of steamboats, a successful cotton trader, and active many other private and public concerns. He owned Myrtle Terrace town home in Natchez city, and nearby Dunleith plantation, both of which are on the annual Natchez historical pilgrimage tours. He was well traveled, journeying throughout the United States, Europe, and the South Pacific islands. During the American Civil War, he counseled neutrality, but both of his sons served in the Confederate States Army—Allen D. Carpenter in the Natchez Rifles and Joseph N. Carpenter (September 1, 1846 – married 1868 to Zapporah Russell of Louisiana – March 1, 1925) in the Breckinridge Guards. In 1909 his immediate descendants built and donated to the city of Natchez the Carpenter Schools.
