= Benajah Carpenter =

- Born: April 27, 1748
- Died: August 27, 1776 (aged 28); Long Island, New York
- Military career
- Allegiance: United States
- Branch: Continental Army
- Rank: Captain-Lieutenant
- Conflicts: American Revolutionary War: Siege of Boston; Battle of Long Island

Benajah Carpenter (April 27, 1748 – August 27, 1776) was a founding member of the United States Army Field Artillery Corps under Henry Knox and veteran of the Siege of Boston and Battle of Long Island.

He was a descendant of the Rehoboth Carpenter family. His father was Stephen Carpenter and mother Jane Thurston of Rehoboth, Massachusetts.

Benajah Carpenter was an apprenticed Rhode Island chairmaker until 1771. Carpenter is sometimes described as a "mariner." Although unsubstantiated, this may have been historically accurate. Private mariners of the period were those who possessed knowledge of cannon and artillery, a necessary part of early American shipping and seaborne trade. Carpenter may have been a merchant of the same wares he manufactured. The coast of Rhode Island was a center of such activity. Early Rhode Island newspapers contain notices of Carpenter's own difficulties with a chairmaker apprentice in 1774.

The activities of Benajah Carpenter abruptly changed with the coming of the American Revolution. He became a captain-lieutenant of artillery under Colonel Henry Knox and certainly participated in the Siege of Boston. As the struggle moved to New York, Carpenter was ordered by General George Washington to serve with General William Alexander of Pennsylvania ("Lord Stirling") and his Maryland contingent prior to the fateful morning of August 27. Henry Johnston in his Campaign of 1776, describes Carpenter as commanding the two-gun battery that opposed the British under Grant. Johnston surmises that it was Carpenter's battery that caused British light troops to retire to their main line. This was the first instance, Johnston tells us, where the newly minted American army met the British "in the open field" in classic military formation. We are told they "proved themselves the best of soldiers." During the subsequent long hours of battle Benajah Carpenter was among the day's casualties. Carpenter's military cap is extant and can be seen at the Rhode Island Varnum House Museum and Varnum Memorial Armory.

== Bibliography ==
- Providence Gazette, December 31, 1774
- Johnston, Henry P. The Campaign of 1776 Around New York and Brooklyn, New York, 1776.
- Carpenter, Amos B. A Genealogical History of the Rehoboth Branch of the Carpenter Family, Amherst, 1898.
- Smith, Joseph Jencks. Civil and Military List of Rhode Island, Preston and Rounds co., 1900.
- The Papers of George Washington, University of Virginia, vol. 5, p. 645.
- Journal of the House of Representatives of the United States, 1793-1797 Friday, February 21, 1794
- Ward, Christopher. The War of the Revolution, Macmillan Co., 1952, p. 221.
- Gallagher, John J., The Battle of Brooklyn, 1776, Castle Books, 2002.
