= Phanuel Bishop =

American politician

Member of the U.S. House of Representatives from Massachusetts
- In office March 4, 1799 – March 3, 1807
- Preceded by: Stephen Bullock
- Succeeded by: Josiah Dean
- Constituency: 7th district (1799–1803); 9th district (1803–07)

Member of the Massachusetts Senate
- In office 1788–1790
- Preceded by: Eph. Starkweather
- Succeeded by: David Perry

Member of the Massachusetts House of Representatives
- In office 1792; 1793; 1797; 1798

Personal details
- Born: September 3, 1739 Rehoboth, Province of Massachusetts Bay, British America
- Died: January 6, 1812 (aged 72) Rehoboth, Massachusetts, U.S.
- Party: Democratic-Republican

Phanuel Bishop (September 3, 1739 – January 6, 1812) was a United States representative from Massachusetts. Born in Rehoboth in the Province of Massachusetts Bay, he attended the common schools, was an innkeeper, and served in the Massachusetts State Senate from 1787 to 1791. He was a candidate for Congress in 1788 and 1790. He was a member of the Massachusetts House of Representatives in 1792, 1793, 1797, and 1798, and was elected as a Democratic-Republican to the Sixth through Ninth Congresses, serving from March 4, 1799 to March 3, 1807. He was one of six Democratic-Republican representatives to vote against the Twelfth Amendment to the United States Constitution. He died in Rehoboth, Mass; interment was in Old Cemetery, Rumford, Rhode Island.

U.S. House of Representatives
Preceded by Stephen Bullock	Member of the U.S. House of Representatives from Massachusetts's 7th congressional district March 4, 1799 – March 3, 1803	Succeeded by Nahum Mitchell
Preceded by Joseph B. Varnum	Member of the U.S. House of Representatives from Massachusetts's 9th congressional district March 4, 1803 – March 3, 1807	Succeeded by Josiah Dean
