= Ezra Carpenter House =

Historic house in Massachusetts, United States

- U.S. National Register of Historic Places
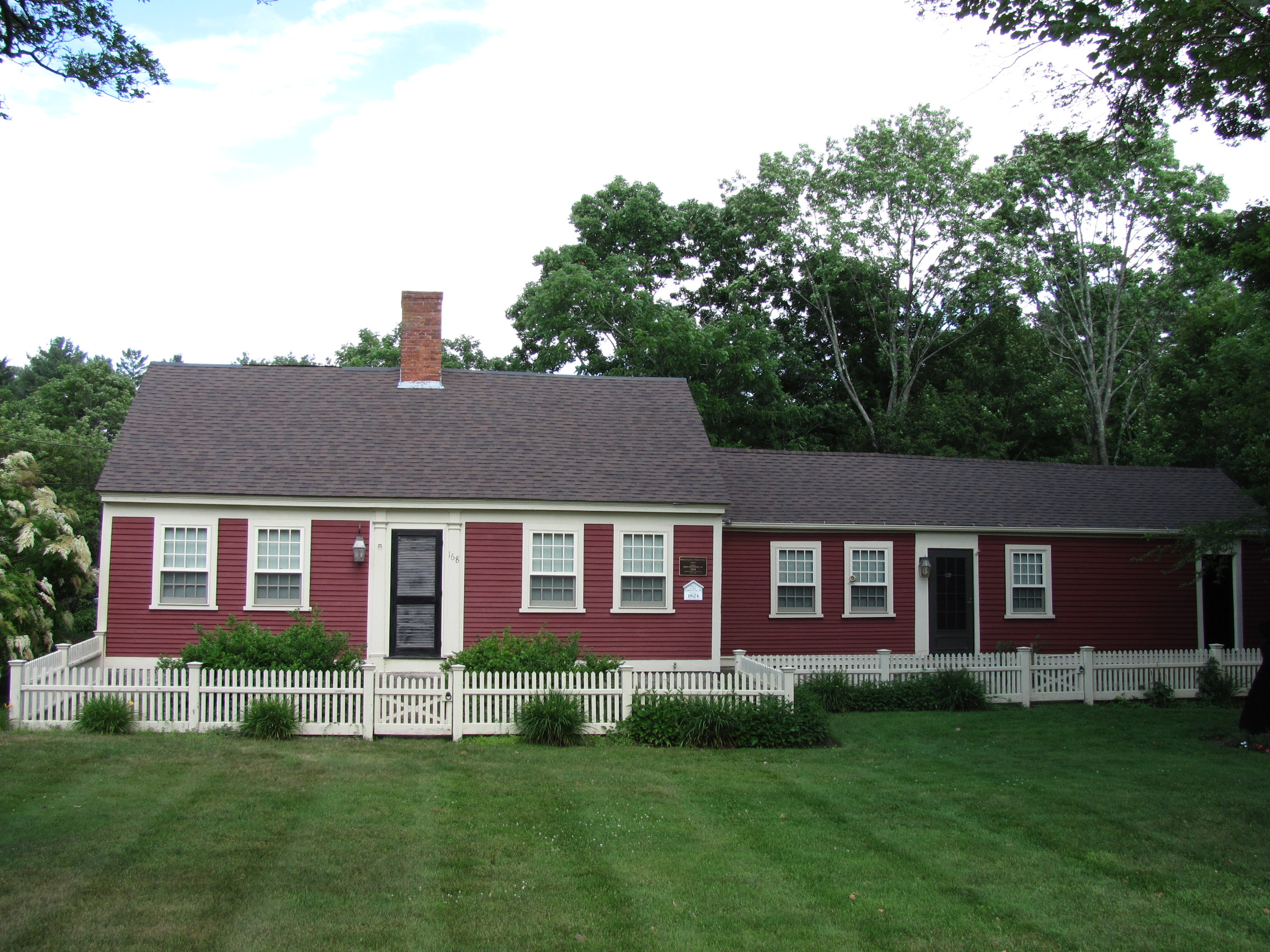
- Ezra Carpenter House

- Location within Massachusetts Location within the United States
- Location: Foxborough, Massachusetts
- Coordinates: 42°3′7″N 71°15′17″W
- Built: 1800
- Architectural style: Federal
- NRHP reference No.: 85000029
- Added to NRHP: January 3, 1985

The Ezra Carpenter House is a historic house at 168 South Street in Foxborough, Massachusetts. The 1 1/2-story Cape style house was built in 1800 by Ezra Carpenter, a veteran of the American Revolutionary War. Later generations of Carpenters also played significant roles in the civic life of the town. The main block of the house is five bays wide, with a centered entry, and an original central chimney. The ell to the right is a later 19th century addition.

The house was listed on the National Register of Historic Places in 1985.

== See also ==
- National Register of Historic Places listings in Norfolk County, Massachusetts
