= George Leonard (American politician) =

American politician (1729–1819)

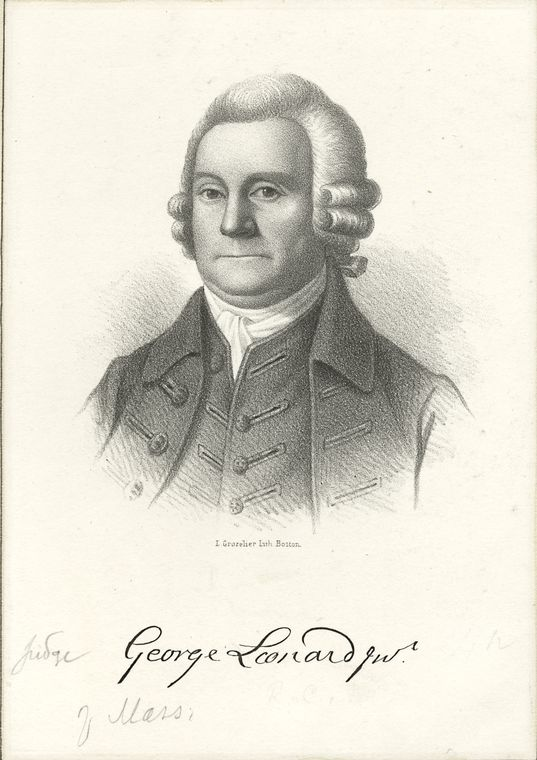

Member of the U.S. House of Representatives from Massachusetts
- In office March 4, 1795 – March 3, 1797
- Preceded by: None (at large)
- Succeeded by: Stephen Bullock
- Constituency: 7th district (1795–97)

Member of the U.S. House of Representatives from Massachusetts
- In office March 4, 1789 – March 3, 1793
- Preceded by: None (new seat)
- Succeeded by: None (at large)
- Constituency: 7th district (1789–91); 6th district (1791–93)

Member of the Massachusetts House of Representatives
- In office 1801–1802

Member of the Massachusetts Senate
- In office 1792–1793

Personal details
- Born: July 4, 1729 Norton, Province of Massachusetts Bay, British America
- Died: July 26, 1819 (aged 90) Raynham, Massachusetts, U.S.
- Party: Pro-Administration; Federalist
- Spouse: Experience (White) Leonard (m. 1759-1819, his death)
- Children: 2
- Education: Harvard College
- Profession: Attorney

George Leonard (July 4, 1729 – July 26, 1819) was an American lawyer, jurist, and politician from Norton, Massachusetts. Besides service on state court benches and in both houses of the state legislature, he represented Massachusetts in the U.S. House of Representatives.

== Biography ==
Leonard was born in Norton, Massachusetts on July 4, 1729, the son of George Leonard (1698–1778) and Rachel (Clapp) Leonard. He was educated locally and graduated from Harvard College in 1748. (Note: In 1753, Leonard received the honorary degree of Master of Arts from Yale College. In 1804, Brown University presented Leonard an honorary LL.D.) Leonard received his Master of Arts degree from Harvard in 1751. He began the study of law while serving as Bristol County's register of probate, an office he held from 1749 to 1783. He was admitted to the bar in 1750 and practiced in Norton. From 1764 to 1766, Leonard served as a member of the Massachusetts Provincial Assembly. From 1770 to 1775 he was a member of the Massachusetts Executive Council.

From 1784 to 1790, Leonard was judge of the probate court in Bristol County. He was judge of the common pleas court 1785 to 1798. Leonard was the court's chief judge from 1798 to 1804. During his career, Leonard held several local offices, including town meeting moderator, town selectman, town clerk and treasurer, town assessor, and commander of the Norton-area militia with the rank of colonel.

In 1788, Leonard was elected to the United States House of Representatives as a Pro-Administration candidate. He was reelected in 1790 and served in the 1st and 2nd U.S. Congresses (March 4, 1789 to March 3, 1793).

Leonard served in the Massachusetts Senate from 1792 to 1793. In 1796, he was again elected to Congress, this time as a Federalist. He served in the 4th Congress, March 4, 1795 to March 3, 1797. In 1801 and 1802, Leonard served in the Massachusetts House of Representatives.

In retirement, Leonard was a resident of Raynham, Massachusetts. He died in Raynham on July 26, 1819. Leonard was buried at Norton Center Cemetery in Norton.

== Family ==
In 1759, Leonard married Experience White (1738–1827). They were the parents of two daughters, Peddy (1761–1850) and Fanny (1762–1779). Peddy Leonard was the second wife of Jabez Bowen. (Note: Peddy Leonard Bowen's unusual first name was a diminutive of her mother's.)

== Notes ==
U.S. House of Representatives
Preceded by None (district inactive)	Member of the U.S. House of Representatives from Massachusetts's 7th congressional district March 4, 1795 – March 3, 1797	Succeeded by Stephen Bullock
Preceded by George Thatcher	Member of the U.S. House of Representatives from Massachusetts's 6th congressional district March 4, 1791 – March 3, 1793	Succeeded by John Reed Sr.
New district	Member of the U.S. House of Representatives from Massachusetts's 7th congressional district March 4, 1789 – March 3, 1791	Succeeded by Artemas Ward
