= James Sansom Carpenter House =

Historic house in Iowa, United States

- U.S. National Register of Historic Places
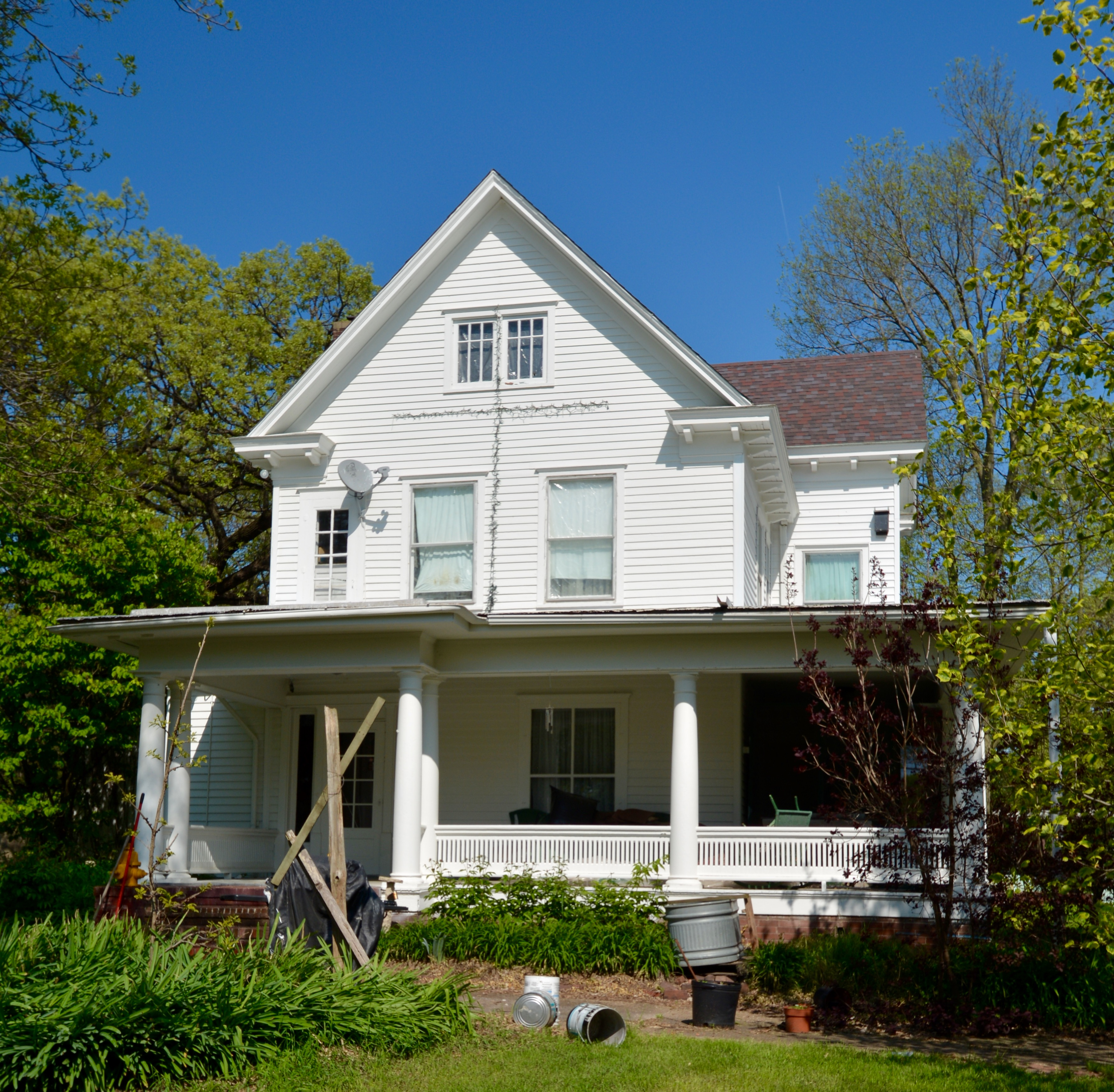

- Location within Iowa
- Location: 3320 Kinsey Ave. Des Moines, Iowa
- Coordinates: 41°36′26″N 93°33′2″W
- Area: less than one acre
- Built: 1890
- Architectural style: Colonial Revival
- NRHP reference No.: 98000379
- Added to NRHP: April 23, 1998

The James Sansom Carpenter House was significant to Des Moines cultural history from 1906 to 1939. The 13 acre property named Oakwood estate by its owners J. S. Carpenter and his Spouse Florence L. Carpenter because of the old growth oak forestation. The Carpenters' collection was deemed by art critics as one of the finest collections of etchings and lithographs in America. The house held the Carpenter collection of 125 paintings and 350 etchings. J. S. Carpenter was also known as Sannie or Sandy after his oddly spelled middle name. J. S. Carpenter, a bridge building magnet, founded the Des Moines Association of Fine Arts in 1916. The Association members each contributed $100.00 annually for the purchase of paintings and sculptures. The members also received a 25% discount on art purchased at Association events. Carpenter was known as the Guru of fine arts by the Des Moines community. Visiting artists and dignitaries came to Des Moines to sell their art and often stayed with the Carpenter's at Oakwood. Carpenter was president of the Association from its inception until his death of heart disease in 1939. The Association transformed into the Edmundson Art Museum in 1940 under the auspices of Association Executive member, and Carpenter's close friend Jay N. (Ding) Darling. Darling as President of the Edmundson Art Foundation merged the original collection into the present day Des Moines Art Center.

== The mansion ==
Carpenter house, built 1890, extensively renovated in the 1920s, is a colonial revival with two and one half stories. It has six bedrooms with a formal front staircase on the west made of quarter-sawn oak and rectilinear panels with square stair spokes. The library has oak built in bookcases, wall panels and dentil cove molding all of quarter-sawn oak. The living room is 17 feet by 33 feet with an oak colonial revival fireplace on the north. The fireplace has matte green Grueby like three inch square tiles. The ceiling of the great room or living room is molded plaster tiles identical to the ceiling of the historic Hoyt Sherman House. Florence Carpenter, a member of the Des Moines Women's club, was on the Hoyt-Sherman building committee in 1923 when the club auditorium was first dedicated. The formal dining room also has wood wall panels and cove molding all of African Teak wood. A servant's call button was present in the middle of the dining room but has since been covered by a brass plate. There is a servant's staircase on the east. After a fire nearly claimed the Carpenters' collection in the 1920s, a fireproof art room was constructed on the North. The fire of November 24, 1922, reported in the Des Moines Tribune, as, "Fire today almost totally destroyed the home of J. S. Carpenter at East Thirty-third street and Cleveland Avenue. Mr. Carpenter had one of the finest art collections in the United States. It is thought that many of these fine oil paintings have been ruined." The room is separated from the house by about three feet of concrete and a double bank vault door. The 17 by 13 foot art room with 11 foot ceilings has 10 inch concrete floors and ceiling. Two windows on the North had bars that were removed at an unknown date, after the carpenter occupation. On humid days, with a strong Northeast wind, the smell of charred wood is present in the second story. The estate was 13 acres during the Carpenter period. The original address of Summit street was changed to 1525 East 33rd street and again changed by development to 3320 Kinsey Avenue. The property was placed on the National Historic Register in 1998 and declared a local Des Moines Landmark by the Des Moines City Council ordinance 2001.

Photo of Carpenter House circa 1914

== The grounds and outbuildings ==
The grounds originally consisted of 13 acres. A servant's house is located to the north, still standing and under private ownership. The servant's quarters were sold off the estate in the 1960s. The land to the east was also sold in the 1960s to development and is now commonly known as Eastwood Drive and East 34th st, Des Moines Iowa. In 1973 the Hawkeye Development Company purchased Oakwood Estate's remaining five acres and subdivided the land into 11 lots. Houses and duplexes were built around the mansion. One lot to the west, commonly known as 1515 East 33rd street, Des Moines Iowa, was left undeveloped for 23 years and acquired for the estate. A low-income-housing duplex to the west commonly known as 1525 East 33rd St was demolished in 2011, with the lot added to the estate in 2012.

== The Carpenters and artist Henry Ossawa Tanner ==
Henry Ossawa Tanner, one of America's first successful African American Artists, was a close friend of J. S. Carpenter. How they met is unknown, but it probably was on a buying trip to New York or while Carpenter studied art in France, based on anecdotal evidence. The friendship started as a business relationship. Carpenter wanted a Tanner canvas for the Association of Fine Arts. Carpenter was enthralled with Tanner's works in general. Carpenter wanted to place as many Tanner's works in Des Moines as possible. Part was his love of the style and part the appeal to the consumer. Carpenter brokered paintings for Tanner at a 25% commission. Carpenter often begged Tanner to send more paintings to Des Moines for placement. The best example of their true friendship came in 19** when Carpenter was shopping for art in New Youk City. Carpenter came upon a large Tanner canvas at a gallery. The price was not what Tanner would usually receive. Carpenter believed the canvas was acquired by nefarious means. Carpenter contacted Tanner, who was then living in France, to ask if the canvas was stolen. Carpenter discovered that Tanner stored six pictures with an art warehouse. The business closed and the owner took the pictures to another storage area. The owner died with his widow auctioning the paintings off and keeping the money for herself. Carpenter took it upon himself to seek out the auctioned Tanner canvases and recover as many as possible. Carpenter expended his own funds for the entire recovery process at a cost of $?. The ordeal started in 19** and by 19** the cost of recovery totaled. Tanner paid him back from the proceeds of the sales 19**. The letters that followed this misadventure revealed a trusting friendship. Tanner assisted Carpenter in acquiring the Hand of Rodan for $1,000.00 along with provenance for the Fine Arts Association. A bronze that is still in the Des Moines Art Center collection. Tanner also bid at auctions for Carpenter's friends and for Carpenter. Carpenter gave Tanner free rein to bid on, "a large work, from a big artist at a small price." In Tanner's final year of life he confided in Carpenter that many canvases were in the studio but he had not the strength to complete the work. Tanner referenced a new Tempera mix for which he was very excited. In Carpenter's final letter to Tanner, 1936, Carpenter noted two weeks in Chicago for medical treatment and the stagnant art market. Carpenter and Tanner demonstrated a true and trusted friendship to their final days of life.

Of note is eye witness accounts of cross burnings in the 1920s just three blocks south of Carpenter's Oakwood Estate. The Ku Klux Klan would ride their steel shod horses East down the brick paved East University Street and then turn North toward Carpenter's house to a horse pasture on the highest hill near today's East 34th street and Dubuque Avenue, Des Moines Iowa. There, the white cloaked KKK members would burn their cross. There is no information indicating this as a warning to Carpenter for selling a "Negro's" paintings. Nothing in the news or Carpenter's correspondence indicate he was distracted from selling Tanner paintings. To the contrary, Carpenter was an aggressive promoter of Tanner works.

== The Carpenters and artist Leon Kroll ==
Artist Leon Kroll and his wife visited Des Moines and stayed with the Carpenter's at Oakwood. Extensive correspondence exists between J. S. Carpenter and Leon Kroll at the Archives of American Art.

== The Carpenters' Richard E. Miller painting, Goldfish ==
The Carpenters owned a very rare painting by artist Richard E. Miller titled Goldfish, circa 1912. The subject was Miller's wife and daughter. Miller's daughter died shortly after the painting was completed. The painting was inherited by Carpenter's niece. In 1990 the niece offered Goldfish to the Des Moines Art Center. With little research, the Art Center rejected the offer. The Art Center already had an example of Richard Miller's work. The Art Center failed to recognize the importance of the painting in that it depicted the artist's last painting of his daughter. Carpenter's niece donated the painting to her alma mater Simpson College, Indianola, Iowa with full knowledge of the painting's value. Simpson college sent Goldfish to Sotheby's auction house for sale in New York 1992.
