= 1945 Academy Awards =

1945 Academy Awards may refer to:

- 17th Academy Awards, the Academy Awards ceremony that took place in 1945
- 18th Academy Awards, the 1946 ceremony honoring the best in film for 1945
