= Carpenter's Rock House =

Coordinates: 36.62001°N 84.92436°W

Carpenter's Rock House is a large rock shelter in Wayne County, Kentucky, United States. It is named for Benjamin Carpenter, an American Revolutionary War veteran who settled ca. 1785. on Carpenter Fork of Otter Creek in the central part of the county, which borders Tennessee to the south.
