= Reid–Jones–Carpenter House =

Historic house in Georgia, United States

- U.S. National Register of Historic Places
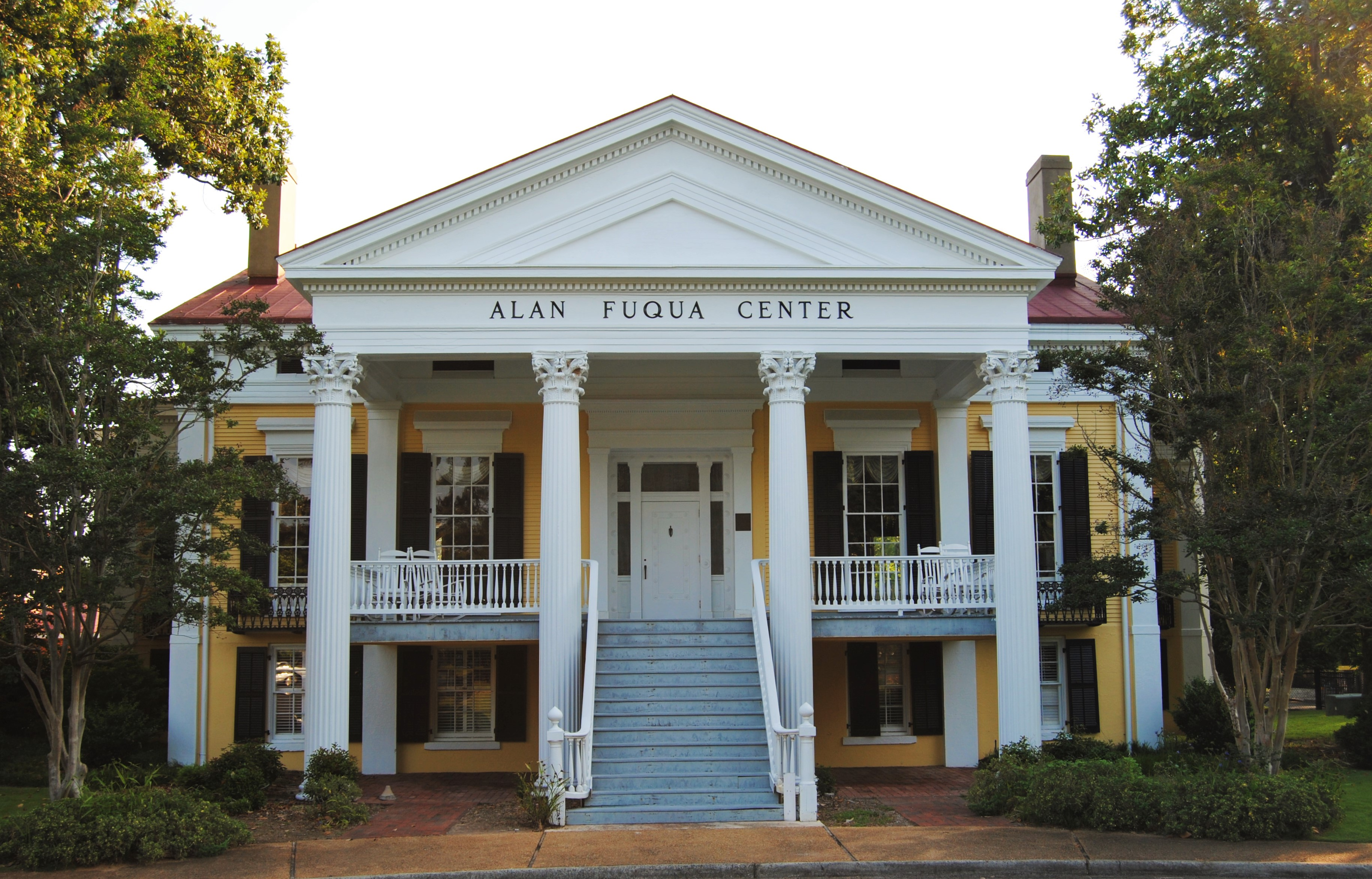

- Location within Georgia Location within the United States
- Location: 2249 Walton Way, Augusta, Georgia
- Coordinates: 33°28′41″N 82°0′56″W
- Area: less than one acre
- Built: 1849
- Architectural style: Greek Revival
- NRHP reference No.: 79000745
- Added to NRHP: November 13, 1979

The Reid–Jones–Carpenter House, located at 2249 Walton Way, Augusta, Richmond County, Georgia, constructed in 1849, is a single story wood-frame building on raised basement of stuccoed brick. The house was listed on the National Register of Historic Places on November 13, 1979.

== Architecture ==
The house features an entrance portico supported by fluted Corinthian-inspired columns based at ground level and reached by a long stairway. The porch is enclosed by a balustrade. Windows flanking the portico have wrought iron ledges. Formerly known as "Montrose", the home is now the Alan Fuqua Center for young people, associated with the Reid Memorial Presbyterian Church. In the mid-1900s, it was the home of Charles Colcock Jones Carpenter, son of the Rev. Samuel B. Carpenter and Ruth (Jones) Carpenter, and grandson of Charles Colcock Jones, Jr., distinguished lawyer, author, and historian.
