= Carpenter Schools =

Historic buildings in Natchez, Mississippi, United States

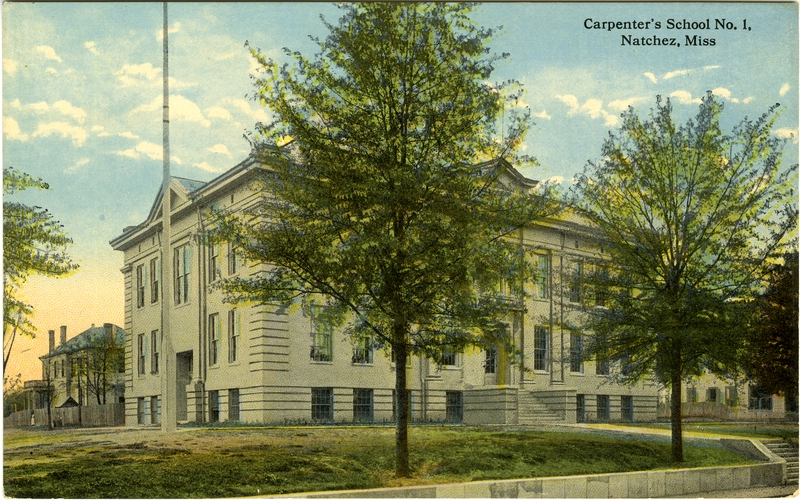
- An early 20th-century postcard of Carpenter School No. 1

- Location within Mississippi Location within the United States
- 31.564366°N 91.396846°W
- Location: 706 N Union St (#1) and 800 Washington St (#2), Natchez, Mississippi

History
- Built: 1909

Site notes
- Architect: Reuben Harrison Hunt
- Architectural style: Colonial Revival

Mississippi Landmark
- Official name: Carpenter School No. 1
- Designated: January 7, 1993
- Reference no.: 001-NAT-1355-NRD-ML

U.S. Historic district – Contributing property
- Official name: Carpenter School No. 1
- Designated: December 1, 1983
- Part of: Upriver Residential District
- Reference no.: 83004371

Mississippi Landmark
- Official name: Carpenter School No. 2
- Designated: May 9, 1985
- Reference no.: 001-NAT-0671-NRD-ML

Built in the early 20th century, Carpenter School No. 1 and Carpenter School No. 2, in Natchez, Mississippi, were two of three buildings built and donated to the city by the city's philanthropic Carpenter family (see below) for public schools in Natchez. Besides the three schools, the family built and then donated many other structures to the city, and the Natchez-Adams School District and George W. Armstrong Public Library still benefit from a Carpenter trust fund.

A $2.1 million restoration of Carpenter No. 1 was completed in 2000. Because the building is listed as a contributing property to a historic district on the National Register of Historic Places, the exterior of the building was not altered by the restoration. The restoration rounded out the city's initiative begun by a former mayor to restore and adapt large, unused municipal properties. Renovations to Carpenter No. 2 on Washington Street, which served as the Natchez Senior Citizen Multi-Purpose Center, were completed in November, 2000.

== Carpenter Family of Natchez ==
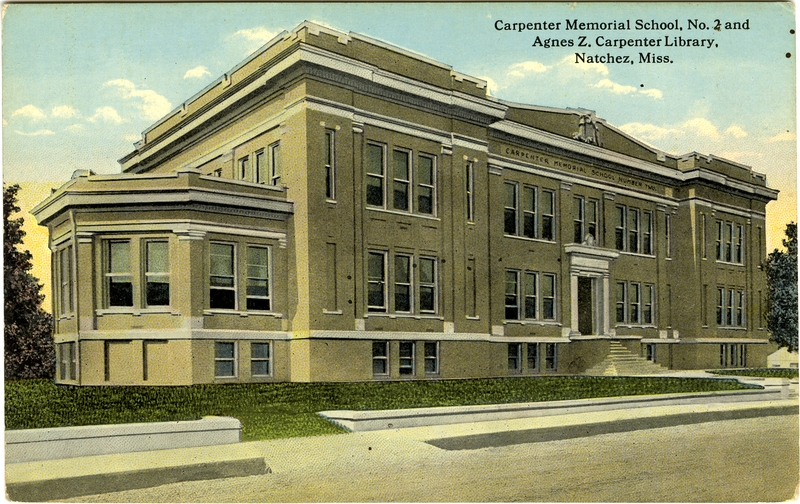
An early 20th-century postcard of Carpenter School No. 2

The Carpenter family in Natchez descends from Nathaniel L. Carpenter, who was born 18 Nov 1805 at Randolph, Vermont, a descendant of the Rehoboth Carpenter family. Nathaniel L. Carpenter was raised and educated in Lancaster, New York, and went into the stage and hotel business there. In 1833 he journeyed to Natchez, Mississippi, and began a career as a builder. He left Natchez in 1834 and went first to St. Louis, Missouri, then to New Orleans, Louisiana, in 1835. He returned to Natchez about 1838 and settled permanently, becoming owner of a line of steamboats and successful in the cotton trade and many other private and public interests. He married in 1837 at Buffalo, New York, to Miss Julia Ann Luce. He led a very full life, traveling throughout the United States, Europe, and the South Pacific islands. He owned the Myrtle Terrace town home in Natchez, and Dunleith plantation near Natchez, both of which are on the annual Natchez historical pilgrimage tours. During the Civil War, he counseled neutrality, but both of his sons joined the Confederacy—Allen D. Carpenter served in the Natchez Rifles and Joseph N. Carpenter in the Breckinridge Guards. Julia Ann (Luce) Carpenter died on 1 May 1871, and Nathaniel L. Carpenter died on 23 Dec 1892. Descendants have continued to live in Natchez. The town of Carpenter, Mississippi in Copiah County, is named for J. N. Carpenter, president of the Natchez, Jackson and Columbia Railroad.
