= Experiment Perilous =

1944 film by Jacques Tourneur

- Theatrical release poster
- Directed by: Jacques Tourneur
- Screenplay by: Warren Duff
- Based on: Experiment Perilous; 1943 novel by Margaret Carpenter
- Produced by: Warren Duff
- Starring: Hedy Lamarr; George Brent; Paul Lukas; Albert Dekker; Carl Esmond
- Cinematography: Tony Gaudio
- Edited by: Ralph Dawson
- Music by: Roy Webb
- Distributed by: RKO Pictures
- Release date: December 29, 1944 (U.S.)
- Running time: 91 minutes
- Country: United States
- Language: English

Experiment Perilous is a 1944 American melodrama film set in 1903. The film is based on a 1943 novel of the same name by Margaret Carpenter, and directed by Jacques Tourneur. Albert S. D'Agostino, Jack Okey, Darrell Silvera, and Claude E. Carpenter were nominated for an Academy Award for Best Art Direction-Interior Decoration, Black-and-White. Hedy Lamarr's singing voice was dubbed by Paula Raymond.

== Plot ==
The story takes place in 1903. During a train trip, psychiatrist Dr. Huntington Bailey meets a friendly older lady, when she turns to him for reassurance during a torrential downpour. She tells him that she is going to visit her brother Nick and his lovely young wife Allida, both of whom she effectively raised. Once in New York, Bailey hears that his train companion suddenly died while visiting her brother for tea. Shortly afterwards, he meets the strange couple and becomes suspicious of Nick's treatment of his wife. Nick keeps Allida, whom he is trying to pass off as crazy, a virtual prisoner in their town house (a New York brownstone in the film), cutting off all contact with the outside world. The kindly Bailey takes it upon himself to attempt to free his new love, Allida, from the control of the insanely jealous Nick.

A frenzied fight between Bailey and Nick in the Bederaux home is followed by a gus furnace explostion featuring the memorable destruction of several large aquariums, replete with shattered glass and gushing water. The house burns to the ground because of Nick's actions, killing him, but Allida, her son, and Bailey end up living happily in the country.

== Cast ==
- Hedy Lamarr as Allida Bederaux
- George Brent as Dr. Huntington Bailey
- Paul Lukas as Nick Bederaux
- Albert Dekker as Clag, sculptor
- Carl Esmond as Maitland, painter
- Olive Blakeney as Cissie Bederaux
- George N. Neise as Alec Gregory, writer
- Margaret Wycherly as Maggie
- Stephanie Bachelor as Elaine
- Mary Servoss as Miss Wilson
- Julia Dean as Deria
- Sam McDaniel as Train Porter
- William Post Jr. as District Attorney
- Bill Ward as young Alec Bederaux (Nick & Allida's son)

== Production notes ==
The production dates for the film were July 12 through early October 1944.

According to pre-production news items in The Hollywood Reporter, this film originally was to be produced by David Hempstead and star Cary Grant. After Hempstead terminated his contract with RKO, Grant dropped out of the project, and Robert Fellows was assigned to produce it. Gregory Peck then was slated to star in the male lead, but a prior commitment to David O. Selznick productions forced him to withdraw.

To create the snow storm sequence, the studio used 100 tons of ice and six wind machines.

== Radio adaptations ==
Experiment Perilous was presented on Screen Guild Players on October 12, 1946. Brent reprised his screen role, and Joan Bennett and Adolphe Menjou co-starred. George Brent reprised his role in a Lux Radio Theatre broadcast on September 10, 1945, co-starring Virginia Bruce.

== Modern culture ==
Released in the same year as the more famous Gaslight, both films share the theme of a domineering husband manipulating his wife's reality through various forms of harassment, false flags and cruelty. In both films the heroine is admonished by the husband for suffering delusions until she is rescued by a concerned suitor. This form of psychological abuse eventually came to be known as gaslighting, in reference to that film.

== See also ==
- List of American films of 1944
- Gaslighting – Type of psychological manipulation
