= Captain Nathan Carpenter House =

Historic house in Alabama, United States

- U.S. National Register of Historic Places
- Alabama Register of Landmarks and Heritage
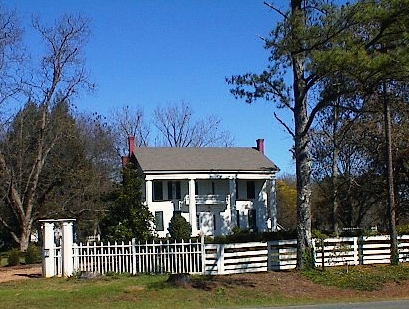
- Everhope in 2003

- Location within Alabama Location within the United States
- Nearest city: Eutaw, Alabama
- Coordinates: 32°54′5″N 87°58′12″W
- Built: 1853
- Architect: Anthony, David Rinehart
- Architectural style: Greek Revival
- NRHP reference No.: 99000793

Significant dates
- Added to NRHP: July 23, 1999
- Designated ARLH: December 21, 1977

Everhope, known throughout most of its history as the Captain Nathan Carpenter House and more recently as Twin Oaks Plantation, is a historic plantation house near Eutaw, Alabama, United States. Completed in 1853 for Nathan Mullin Carpenter, it is listed on the National Register of Historic Places and Alabama Register of Landmarks and Heritage due to its architectural and historical significance.

== History ==
Nathan Mullin Carpenter's family migrated from Franklin County, North Carolina, to Greene County, Alabama, in the early 1820s. He was born on December 22, 1826. He served with the Eutaw Rangers during the Mexican–American War. Carpenter married twice, first to Catherine Cockrell on September 7, 1848, who died from yellow fever soon after in 1849. He married a second time on January 8, 1851, to Marjorie Pippen.

Nathan and Marjorie Carpenter purchased 667 acres (2.70 km^{2}) of land for $10,012 (~$296,299 in 2024) on September 28, 1852, from John and Anna Rice. The plantation's main house was built from 1852 to 1853 by a local builder, David Rinehart Anthony. Anthony's own house, built later in nearby Eutaw, bears a strong resemblance to the Carpenter house. The Carpenter house itself was an almost perfect replication of Pippen Place, built several years earlier by Marjorie's family. Nathan and Marjorie would raise eight children in the house, five before the American Civil War and three after it.

Carpenter organized a company of men called the Confederate Rangers on the lawn in front of the house in 1862.

The house was inherited by the Carpenters' unmarried daughter, Fannie. A nephew of Fannie, Clifford S. Boyce, inherited the house following her death in 1944. Boyce and his wife, Leah Graves, lived in the house until his death in 1974. The house sat empty until purchased by the Dr. George E. Rudd family in 1977. The house was listed on the Alabama Register of Landmarks and Heritage on December 21, 1977, following its purchase by the Rudds. A holdover from earlier times, the house still did not have running water or bathrooms, with the Rudd family only using it as a weekend and holiday retreat. Their absentee ownership continued into the early 1990s, with the house suffering periodic vandalism.

The Carpenter house was purchased by Charles and Jan Bullock in 1994, along with the surrounding property. Renaming the place Twin Oaks Plantation, the Bullocks began a long program of restoration and adding modern conveniences to the house. The house was added to the National Register of Historic Places on July 23, 1999, during the Bullocks' ownership. It was subsequently purchased by David and Pam Harmon in 2005. The "twin oaks", for which the previous owners had named the plantation, died soon after the Harmons bought the property. This led them to rename the plantation Everhope. They continued the restoration and preservation of the historic house.

== Architecture ==
The Greek Revival style house is a two-story wood-frame structure with a side-gabled roof covering the portico and main block of the structure. The foundations and chimneys are built in brick. The front elevation features a two-story portico supported by four monumentally-scaled octagonal columns. The portico spans the entire front of the house, covering all five bays of the facade. Double doors with sidelights occupy the central bay of each floor, with a cantilevered governor's balcony projecting from the second level.
