= John B. Carpenter House =

Historic house in New York, United States

- U.S. National Register of Historic Places
- Location within New York Location within the United States
- Location: 128 Prospec Ave., Plattsburgh, New York
- Coordinates: 44°42′2″N 73°28′24″W
- Area: less than one acre
- Built: 1845
- Architect: Carpenter, John B.
- MPS: Plattsburgh City MRA
- NRHP reference No.: 82001100
- Added to NRHP: November 12, 1982

The John B. Carpenter House is a historic house located at 128 Prospect Avenue in Plattsburgh, Clinton County, New York.It was bought and restored by its present owner and resident Ron Giambruno in 1969 who removed the stucco covering the outside of the house, sandblasting and repointing the structure.He continues to live there with his wife Sara making the home a residence for only two different families since 1845.

== Description and history ==
It was built in about 1845 and is a 1 1/2-story, rectangular-plan building. It sits on a stone foundation and features a gable roof.

It was listed on the National Register of Historic Places on November 12, 1982.
