= Carpenter House (Plano, Texas) =

Coordinates: 33.0215°N 96.6966°W

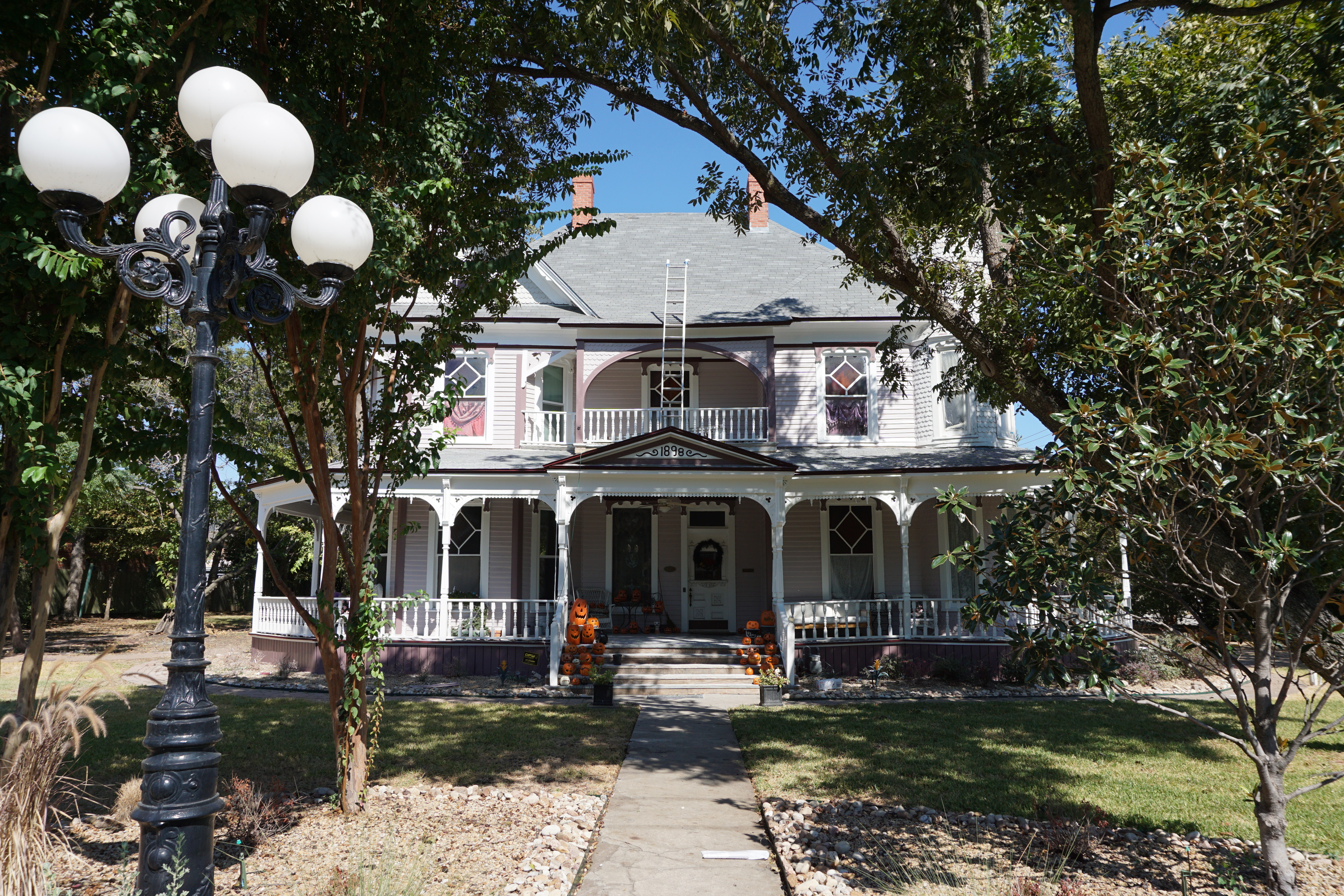
The Carpenter House in 2015

The Carpenter House, 1211 East 16th Street, Plano, Collin County, Texas, is a Victorian home built in 1898 for Col. Henry C. Overaker and his new bride. Three years in completion, the house was set in the middle of a former cotton field which was part of the colonel's many land holdings. Gibson Edgar Carpenter, a gentleman farmer, lawyer, and judge, purchased the house in the early 1920s to ensure his children would receive the best education in the Plano school system. Carpenter Middle School, named for Carpenter’s father Robert Washington Carpenter, is located on land formerly owned by the family. A video history of the house in its current state is accessible at this referenced link. The house is notable for its unique architecture, its rare survival into the 21st Century as an intact homeplace, and its association with a family noted for its civic service to the local community.
