= Col. Thomas Carpenter III House =

Historic house in Massachusetts, United States

- Col. Thomas Carpenter III
- U.S. National Register of Historic Places
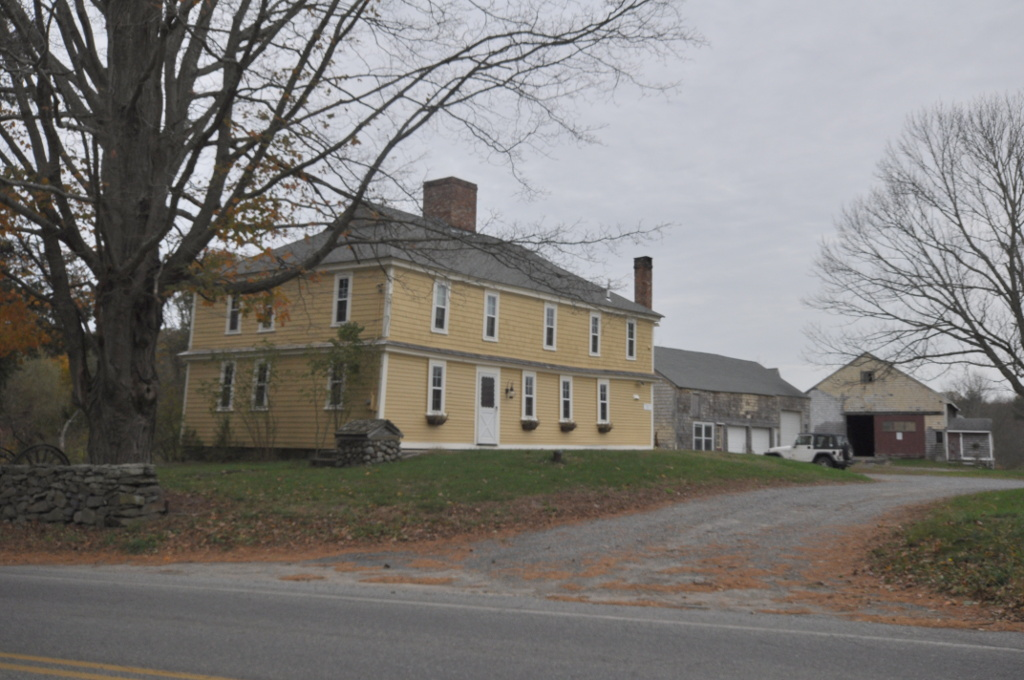

- Location within Massachusetts Location within the United States
- Location: 77 Bay State Rd., Rehoboth, Massachusetts
- Coordinates: 41°50′40″N 71°14′36″W
- Built: 1755
- Architectural style: Georgian
- MPS: Rehoboth MRA
- NRHP reference No.: 83000644
- Added to NRHP: June 6, 1983

The Col. Thomas Carpenter III House is a historic house at 77 Bay State Road in Rehoboth, Massachusetts.

The Georgian architecture style house was built in 1755 and added to the National Register of Historic Places in 1983.

== Family ==
Thomas Carpenter was born October 24, 1733, in Rehoboth, Bristol County, Massachusetts and died April 26, 1807, in Rehoboth. He married on December 26, 1754, Elizabeth Moulton (born 1736 Bristol County, Massachusetts, died May 17, 1804, in Rehoboth) and they moved into the newly built house now on 77 Bay State Road before it was fully finished in September 1755. On December 22, 1755, their first daughter Elizabeth was born in their new home.

By August 1776 they would have twelve children born in the now historic house. Unfortunately, several children would also die within the walls of their home. These were an unknown child in 1759, Sarah in 1775 who was age 15, William in 1763 as an infant, James in 1764 as an infant, and Nathan in 1772 who died as an infant. Another Nathan, age 12½, in 1789 may have died due to an accident outside the house. Those children who reached maturity were Elizabeth (born 1755), Thomas (born 1758), Stephen (born 1765), James (born 1767), Rebecca (born 1769), and Peter (born 1772).

Colonel Thomas Carpenter was the son of Thomas Carpenter (born 1692 and died 1779 in Rehoboth) and Mary Barstow (born about 1696 and died 1783 in Rehoboth) and he was the great great grandson of the William Carpenter the immigrant who was born in England in 1605 of the Rehoboth Carpenter family).

== See also ==
Two other Carpenter houses still stand in Rehoboth:

- Christopher Carpenter House
- Carpenter House (Rehoboth, Massachusetts)
- National Register of Historic Places listings in Bristol County, Massachusetts
