= Carpenter House (Richland Parish, Louisiana) =

Coordinates: 32.4217°N 91.7620°W

Carpenter House in Richland Parish, Louisiana is a historic antebellum structure near Delhi, Louisiana that served during the 1850s as a popular inn on the Vicksburg, Mississippi to Monroe, Louisiana stagecoach line. It is of one-story gabled frame construction set on brick pillars, with six square wooden columns, unique for the five thicknesses of sheathing and lining that encase its log walls.

The house's history includes associations with the outlaw Jesse James and American Civil War General Alexander Chambers of the Union Army. Legend holds that the house was named for an outlaw named Samuel Carpenter who led the infamous Cave-in-Rock Bandits and was slain near Vidalia, Louisiana in 1803. However, historical research suggests that when stagecoach service began on the public road through the area in 1849, horses were changed at Charles Carpenter's house.
