= Christopher Carpenter House =

Historic house in Massachusetts, United States

- U.S. National Register of Historic Places
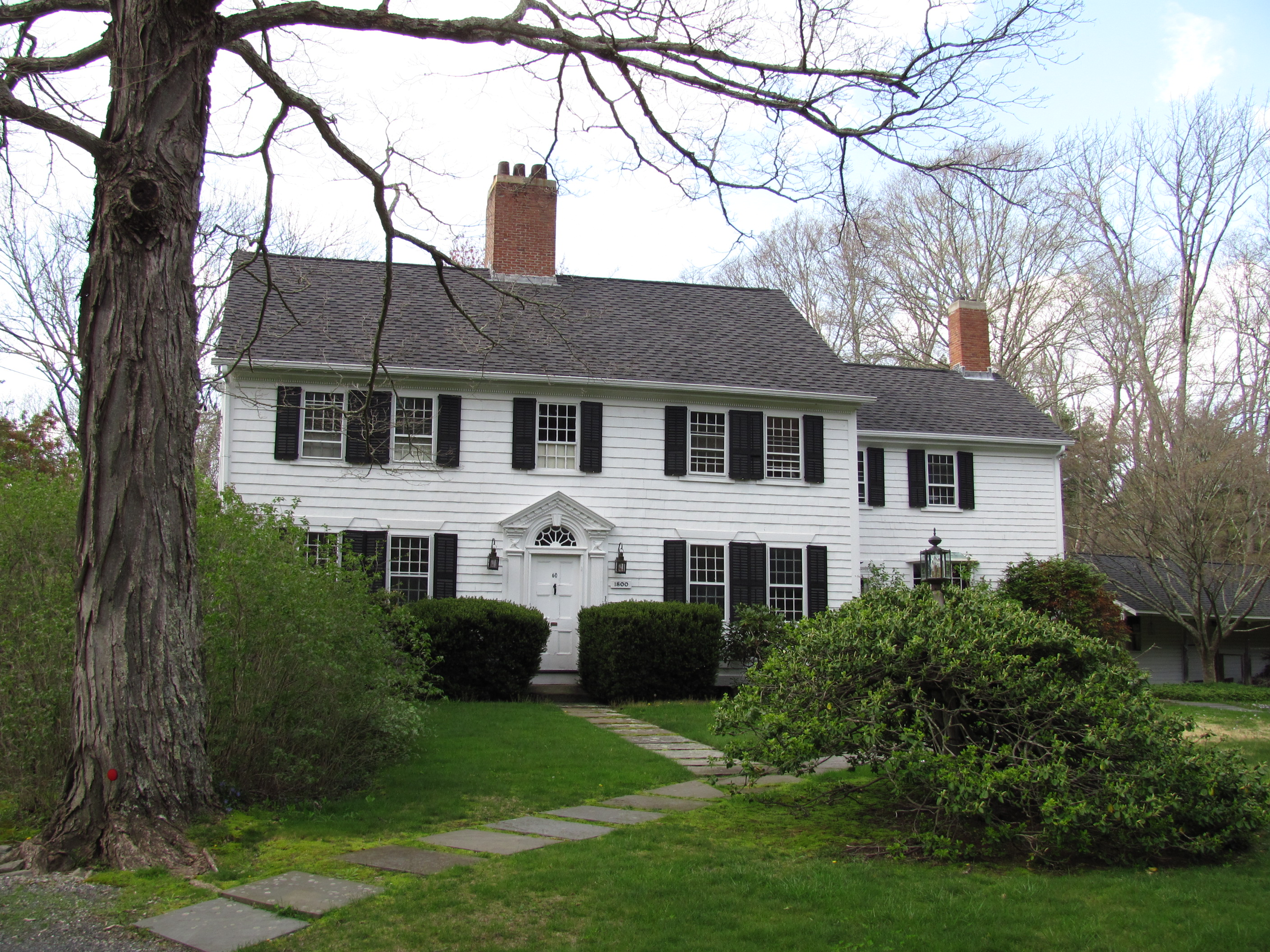
- Christopher Carpenter House

- Location within Massachusetts Location within the United States
- Location: 60 Carpenter St., Rehoboth, Massachusetts
- Coordinates: 41°51′21″N 71°15′6″W
- Built: 1800
- Architect: Carpenter, Thomas, III
- Architectural style: Federal
- MPS: Rehoboth MRA
- NRHP reference No.: 83000643
- Added to NRHP: June 6, 1983

The Christopher Carpenter House is a historic house at 60 Carpenter Street in Rehoboth, Massachusetts. Built about 1800, it is a particularly fine local example of Federal period architecture. It was listed on the National Register of Historic Places in 1983.

== Description and history ==
The Christopher Carpenter House is located in a rural area of central Rehoboth, on the north side of Carpenter Street, about halfway between its endpoints at Perryville Road and Danforth Street. It is a 2 1/2-story wood-frame structure, with a side-gable roof, central chimney, and clapboarded exterior. It has a five-bay front facade, with a center entrance, whose fine surround includes pilasters supporting a pediment, and a delicately traced fanlight design. Interior features include molded finishes in the left front parlor, and bake ovens on both floors of the central chimney. A kitchen ell extends to the east, also with a chimney housing an oven.

This house was built about 1800, possibly by Deacon Thomas Carpenter (aka Thomas Carpenter III in local histories), who gave 35 acres (14 ha) of land to his grandson Christopher in that year. There is evidence that the property has for a much longer period seen active use, and this house may incorporate elements of an older structure. The house remained in the Carpenter family until about 1871.

== See also ==
Two other Carpenter family houses in Rehoboth:

- Col. Thomas Carpenter III House
- Carpenter House (Rehoboth, Massachusetts), nearby on Carpenter Street
- National Register of Historic Places listings in Bristol County, Massachusetts
