= Carpenter House (Rehoboth, Massachusetts) =

Historic house in Massachusetts, United States

- U.S. National Register of Historic Places
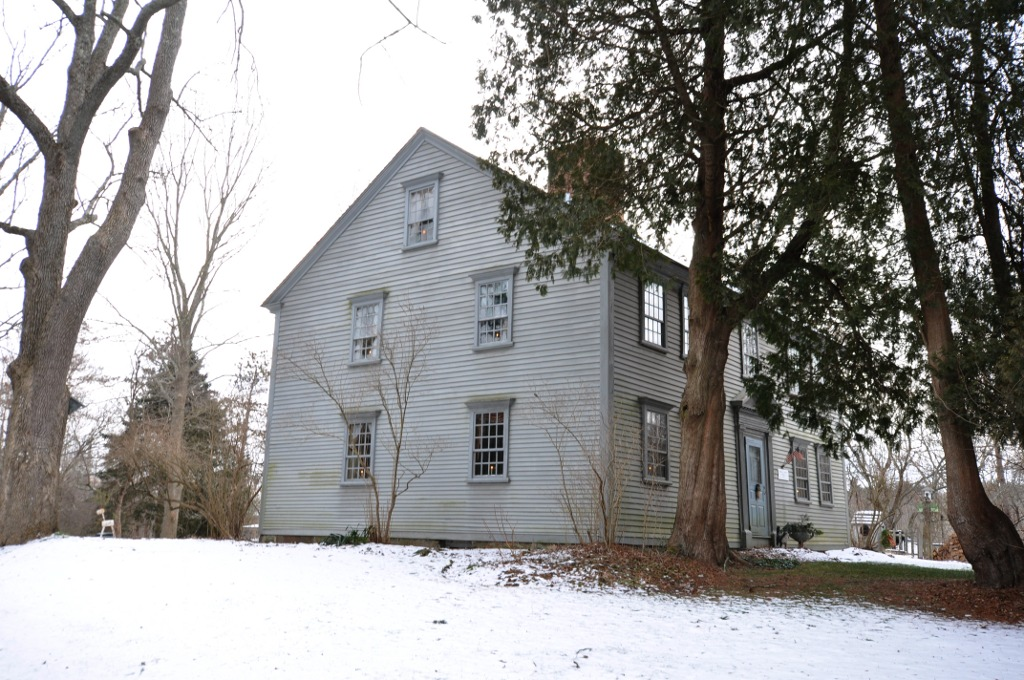

- Location within Massachusetts Location within the United States
- Location: Rehoboth, Massachusetts
- Coordinates: 41°51′17″N 71°15′17″W
- Built: 1789
- Architect: Carpenter, Thomas, III
- Architectural style: Georgian, Federal
- MPS: Rehoboth MRA
- NRHP reference No.: 83000642
- Added to NRHP: June 6, 1983

The Carpenter House is a historic house at 89 Carpenter Street in Rehoboth, Massachusetts. The two-story wood-frame house was probably built in 1789 by Thomas Carpenter III, reusing elements of an older (c. 1750) structure that is known to have stood at the site. The house is one of several locally distinctive houses designed with kitchen fireplaces on both floors. It remained in the Carpenter family until 1900.

The house was listed on the National Register of Historic Places in 1983.

== See also ==
Two other listed "Carpenter" properties in Rehoboth:

- Christopher Carpenter House
- Col. Thomas Carpenter III House
- National Register of Historic Places listings in Bristol County, Massachusetts
