= Appel du 18 joint =

1976 manifesto in France

The Appel du 18 joint is a manifesto calling for the legalization of cannabis in France, published on 18 June 1976 in the daily Libération.

In 1993, the Cannabis Information and Research Collective brought out the text of the appeal to make it a petition; since then it has organized annual gatherings on 18 June, to challenge public opinion and relaunch the debate on the prohibition of cannabis.

== Content of the original appeal ==
Its name is a play on words between the appeal of 18 June and the word "joint", usually designating cannabis cigarettes.

The text began as follows: “Cigarettes, pastis, aspirin, coffee, red wine, sedatives are part of our daily life. On the other hand, a simple “joint” of cannabis can lead you to prison or to a psychiatrist.” The manifesto called for "the total decriminalization of cannabis, its use, its possession, its cultivation (self-production) or its introduction on French territory in quantity of current consumption". The text clearly specifies that it does not call for consumption but for the end of a policy which denies the subject. The signatories then demanded the establishment of legislation identical to that of the Netherlands, which has tolerated the sale and consumption of cannabis since 1976. Many personalities from the entertainment world, intellectuals, and doctors have signed this text.

=== Partial list of the 1976 signatories ===
Among the signatories of the appeal are: Jean Jacques Abrahams, Bernard Kouchner, Henri Leclerc, Gilles Deleuze, Philippe Sollers, Bernadette Lafont, Bertrand Tavernier, Isabelle Huppert, Philippe Druillet, Jean-François Bizot, Les Cahiers du cinéma, André Glucksmann, Gotlib, Jean-Pierre Kalfon, Léon Mercadet, Philippe Val, Christiane Rochefort, Félix Guattari, Edgar Morin, Maxime Le Forestier, Valérie Lagrange, Romain Bouteille, Pierre Barouh, Yvan Dautin, Zouzou, Roland Topor, Bulle Ogier, Colette Magny, Marjorie Alessandrini, Pierre Bourgeade, François Béranger, Jacques Baratier, Jacques-Laurent Bost, Jeannette Colombel, Jean Chesneaux, Copi, Pierre Clémenti, Jean Carpentier, Louis-Jean Calvet, Charles Duits, Marc Dachy, Gérard Fromanger, Patrick Font, Philippe Fourastié, Alain Geismar, Gébé, Gir, Jean-Francis Held, Dominique Issermann, Alain Jaubert, Benoît Jacquot, Alain Kan, Jean-Marc Lévy-Leblond, Jean-François Lyotard, François de Negroni, Mandryka, Marc'O, Nicole Muchnik, Gilles Nicoulaud, Richard Pinhas, Severo Sarduy, Jérôme Savary, Patrice Van Eersel, Joan-Pau Verdier et François Châtelet.

== Gathering of 18 Joint ==
The IARC, an association created in 1991, took up the idea in 1993, by organizing a meeting in Paris and Lyon every 18 June to demand the legalization of cannabis.

From the 2010s, gatherings have multiplied in the provinces ( Toulouse, Tours, Saint-Denis de La Réunion, Lille, etc.).

Besides the festive and convivial aspect of the gatherings, the 18th joint is one of the rare occasions to discuss drugs publicly. Thus, many personalities occasionally join the meeting of 18 Joint, including some political representatives.

== Meetings in 2013 ==
In 2013, gatherings took place in different cities of France for the appeal of the 18 Joint:

- Paris - Large lawn of La Villette, on 18 June at 18 hours.
- Lyon - Grande prairie, Gerland park (Lyon 7 th ), at 6 p.m.
- Toulouse - Parc Compans, on 18 June at 18 hours.
- Lille - Matisse Garden, on 18 June at 18 hours.
- La Roche-sur-Yon - Prefecture Square, 6 p.m.
- Papeete ( Tahiti ) - Bougainville Park, at 4 p.m.
- St Leu (Reunion) - La Falaise, from 4 p.m. to 9 p.m.
- Brive la Gaillarde - Place de La Guierle, at 6 p.m.

=== Petition ===
A petition partly repeating the original appeal, but including new parameters such as medical cannabis was also launched by the IARC and recently collected more than 19,000 signatures.

==== Partial list of signatories of CIRC petition ====
Act-Up, Jean-Pierre Andrevon, Laurent Appel (journaliste), Christine Baudillon (réalisatrice), Patrick Beauverie (médecin membre de la Commission nationale des stupéfiants et des psychotropes), Frédéric Beigbeder, Jean-Luc Benhamias, Olivier Besancenot, Black Bomb A, Jean-Paul Bourre, Jean-Pierre Bouyxou, Lionel Broye, Burning Heads, Pierre Cattan (rédacteur en chef de Toc), Francis Caballero, Eric Chapel (Chanvre et Cie), Chester (dessinateur), Chiche ! (mouvement de jeunes écologistes), Yves Cochet, Colle François-Xavier (psychologue), Colson Renaud (Maitre de conférences en droit / Nantes), Coppel Anne (sociologue), Corbier François (Auteur-compositeur-interprète), Sergio Coronado (porte-parole des Verts), Arnaud Debouté, Chloë des Lysses, Benoît Delépine, Cécile Duflot, Alain Dugrand, Patrick Eudeline (écrivain et musicien), FA, Fillias Edouard (président d'Alternative Libérale), André Furst, Jean-Pierre Galland, Jean-Marc Geidel (médecin), JP Géné, Farid Ghehiouèche (responsible du groupe Drogues des Verts), Laurent Gourarier, Guizmo, Hilight Tribe, High Tone, Illouz (avocat), Jean Elvire (éditions Trouble-Fête), Joj-O (batteur de Mickey 3D), Ferid Kaddour, Kaophonic Tribu (musiciens), Siegfried Kessler, Jan Kounen, Kriiizzz, Kshoo, François Lagarde, Le Peuple de l'Herbe, Les Jeunes Verts, Alain Lipietz, Lofofora, Noël Mamère, Philippe Manœuvre, Léon Mercadet, Michka (écrivain), Mouvement des jeunes socialistes, MLC (mouvement de légalisation contrôlé), Mathilde Monnier, Pierre Ouin, Fabrice Olivet (ASUD), Joep Oomen (Encod), Pascal (artiste), Kiki Picasso, Marie-Paule Pioli, Télé Plaisance, Olivier Poulain, Jean Marc Priez, Franck Pupunat, Radio libertaire, Valère Rogissart, Jean-Luc Roméro, Michel Sitbon, Sriracha Records, Béatrice Stamboul (association de réduction des risques), Techno Plus, Francis Terquem, Jean Vasca, The Wailers, Karl Zéro.
