= Charpentier =

- Pronunciation: shar PAHN' t'yay

Origin
- Meaning: worker or fixer of wood, builder of wood

Other names
- Variant forms: Carpenter, Timmerman, Zimmermann, Zimmerman, Carpentier, Zimerman

Charpentier (pronounced [ʃaʁ.pɑ̃.tje]) is the French word for "carpenter", and it is also a French surname; a variant spelling is Carpentier. In English, the equivalent word and name is "Carpenter"; in German, "Zimmermann"; in Dutch, "Timmerman".

The origin of the name dates to 900–1000, when the Old French "Charpentier" derived from the Late Latin carpentarius artifex ("carpenter" or "wainwright"), equivalent to Latin carpent(um), meaning "two-wheeled carriage" (perhaps ultimately derived from Celtic—consider Old Irish carpad, "chariot"), suffixed with arius ("-ary"); see ER2.

== Persons with the surname ==
=== Visual arts ===
- Alexandre Charpentier (1856–1909), French sculptor
- Constance Marie Charpentier (1767–1849), French painter
- Elisa Beetz-Charpentier (1859–1949), French sculptor
- Jean-Marie Charpentier (1939–2010), French architect
- Marguerite Charpentier (1848–1904), French art collector and salonist

=== Composers & musicians ===
- Marc-Antoine Charpentier (1643–1704), French composer of much sacred vocal music including Te Deum (Charpentier), and Molière's last collaborator
- Jean-Jacques Beauvarlet-Charpentier (28 June 1734 – 6 May 1794) French organist and composer, father of Jacques-Marie (1766–1834), also an organist and composer
- Gustave Charpentier (1860–1956), French composer of Louise (opera)
- Gabriel Charpentier (born 1925), Canadian composer (see Canadian encyclopedia entry)
- Jacques Charpentier (1933–2017), French composer and organist

=== Politicians ===
- Gilles Charpentier (born 1927), French politician
- Léon Charpentier (1859–1945), French politician
- Victor-Therese Charpentier (1732–1776), French governor-general of Saint-Domingue

=== Scientists ===
- Augustin Charpentier (1852–1916), French physician, investigator of size-weight illusion
- Emmanuelle Charpentier (born 1968), French researcher in Microbiology, Genetics and Biochemistry
- François Charpentier (1620–1702), French archaeologist and scholar
- François-Philippe Charpentier (1734–1817), French engraver and inventor
- Johann von or Jean de Charpentier (1786–1855), German-Swiss geologist, namesake of the Antarctic Charpentier Pyramid
- Johann Friedrich Wilhelm de Charpentier (1738–1805), the father of both Toussaint and Johann/Jean
- Marie Charpentier (1903–1994), mathematician
- Myriam Charpentier, molecular biologist
- Toussaint de Charpentier (1779–1847), German geologist and entomologist

=== Soldiers ===
- Henri François Marie Charpentier (1769–1831), French general of the Napoleonic Wars

=== Writers ===
- Fulgence Charpentier (1897–2001), Canadian journalist, editor and publisher

=== Athletes ===
- Sébastien Charpentier (born 1973), French motorcycle racer
- Sébastien Charpentier (born 1977), Canadian ice hockey player
- Gabriel Charpentier (born 1999), Congolese-born French association football player

=== Other ===
- Henri Charpentier (183?-1888), after whom Carpenter, North Dakota was indirectly named
- Georges Charpentier (1846–1905), 19th century French publisher

== See also ==
- Charpentier River in Northern Quebec, Canada
