= Carpenter (disambiguation) =

A carpenter is a person who engages in carpentry, the craft of woodworking.

Carpenter, The Carpenter, Carpenters or The Carpenters may also refer to:

== Insects ==
- Carpenter ant, an ant that nests in wood
- Carpenter bee (Xylocopa), a bee that nests in wood
- Small carpenter bee (Ceratina), a bee that nests in wood

== Music ==
- The Carpenters, a musical group
  - Carpenters (album), 1971 album by the Carpenters
- The Carpenters (violinists), three siblings who play the violin
- The Carpenter (album), an album by The Avett Brothers
- "The Carpenter" (Guy Clark song), a 1983 country music song written and sung by Guy Clark
- "The Carpenter" (Nightwish song), 1997

== Places ==
=== United States ===
- Long Island, Alabama, also known as Carpenter, an unincorporated community
- Carpenter, Colorado, a ghost town
- Carpenter, Delaware, an unincorporated community
- Carpenter Park, Illinois, a park
- Carpenter Township, Jasper County, Indiana
- Carpenter, Iowa, a city
- Carpenter, Kentucky, an unincorporated community
- Carpenter Township, Itasca County, Minnesota
- Carpenter, Mississippi, an unincorporated community
- Carpenter Canyon, Clark County, Nevada
- Carpenter, North Carolina, an unincorporated community
- Carpenter Historic District (Raleigh, North Carolina)
- Carpenter, North Dakota, an unincorporated community
- Carpenter Township, Steele County, North Dakota
- Carpenter, Ohio, an unincorporated community
- Carpenter, Oklahoma, an unincorporated community
- Carpenter, South Dakota, a town
- Carpenter, Texas, an unincorporated community
- Carpenter, Wyoming, an unincorporated community and census-designated place

=== Elsewhere ===
- 1852 Carpenter, an asteroid
- Carpenter (crater), on the Moon
- Carpenter Rocks, a town and locality in southeast South Australia
- Carpenters Estate, a housing estate in London, United Kingdom

== People and fictional characters ==
- Carpenter (surname), including a list of people and fictional characters
- Little Carpenter, nickname of Attakullakulla (c. 1708–1777), influential Cherokee leader
- Habib the Carpenter (c. 5 AD–c. 35 AD), in Muslim tradition a martyr
- William the Carpenter (fl. 1087–1102), French viscount

== Other uses ==
- United Brotherhood of Carpenters and Joiners of America, labor union in North America
- Carpenter Body Company, a bus body manufacturer
- Carpenter Technology Corporation, a metals manufacturer
- Carpenter (theatre), a craftsperson
- The Carpenter (film), a 1988 horror film
- USS Carpenter, a US Navy destroyer
- Carpenter v. United States, a 2018 Supreme Court privacy case

== See also ==
- Carpenters' Company of the City and County of Philadelphia, the oldest extant craft guild in the United States
- Carpenters' Hall, birthplace of the Commonwealth of Pennsylvania and key meeting place in the early history of the United States
- Carpenters Bridge, a historic bridge in Delaware, United States
- List of pubs named Carpenters Arms
- Carpender (disambiguation)
- Carpentier
- Charpentier
