= Carpentier =

- Pronunciation: Kar' pen ti ar

Origin
- Meaning: worker or fixer of wood, builder of wood

Other names
- Variant forms: Carpenter (surname), Charpentier, etc.

Carpentier is a Norman-Picard surname, variant form of French Charpentier and is similar to the English Carpenter, which is borrowed from Norman. In Basse Normandie, the most common form is Lecarpentier.

The words carpentier, charpentier, carpenter are ultimately from Late Latin; carpentarius "artifex" or "wainwright", equivalent to Latin carpent(um) "two wheeled carriage" ( < Celtic (Gaulish) **carbanton; cf. OIr carpad "chariot") + suffix -arius - ARY; see ER2.

Notable people with the surname include:

- Alain Carpentier (born 1933), French heart surgeon
- Alejo Carpentier (1904–1980), Cuban writer and musicologist
- Alexandra Carpentier (born 1987), French mathematical statistician
- Antoine Matthieu Le Carpentier (1709–1773), French architect
- Brett Carpentier (born 1975), Canadian snowboarder
- Charles Francis Carpentier (1896–1964), American politician
- Donald Dee Carpentier (1931–1982), American businessman and politician
- Édouard Carpentier (1926–2010), French wrestler
- Évariste Carpentier (1845–1922), Belgian painter
- Georges Carpentier (1894–1975), French boxer
- Gervais Carpentier, Canadian brigadier general
- Horace Carpentier (1824–1918), American lawyer and first mayor of Oakland, California
- Jean-Baptiste Le Carpentier (1719–1829) French political activist from Normandy
- Jean Carpentier (1933–2018), French historian
- Jules Carpentier (1851–1921) French engineer and inventor
- Marcel Carpentier (1895–1977) French military officer
- Marguerite Jeanne Carpentier (1886–1965) French painter and sculptor
- Maritie and Gilbert Carpentier (Maritie 1922–2002, Gilbert 1920–2000), French TV producer couple
- Patrice Carpentier (born 1950), French sailor
- Patrick Carpentier (born 1971), Canadian race car driver
- Paul Claude-Michel Carpentier (1787–1877), French portrait, genre, history painter and author
- Pieter de Carpentier (c. 1586–1659), Dutch or Flemish administrator of the Dutch East India Company
- Prudent Carpentier (1922–2019), Canadian politician
- William Carpentier (born 1935/36), Canadian-American physician

== Fictional characters ==
- Allen Carpentier, protagonist in Niven & Pournelle's Inferno (novel)
