= Carpender =

- Pronunciation: Kar' pen tar

Origin
- Meaning: worker or fixer of wood, builder of wood

Other names
- Variant forms: Carpenter, Carpentier, Charpentier, etc.

Carpender is a surname. It is an English phonetic variant of the surname Carpenter. It is sometimes seen as Carpendar. Notable people with the surname include:

- Arthur S. Carpender, American Vice Admiral of World War II, served in World War I
- Dave Carpender, guitarist with The Greg Kihn Band
- Edward Weston Carpender (ca. 1796 – 1877), United States Navy officer who served in three wars
- Henry de la Bruyere Carpender and William Carpender Stevens, suspects in the Hall–Mills murder case
- Tom Carpender, former bass player with The Rubinoos
- William Carpender (1844–1927), American banker

== See also ==
- Carpenders Park
- Carpenders Park railway station
