= Jadallys =

- Origin: Paris, France
- Genres: Atmospheric, Alternative, Progressive
- Years active: 2000 – present
- Website: http://www.jadallys.com / Website in reconstruction

Jadallys is a French band formed in 2000, with progressive and experimental influences. It draws inspiration from rock, classical music, French 19th century poets, fantasy film, comic books and literature.

== Biography ==
Jadallys’ founding members – Selene (vocals), Tino (guitars) and Ded (bass) – belonged to Jade, an experimental pop-rock band that performed a lot over its 2-years existence (1998-2000), but didn't release any albums.

In 2000, Jadallys was founded – in reference to “Jade” and to “Alice in Wonderland” – giving the band a darker tone, with inroads into various genres.

Jadallys thus performed at many a rock, metal or gothic concert/festival, the band's dark and mystical esthetics echoing the tastes of these genres’ lovers.

For several years (till 2010), Jadallys featured alongside European and American bands such as Franck The Baptist (USA), Cinema Strange (USA), Zeroscape (Canada), Anathema (UK), Riverside (POL), After Forever (NL), Leaves Eyes (DE), Chaoswave (IT), Magica (RO), The Old Dead Tree (FR), Lycosia (FR), and Nightmare (FR).

In 2004, Le Silence was released: a dark rock opus produced by Brennus records.

In 2007, the second album Labyrinthes was produced by Stéphane Buriez (Loudblast, Black Bomb A, L'Esprit du clan...): physically distributed by Underclass, the album was distributed on the internet by Cheap Noiz Records. Labyrinthes’ cover was conceived by comic books’ author Éric Liberge.

At the end of 2009, during a French tour including Parisian festival The Rock Girls Fest and a concert at the Locomotive (alongside Polish band Riverside), Jadallys started revisiting its former pieces in an acoustic version – a milestone in the musical shift that followed, the band starting to ally acoustic and electronic sounds.

The DVD of this French acoustic tour was released in 2010. Noticeably, at a concert, Jadallys decided to pay a tribute to two notable artists by interpreting two songs not very well known by the public: Jacques Brel's “La Tendresse” and Tommy Bolin's “This Time Around/Owed to G” (Deep Purple, 1975).

An acoustic version of a new piece ends this DVD: “Tomorrow”, sung in English, which also represents a milestone in the band's life – Jadallys having chosen to compose its new opus in English.

From 2012 to 2014, Jadallys has been working on The Elemental Tales, to be released at the end of 2014.

From 2000 to 2014, many interpreters have played in Jadallys. Most stemmed from a classical or jazz background, and a lot of them took an active part in the musical arrangements of the repertoire composed by the band's main author & composer, Selene & Tino. All of them added a personal touch strong enough to easily perceive the different periods of the band's life.

In 2014, Jadallys’ four musicians (Selene, Tino, Ded & Kristina) all conduct artistic, cultural and/or joint venture projects in parallel to the band's life: Selene composes contemporary instrumental music, Tino has ventured into composition of educational guitar pieces, Ded manages a joint venture specialized in historical re-enactment and music and books rock and metal tours, and Kristina promotes a circus/dance company whilst singing/playing the piano in the acoustic project Kristina Vaughan.

== Discography ==
- Jadallys (2001) - self-produced

01. Enfant De Personne
02. La Cité
03. Mélancolie Chronique
04. Tout Pour Le Fric

- Le Silence (2004) - Brennus

01. Songe
02. Break
03. Ce Que Je Vois
04. Douce Hystérie
05. Tenebrae Factae Sunt
06. Le Meneur De Loups
07. Invitation
08. Reflets
09. Jeu De Pistes
10. Tout Ca
11. Le Silence

- Labyrinthes (2007) - Underclass / Cheap Noiz Records

01. Mer Aimante
02. La Complainte de Judas
03. Le Vide
04. Nuit
05. L'Araignée
06. Rapport Sagittarius A
07. K
08. Morte au Combat
09. Labyrinthes
10. Enfant de Personne
11. Expérience
12. Shaman

- Labyrinthes acoustic (CD+DVD) - self-produced

01. Songe
02. Break
03. Reflets
04. Jeu de Piste
05. La complainte de Judas
06. Enfant de Personne
07. Le Vide
08. Tomorrow
09. Morte au combat

- The Elemental Tales - to be released in nov 2014

01. Freedom Ages
02. Dragon's Exodus
03. Rag Doll
04. Mutation
05. Soft Swimmings
06. The Passage
07. Raindrop
08. Cold Tube
09. Tomorrow

== Line up ==
Selene - Vocals
Tino - Guitars
Ded - Bass
Kristina - Keyboards, samples & effects / Backing vocals

- Previous Members

Thibault Faucher (2005-2011) - Drums and Percussion
Sébastien Joly (2000-2005) – Drums
Damien (2005) – Keyboards & samples
Jodrel (2003-2005) – Keyboards
Nath (2001-2003) – Keyboards
Stan (1998-1999) - Percussions
Philippe (1998-2000) - Drums
