= Nedlouc River =

Coordinates: 57°23′30″N 72°45′47″W

Location
- Country: Canada
- Province: Quebec
- Region: Rivière-Koksoak, Nunavik, Nord-du-Québec

Physical characteristics
- Source
  - location: Nedlouc Lake
  - elevation: 326 m (1,070 ft)
- Mouth
  - location: Leaf River (rivière aux Feuilles)
  - elevation: 176 m (577 ft)
- Length: 67.2 km (41.8 mi)
- Basin size: Ungava Bay

The Nedlouc River is a tributary of the Leaf River of northern Quebec, Canada, ultimately flowing into Ungava Bay. Its source is Nedlouc Lake.

== Geography ==
The Nedlouc River flows north-westwards to become a right tributary of the Leaf River which flows eastwards to the west coast of Ungava Bay. The Nedlouc River flows in the unorganized territory Rivière-Koksoak, in the region of Nunavik, in the administrative region of Nord-du-Québec.

The watershed neighbors of Nedlouc river are:

- North side: Leaf River;
- East side: Duvert lake, Kakiattukallak lake, Grammont lake;
- South side: Rivière aux Mélèzes, Dupire lake, Nedlouc Lake;
- West side: Dyonnet lake, Minto Lake.

Its waters come from Nedlouc Lake (area 44 km²). This lake is located about 260 kilometers southwest of Kuujjuaq, Quebec. Having a complex shape, this lake contains two main areas, that are joined together by means of a fast.

The mouth of the lake is located in the northern part of the lake, looking like a tangle of lakes, peninsulas, islands and bays.

From the Nedlouc Lake, the river flows over 5.7 km to the northeast, crosses a lake (elevation: 313 m) over 2,6 km, then flows over 58.9 kilometers to northwest across several fast to its mouth where the current flows on the southern bank of the Leaf River. The mouth of the Nedlouc river is located in front of another river and downstream of Minto lake, as well as 2.3 km downstream from the mouth of rivers Daunais (north shore), downstream of the Irsuaq (south side) and downstream of the Carpenter River (south shore) which are tributaries of the Leaf River.

== Toponymy ==
Originating from the Inuit language, the place name "Nedlouc" signifies "calves" or "the thigh above the knee." The connection between this toponym and the lake remains unclear. In Inuit designation, the lake is alternatively known as "Nallualuk" and "Tasirtuuq," with the latter translating to "great lakes."

In 1951, the "Commission de géographie du Québec" (Quebec Geographic Board) formalized the name "Lake Nedluc". The spelling "Nedluk" has been used in history to designate this lake. The place name Nedlouc River was formalized on December 5, 1968 to the Commission de toponymie du Québec (Quebec Names Board).

== See also ==
- Charpenter River, a stream
- Nedlouc Lake, the source of the Nedlouc River
- Minto lake, a body of water
- Koksoak river, unorganized territory
- Nunavik
