= List of senators of Ardennes =

Location of the Ardennes department in France

Following is a List of senators of Ardennes, people who have represented the department of Ardennes in the Senate of France.

== Third Republic ==
Senators for Ardennes under the French Third Republic were:

- Charles Cunin-Gridaine (1876 –1880)
- Edmond Toupet des Vignes (1876–1882)
- Gustave Gailly (1880 –1903)
- Louis Eugène Péronne (1882–1892)
- Louis Tirman (1892 –1899)
- Théophile Armand Neveux (1888–1893)
- Étienne Drumel (1893 –1897)
- Désiré Linard (1898–1898)
- Charles Goutant (1898–1906)
- Eugène Fagot (1900 –1919)
- Albert Gérard (1903–1930)
- Gustave Gobron (1907–1911)
- Lucien Hubert (1912–1938)
- Léon Charpentier (1920–1930)
- Albert Meunier (1930–1939)
- Henri Philippoteaux (1930 –1935)
- Firmin Leguet (1936–1945)
- Ernest Labbé (1939–1942)
- Edmond Hannotin (1939–1945)

== Fourth Republic ==
Senators for Ardennes under the French Fourth Republic were:

- Marie-Hélène Cardot (8 December 1946 – 26 April 1959) (Groupe du Mouvement Républicain Populaire)
- Eugène Cuif (19 June 1955 – 26 April 1959), (Groupe des Républicains Indépendants)
- Jacques Bozzi (7 November 1948 – 19 June 1955), (Groupe Socialiste)
- André Victoor (8 December 1946 – 7 November 1948), (Groupe Communiste)

== Fifth Republic ==
Senators for Ardennes under the French Fifth Republic:

In office	Name	Group
1959–1984	René Tinant	Groupe de l'Union Centriste des Démocrates de Progrès
1959–1971	Marie-Hélène Cardot	Groupe de l'Union Centriste
1971–2007	Maurice Blin	Groupe de l'Union Centriste
1984–1989	Christian Masson	Groupe du Rassemblement pour la République
1989–1996	Jacques Sourdille	Groupe du Rassemblement pour la République
1996–2004	Hilaire Flandre	Union pour un mouvement populaire (UMP)
2004–present	Benoît Huré	Les Républicains
2007–present	Marc Laménie	Les Républicains

== Sources ==
- Liste des anciens sénateurs de la IIIème République par circonscription (in French), Sénat de France
- Liste des anciens sénateurs de la IVème République par circonscription (in French), Sénat de France
- Liste des anciens sénateurs de la Vème République par circonscription (in French), Sénat de France
- Liste par département – Ardennes (in French), Sénat de France
