= Carpentieri =

Carpentieri is a surname, a variant form of French Charpentier. Notable people with the surname include:

- Domenico Carpentieri, Italian racewalker
- Luigi Carpentieri (1920-1987) was an Italian film producer and assistant director
- Renato Carpentieri (born 1943), Italian actor, stage director and playwright
