= Carpender (disambiguation) =

Carpender or Carpendar may refer to:

Surnames:

- Carpender, English phonetic variant of the surname Carpenter

Places:

- Carpenders Park, a suburb of Watford in Hertfordshire, England
- Carpenders Park railway station, a railway station on the Watford DC Line in Hertfordshire, England

== See also ==
- Carpenter (disambiguation)
