= Jean-Pierre Galland =

French writer and cannabis activist

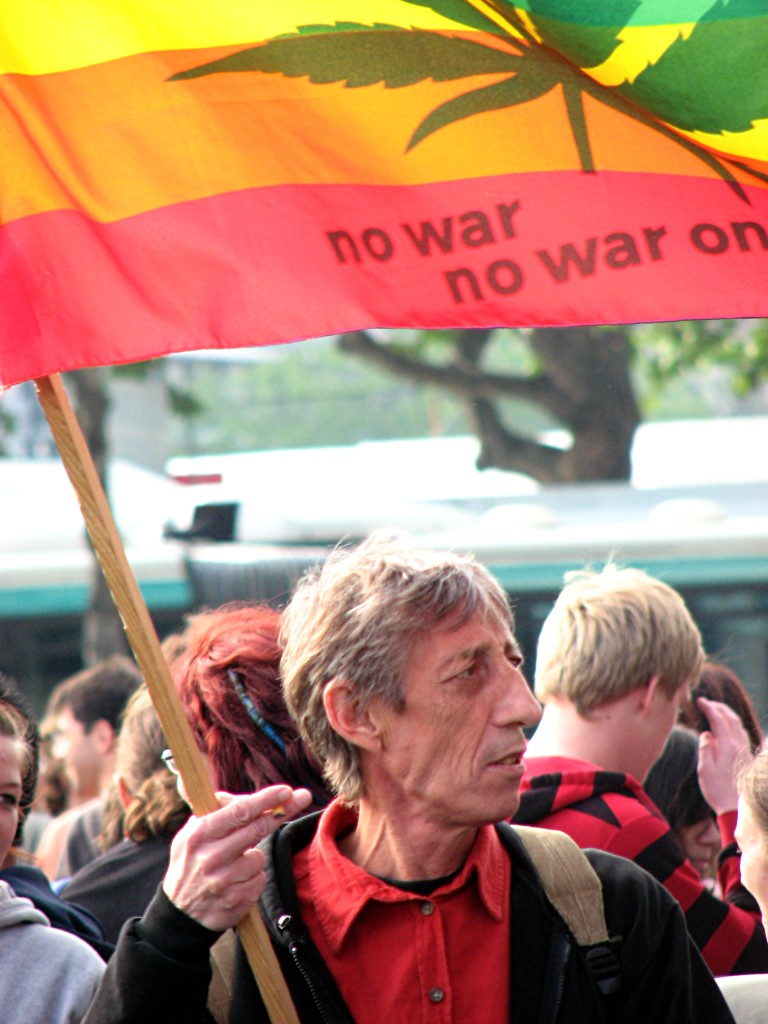
- Born: 2 March 1951 (age 74); Lyon, France
- Occupation(s): Writer, activist

Jean-Pierre Galland (born 2 March 1951) is a French writer and activist. In 1991 his bestseller Fumée Clandestine, an illustrated and documented work devoted to cannabis in all its aspects, will propel him as the first representative of the fight for cannabis legalization in France.

== Biography ==
Born in Lyon, Jean-Pierre Galland smoked his first joint around the age of 17. Having become a writer, he published a few thrillers in the early 1980s, then in 1988, he offered Ramsay a book project on cannabis. This book, released in 1991 under the title Fumée Clandestine, received tremendous media coverage after the author appeared on the Canal+ television program « Nulle part ailleurs ». In the wake of the success of his book, Galland participated with friends in the founding of the Collectif d'Information et de Recherche Cannabique (CIRC) on 20 November 1991, an association of which he remained president for twenty years.

In 1994 he relaunched « l'appel du 18 Joint », originally published in the newspaper Libération in 1976.

Jean-Pierre Galland has been the subject of several legal proceedings, despite the support of many personalities and associations. In particular, he was accused of publishing, through the IARC, documents in favor of drug liberalization and leaflets informing about consumption that limits the risks of cannabis, thus presenting it in a favorable light, which falls under the law.

As an activist he is therefore in line with other associations and NGOs on the perspective of reducing the damage associated with the consumption of psychotropic substances. Jean-Pierre Galland also participated, alongside Michel Sitbon, in the creation of Éditions du Lézard and Éditions Trouble-Fête. In 2013, he published the first volume of Cannabis 40 ans de malentendus, relating the general history of the movements in favor of the decriminalization of the use, possession and cultivation of cannabis.

In 1999 he was a candidate for the Greens in the European elections.

== Bibliography ==
- "Cannabis 40 ans de malentendus – Volume 2, 1997–2002", 2014, Éditions Trouble Fête 2014. ISBN 978-2-914253-14-7 BnF 43862005x 184 pages.
- "Cannabis 40 ans de malentendus – Volume 1, 1970–1996", 2013, Éditions Trouble Fête 2013. ISBN 978-2-914253-13-0 BnF 43653169x 168 pages.
- "J'attends une récolte — de J.-P. Galland et Phix", 2000, Éditions Trouble Fête 2000. ISBN 2914253095 144 pages, 21 × 24 cm,(en) "Homegrown Harvest" 2005.
- "Cannabis : Nouvelles du front", 1998, Éditions du Lézard 1998. (ISBN 2-910718-09-3) (BNF 36692907) 158 pages.
- "Fumée Clandestine, Tome II – Le monde est en pétard", 1998, Éditions du Lézard 1998. (ISBN 2-910718-01-8) 336 pages.
- "Fumée Clandestine, Tome I – Il était une fois le Cannabis", 1991, Éditions Ramsay 22 mars 1991. ISBN 2859569154, Éditions du Lézard 1991. ISBN 2950726402 287 pages, Éditions du Lézard 2012. ISBN 291071845X 290 pages.
- "Comme un vélo rouge, 1989, Régine Deforges Éditions, 1989 ISBN 2905538368,Éditions Trouble Fête 2013. ISBN 2914253044.
- "A l'eau de rose !", Albin Michel, collection sanguine n° 12, 1985 ISBN 2226015868.
- "Malheur au vaincu!", Albin Michel, collection sanguine n° 3, 1982 ISBN 2226014691
- "Meurtres modernes.", Albin Michel, collection sanguine n° 1, 1980 (ISBN 2-86559-001-1)
