= Lake Minto =

Lake in Nunavik, Quebec, Canada

- Location within Quebec

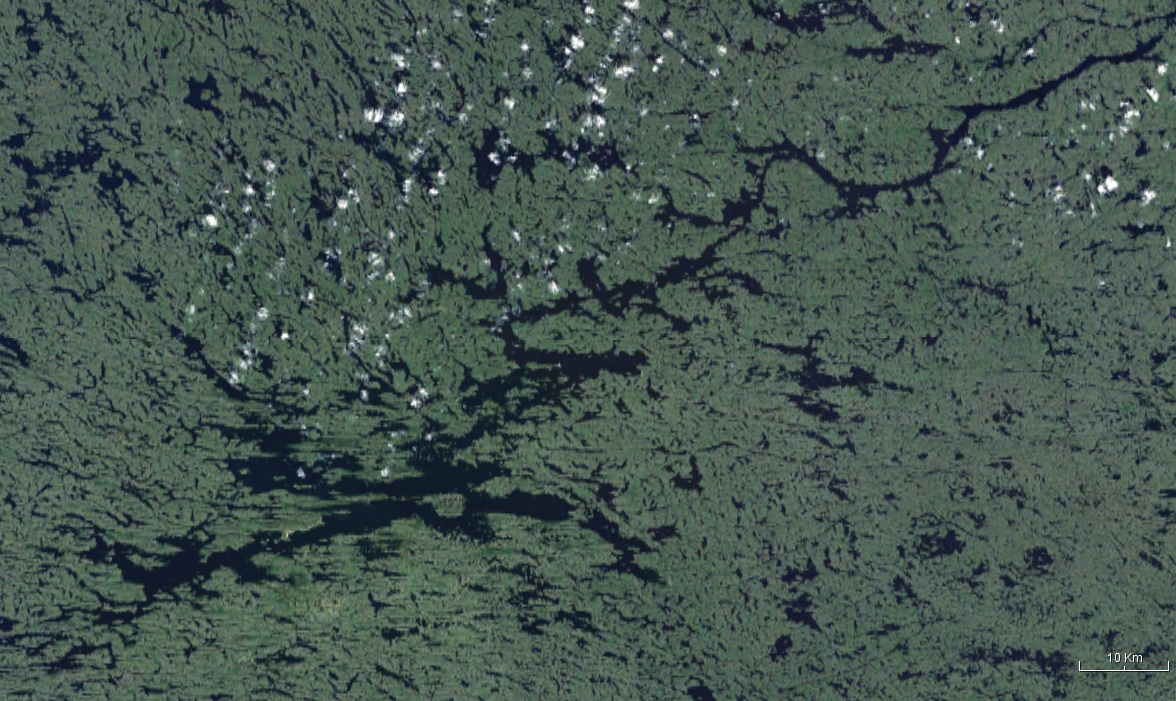
- Location: Baie-d'Hudson, Kativik, Quebec
- Coordinates: 57°13′07″N 75°00′45″W
- Type: Oligotrophic
- Primary inflows: Charpentier River and other rivers
- Primary outflows: Leaf River
- Basin countries: Canada
- Max. length: 81 km (50 mi)
- Max. width: 22 km (14 mi)
- Surface area: 761 km^{2} (294 sq mi)
- Surface elevation: 168 m (551 ft)

Lake Minto (Inuktitut: Qasigialik, "where there are spotted seals") is a lake on western Ungava Peninsula, Nunavik, Quebec, Canada. It has a total surface area of 761 square kilometres (294 sq mi) and a net area of 703 square kilometres (271 sq mi).

It was named by Canadian explorer and geologist Albert Peter Low in 1898 after Gilbert Elliot-Murray-Kynynmound, 4th Earl of Minto, who was Governor General of Canada at that time.

It is only some 60 kilometres (37 mi) east of Hudson Bay in a valley between several rows of hills, but Lake Minto's outlet, the Leaf River, flows north-east for about 265 kilometres (165 mi) to Ungava Bay. As such, it is used by canoeists especially when crossing Ungava from west to east.

It is considered one of the most beautiful lakes in northern Quebec.
