= Leaf River (Quebec) =

Leaf River Rivière aux Feuilles
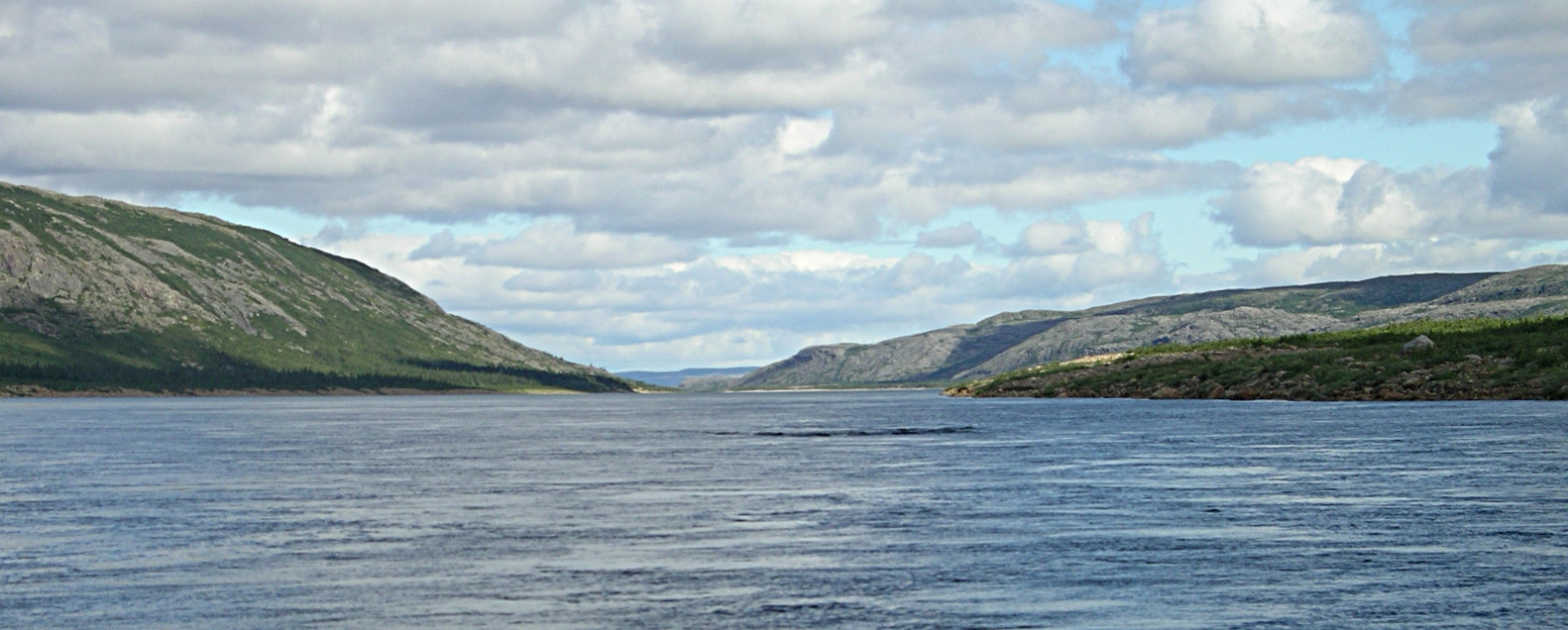

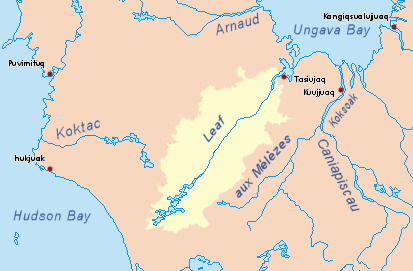

Location
- Country: Canada
- Province: Quebec
- Region: Nord-du-Québec

Physical characteristics
- Source: Lake Minto
  - location: Nunavik
  - coordinates: 57°13′07″N 75°00′45″W
  - elevation: 181 m (594 ft)
- Mouth: Leaf Bay (off Ungava Bay)
  - location: Tasiujaq
  - coordinates: 58°46′37″N 70°04′00″W
  - elevation: 0 m (0 ft)
- Length: 480 km (300 mi)(includes Lake Minto)
- Basin size: 42,500 km^{2} (16,400 sq mi)
- Discharge
  - average: 590 m^{3}/s (21,000 cu ft/s)

Leaf River (French: Rivière aux Feuilles; Inuktitut: Kuugaaluk ["the large river"] or Itinniq ["where there are spring tides"]) is a river in northern Quebec, Canada, at the northern limit of the tree line. It flows from Lake Minto northeast through the Ungava Peninsula into Leaf Bay off Ungava Bay over a distance of 480 kilometres (300 mi). At the head of Leaf Bay is the Inuit community of Tasiujaq.

With caution, it is possible to paddle the entire Leaf River without portaging, as it contains no impassable waterfalls or non-navigable rapids. The river's length, measured from Charpentier Bay to Tasiujaq, is 320 kilometres (200 mi); if measured from first discernable current, it is 288 kilometres (179 mi).

The river is ice-free for about 60 days each year.

== Tributaries ==
The significant tributaries of the Leaf River are:

- Charpentier River
- Nedlouc River
- Descareaux River
- Daunais River
- Goudalie River
- Vizien River
- Brissard River
- Qijuttuuk River
- Cohade River
- Tuktu River
- Dufreboy Creek
- Viennaux River
- Papijjusaq River
- Peladeau River
- Fanfan River

== History ==
Since at least the late 19th century, the river has been known by its English name, "Leaf River", which was probably derived from the Arctic willow and birch trees that grow sparsely along its banks. The Hudson's Bay Company fished there for salmon and porpoises, and opened a trading post at the mouth of the river around 1905. In the early 20th century, the French name Rivière des Feuilles was assigned, and standardized to its current form Rivière aux Feuilles in 1925.

First known explorers:
1898 - Albert Peter Low
1912 - Robert J. Flaherty
1976 - Bob Davis

== The Leaf River caribou herd ==
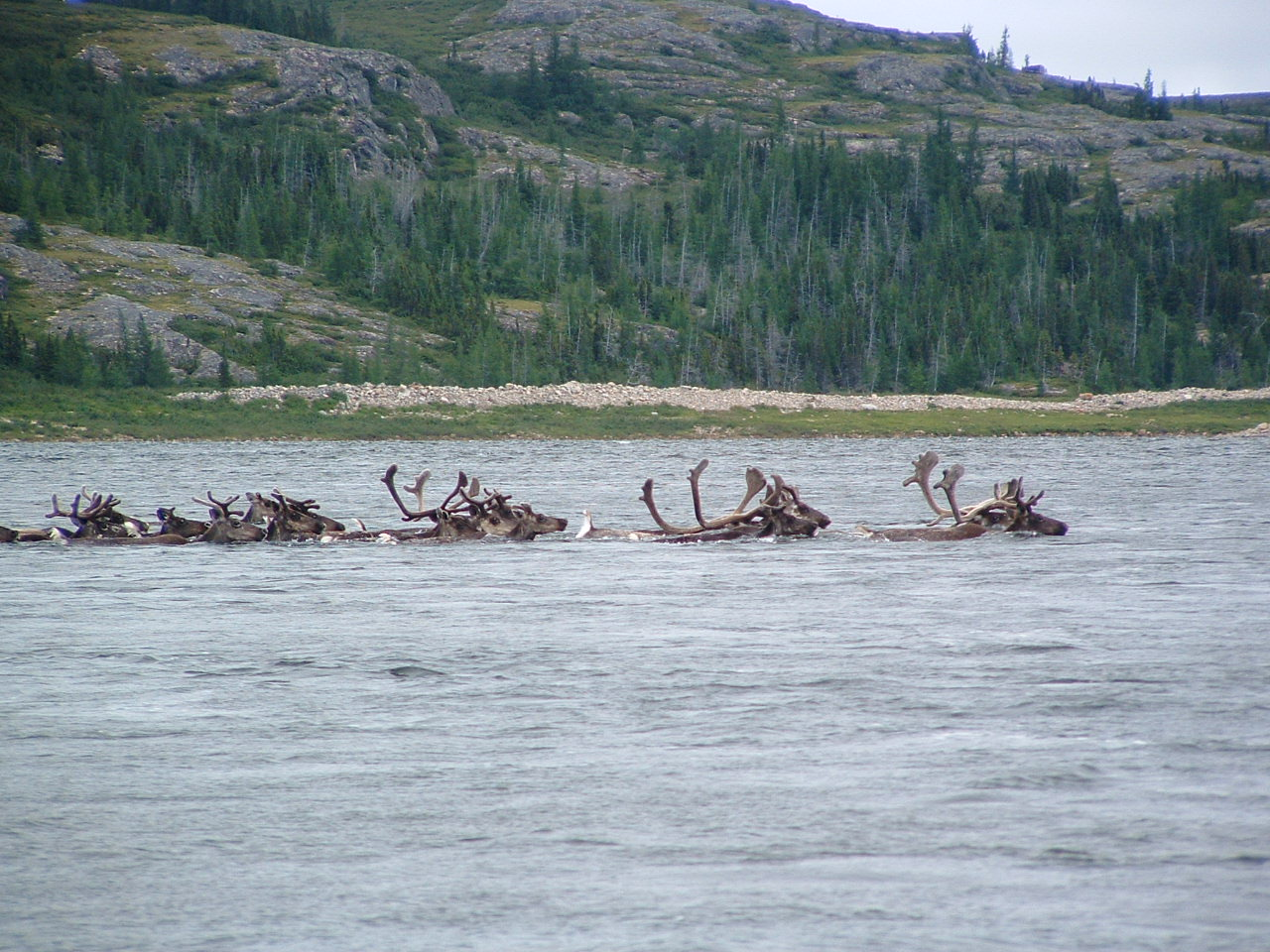
Caribou crossing Leaf River

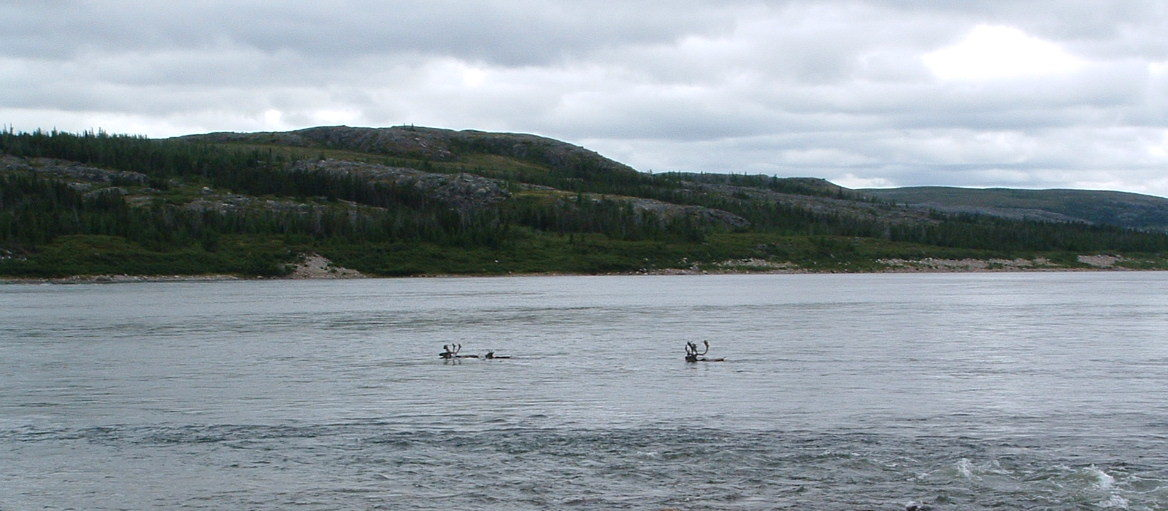
Leaf River and caribou

The Leaf River caribou herd (LRCH) is a migratory forest-tundra ecotype of the boreal population, a caribou subspecies of Rangifer tarandus caribou. Like the George River Herd, it migrates between forest and tundra. Migratory caribou herds are often defined in terms of female natal philopatry or natal homing, the tendency to return to natal calving areas—in this case, the Leaf River. The Leaf Herd in the west, near the coast of Hudson Bay, increased from 270,000 in 1991 to 628,000 in 2001. According to the Quebec's Natural Resources and Wildlife survey, the Leaf River Herd (LRH) (Rivière-aux-Feuilles) had decreased to 430,000 caribou in 2011. According to an international study on caribou populations, the Leaf River herd could be threatened with extinction by 2080.
