= Jean-Luc Warsmann =

French politician (born 1965)

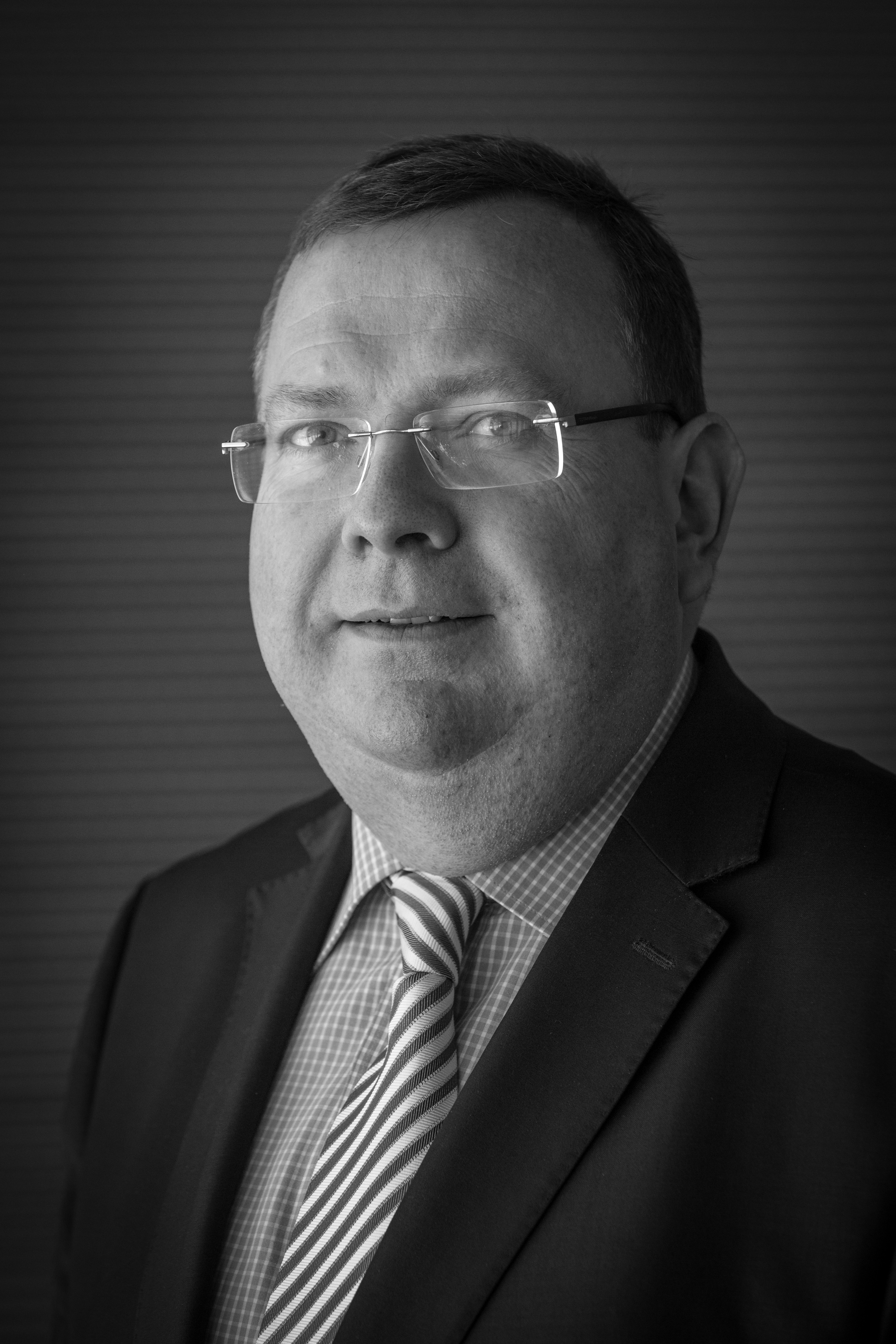

Member of the National Assembly for Ardennes's 3rd constituency
- Incumbent
- Assumed office 12 December 1995
- Preceded by: Claude Vissac

Mayor of Douzy
- In office 18 June 1995 – 30 March 2014
- Preceded by: Michel Godet
- Succeeded by: Charline Closse

Personal details
- Born: 22 October 1965 (age 60) Villers-Semeuse, France
- Party: Rally for the Republic (until 2002); Union for a Popular Movement (2002–2015); The Republicans (2015–2018); Union of Democrats and Independents (2018–present)
- Education: Sciences Po

Jean-Luc Warsmann (French pronunciation: [ʒɑ̃lyk waʁsman]; born 22 October 1965) is a French politician who has represented the 3rd constituency of the Ardennes department in the National Assembly since 1995. A member of the Union of Democrats and Independents (UDI), he also served as Mayor of Douzy from 1995 to 2014.

== Political career ==
In parliament, Warsmann has been serving on the Committee on Legal Affairs since 1995.

From 2005 until 2007, Warsmann served as vice-president of the National Assembly, under the leadership of president Jean-Louis Debré.

Following the 2007 French legislative election, Warsmann succeeded Philippe Houillon as chairman of the Committee on Legal Affairs. In this capacity, he was the parliament's rapporteur on the French constitutional law of 23 July 2008. In 2009, Warsmann introduced a bill according to which the Church of Scientology cannot be dissolved in France even if it is convicted of fraud; the change in the relevant law made the maximum penalty for fraud committed by an organisation a ban on its activities in France. Also in 2009, the committee adopted a proposal made by Warsmann which provides for financial sanctions against any deputy who is absent from committee sessions more than once a month without justification. By 2012, Warsmann was replaced by Jean-Jacques Urvoas.

From 2007 until 2017, Warsmann was as one of twelve parliamentarians who served as judge on the Cour de Justice de la République.

In addition to his committee assignments, Warsmann is part of the French-German Parliamentary Friendship Group and the French-Luxembourg Parliamentary Friendship Group.

Since 2020, Warsmann has been part of the UDI and Independents group.
