= Koksoak River =

River in Quebec, Canada

Koksoak River Rivière Koksoak
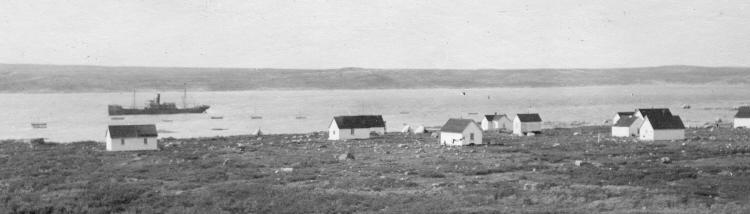

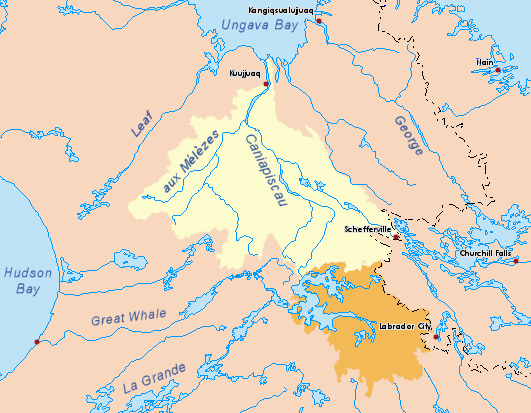
- Drainage basin of the Koksoak River in yellow. Diverted basin of the Caniapiscau River in orange.

Location
- Country: Canada
- Province: Quebec
- Region: Nord-du-Québec

Physical characteristics
- Source confluence: Kanniq Confluence (Caniapiscau and Larch Rivers)
  - location: About 80 km SW from Kuujjuaq
  - coordinates: 57°40′18″N 69°29′12″W
  - elevation: 20 m (66 ft)
- Mouth: Ungava Bay
  - location: About 50 km NNE from Kuujjuaq
  - coordinates: 58°32′11″N 68°09′29″W
  - elevation: 0 m (0 ft)
- Length: 137 km (85 mi)
- Basin size: 133,400 km^{2} (51,500 sq mi)
- Discharge
  - average: 2,800 m^{3}/s (99,000 cu ft/s)

The Koksoak River (French: rivière Koksoak) is a river in northern Quebec, Canada, the largest river in the Nunavik region. The Inuit village and region's administrative centre Kuujjuaq lies on the shores of the Koksoak, about 50 kilometres (31 mi) south from its mouth.

The name Koksoak is believed to originate from Moravian missionaries who evangelized among the Inuit of the area at the beginning of British rule and incorrectly spelled the Inuktitut word Kuujjuaq, meaning "great river." In the 19th century, the river was also known as Big or South River, taken from South Bay which was the name of Ungava Bay at that time. In 1916, the name Koksoak was officially adopted.

The Koksoak River arises at the confluence of its two main tributaries, the Rivière aux Mélèzes to the west and the Caniapiscau River to the south. The Koksoak River flows for about 80 kilometres (50 mi) in an east-northeasterly direction into Ungava Bay, and passes by the village of Kuujjuaq, from where it flows northwards for about 50 kilometres (31 mi) to the coast. The total length of the Koksoak River and its main tributary, the Caniapiscau River, is approximately 874 kilometres (543 mi) and the size of the drainage basin is about 133,000 square kilometres (51,000 sq mi). However, in 1985 the upper waters of the Canaipiscau River were diverted as part of the James Bay Project and about 45% of the waterflow of the Caniapiscau now flows through the Caniapiscau Reservoir and on into the LaForge and La Grande Rivers to the west. The catchment area of the Caniapiscau Reservoir is about 36,800 square kilometres (14,200 sq mi).

The Koksoak river has an estimated mean discharge of approximately 55 km^{3} of water per year - though the absence of long streamgauging records means accurate data are not available. Most of the flow occurs during the early summer when the ice on the river thaws and snow in the Canadian Shield melts. The Koksoak River lies on the boundary between the northern limit of the boreal forest and the vast tundra expanses of the Ungava Peninsula to the north. All the Koksoak basin is covered with permafrost - discontinuous in the south and continuous in the north.

Although hunting activities and administrative services are a mainstay of life in Kuujjuaq, adventure tourism is expanding, centred mostly on caribou hunting as well as salmon, trout and Arctic char fishing.

== Tributaries ==
The significant tributaries of the Koksoak are (in upstream order):

- Highfall Creek
- Kupatalik River
- Ujaralialuk River
- Caniapiscau River
  - Forbes River
  - Situraviup River
  - Andréas River
  - Sérigny River
  - Swampy bay River
- Rivière aux Mélèzes
  - Aigneau River
  - Lefebvre River
  - Ikirtuuq River
  - Rivière du Gué
    - Guignas River
    - Delay River
  - Potier River

== See also ==
- List of longest rivers of Canada
