= Léon Charpentier =

French politician

Léon Hubert Charpentier (French pronunciation: [leɔ̃ ybɛʁ ʃaʁpɑ̃tje]; 22 August 1859 – 12 May 1945) was a French politician who represented Ardennes in the French Senate from 1920 to 1930.

== Family ==
His grandson Gilles Charpentier was Socialist Member of Parliament for Ardennes's 3rd constituency from 1981 to 1986.

== See also ==
- List of senators of Ardennes
