= Appeal of 18 June =

1940 speech by Charles de Gaulle

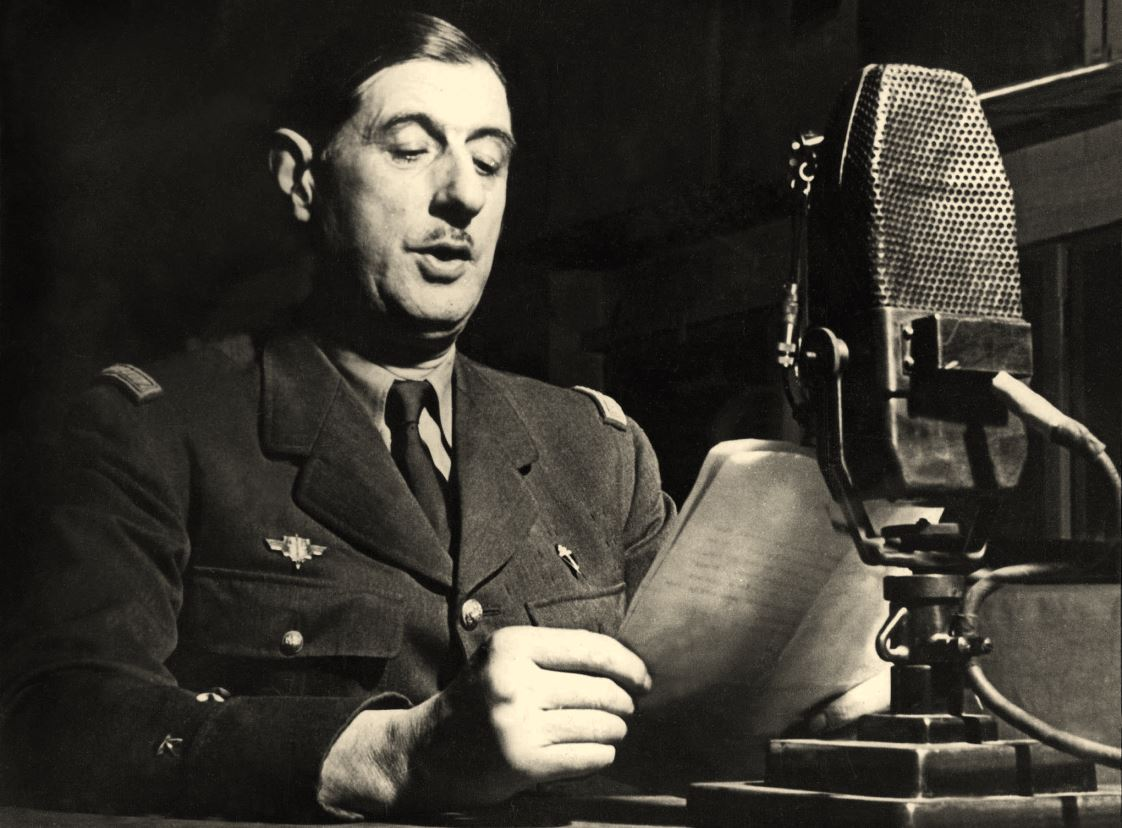
Charles de Gaulle at the microphone of the BBC in London. This photograph postdates 18 June 1940, since the General is wearing on his jacket the Cross of Lorraine insignia, adopted as the emblem of Free France in July of that same year. Since no photograph exists of the actual 18 June appeal, this famous image is often used to illustrate the famous radio broadcast speech.

The Appeal of 18 June (French: L'Appel du 18 juin) was the first speech made by Charles de Gaulle after his arrival in London in 1940 following the Battle of France. Broadcast to France by the radio services of the British Broadcasting Corporation (BBC), it is often considered to have marked the beginning of the French Resistance in World War II. It is regarded as one of the most important speeches in French history. In spite of its significance in French collective memory, historians have shown that the appeal was heard only by a very small minority of French people. De Gaulle's 22 June 1940 speech was more widely heard. The historic importance of these radio broadcasts and de Gaulle's future status as the emblem of the French resistance gave de Gaulle the nickname L'Homme du 18 juin (The Man of 18 June).

== Context ==
The Appeal of 18 June 1940 was an important moment in the history of Charles de Gaulle in the Second World War. De Gaulle had recently been promoted to the rank of brigadier general and named as under-secretary of state for national defence and war by Prime Minister Paul Reynaud during the German invasion of France. Reynaud resigned after his proposal for a Franco-British Union was rejected by his cabinet and Marshal Philippe Pétain, a hero of World War I, became the new prime minister, pledging to sign an armistice with Nazi Germany. De Gaulle opposed any such action and, facing imminent arrest, fled France on 17 June. Other leading politicians, including Georges Mandel, Léon Blum, Pierre Mendès France, Jean Zay and Édouard Daladier (and separately Reynaud), were arrested while travelling to continue the war from North Africa.

De Gaulle arrived in London on the afternoon of 17 June and met with Winston Churchill. The British prime minister had a good opinion of de Gaulle from their three previous meetings, and gave permission to make a speech to France. De Gaulle finished his speech on the morning of 18 June at The French House, Soho but did not know that the British government almost revoked permission. London hoped to persuade the Pétain government in Bordeaux to send the French Navy away from German use, and individual French politicians to leave France, so worried about a speech criticizing the French government. Having sent three separate simultaneous delegations to Bordeaux, it decided that the speech would not confuse things further.

Ignorant of the British debate over his speech, de Gaulle arrived at the BBC at 6 pm BST to record the four-minute speech. After final permission arrived at 8 pm, the speech was broadcast at 10 pm BST (8 pm in Paris) on BBC Radio from Broadcasting House over France. BBC repeated the broadcast four more times the next day.

De Gaulle's speech stated that superior German arms and tactics had defeated the French military. The defeat was not complete because France still had its colonies, the British Empire as its ally, and help from the United States; this was a world war in which the Battle of France was one part. De Gaulle invited French soldiers and civilians to contact him.

== Translation of the speech ==
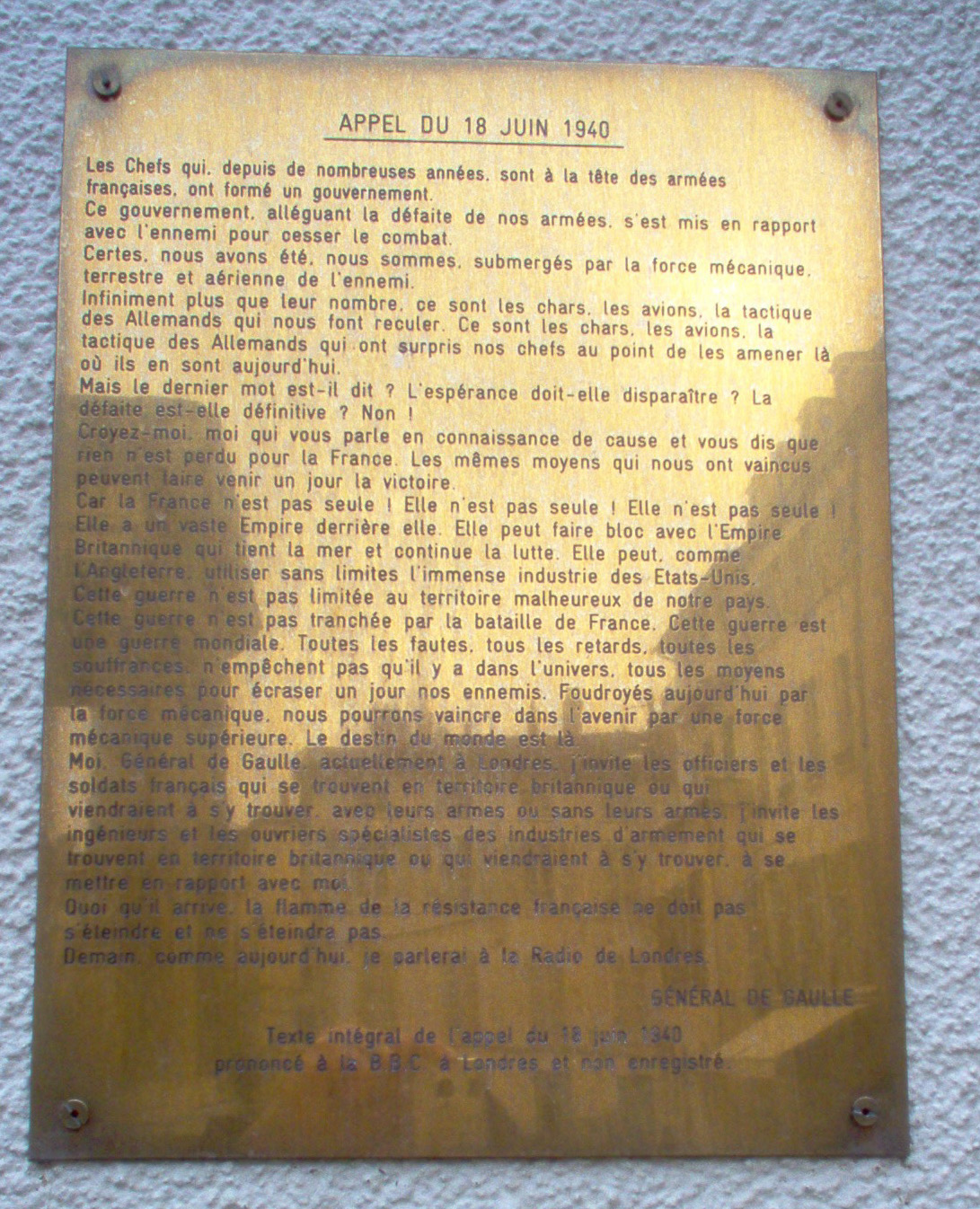
Memorial plate with Appeal of 18 June, Vienne, Isère

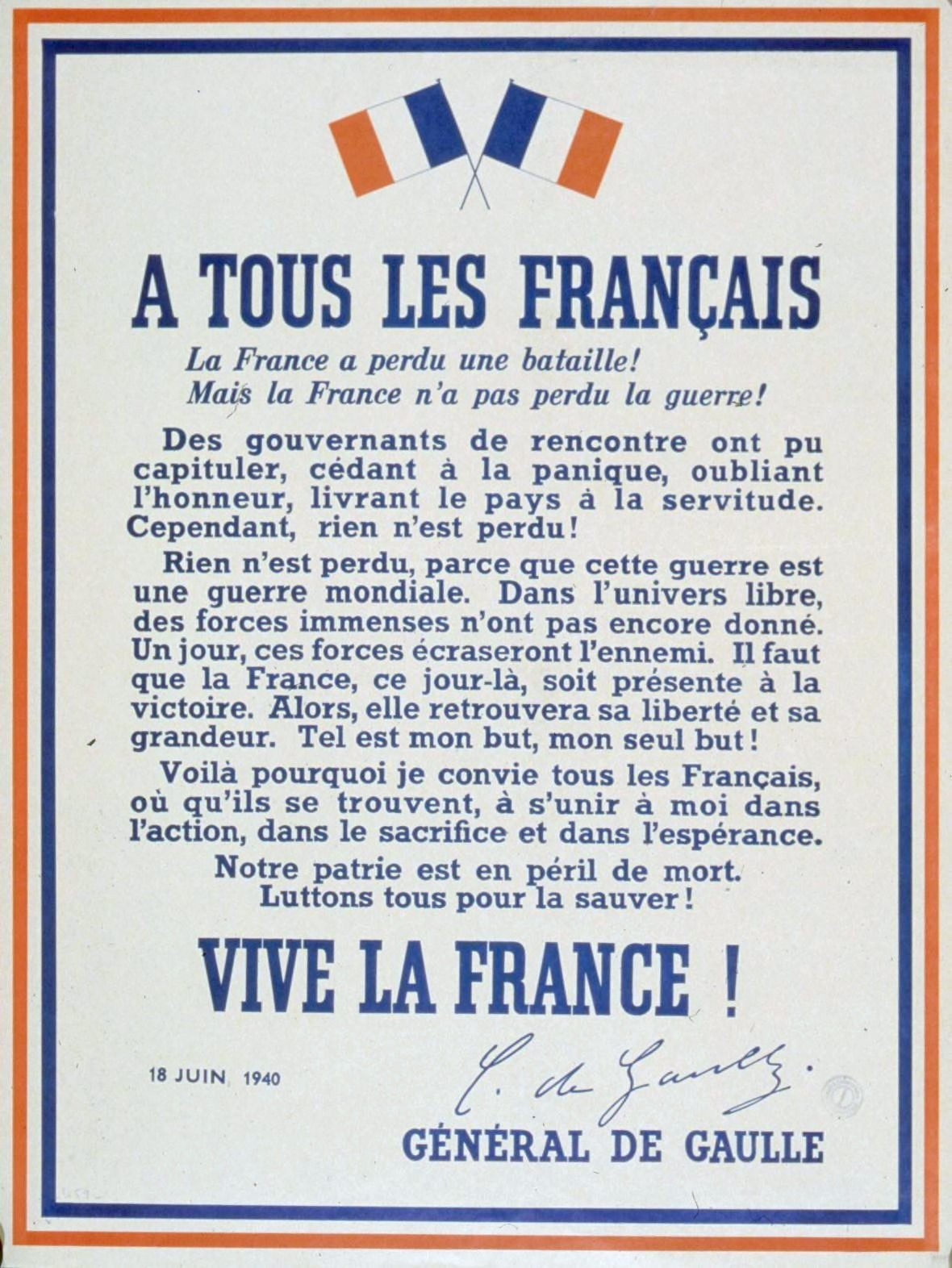
The so-called London Poster of 5 August

The leaders who, for many years, were at the head of French armies, have formed a government. This government, alleging our armies to be undone, agreed with the enemy to stop fighting. Of course, we were subdued by the mechanical, ground and air forces of the enemy. Infinitely more than their number, it was the tanks, the aeroplanes, the tactics of the Germans which made us retreat. It was the tanks, the aeroplanes, the tactics of the Germans that surprised our leaders to the point to bring them there where they are today.

But has the last word been said? Must hope disappear? Is defeat final? No!

Believe me, I speak to you with full knowledge of the facts and tell you that nothing is lost for France. The same means that overcame us can bring us to a day of victory. For France is not alone! She is not alone! She is not alone! She has a vast Empire behind her. She can align with the British Empire that holds the sea and continues the fight. She can, like England, use without limit the immense industry of the United States.

This war is not limited to the unfortunate territory of our country. This war is not finished by the battle of France. This war is a world wide war. All the faults, all the delays, all the suffering, do not prevent there to be, in the world, all the necessary means to one day crush our enemies. Vanquished today by mechanical force, we will be able to overcome in the future by a superior mechanical force.

The destiny of the world is here. I, General de Gaulle, currently in London, invite the officers and the French soldiers who are located in British territory or who would come there, with their weapons or without their weapons, I invite the engineers and the special workers of armament industries who are located in British territory or who would come there, to put themselves in contact with me.

Whatever happens, the flame of the French resistance must not be extinguished and will not be extinguished.

== Reception and influence ==
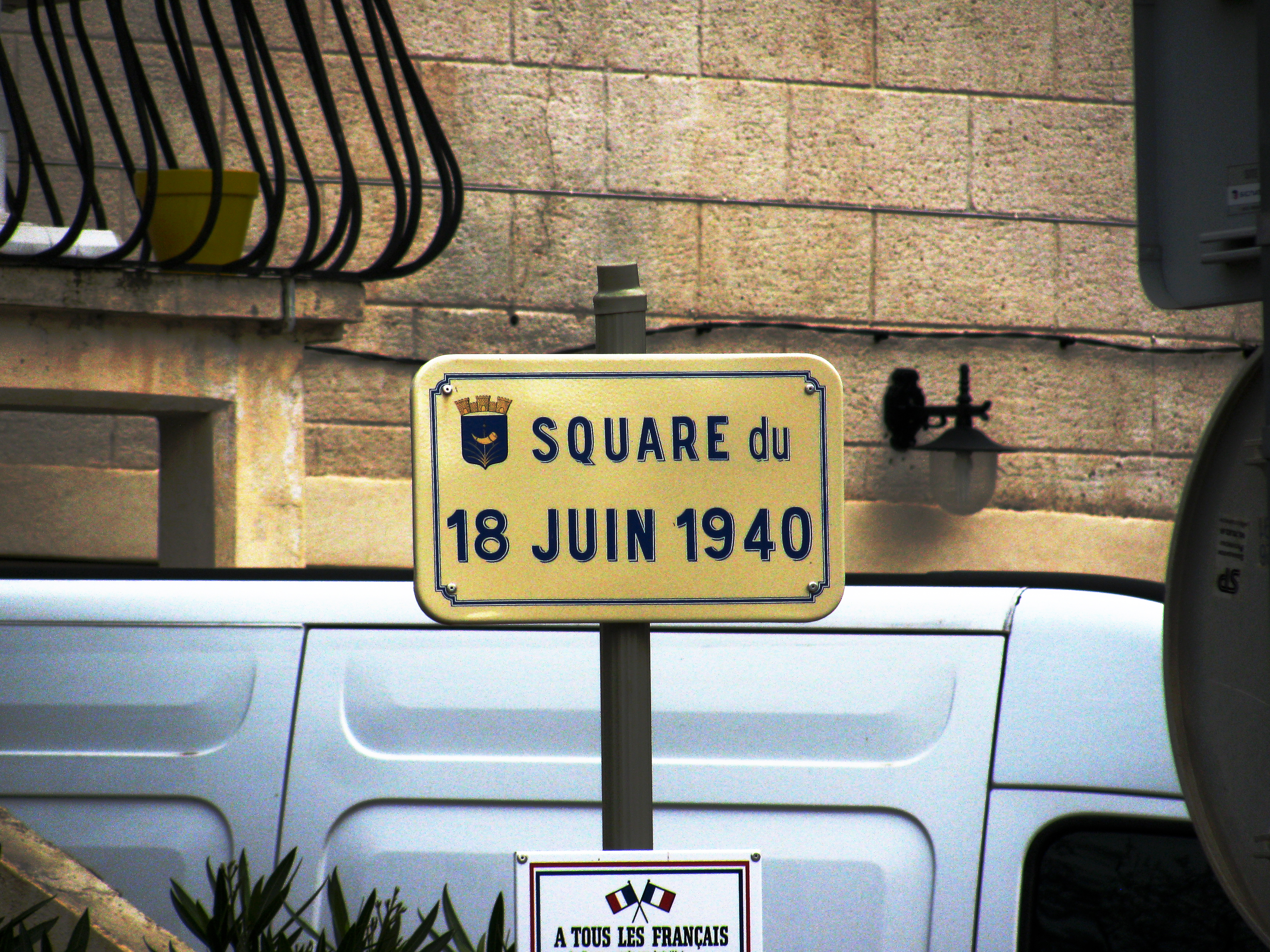
The speech of 18 June occupies a prominent place in the popular history of France, as in this street named after it in the town of Jonquières.

After the war, de Gaulle's 18 June broadcast was often identified as the beginning of the French Resistance, and the beginning of the process of liberating France from German occupation. The speech began de Gaulle's entire future career, what he later described as his "legitimacy". He was the first French public figure to oppose an armistice with Germany, and the speech gave reasons why continuing to fight the war was not hopeless.

Although the 18 June speech is among the most famous in French history, few French listeners heard it; most accounts of having heard it are false memories. It was broadcast on the BBC, a British radio station, which did not retain the unimportant recording. (Note: De Gaulle's son wrote: "I remember very well his fury when he came home rather late that night [the 19th of June] after the broadcast. He had learned from the BBC that his radio broadcast the day before had not been recorded.") The 18 June broadcast, practically unannounced, was by an obscure brigadier general who had only recently been appointed as a junior minister, and very few French people at the time listened to the BBC. Consequently, of the 10,000 French citizens in Britain, only 300 volunteered. Of the more than 100,000 soldiers temporarily on British soil, most of them recently evacuated from Norway or Dunkirk, only 7,000 stayed on to join de Gaulle. The rest returned to France and were quickly made prisoners of war. However, de Gaulle's speech was undeniably influential and provided motivation for the people of France and for the oppressed people of the rest of Europe.

The themes of the speech would be reused throughout the war to inspire the French people to resist German occupation. Four days later, de Gaulle delivered a speech that largely reiterated the points made in his 18 June speech, and the second speech was heard by a larger audience in France. The content of the 22 June speech is often confused for that of 18 June. De Gaulle and the Free French cause may have benefited from the confusion, as the later speech has better writing. In addition, in early August a poster written by de Gaulle would be distributed widely in London and would become known as L'affiche de Londres (The London Poster); it is also often mistaken for the 18 June speech. Variations of this poster would be produced and displayed in Africa, South America and France itself over the course of the war.

The French and Swiss governments recorded the 18 June speech as broadcast in written form. The Swiss published the text for their own uses on 19 June. The manuscript of the speech, as well as the recording of the 22 June speech, were nominated on 18 June 2005 for inclusion in UNESCO's Memory of the World Register by the BBC, which called it "one of the most remarkable pieces in the history of radio broadcasting".

The 70th anniversary of the speech was marked in 2010 by the issuing of a postage stamp (designed by Georges Mathieu) and a €2 commemorative coin.

In 2023, Le Monde commissioned a recreation of the speech using artificial intelligence to replicate de Gaulle's voice, using a German-language transcription of the speech in Swiss military archives to find the French record of the speech closest to the original and recording a reading of the speech by François Morel as "base audio" to be modified by vocal synthesis to be closer to de Gaulle's voice.

In June 2025 the de Gaulle family donated a newly discovered draft of the 18 June speech to the French National Archives.

When Christiane Desroches Noblecourt, the head of the Centre d'Étude et de Documentation sur l'Ancienne Égypte (CEDAE) said that France would save the Temple of Amada from the rising waters of the Aswan High Dam, de Gaulle, who had become President of France, had no idea of the commitment she had made in the name of her country. Reportedly on learning of it, he demanded, "Madame, how dare you say that France will save the temple, without authorization from my government?" Noblecourt replied, "General, how dare you make an appeal on the radio without authorization from Pétain?", referencing the Appeal of 18 June. Amused, De Gaulle agreed to honour Noblecourt's promise.

In 1976, advocates for legalization of cannabis in France published Appel du 18 joint. Since then, many pro-advocacy events have been held on that date.

== "France has lost a battle, but has not lost the war" ==
De Gaulle's famous quote: "La France a perdu une bataille! Mais la France n'a pas perdu la guerre" ("France has lost a battle, but France has not lost the war") is often associated with the Appeal of 18 June. While the Appeal's themes are consistent with the quote, it is from a motivational poster featuring de Gaulle, A Tous Les Français, which was distributed all over London on 3 August 1940.

== See also ==
- Liberation of France
- Wallonie libre – Belgian resistance group purportedly formed after the 18 June 1940 broadcast
