= Lake Nedlouc =

Lake in Quebec, Canada

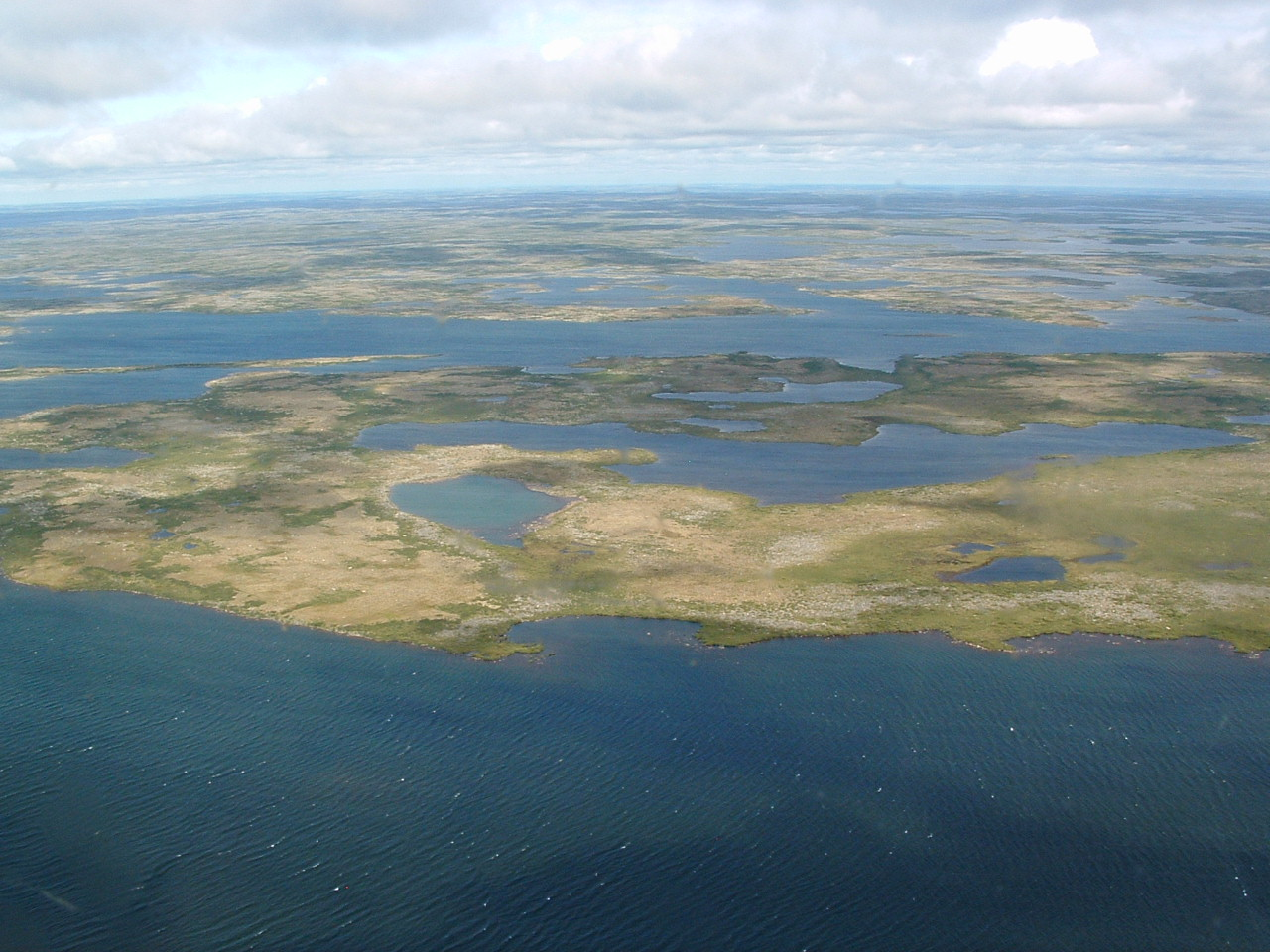

- Location within Quebec
- Location: Rivière-Koksoak, Nunavik, Quebec
- Coordinates: 57°23′30″N 72°45′47″W
- Type: Oligotrophic
- Primary outflows: Charpentier River, Nedlouc River
- Basin countries: Canada
- Max. length: 18 km (11 mi)
- Max. width: 25 km (16 mi)
- Surface area: 44 km^{2} (17 sq mi)
- Surface elevation: 329 m (1,079 ft)
- Islands: Duck Island and many others

Lake Nedlouc is the lake on the top plateau of Ungava Peninsula, Quebec, Canada. Nedlouc (on different maps and publications spelled also Nedluc or Nedluk) is Inuktitut word meaning part of the leg around the knee. Why the lake was named like that is unknown. It is known also by two other Inuktitut names, Nallualuk (meaning unknown) and Tasirtuuq (meaning: many lakes).

Lake is the source of two rivers, Charpentier River on the north-west and Nedlouc River on the north-east. It consists of two major lakes, one on south-east and one of north-west, connected by series of shallow rapids of Charpentier River and smaller lakes. The area is arctic tundra with few stunted trees.
