= Marie-Hélène Cardot =

French resistance leader and politician

Senator for Ardennes
- In office 26 April 1959 – 1 October 1971

Deputy of the Council of the Republic
- In office 8 December 1946 – 26 April 1959

Personal details
- Born: 14 July 1899 Tétaigne, Ardennes, France
- Died: 13 August 1977 (aged 78) Plombières-les-Bains, Vosges, France
- Party: Popular Republican Movement
- Spouse: Ernest Cardot (m. 1918; died 1943)
- Awards: Croix de Guerre 1939–1945; Resistance Medal; Cross of the Order of Leopold; Légion d'honneur à titre militaire

Marie-Hélène Cardot (French: [maʁi elɛn kaʁdo]; 14 July 1899 – 13 August 1977) was a French resistance leader and politician. She conducted clandestine activities, helping prisoners and guerrillas during the Second World War, in which she was twice arrested. Cardot went into politics following the end of the German occupation of France. During her political career, she served in the Council of the Republic, the Senate, of which she was vice-president from 1959 to 1971, and was mayor of Douzy for 18 years. She was a recipient of the Resistance Medal, the Croix de Guerre, the Cross of the Order of Leopold and the Chevaliers of the Légion d'honneur.

== Biography ==
On 14 July 1899, Cardot was born in Tétaigne in Ardennes. She moved to Douzy in Ardennes, where she helped her husband, Ernest Cardot, to manage his family's small metal construction company that he inherited. While France was under German occupation during the Second World War, Cardot and her husband gave escaped prisoners assistance. She was a member of the Organisation civile et militaire, which led to her being arrested by German forces in March 1941 and interned in Sedan until 15 April. Cardot was released due to a lack of evidence. She returned to doing calendstine activities and she and her husband established the maquis of Autrecourt. Cardot helped the guerrillas and escapees on her own after the assassination of her husband on 5 June 1943 by a double agent who had infiltrated their network. She was arrested for a second time on 18 June 1944, by the Gestapo, and was imprisoned in Charleville-Mézières. On 29 August 1944, Cardot and other prisoners were released by resistance members, thereby narrowly avoiding deportation.

Following the conclusion of the Second World War, she went into politics. Cardot joined the municipal council of Douzy in April 1945 and the Departmental Council of Ardennes in the canton of Mouzon in September 1946. She unsuccessfully stood for election to the National Assembly in the Ardennes region in the November 1946 French legislative election but gained election as a Popular Republican Movement (MRP) candidate to the Council of the Republic on 8 December 1946 as one of 21 female elected officials and remained in the seat in the council until the establishment of the French Fifth Republic in 1958. Cardot was a member of the Supply Commission and the Family and Pensions Committee, working on pensions, defended wartime orphans and wartime widows' inheritance rights since she was chair of the Ardennes Association of war widows and orphans and the Departmental Association of deportees and internees. She served as Mayor of Douzy from 1959 to 1977.

At the 1959 French Senate election, Cardot was elected as an MRP (later Centrist Union group from September 1968) senator representing the Ardennes and held the post between 26 April 1959 and 1 October 1971. She was the third female post-war vice-president of the Senate when she was appointed to the position on 5 April 1959. Cardot was chair of the senatorial France-Belgium friendship group between 1959 and 1971 and was a member of the Higher Council for Social Services and the Higher Council for Professional and Social Reclassification For Disabled Workers. She was a rapporteur on the Social Affairs Committee on soldiers' physical injuries during the Algerian War, educating disabled children, children's entertainment employment and guaranteeing employment following motherhood. Cardot left politics after deciding not to run for election to the municipal elections in Douzy in March 1977.

Alain Poher gave her the sobriquet "Saint of the Senate". Cardot was the recipient of the Resistance Medal, the Croix de Guerre, the Cross of the Order of Leopold and the Chevaliers of the Légion d'honneur. On 13 August 1977, she died in the town of Plombières-les-Bains.
