= Francis Caballero =

French lawyer and academic (1940–2024)

- Born: 5 August 1940; Sofia, Bulgaria
- Died: 4 December 2024 (aged 84)
- Education: Paris Nanterre University; Harvard Law School; Paris-Panthéon-Assas University
- Occupation(s): Lawyer; Academic

Francis Caballero (5 August 1940 – 4 December 2024) was a French lawyer and academic. He was a professor of criminal law at Paris Nanterre University and was known for his opposition to the tobacco industry and advocacy in favor of the legality of cannabis.

== Life and career ==
Born in Sofia on 5 August 1940, Caballero studied law at Harvard Law School. He earned a Diplôme national de doctorat in law from Paris-Panthéon-Assas University in 1981 after writing a thesis titled Essai sur la notion juridique de nuisance under the supervision of Jean Rivero. He worked as a law professor at Paris Nanterre University until 2008, teaching criminal law and criminal procedure. A member of the Paris Bar Association, he was a lawyer for the French Anti-Tobacco Committee and published a book titled Nuit gravement au tabac. He was also a member of the Mouvement de légalisation contrôlée de la drogue, defending individuals charged with drug crimes.

Caballero died on 4 December 2024, at the age of 84.

== Publications ==
- Essai sur la notion juridique de nuisance (1981)
- Droit de la drogue (1989)
- Drogues et droits de l'homme (1992)
- Nuit gravement au tabac (2002)
- Droit du sexe (2010)
- Legalize It! (2012)
