= Rivière aux Mélèzes =

Coordinates: 57.6761°N 69.4883°W

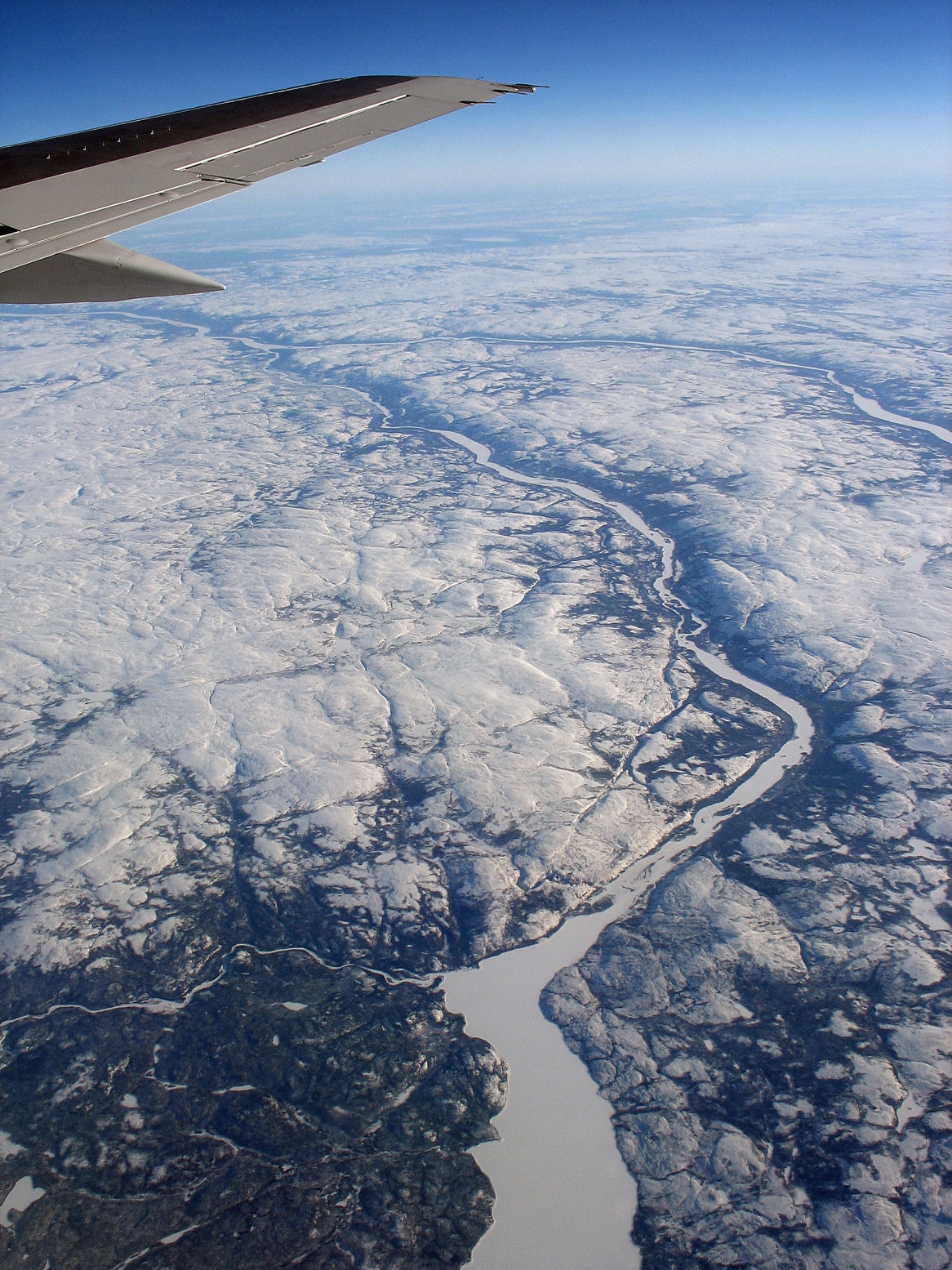
Rivière aux Mélèzes and confluence with Rivière du Gué as seen from airplane.

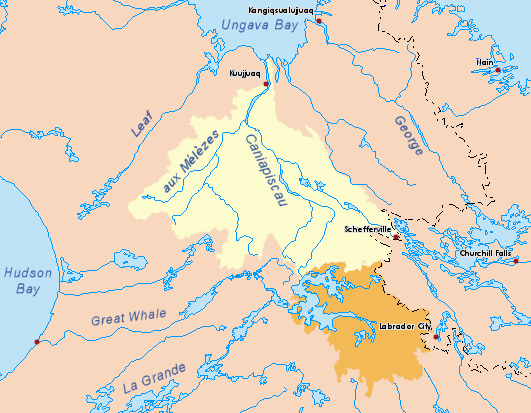
Drainage basin of the Koksoak River with Larch River

The Rivière aux Mélèzes (also previously known as the Larch River and in Inuktitut as Kuuvik) is a river in Nunavik, Quebec, Canada. It forms the western part of the large basin of the Koksoak River. The other main tributary of the Koksoak is the Caniapiscau River, to the south.

The English name "Larch River" probably comes from the larch trees found in the sheltered valley of the river, which is, in less sheltered locations, as much as 400 kilometres beyond the northern limit of tree growth. Most of the basin is covered by sparse tundra and it remains uninhabited, even by Inuit. Owing to the intense glaciation, the basin is generally flat and does not rise to elevations beyond three hundred metres above sea level even after major post-glacial rebound. The climate is polar (Köppen ET) with temperatures ranging from about −20 °C (−4 °F) in January to 8 °C (46 °F) in July.

The river probably flowed into Hudson Bay before the Pleistocene. However, the fact that for ninety percent of the Quaternary Nunavik has been covered with glacial ice up to four kilometres thick has meant that, during the very brief deglaciations, ice dams and/or moraines have tended to prevent the river from flowing westwards. Hence, during the brief periods of deglaciation (generally only the latter half of interglacials), the river has flowed into the Koksoak River.
