= Alexandra Carpentier =

French mathematical statistician

Alexandra Carpentier is a French mathematical statistician and machine learning researcher known for her work in stochastic optimization, compressed sensing, and multi-armed bandit problems. She works in Germany as a professor at University of Potsdam and head of the Mathematical Statistics & Machine Learning research group.

== Education and career ==
After studying probability theory, statistics, and economics at Paris Diderot University and ENSAE Paris, Carpentier earned a doctorate in 2012 through research at the French Institute for Research in Computer Science and Automation (Inria) in Lille.

She was a postdoctoral researcher at the University of Cambridge from 2012 through 2015, and then in 2015 became a professor at the University of Potsdam, funded through the Emmy Noether program of the German Research Foundation. In 2017 she moved to Otto von Guericke University Magdeburg. Currently, she is a professor at the University of Potsdam.

== Recognition ==
Carpentier received the 2020 von Kaven Award of the German Research Foundation.
