= Jean-Jacques Beauvarlet-Charpentier =

French organist and composer

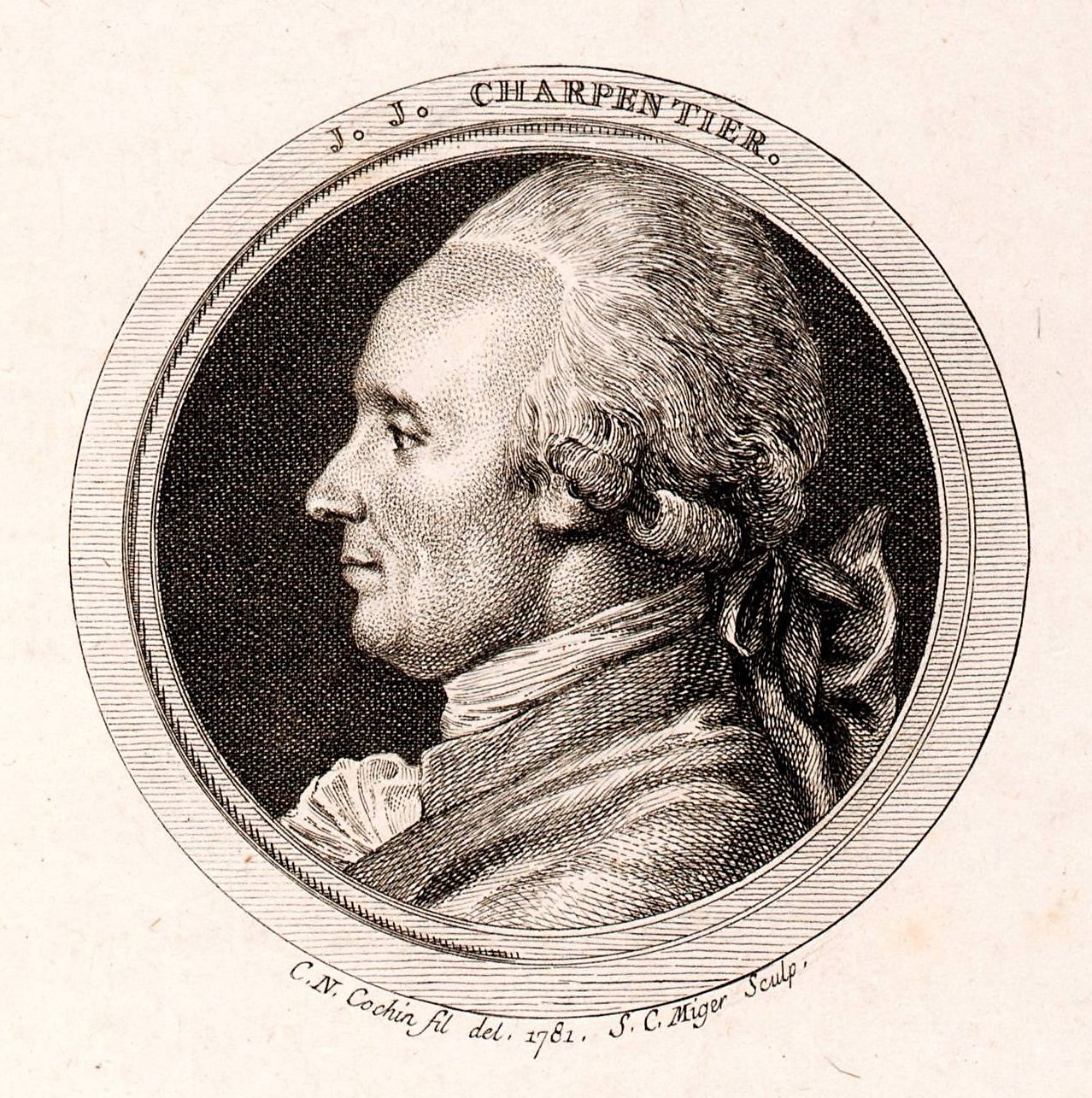
French organist and composer Jean-Jacques Beauvarlet-Charpentier (1734-1794)

Jean-Jacques Beauvarlet-Charpentier (28 June 1734 – 6 May 1794) was a celebrated French organist and composer.

He was born in Abbeville. From 1763, he was a member of the Académie des Beaux Arts de Lyon (now École des Beaux-Arts). Then, from 1783 to 1793, he was organist at the Notre Dame de Paris.

Beauvarlet-Charpentier composed sonatas for keyboard and violin and numerous pieces for organ. He died in Paris.

His son Jacques-Marie (1766–1834) was also an organist and composer.

== Discography ==
- Jean-Jacques Beauvarlet-Charpentier, œuvres pour orgue. Marina Tchebourkina aux grandes orgues historiques de l’Abbatiale Sainte-Croix de Bordeaux. CD I–II. — Paris : Natives, 2007. EAN 3760075340087
