= Illouz =

Illouz is a surname. Notable people with the surname include:

- Eva Illouz (born 1961), Israeli sociologist
- Yves-Gérard Illouz (1929–2015), French plastic surgeon
