= Charpentier River =

Coordinates: 57°24′29″N 72°49′24″W

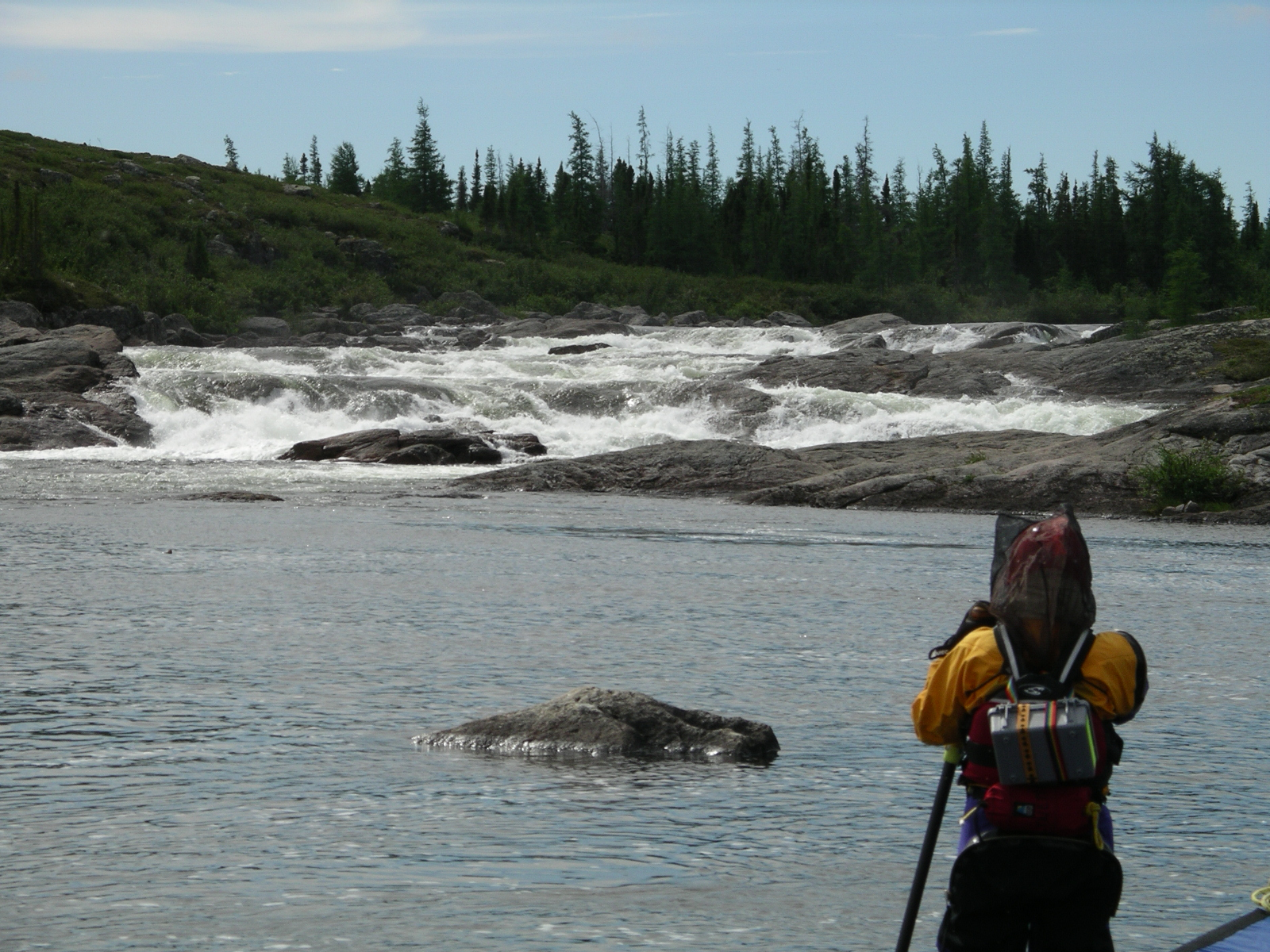
- Chutes de Burin

Location
- Country: Canada

Physical characteristics
- Source
  - location: Lac Nedlouc, Nunavik, Quebec
  - elevation: 329 m (1,079 ft)
- Mouth
  - location: Lake Minto, Nunavik, Quebec
  - elevation: 181 m (594 ft)
- Length: 125 km (78 mi)

Charpentier River is a river in northern Quebec (Ungava Peninsula), Canada, that flows from Lac Nedlouc for about 125 km (78 mi) northwest to Lake Minto. A rarely paddled river, it flows through tundra & taiga. It has several waterfalls, namely Chutes de Burin and Chute Bleu. It is one of the main tributaries of the Leaf River.
