= Jacques-Marie Beauvarlet-Charpentier =

French organist and composer

Jacques-Marie Beauvarlet-Charpentier (31 July 1766 – 7 September 1834) was a French organist and composer.

== Biography ==
Born in Lyon, Jacques-Marie Beauvarlet-Charpentier succeeded his father Jean-Jacques Beauvarlet Charpentier at the pipe organ of the Église Saint-Paul. After the French Revolution, he got the incumbent position at Saint-Germain-des-Prés, and in 1815, that of Saint-Eustache.

In addition to vocal works on patriotic and sacred texts, he is also responsible for Pièces pour piano-forte, Romances, 6 Magnificat, 2 Te Deum, 6 Hymnes pour les principales fêtes de l'année, 15 noëls, organ masses, a Journal d'orgue published from 1822.

The best known piece of Jacques-Marie Beauvarlet-Charpentier is Victoire de l'Armée d'Italie or Bataille de Montenotte, for forte-piano, or organ, published in Paris c. 1797.

He died in Paris on 7 September 1834.

== Bibliography ==
- Honegger, Marc (1970). Dictionnaire de la musique : les hommes et leurs œuvres (in French). Paris: Éditions Bordas. p. 590. BnF 35111352r.
- Journal des Artistes Obituary.
- David Fuller and Bruce Gustafson. Beauvarlet-Charpentier, Jacques-Marie Grove Music Online. Oxford Music Online. Oxford University Press. Web. 8 November 2012.
