= Paul Claude-Michel Carpentier =

French painter

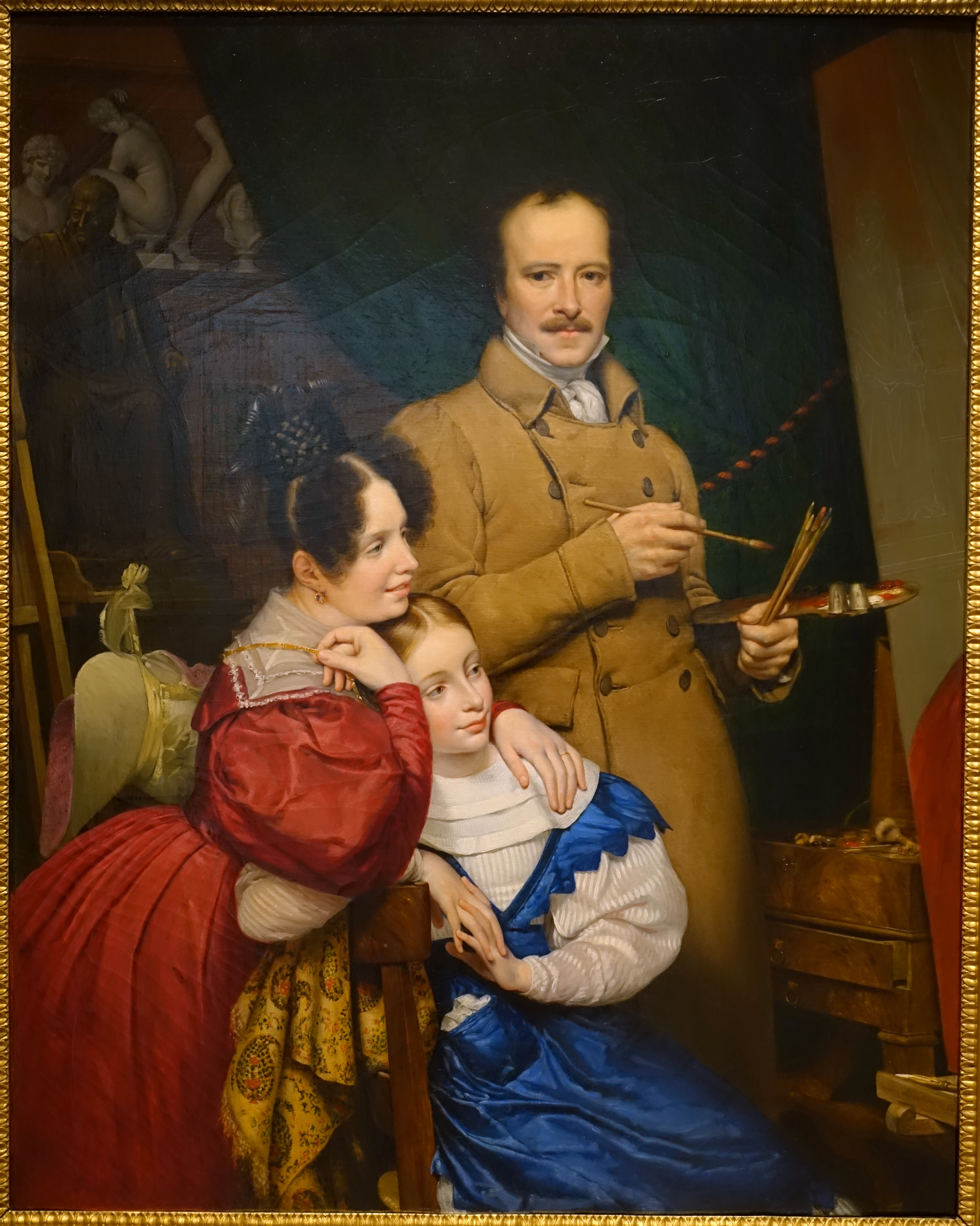
Self-portrait with family, 1833

Paul Claude-Michel Carpentier (27 November 1787 in Rouen – 10 May 1877 in Paris) was a French portrait, genre, history painter and author. He studied with Jean-Jacques Lebarbier (1738–1826) and briefly with Jacques-Louis David (1748–1825). Until 1824 he exhibited at the Salons under his family name LeCarpentier, but after 1824 shortened his last name to Carpentier.

In 1825 Carpentier earned a silver and bronze medal respectively at salons in Douai and Lille for his painting A Painter in His Studio Giving Advice to his Young Student. Then he exhibited at the Paris Salons from 1827-1839.

== Encaustic painting ==
Carpentier often made his paintings using the encaustic painting method, an ancient process that uses melted wax as a binder for pigment. Because of this interest, in 1875 he wrote the monograph Note Sur à la Peinture la Cire Cautérisée ou Procéde Encaustique which addresses all aspects of the process from softening the wax, mixing the colors with wax, the proper preparation of canvas, walls, stone, and panels, whether wood or zinc. Then follows with how to create a matte or glossy finish and concludes with examples of antique encaustic works at the Louvre that testify to the method’s durability. The article includes images of the tools to melt wax as well as a recommended plan and layout for one’s paint box. Today the monograph remains a valuable resource for painting conservators.

== Notice sur Daguerre ==
Carpentier was a friend of Louis-Jacques-Mandé Daguerre (1787–1851) and in 1855 he wrote Notice sur Daguerre, which is a first hand account of the invention of photography and the diorama.

== Societies ==
Throughout his life Carpentier was quite involved in the Société Libre de Beaux-Arts. He was a founding member of Société de Secour Mutuels entre les Artistes, an organization that provided financial support to infirmed and elderly artists as well as their surviving widows and children.

== Museum collections ==
American museums owning works by Carpentier include Dallas Museum of Art and Frances Lehman Loeb Art Center at Vassar College. French museums with works by Carpentier include: Musée des Beaux-Arts de Rouen (Rouen), Musee Carnavalet (Paris), French Society of Photography (Paris), Musée d’art d’archéologie et de sciences naturelles (Troy), Musée des Beaux-arts - Valenciennes (Valenciennes), Musée national des Châteaux de Versailles et de Trianon (Versailles), Sarlet-la Canéda muse d’histoire de Sarlet et du Périgora Noir, Musée de Montagris, Society Française de Photographie (Paris) and Musée Carnavalet (Paris).
