= Louis-Jean Calvet =

French linguist (1942–2025)

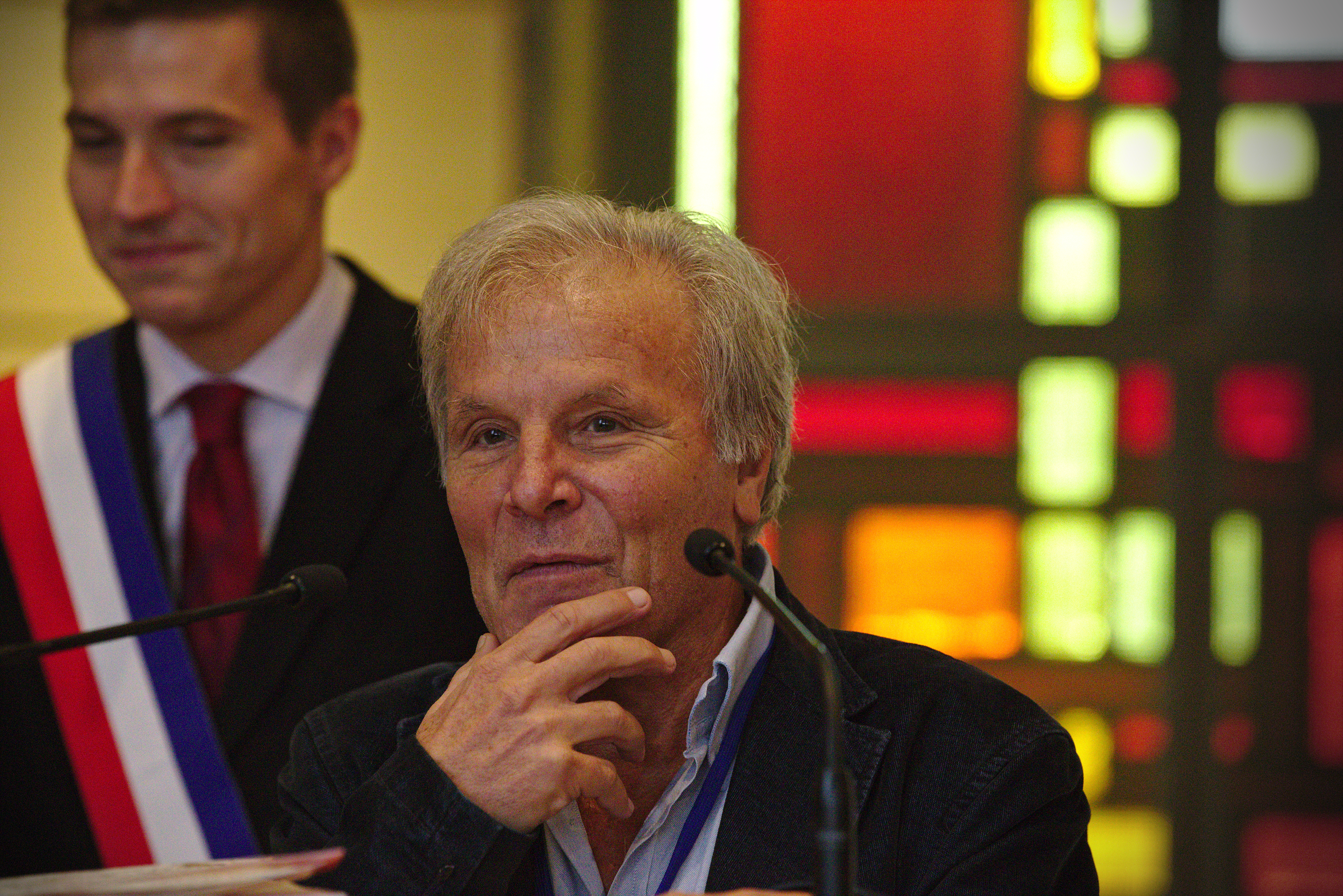
Louis-Jean Calvet receiving the Ptolemy Prize during the 2016 International Geography Festival.

Louis-Jean Calvet (5 June 1942 – 29 October 2025) was a French linguist.

== Biography ==
As a student at the University of Nice, where he was a student of linguist Pierre Guiraud, Calvet was elected in 1964 to the national bureau of the Union Nationale des Étudiants de France. There, he was in charge of information and held the position of chief editor for the monthly publication 21.27. Then, as a student at the Sorbonne with André Martinet, he pursued a doctoral thesis titled Le système des sigles en français contemporain ("The System of Acronyms in Contemporary France"), and then another doctorate on "Langue, corps, société" ("Language, Body, Society"). Calvet was first professor at Paris Descartes University, and then at Aix-Marseille University, a position that he held until 2012.

From his first publication (Linguistique et colonialisme, in which he first introduced his concept of glottophagy), he has analyzed the relationships between linguistic discourse and colonial discourse on languages, as well as the links between language and power (La Guerre des langues, 1987) and the linguistic role of cities (Les Voix de la ville, 1994). He thus participated in the creation of a French field of sociolinguistics, of which he is one of the most well known representatives. His works have been translated in over twenty languages, and he has been invited to speak at numerous universities all over the world.

Having been the director of the Languages and Societies collection at the publishing house Payot for several years, he has published the works of authors such as Sylvain Auroux, André Martinet, André Chervel, Christian Cuxac, Tullio De Mauro, Ivan Fonagy, Pierre Guiraud, Nancy Huston, Morris Swadesh, Jean-Didier Urbain, Marina Yaguello, etc. In addition to his academic activities, Calvet is also a journalist, contributing to the weekly publication Politique hebdo, in which he takes on cultural phenomena, in particular music, from a sociological and political standpoint, as well as writing about ethnic and linguistic minorities.

== Publications ==
- 1969 : Dynamique des groupes et pédagogie, Bureau pour l'enseignement de la langue et de la civilisation françaises à l'étranger
- 1973 : Roland Barthes; un regard politique sur le signe, Payot (Petite bibliothèque Payot)
- 1974 : Linguistique et colonialisme, petit traité de glottophagie, Payot (Petite bibliothèque Payot); traduit en allemand ("Die Sprachenfresser. Ein Versuch über Linguistik und Kolonialismus", 1978)
- 1975 : Pour et contre Saussure : vers une linguistique sociale Payot (Petite bibliothèque Payot)
- Marxisme et linguistique. Marx, Engels, Lafargue, Staline, précédé de Sous les pavés de Staline la plage de Freud?, Paris, Payot, coll. "Langages et sociétés", 1977.
- 1978 : Faut-il brûler Sardou ?, avec Jean-Claude Klein, Savelli
- 1980 : Les Sigles, PUF (Que sais-je ?, n° 1811)
- 1981 : Les Langues véhiculaires, PUF (Que sais-je ?, n° 1916)
- 1984 : La Tradition orale, PUF (Que sais-je ?, n° 2122)
- 1985 : direction du dossier « Les musiques métissées » de la revue Vibrations. Musiques, médias, société
- 1988 : direction du dossier « La scène » de la revue Vibrations. Musiques, médias, société
- 1990 : Roland Barthes, Flammarion
- 1993 : La Sociolinguistique, PUF (Que sais-je ?, n° 2731)
- 1994 : L'Argot, PUF (Que sais-je ?, n° 700)
- 1994 : Les Voix de la ville, Introduction à la sociolinguistique urbaine, Payot
- 1996 : Les Politiques linguistiques, PUF (Que sais-je ?, n° 3075)
- 1996 : Histoire de l'écriture, Plon
- 1999 : Pour une écologie des langues du monde, Plon
- 2003 : Léo Ferré, Flammarion
- 2004 : Essais de linguistique, la langue est-elle une invention des linguistes ?, Plon
- 2006 : 100 ans de chanson française, l'Archipel
- 2006 : Combat pour l'Élysée, en collaboration avec Jean Véronis, Seuil
- 2008 : Les Mots de Nicolas Sarkozy, en collaboration avec Jean Véronis, Seuil
- 2010 : Le Jeu du signe, Seuil
- 2010 : Le Français en Afrique, l'Archipel
- 2011 : Il était une fois 7000 langues, Fayard
- 2013 : Chansons, la bande son de notre histoire, l'Archipel
- 2013 : Les Confettis de Babel. Diversité linguistique et politique des langues, en collaboration avec Alain Calvet, Ecriture
- 2014 : Georges Moustaki, une vie, l'Archipel
- 2016 : La Méditerranée, mer de nos langues, CNRS éditions
- 2019 : My tailor is still rich, les glottotropies à travers l'histoire de la méthode Assimil, CNRS éditions

== Honours ==
He was awarded the Sociolinguists Worldwide Award in 2012, the Ptolemy prize from the International Forum of Geography in 2016, and the George Dumézil prize from the Académie Française in 2017 for his word La Méditerranée, mer de nos langues ("The Mediterranean, sea of our languages").
