= Ardennes's 3rd constituency =

Constituency of the National Assembly of France

3rd constituency of Ardennes
- inline Constituency of the National Assembly of France

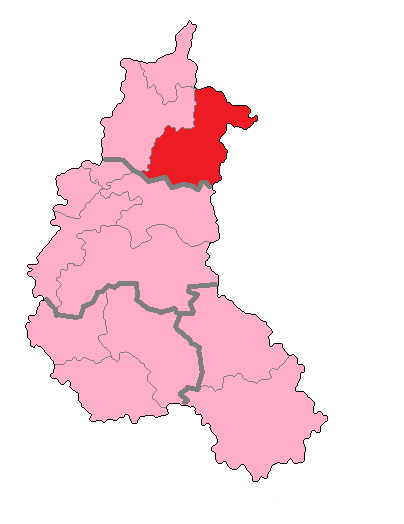
- Ardennes' 3rd Constituency shown with Champagne-Ardenne
- Deputy: Jean-Luc Warsmann; DVD
- Department: Ardennes
- Cantons: Attigny, Buzancy, Carignan, Chesne, Grandpré, Machault, Monthois, Mouzon, Raucourt-et-Flaba, Sedan-Est, Sedan-Nord, Sedan-Ouest, Tourteron, Vouziers
- Registered voters: 58,526

The 3rd constituency of the Ardennes is a French legislative constituency in the Ardennes département. It is currently represented by Jean-Luc Warsmann of the centre-right.

== Description ==
It is located in the south east third of the department, around the town of Sedan.

== Deputies ==
Election	Member	Party
1958	Roger Noiret	UNR
1962	Roger Noiret	UNR
1967	André Lebon	PSU
1968	Jacques Sourdille	UDR
1973	Jacques Sourdille	UDR
1978	Jacques Sourdille	RPR
1981	Gilles Charpentier	PS
1986	Proportional representation - no election by constituency	
1988	Gérard Istace	PS
1993	Claude Vissac	DVD
1995	Jean-Luc Warsmann	RPR
1997	Jean-Luc Warsmann	RPR
2002	Jean-Luc Warsmann	UMP
2007	Jean-Luc Warsmann	UMP
2012	Jean-Luc Warsmann	UMP
2017	Jean-Luc Warsmann	LR
2022	Jean-Luc Warsmann	DVD
2024	Jean-Luc Warsmann	DVD

== Election results ==
=== 2024 ===
Candidate	Party	Alliance	First round		Second round	
Candidate	Party	Alliance	Votes	%	Votes	%
Jean-Luc Warsmann	DVD		15,362	43.56	19,506	54.44
Isabelle Roger	RN		15,296	43.38	16,321	45.56
Sophie Perrin	LFI	NFP	4,139	11.74		
Laure Augier	LO		466	1.32		
Valid votes			35,263	98.31	35,827	97.90
Blank votes			349	0.97	519	1.42
Null votes			258	0.72	250	0.68
Turnout			35,870	65.84	36,596	67.16
Abstentions			18,614	34.16	17,895	32.84
Registered voters			54,484		54,491	
Result			DVD HOLD			

=== 2022 ===
Legislative Election 2022: Ardennes's 3rd constituency
Party	Candidate	Votes	%	±%
DVD (UDC)	Jean-Luc Warsmann	12,332	47.69	+1.50
RN	Dave Lemoine	5,758	22.27	+4.71
LFI (NUPÉS)	Sophie Perrin	3,822	14.78	−5.22
LREM (Ensemble)	Estelle Drion	2,235	8.64	−5.87
REC	Bruno North	923	3.57	N/A
Others	N/A	787	-	−
Turnout		25,857	47.61	−2.31
2nd round result
DVD (UDC)	Jean-Luc Warsmann	15,575	67.75	-6.97
RN	David Lemoine	7,415	32.25	+6.97
Turnout		22,990	43.72	−1.05
DVD gain from LR				

=== 2017 ===
Candidate	Label	First round		Second round	
Candidate	Label	Votes	%	Votes	%
Jean-Luc Warsmann	LR	12,931	46.19	17,678	74.72
Amandine Blomme	FN	4,917	17.56	5,980	25.28
Christelle Vorillion	REM	4,063	14.51		
Didier Herbillon	PS	2,591	9.25		
Sophie Perrin	FI	2,528	9.03		
Dalila Maouche	PCF	328	1.17		
Christelle Gallet	ECO	211	0.75		
Cédric Sauvage	ECO	155	0.55		
Roselyne de Balmain	DIV	141	0.50		
Nadia Octave	EXG	131	0.47		
Votes		27,996	100.00	23,658	100.00
Valid votes		27,996	98.32	23,658	92.66
Blank votes		310	1.09	1,312	5.14
Null votes		168	0.59	563	2.20
Turnout		28,474	49.92	25,533	44.77
Abstentions		28,567	50.08	31,503	55.23
Registered voters		57,041		57,036	
Source: Ministry of the Interior

=== 2012 ===
Legislative Election 2012: Ardennes' 3rd
Party	Candidate	Votes	%	±%
UMP	Jean-Luc Warsmann	18,285	52.50	−4.98
PS	Nelly Fesseau	10,231	29.38	N/A
FN	Laurent Guilbert	4,051	11.63	+7.72
FG	Claudette Moraine	1,183	3.40	N/A
LV	Sophie Perrin	737	2.12	+0.64
DVE	Marie-Claude Bihin-Dury	931	2.57	+1.73
Far left	Nadia Octave	129	0.37	−0.30
Other	André Trotin	42	0.12	N/A
Turnout		35,214	60.17	
UMP hold		Swing		

=== 2007 ===
Legislative Election 2007: Ardennes 3rd
Party	Candidate	Votes	%	±%
UMP	Jean-Luc Warsmann	20,829	57.46	−0.50
DVG	Jean-Paul Bachy	8,939	24.66	N/A
FN	Eric Samyn	1,418	3.91	−7.50
MoDem	Olivier Laurant	1,118	3.08	N/A
MRC	Gisèle Dessieux	931	2.57	+2.25
PCF	Régine Henry	811	2.24	N/A
LCR	Hélène Mathieu	605	1.67	N/A
LV	Maylis Magnou	538	1.48	−0.76
MEI	Jean Perrard	304	0.84	N/A
MNR	Hervé Lahotte	265	0.73	−0.55
MPF	Adeline Tillette	252	0.70	N/A
LO	Jacques Boissier	242	0.67	−1.25
Turnout		40,411	61.01	+3.64
UMP hold		Swing		

=== 2002 ===
Legislative Election 2002: Ardennes's 3rd constituency
Party	Candidate	Votes	%	±%
UMP	Jean-Luc Warsmann	21,500	57.96	
PS	Elisabeth Husson	8,758	23.61	
FN	Eric Samyn	4,231	11.41	
LV	Eléonora Rossi	832	2.24	
Others	N/A	1,773		
Turnout		37,611	64.65	
UMP hold				

=== 1997 ===
Legislative Election 1997: Ardennes's 3rd constituency
Party	Candidate	Votes	%	±%
RPR	Jean-Luc Warsmann	16,024	39.69	
PS	Jean-Paul Bachy	10,874	26.94	
FN	Anne-Marie Dalbe	6,791	16.82	
PCF	Régine Henry	2,744	6.80	
LO	Laurence Boulinier	998	2.47	
LV	Guy Hannesse	979	2.43	
GE	Georges le Néchet	867	2.15	
Others	N/A	1,091		
Turnout		41,695	72.16	
2nd round result
RPR	Jean-Luc Warsmann	23,436	55.86	
PS	Jean-Paul Bachy	18,517	44.14	
Turnout		43,922	76.02	
RPR hold				

== Sources ==
- French Interior Ministry results website: "Résultats électoraux officiels en France" (in French).
