= Gilles Charpentier =

French politician (born 1927)

Gilles Albert Célestin Joël Charpentier (French pronunciation: [ʒil albɛʁ selɛstɛ̃ ʒɔɛl ʃaʁpɑ̃tje]; 1 September 1927 – 24 January 2024) was a French retired politician. He served as Socialist Member of Parliament for Ardennes's 3rd constituency from 1981 to 1986.

His grandfather was Léon Charpentier, a former senator.
