= Jean Carpentier =

French historian (1933–2018)

Jean Carpentier (26 September 1933 – 6 March 2018) was a French historian.

Jean Carpentier was an Honorary Inspector General of National Education.

== Biography ==
He was married to Élisabeth Carpentier, also a historian, professor of medieval history at the University of Poitiers, who participated in the works edited by Jean Carpentier and François Lebrun. She has also written books on the battles of Poitiers and on Romanesque art with Marie-Thérèse Camus.

== Bibliography ==
- Histoire de France, éd. Seuil, 1987, with François Lebrun.
- Histoire de l'Europe, with François Lebrun, Seuil, 1992.
- Histoire de la Méditerranée, with François Lebrun, Seuil, 2001.
