= Black Bomb A =

French band

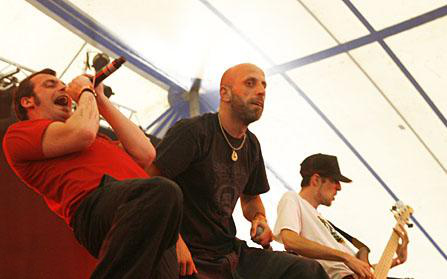
- Black Bomb A at Dour-Festival 2006

Background information
- Origin: Viroflay, France
- Genres: Groove metal, metalcore, nu metal
- Members: Arno; Poun; Snake; Jacou; Hervé
- Past members: Djag; Etienne; Mario; Scalp; Franck
- Website: www.blackbomba.com

Black Bomb A is a French old school hardcore/crossover band founded in 1995.

== History ==
In 2003, the band consisted of two singers, Arno and Poun, guitarists Scalp and Snake, bassist Mario, and drummer Hervé.

In 2001, they entered the spotlight for the first time with the self-released EP Straight in the Vein. Within two years, Blackbomb A developed into a well-known underground band, with about 300 appearances in France.

Their third album Speech of Freedom held a spot on the French Billboard charts for seven weeks, and was noted for its "angry experimentation-joy", unique in metalcore.

The live album Illicite Stuff Live from 2005 contains recordings from concerts in Saint Nazaire. The album was released in September 2005 amidst the planning of a live tour. After a motorcycle accident involving the bassist Étienne, the band had to cancel the tour. At the beginning of 2006 they began recording a studio album but production was eventually placed on hold, as collaboration with the producer proved difficult. As a result, Black Bomb A separated from their label.

Through collaboration with Sphere they acquired new management at the Warner-Music offshoot Mon Slip. In March 2007, Blackbomb A released their album One Sound Bite to React. The band had evolved both vocally and musically. The album includes a cover version "Beds are Burning" by Midnight Oil, but they remained true to their metalcore roots.

In 2016, they released the live album 21 Years of Pure Madness / Live Act and played at Edinburgh Metal Party 2016.

== Members ==
=== Current line-up ===
- Poun – vocals (1995-)
- Snake – guitar (1996-)
- Arno – vocals (2002–2007, 2014-)
- Etienne - bass (2004–2011, 2023-)
- Jordan Kiefer - drums (2023-)

=== Past members ===
- Max (IV) – guitar (1995–1996)
- Panks – bass (1995–1999)
- Franck – drums (1995–2001)
- Djag – vocals (1995–2002, 2007–2011)
- Mario – bass (1999–2004)
- Scalp – guitar (1999–2008)
- Shaun Davidson – vocals (2011–2014)
- Pierre Jacou - bass (2011–2023)
- Hervé Coquerel – drums (2001–2023)

== Discography ==
- 1999: Straight in the Vein
- 2001: Human Bomb
- 2004: Speech of Freedom
- 2005: Illicite Stuf Live
- 2006: One Sound Bite to React
- 2009: From Chaos
- 2012: Enemies of the State
- 2015: Comfortable Hate
- 2016: 21 Years of Pure Madness / Live Act
- 2018: Black Bomb A
- 2024: Unbuild The World
