= Axis powers negotiations on the division of Asia =

Axis planning efforts during World War II

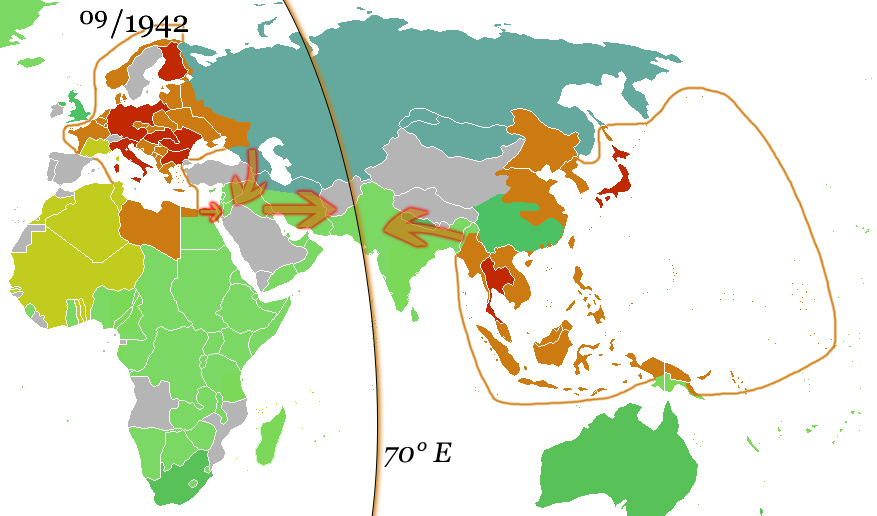
German and Japanese direct spheres of influence at their greatest extents in fall 1942. Arrows show planned movements to the proposed demarcation line at 70° E, which was, however, never even approximated.

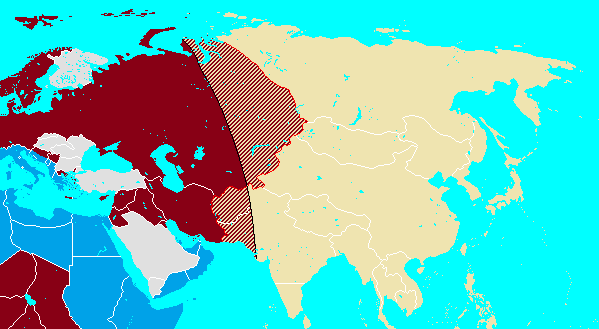
Map showing the possible borders of a partitioned USSR (which includes planned annexations of other areas). Shaded areas show possible disputes that could have arisen. Nazi Germany/Lebensraum Italian Empire/Spazio vitale Empire of Japan/Dai Tōa Kyōeiken Borders proposed by Japan Borders proposed by Germany

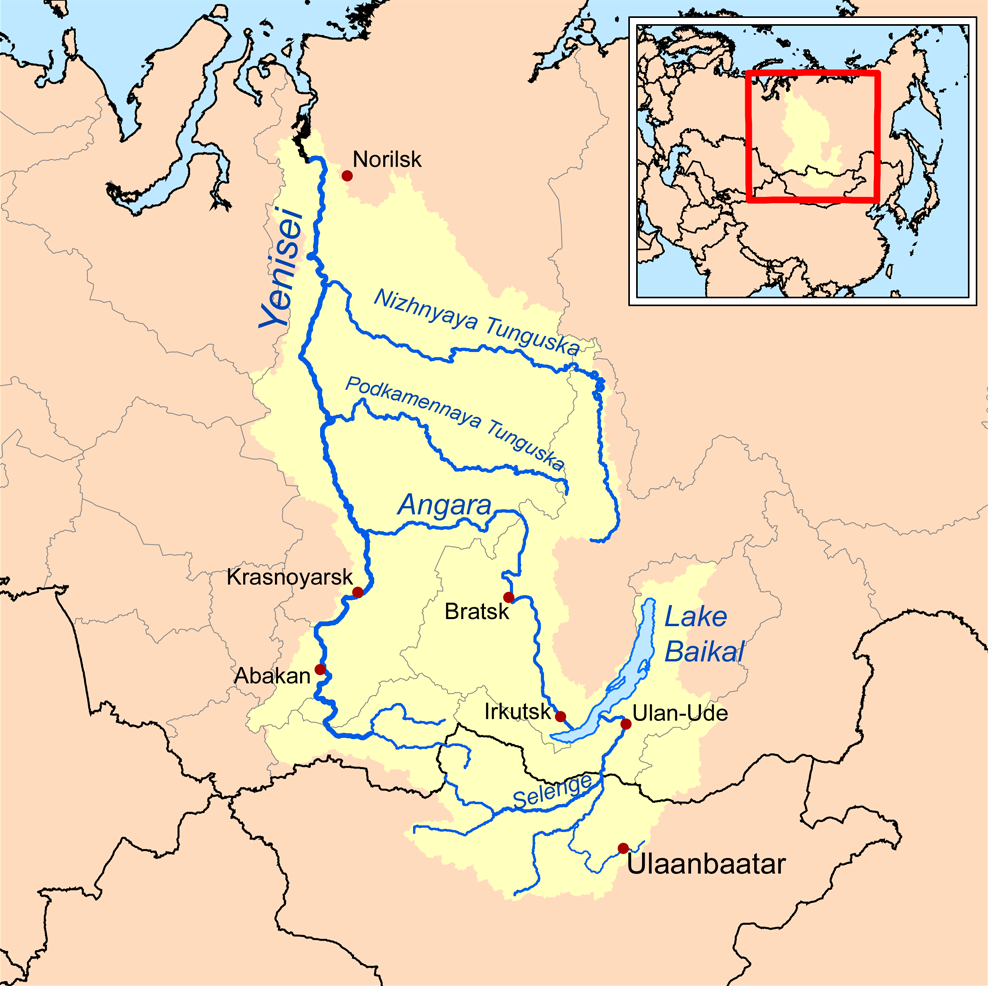
The Yenisei River basin in Siberia

As the Axis powers of Germany, Italy, and Japan cemented their military alliance by mutually declaring war against the United States on December 11, 1941, the Japanese proposed a clear territorial arrangement with the two main European Axis powers concerning the Asian continent. On December 15, they presented the Germans with a drafted military convention that would delimit the continent of Asia into two separate "operational spheres" (zones of military responsibility) by a dividing line along the 70th meridian east longitude, going southwards through the Ob River's Arctic estuary, southwards to just east of Khost in Afghanistan and heading into the Indian Ocean just west of Rajkot in India, to split the Lebensraum land holdings of Germany and the similar spazio vitale areas of Italy to the west of it, and the Empire of Japan (and the Greater East Asia Co-Prosperity Sphere) to the east of it, after a complete defeat of the Soviet Union by the Third Reich.

The Germans initially disliked this proposal, as diplomats feared that it was a front for establishing a precedent for the specific delimitation of political spheres. The German Army was also disappointed that it failed to contain any promises for Japan entering the war against the Soviet Union, or even to halt shipments of U.S. supplies through the Soviet Pacific port of Vladivostok.

The arbitrary border was further criticised by the Wehrmacht's office of military economy (Wi Rü Amt) because it cut through territories and states that comprised organic economic units whose parts were mutually dependent on each other. It instead proposed a division that would follow existing international boundaries, along the eastern border of Iran, the northern border of Afghanistan, the western border of China up to Tannu Tuva, and then northwards along the Yenisei River to the Arctic Ocean. Despite assigning all of British India and Afghanistan to Japan, this would give Germany a better and more easily defensible frontier in Siberia, and also grant it control over the Kuznetsk industrial basin in addition to the rich iron ore deposits of the eastern Ural mountains. Adolf Hitler found the Japanese proposal acceptable and approved it in full, possibly because he did not envisage Germany seizing much, if any, Soviet territory beyond the Ural Mountains.

The plan of the Third Reich for fortifying its own Lebensraum territory's eastern limits, beyond which the Co-Prosperity Sphere's northwestern frontier areas would exist in Northeast Asia, involved the creation of a "living wall" of Wehrbauer ("soldier-peasant") communities defending it. However, it is unknown if the Axis powers ever formally negotiated a possible, complementary second demarcation line that would have divided the Western Hemisphere.

== See also ==
- A–A line
- Germany–Japan relations during World War II
- Hakkō ichiu
- Hokushin-ron and Nanshin-ron
- Italian imperialism under fascism
- Monsun Gruppe, German–Japanese naval cooperation in the Indian Ocean theatre
- New Order (Nazism)
- Operation Orient
- Treaty of Tordesillas – 1494 treaty dividing the unclaimed world between Spanish and Portuguese sovereignty
- Ural Mountains in Nazi planning
