= A–A line =

Military goal of Operation Barbarossa

Arkhangelsk and Astrakhan, with Leningrad, Moscow, and Stalingrad (strategic cities at the limits of Germany's actual advance) also shown.

The Arkhangelsk–Astrakhan line, (Note: Russian: Архангельск — Астрахань, romanized: Arkhangelsk — Astrakhan; German: AA-Linie, A-A-Linie) (Note: Arkhangelsk is often rendered in English as 'Archangel', its literal translation.) or A–A line for short, was the military goal of Operation Barbarossa. It is also known as the Volga–Arkhangelsk line, as well as (more rarely) the Volga–Arkhangelsk–Astrakhan line. (Note: This may in fact be its full name; German copies of Führerweisung Nr. 21 show this portion of the document as "(...) der algemeinen Linie Wolga–Archangelsk-A [unreadable word] (...)".) It was first mentioned on 18 December 1940 in Führer Directive 21 (Fall Barbarossa) which enunciated the set goals and conditions of the German invasion of the Soviet Union, describing the attainment of the "general line Volga–Arkhangelsk" as its overall military objective.

== Background ==
The line had its origins in an earlier military study carried out in the summer of 1940 by General Erich Marcks called the Operation Draft East. This report advocated the occupation of the Soviet Union up to the line "Arkhangelsk–Gorky–Rostov" in order to prevent it from being a threat to Germany in the future and "protect it against enemy bombers". Marcks envisioned that the campaign, including the capture of Moscow and beyond, would require between nine and seventeen weeks (2–4 months) to complete.

The hypothetical A–A line was to stretch from the port city of Arkhangelsk on the White Sea in northern Russia to the port city of Astrakhan at the mouth of the Volga River on the Caspian Sea. Germany's invasion of the Soviet Union failed to secure any of these objectives.

== Goals ==
The plan was for the Red Army west of the line to be defeated in a quick military campaign in 1941, before the onset of winter. The Wehrmacht assumed that the majority of Soviet military supplies and the main part of the food and population potential of the Soviet Union existed in the lands that lay to the west of the proposed A–A line. If the line was reached, the Soviet Union would also be deprived of around 86% of its petroleum assets (oil territories in the Caucasus).

The A–A line as the end-goal of military hostilities was chosen because an occupation of the entire Soviet Union in a single military campaign was considered impossible in view of its geographic dimensions. The remaining Soviet industrial centers further eastward were planned to be destroyed by aerial bombardment, for which an entire Luftflotte ("air fleet"; equivalent in status to an army group) was to be assigned.

== See also ==
- Axis power negotiations on the division of Asia
- Generalplan Ost
- Operation Barbarossa
- Timeline of the Eastern Front of World War II
- Ural Mountains in Nazi planning
- Wehrbauer
