= Greater East Asia Co-Prosperity Sphere =

World War II era Pan-Asian union under the Empire of Japan

大東亜共栄圏 Greater East Asia Co-Prosperity Sphere
- Members of the Greater East Asia Co-Prosperity Sphere and territories occupied by the Japanese army at maximum height in 1943. Japan and its Axis ally Thailand are in dark red; occupied territory of puppet states in lined dots; puppet states are in light red; Japanese occupied territory in pink. Korea, Taiwan, Karafuto (South Sakhalin), and Chishima (Kuril) Archipelago were formally part of Japan.
- De jure membership: Japan; Thailand Japanese puppet states: Manchukuo; Mengjiang; Wang Jingwei regime; Philippines; Burma; Vietnam; Kampuchea; Laos; Azad Hind

Greater East Asia Co-Prosperity Sphere

Japanese name
- Kana: だいとうあきょうえいけん
- Kyūjitai: 大東亞共榮圈
- Shinjitai: 大東亜共栄圏
Transcriptions
- Revised Hepburn: Dai Tōa Kyōeiken

The Greater East Asia Co-Prosperity Sphere (Japanese: 大東亜共栄圏, Hepburn: Dai Tōa Kyōeiken; Kyujitai: 大東亞共榮圈), also known as the GEACPS, was a pan-Asian union that the Empire of Japan tried to establish. Initially, it covered Japan (including annexed Korea), Manchukuo, and China, but as the Pacific War progressed, it also included territories in Southeast Asia and parts of India. The term was first coined by Minister for Foreign Affairs Hachirō Arita on June 29, 1940.

The proposed objectives of this union were to ensure economic self-sufficiency and cooperation among the member states, along with resisting the influence of Western imperialism and Soviet communism. In reality, militarists and nationalists saw it as an effective propaganda tool to enforce Japanese hegemony. The latter approach was reflected in a document released by Japan's Ministry of Health and Welfare, An Investigation of Global Policy with the Yamato Race as Nucleus, which promoted Japanese supremacist theories. Japanese spokesmen openly described the Greater East Asia Co-Prosperity Sphere as a device for the "development of the Japanese race." When World War II ended, the Greater East Asia Co-Prosperity Sphere became a source of criticism and scorn for the Allies.

== Development of the concept ==
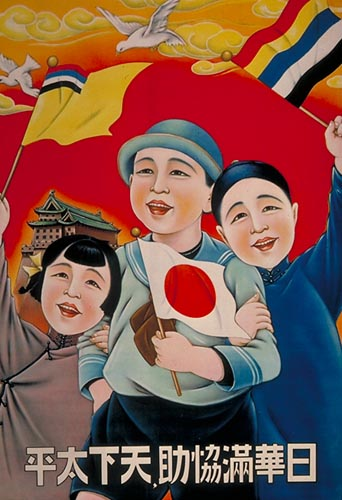
1935 propaganda poster of Manchukuo promoting harmony between Japanese, Chinese, and Manchu. The caption from right to left says: "With the help of Japan, China, and Manchukuo, the world can be in peace." The flags shown are, right to left: the "Five Races Under One Union" flag of China, the flag of Japan, and the flag of Manchukuo.

The concept of a unified Asia under Japanese leadership had its roots dating back to the 16th century. For example, Toyotomi Hideyoshi proposed to make China, Korea, and Japan into "one". Moreover, Hideyoshi had further plans to expand into India, the Philippines, and other islands in the Pacific.

=== Monroe Doctrine for Japan ===
In Autumn 1872, United States minister to Japan Charles DeLong explained to U.S. General Charles LeGendre that he had been urging the Government of Japan to occupy Taiwan and "civilize" the Taiwanese indigenous people just as the U.S. had taken over the land of the Native Americans and "civilized" them. General LeGendre, the first non-Japanese person hired as a foreign policy expert by the Japanese government, encouraged the Japanese to declare a Japanese "sphere of influence" modeled on the Monroe Doctrine that the U.S. had declared for the exclusion of other powers from the Western Hemisphere. Such a Japanese sphere of influence would be the first time a non-White state would adopt such a policy. The stated aim of such a sphere of influence would be to civilize the barbarian peoples of Asia. "Pacify and civilize them if possible, and if not...exterminate them or otherwise deal with them as the United States and England have dealt with the barbarians," LeGendre had explained to the Japanese. Japan began invading Taiwan in 1874 and fought the Russian Empire for control of Manchuria starting in 1904.

Continuing this American policy, U.S. President Theodore Roosevelt also secretly reiterated to Japan that, just as the U.S. through the Monroe Doctrine and its Roosevelt Corollary declared the Western Hemisphere as part of its sphere of influence, Japan should create its own sphere of influence in the Pacific Rim. Teddy Roosevelt was encouraged by Japan embarking on Western ways and developing a modern military in the wake of the forced "Opening of Japan" by the United States that had begun with the Perry Expedition. Roosevelt envisioned demarcating respective United States and Japanese zones of military and economic dominance in the Pacific Rim. Roosevelt told the Japanese that they are more racially similar to Americans than Russians are, even though Russians are a White race, and that Japan should take its place among the great Western powers to dominate, among other areas, Korea and Manchuria, but that Japan must not encroach on U.S. possession of the Philippines. In much the same way that Europeans used the "backwardness" of African and Asian nations as a reason for why they had to conquer them, for the Japanese elite the "backwardness" of China and Korea was proof of the inferiority of those nations, thus giving the Japanese the "right" to conquer them. This mutual recognition of the U.S. and the Japanese zones of control in the Pacific would be secretly articulated in the Taft–Katsura Agreement of July 1905, essentially partitioning the Western Pacific Rim between the two powers.

In an interview with the New York Times days later, Katsura explained that Japan's "policy in the Far East will be in exact accord with that of England and the United States." Japan will soon force "upon Korea and China the same benefits of modern development that have been in the past forced on us.... We intend to begin a campaign of education in [Korea and China] such as we ourselves have experienced [and to develop] Asiatic commercial interests that will benefit us all. China and Korea are both atrociously mis-governed...These conditions we will endeavor to correct at the earliest possible date--by persuasion and education, if possible; by force, if necessary. And in this, as in all things, we expect to act in exact concurrence with the ideas and desires of England and the United States."

During the proceedings of the Lansing–Ishii Agreement, Japan explained to Western observers that their expansionism in Asia was analogous to the United States' Monroe Doctrine. This conception was influential in the development of the Greater East Asia Co-Prosperity concept, with the Japanese Army also comparing it to the Roosevelt Corollary. One of the reasons why Japan adopted imperialism was to resolve domestic issues such as overpopulation and resource scarcity. Another reason was to withstand Western imperialism.

On November 3, 1938, Prime Minister Fumimaro Konoe and Minister for Foreign Affairs Hachirō Arita proposed the development of the New Order in East Asia (東亜新秩序, Tōa Shin Chitsujo), which was limited to Japan, China, and the puppet state of Manchukuo. They believed that the union had 6 purposes:

1. Permanent stability of Eastern Asia
2. Neighbourly amity and international justice
3. Joint defence against communism
4. Creation of a new culture
5. Economic cohesion and co-operation
6. World peace

The vagueness of the above points were effective in making people more agreeable to militarism and collaborationism.

On June 29, 1940, Arita renamed the union the Greater East Asia Co-Prosperity Sphere, which he announced by radio address. At Yōsuke Matsuoka's advice, Arita emphasised on the economic aspects more. On August 1, Konoe, who still used the original name, expanded the scope of the union to include the territories of Southeast Asia. On November 5, Konoe reaffirmed that a Japan–Manchukuo–China yen bloc would continue and be "perfected".

== History ==
The outbreak of World War II in Europe gave the Japanese an opportunity to fulfill the objectives of the Greater East Asia Co-Prosperity Sphere, without significant pushback from the Western powers or China. This entailed the conquest of Southeast Asian territories to extract their natural resources. If territories were unprofitable, the Japanese would encourage their subjects, including those in mainland Japan, to endure "economic suffering" and prevent outflow of material to the enemy. Nonetheless, they preached the moral superiority of cultivating a "spiritual essence" instead of prioritising material gain like Western powers.

After Japanese advancements into French Indochina in 1940, knowing that Japan was completely dependent on other countries for natural resources, U.S. President Franklin D. Roosevelt ordered a trade embargo on steel and oil, raw materials that were vital to Japan's war effort. Without steel and oil imports, Japan's military could not fight for long. As a result of the embargo, Japan decided to attack the British and Dutch colonies in Southeast Asia from 7 to 19 December 1941, seizing the raw materials needed for the war effort. These efforts were successful, with Japanese politician Nobusuke Kishi announcing via radio broadcast that vast resources were available for Japanese use in the newly conquered territories.

As part of its war drive in the Pacific, Japanese propaganda included phrases like "Asia for the Asiatics" and talked about the need to "liberate" Asian colonies from the control of Western powers. They also planned to change the Chinese hegemony in the agricultural market in Southeast Asia with Japanese immigrants to boost its economic value, with the former being despised by Southeast Asian natives. The Japanese failure to bring the ongoing Second Sino-Japanese War to a swift conclusion was blamed in part on the lack of resources; Japanese propaganda claimed this was due to the refusal by Western powers to supply Japan's military. Although invading Japanese forces sometimes received rapturous welcomes throughout recently captured Asian territories due to anti-Western and occasionally, anti-Chinese sentiment, the subsequent brutality of the Japanese military led many of the inhabitants of those regions to regard Japan as being worse than their former colonial rulers. The Japanese government directed that economies of occupied territories be managed strictly for the production of raw materials for the Japanese war effort; a cabinet member declared, "There are no restrictions. They are enemy possessions. We can take them, do anything we want". For example, according to estimates, under Japanese occupation, about 100,000 Burmese and Malay Indian labourers died while constructing the Burma-Siam Railway. The Japanese sometimes spared ethnic groups, such as Chinese immigrants, if they supported the war effort, whether sincerely or not.

An Investigation of Global Policy with the Yamato Race as Nucleus – a secret document completed in 1943 for high-ranking government use – laid out that Japan, as the originator and strongest military power within the region, would naturally take the superior position within the Greater East Asia Co-Prosperity Sphere, with the other nations under Japan's umbrella of protection. Japanese propaganda was useful in mobilizing Japanese citizens for the war effort, convincing them Japan's expansion was an act of anti-colonial liberation from Western domination. The booklet Read This and the War is Won—for the Japanese Army—presented colonialism as an oppressive group of colonists living in luxury by burdening Asians. According to Japan, since racial ties of blood connected other Asians to the Japanese, and Asians had been weakened by colonialism, it was Japan's self-appointed role to "make men of them again" and liberate them from their Western oppressors.

According to Foreign Minister Shigenori Tōgō (in office 1941–1942 and 1945), should Japan be successful in creating this sphere, it would emerge as the leader of Eastern Asia, and the Greater East Asia Co-Prosperity Sphere would be synonymous with the Japanese Empire.

=== Greater East Asia Conference ===
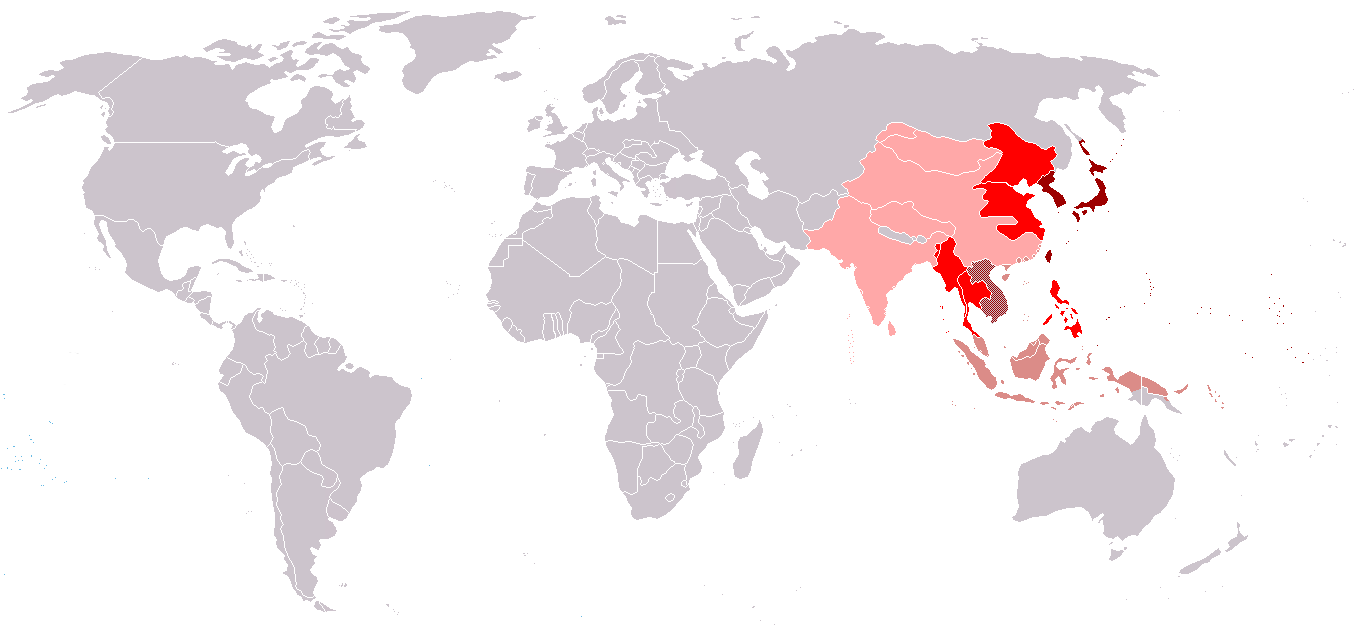
Attendees of the Greater East Asia Conference : Japan and colonies : Japanese allies and occupied territory : Territories disputed and claimed by Japan and its allies

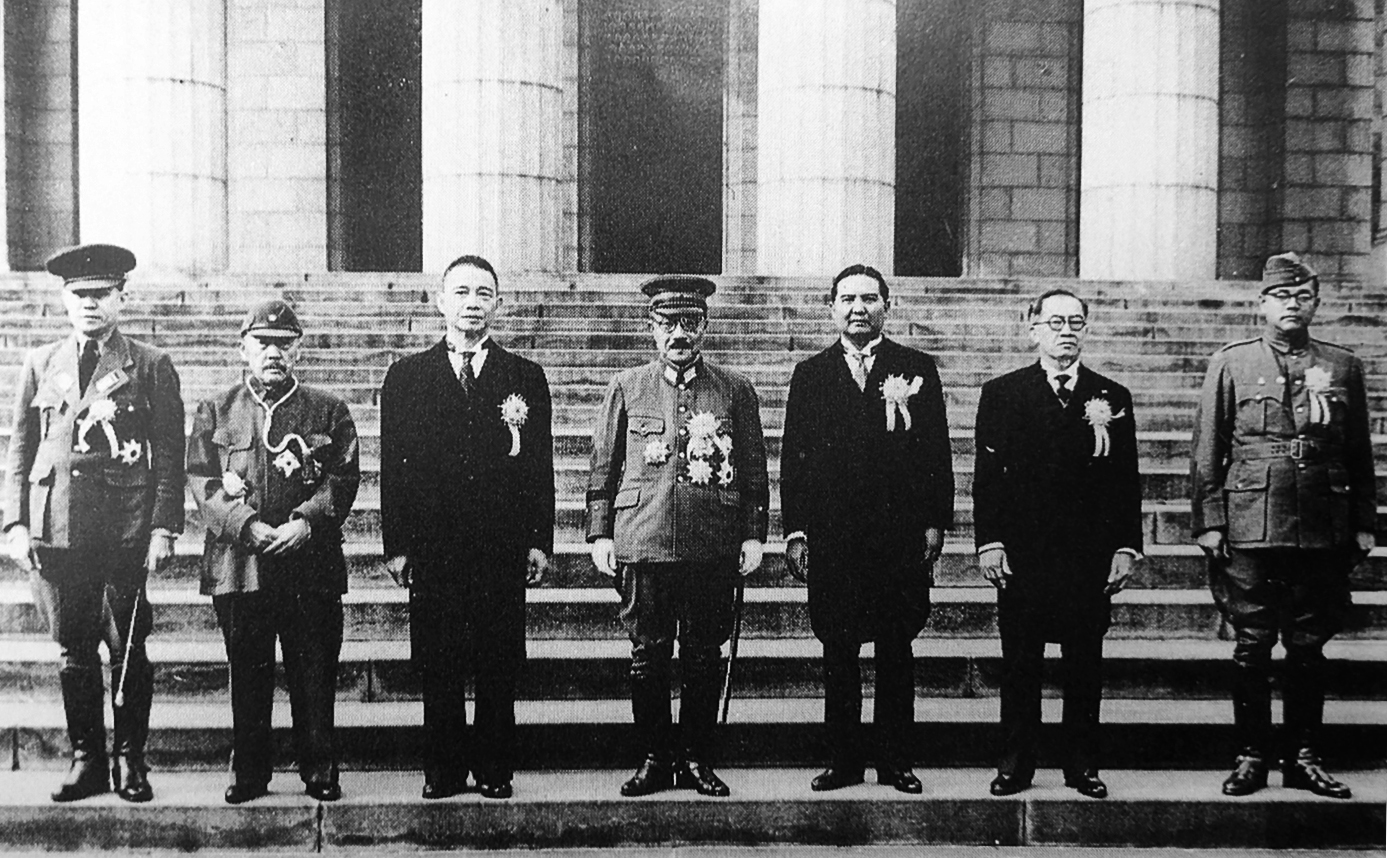
The Greater East Asia Conference in November 1943. Participants left to right: Ba Maw, Zhang Jinghui, Wang Jingwei, Hideki Tojo, Wan Waithayakon, José P. Laurel, and Subhas Chandra Bose

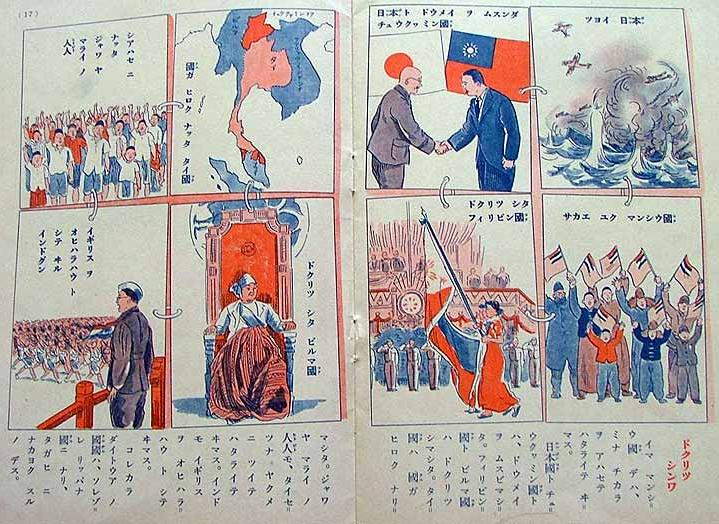
Fragment of a Japanese propaganda booklet published by the Tokyo Conference (1943), depicting scenes of situations in Greater East Asia, from the top, left to right: the Japanese occupation of Malaya, Thailand under Plaek Phibunsongkram gaining the territories of Saharat Thai Doem, the Republic of China under Wang Jingwei allied with Japan, Subhas Chandra Bose forming the Provisional Government of Free India, the State of Burma gaining independence under Ba Maw, the Declaration of the Second Philippine Republic, and people of Manchukuo

The Greater East Asia Conference (大東亞會議, Dai Tōa Kaigi) took place in Tokyo on 5–6 November 1943: Japan hosted the heads of state of various component members of the Greater East Asia Co-Prosperity Sphere. The conference was also referred to as the Tokyo Conference. The common language used by the delegates during the conference was English. The conference was mainly used as propaganda.

At the conference, Tojo greeted them with a speech praising the "spiritual essence" of Asia instead of the "materialistic civilisation" of the West. Their meeting was characterised by the praise of solidarity and condemnation of Western colonialism but without practical plans for either economic development or integration. Because of a lack of military representatives at the conference, the conference served little military value.

With the simultaneous use of Wilsonian and Pan-Asian rhetoric, the goals of the conference were to solidify the commitment of certain Asian countries to Japan's war effort and to improve Japan's world image; however, the representatives of the other attending countries were in practice neither independent nor treated as equals by Japan.

The following dignitaries attended:

- Hideki Tojo, Prime Minister of the Empire of Japan
- Zhang Jinghui, Prime Minister of Manchukuo
- Wang Jingwei, President of the Republic of China
- Ba Maw, Head of State of the State of Burma
- Subhas Chandra Bose, Head of State of the Provisional Government of Free India
- José P. Laurel, President of the Republic of the Philippines
- Prince Wan Waithayakon, envoy from the Kingdom of Thailand

=== Imperial rule ===
The ideology of the Japanese colonial empire, as it expanded dramatically during the war, contained two contradictory impulses. On the one hand, it preached the unity of the Greater East Asia Co-Prosperity Sphere, a coalition of Asian races directed by Japan against Western imperialism in Asia. This approach celebrated the spiritual values of the East in opposition to the "crass materialism" of the West. In practice, however, the Japanese installed organisationally-minded bureaucrats and engineers to run their new empire, and they believed in ideals of efficiency, modernisation, and engineering solutions to social problems. Japanese was the official language of the bureaucracy in all of the areas and was taught at schools as a national language.

Japan set up puppet regimes in Manchuria and China; they vanished at the war's end. The Imperial Army operated ruthless administrations in most conquered areas but paid more favourable attention to the Dutch East Indies. The main goal was to obtain oil but the Dutch colonial government destroyed the oil wells. However, the Japanese could repair and reopen them within a few months of their conquest. However, most tankers transporting oil to Japan were sunk by U.S. Navy submarines, so Japan's oil shortage became increasingly acute. Japan also sponsored an Indonesian nationalist movement under Sukarno. Sukarno finally came to power in the late 1940s after several years of fighting the Dutch.

=== Philippines ===
To build up the economic base of the Co-Prosperity Sphere, the Japanese Army envisioned using the Philippine islands as a source of agricultural products needed by its industry. For example, Japan had a surplus of sugar from Taiwan, and a severe shortage of cotton, so they tried to grow cotton on sugar lands with disastrous results; they lacked the seeds, pesticides, and technical skills to grow cotton. Jobless farm workers flocked to the cities, where there was minimal relief and few jobs. The Japanese Army also tried using cane sugar for fuel, castor beans and copra for oil, Derris for quinine, cotton for uniforms, and abacá for rope. The plans were difficult to implement due to limited skills, collapsed international markets, bad weather, and transportation shortages. The program failed, giving very little help to Japanese industry and diverting resources needed for food production. As Stanley Karnow writes, Filipinos "rapidly learned as well that 'co-prosperity' meant servitude to Japan's economic requirements". A Taglish joke said it should be named prosperity-ko, as ko is a pronoun meaning "mine".

Living conditions were poor throughout the Philippines during the war. Transportation between the islands was difficult because of a lack of fuel. Food was in short supply, with sporadic famines and epidemic diseases that killed hundreds of thousands of people. In October 1943, Japan declared the Philippines an independent republic. The Japanese-sponsored Second Philippine Republic, headed by President José P. Laurel, proved to be ineffective and unpopular as Japan maintained very tight control.

=== Failure ===
The Co-Prosperity Sphere collapsed with Japan's surrender to the Allies in September 1945. Ba Maw, wartime President of Burma under the Japanese, blamed the Japanese military for the failure of the Co-Prosperity Sphere:

The militarists saw everything only from a Japanese perspective and, even worse, they insisted that all others dealing with them should do the same. For them, there was only one way to do a thing, the Japanese way; only one goal and interest, the Japanese interest; only one destiny for the East Asian countries, to become so many Manchukuos or Koreas tied forever to Japan. This racial impositions ... made any real understanding between the Japanese militarists and the people of our region virtually impossible.

In other words, the Greater East Asia Co-Prosperity Sphere operated not for the betterment of all the Asian countries but for Japan's interests, and thus the Japanese failed to gather support in other Asian countries. Nationalist movements did appear in these Asian countries during this period, and these nationalists cooperated with the Japanese to some extent. However, Willard Elsbree, professor emeritus of political science at Ohio University, claims that the Japanese government and these nationalist leaders never developed "a real unity of interests between the two parties, [and] there was no overwhelming despair on the part of the Asians at Japan's defeat".

The Greater East Asia Co-Prosperity Sphere at its greatest extent

The failure of Japan to understand the goals and interests of the other countries involved in the Greater East Asia Co-Prosperity Sphere led to a weak association of countries bound to Japan only in theory and not in spirit. Ba Maw argued that Japan should've acted according to the declared aims of "Asia for the Asiatics". He claimed that if Japan had proclaimed this maxim at the beginning of the war and acted on that idea, they could have engineered a very different outcome.

No military defeat could then have robbed her of the trust and gratitude of half of Asia or even more, and that would have mattered a great deal in finding for her a new, great, and abiding place in a postwar world in which Asia was coming into her own.

== Propaganda efforts ==
Pamphlets were dropped by airplane on the Philippines, Malaya, North Borneo, Sarawak, Singapore, and Indonesia, urging them to join the movement. Mutual cultural societies were founded in all conquered lands to ingratiate with the natives and try to supplant English with Japanese as the commonly used language. Multi-lingual pamphlets depicted many Asians marching or working together in happy unity, with the flags of all the states and a map depicting the intended sphere. Others proclaimed that they had given independent governments to the countries they occupied, a claim undermined by the lack of power given to these puppet governments.

In Thailand, a street was built to demonstrate it, to be filled with modern buildings and shops, but 9/10 of it consisted of false fronts. A network of Japanese-sponsored film production, distribution, and exhibition companies extended across the Japanese Empire and was collectively referred to as the Greater East Asian Film Sphere. These film centers mass-produced shorts, newsreels, and feature films to encourage Japanese language acquisition as well as cooperation with Japanese colonial authorities.

== Projected territorial extent ==
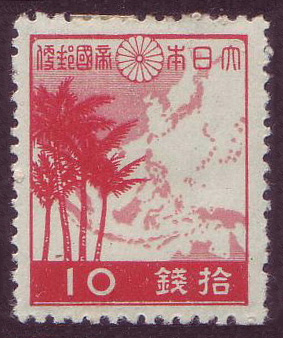
A Japanese 10 sen stamp from 1942 depicting the approximate extension of the Greater East Asia Co-Prosperity Sphere

Prior to the escalation of World War II to the Pacific and East Asia, Japanese planners regarded it as self-evident that the conquests secured in Japan's earlier wars with Russia (South Sakhalin and Kwantung), Germany (South Seas Mandate), and China (Manchuria) would be retained, as well as Korea (Chōsen), Taiwan (Formosa), the recently seized additional portions of China, and occupied French Indochina.

=== Land Disposal Plan ===
A reasonably accurate indication as to the geographic dimensions of the Co-Prosperity Sphere are elaborated on in a Japanese wartime document prepared in December 1941 by the Research Department of the Ministry of War. Known as the "Land Disposal Plan in the Greater East Asia Co-Prosperity Sphere" (大東亜共栄圏における土地処分案) it was put together with the consent of and according to the directions of the Minister of War (later Prime Minister) Hideki Tōjō. It assumed that the already established puppet governments of Manchukuo, Mengjiang, and the Wang Jingwei regime in Japanese-occupied China would continue to function in these areas. Beyond these contemporary parts of Japan's sphere of influence it also envisaged the conquest of a vast range of territories covering virtually all of East Asia, the Pacific Ocean, and even sizable portions of the Western Hemisphere, including in locations as far removed from Japan as South America and the eastern Caribbean.

Although the projected extension of the Co-Prosperity Sphere was extremely ambitious, the Japanese goal during the "Greater East Asia War" was not to acquire all the territory designated in the plan at once, but to prepare for a future decisive war some 20 years later by conquering the Asian colonies of the defeated European powers, as well as the Philippines from the United States. When Tōjō spoke on the plan to the House of Peers he was vague about the long-term prospects, but insinuated that the Philippines and Burma might be allowed independence, although vital territories such as Hong Kong would remain under Japanese rule.

The Micronesian islands that had been seized from Germany in World War I and which were assigned to Japan as C-Class Mandates, namely the Marianas, Carolines, Marshall Islands, and several others do not figure in this project. They were the subject of earlier negotiations with the Germans and were expected to be officially ceded to Japan in return for economic and monetary compensations.

The plan divided Japan's future empire into two different groups. The first group of territories were expected to become either part of Japan or otherwise be under its direct administration. Second were those territories that would fall under the control of a number of tightly controlled pro-Japanese vassal states based on the model of Manchukuo, as nominally "independent" members of the Greater East Asian alliance.

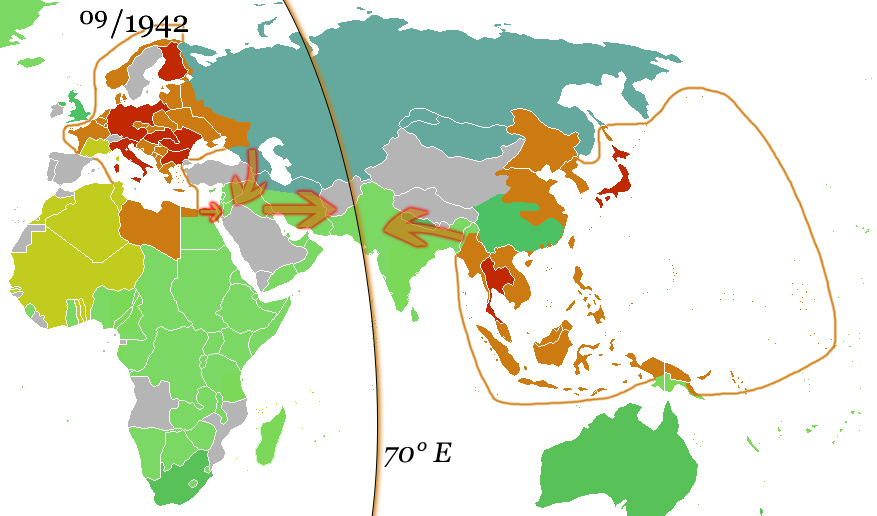
German and Japanese direct spheres of influence at their greatest extents in fall 1942. Arrows show planned movements to the proposed demarcation line at 70° E, which was, however, never even approximated.

Parts of the plan depended on successful negotiations with Nazi Germany and a global victory by the Axis powers. After Germany and Italy declared war on the United States on 11 December 1941, Japan presented the Germans with a drafted military convention that would specifically delimit the Asian continent by a dividing line along the 70th meridian east longitude. This line, running southwards through the Ob River's Arctic estuary, southwards to just east of Khost in Afghanistan and heading into the Indian Ocean just west of Rajkot in India, would have split Germany's Lebensraum and Italy's spazio vitale territories to the west of it, and Japan's Greater East Asia Co-Prosperity Sphere and its other areas to the east of it. The plan of the Third Reich for fortifying its own Lebensraum territory's eastern limits, beyond which the Co-Prosperity Sphere's northwestern frontier areas would exist in East Asia, involved the creation of a "living wall" of Wehrbauer "soldier-peasant" communities defending it. However, it is unknown if the Axis powers ever formally negotiated a possible, complementary second demarcation line that would have divided the Western Hemisphere.

==== Japanese-governed ====
- Government-General of Formosa

Hong Kong, the Philippines, Portuguese Macau (to be purchased from Portugal or taken by force), the Paracel Islands, and Hainan Island (to be purchased from the Chinese puppet regime). Contrary to its name it was not intended to include the island of Formosa (Taiwan)

- South Seas Government Office

Guam, Nauru, Ocean Island, the Gilbert Islands, and Wake Island

- Melanesian Region Government-General or South Pacific Government-General

Australian Papua, Australian New Guinea, the Solomon Islands, the Ellice Islands, Fiji, the New Hebrides, New Caledonia, the Loyalty Islands, and the Chesterfield Islands

- Eastern Pacific Government-General

Hawaii Territory, Howland Island, Baker Island, the Phoenix Islands, the Marquesas and Tuamotu Islands, the Society Islands, the Cook and Austral Islands, all of the Samoan Islands, and Tonga. The possibility of re-establishing the defunct Kingdom of Hawaii was also considered, based on the model of Manchukuo. Those favouring annexation of Hawaii (on the model of Karafuto) intended to use the local Japanese community, which had constituted 43% (c. 160,000) of Hawaii's population in the 1920s, as a leverage. Hawaii was to become self-sufficient in food production, while the Big Five corporations of sugar and pineapple processing were to be broken up. No decision was ever reached regarding whether Hawaii would be annexed to Japan, become a puppet state, or be used as a bargaining chip for leverage against the U.S.

- Australian Government-General

All of Australia including Tasmania. Australia and New Zealand were to accommodate up to two million Japanese settlers. However, there are indications that the Japanese were also looking for a separate peace with Australia, and a satellite state rather than colony status similar to that of Burma and the Philippines.

- New Zealand Government-General

The New Zealand North and South Islands, Macquarie Island, as well as the rest of the Southwest Pacific

- Ceylon Government-General

Ceylon and all of India below a line running approximately from Portuguese Goa to the coastline of the Bay of Bengal

- Alaska Government-General

The Alaska Territory, the Yukon Territory, the western portion of the Northwest Territories, Alberta, British Columbia, and Washington. There were also plans to make the American West Coast (comprising California and Oregon) a semi-autonomous satellite state. This latter plan was not seriously considered as it depended upon a global victory of Axis forces.

- Government-General of Central America

Guatemala, El Salvador, Honduras, British Honduras, Nicaragua, Costa Rica, Panama, Colombia, the Maracaibo (western) portion of Venezuela, Ecuador, Cuba, Haiti, the Dominican Republic, Jamaica, and The Bahamas. In addition, if either Mexico, Peru, or Chile were to enter the war against Japan, substantial parts of these states would also be ceded to Japan. Events that transpired between May 22, 1942, when Mexico declared war on the Axis, through Peru's declaration of war on February 12, 1944, and concluding with Chile only declaring war on Japan by April 11, 1945 (as Nazi Germany was nearly defeated at that time), brought all three of these southeast Pacific Rim nations of the Western Hemisphere's Pacific coast into conflict with Japan by the war's end. The future of Trinidad, British and Dutch Guiana, and the British and French possessions in the Leeward Islands at the hands of Imperial Japan were meant to be left open for negotiations with Nazi Germany had the Axis forces been victorious.

==== Asian puppet states ====
- East Indies Kingdom (Indonesia)

Dutch East Indies, British Borneo, Christmas Islands, Cocos Islands, Andaman Islands, Nicobar Islands, and Portuguese Timor (to be purchased from Portugal)

- Kingdom of Burma

Burma proper, Assam (a province of the British Raj), and a large part of Bengal.

- Kingdom of Malaya

British Malaya (excluding the Cocos and Christmas Islands)

- Kingdom of Annam (Vietnam)

Annam, Laos, and Tonkin

- Kingdom of Cambodia

Cambodia and French Cochinchina

Puppet states which already existed when the Land Disposal Plan has been drafted, were:

- Manchukuo

Chinese Manchuria

- Republic of China

Other parts of China occupied by Japan

- Mengjiang

Inner Mongolia territories west of Manchuria, since 1940 officially a part of the Republic of China. It was meant as a starting point for a regime which would cover all of Mongolia.

Contrary to the plan Japan installed a puppet state on the Philippines instead of exerting direct control. In the former French Indochina, the Empire of Vietnam, the Kingdom of Kampuchea, and the Kingdom of Luang Prabang were founded. Vietnam attempted to work for independence and made progressive reforms. The State of Burma did not become a kingdom.

== Political parties and movements with Japanese support ==
- Azad Hind (Indian nationalist movement in South Asia)
- Indian Independence League (Indian nationalist movement in Southeast Asia)
- Indonesian National Party (Indonesian nationalist movement)
- Kapisanan ng Paglilingkod sa Bagong Pilipinas (Philippine nationalist ruling party of the Second Philippine Republic)
- Kesatuan Melayu Muda (Malayan nationalist movement)
- Freedom Bloc (Dobama-Sinyetha Asiayone) (Burmese nationalist association)
- Đại Việt National Socialist Party (Vietnamese nationalist movement)
- Concordia Association of Manchukuo (Manchurian nationalist movement)

== See also ==
=== Administration ===
- Collaboration with the Empire of Japan
- East Asia Development Board
- Imperial Rule Assistance Association
- List of East Asian leaders in the Japanese sphere of influence (1931–1945)
- Ministry of Greater East Asia

=== People ===
- Hachirō Arita: an army thinker who thought up the Greater East Asian concept
- Ikki Kita: a Japanese nationalist who developed a similar pan-Asian concept
- Satō Nobuhiro: the alleged developer of the Greater East Asia concept

=== Related topics ===
- Flying geese paradigm
- Japanese war crimes
- Kantokuen
- Political extremism in Japan
- Tanaka Memorial (Tanaka Jōsōbun) – an alleged Japanese strategic planning document from 1927 in which Prime Minister Baron Tanaka Giichi, who laid out a strategy to take over the world for Emperor Hirohito

==== Others ====
- Balkan Federation
- Civilizing mission
- Eurasianism
- Greater Germanic Reich
- Greater Serbia
- Latin Bloc (proposed alliance)
- Międzymorze
- Monroe Doctrine
- New Order (Nazism)
- Pan-Slavism
- Russkiy mir
- Scramble for Africa
- Tianxia – Chinese cultural, philosophical, and political concept
- White man's burden
