= Ural Mountains in Nazi planning =

Strategic objectives of Third Reich for Urals region

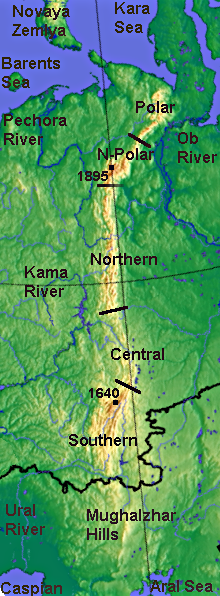
Map of the Ural mountains

The Ural Mountains played a prominent role in Nazi planning. Adolf Hitler and the rest of the Nazi leadership made many references to them as a strategic objective of the Third Reich to follow a decisive victory on the Eastern Front against the Soviet Union.

== As a geographic concept ==
In 1725, Philip Johan von Strahlenberg first used the Ural Mountains as part of the eastern demarcation of Europe. Since c. 1850 most cartographers have regarded the Urals and the Ural River to the south of them as the eastern boundary of Europe, geographically recognised as a subcontinent of Eurasia.

The Nazis rejected the notion that these mountains demarcated the border of Europe, at least in a cultural if not in a geographic sense. Nazi propaganda and Nazi leaders repeatedly labelled the Soviet Union as an "Asiatic state" and equated the Russians both with the Huns and with the Mongols. German media portrayed the German campaigns in the east as necessary to ensure the survival of European culture against the "Asian menace". In a major conference on 16 July 1941, where chief aspects of German rule in the occupied territories of Eastern Europe were laid out, Hitler emphasised to the attendees (Martin Bormann, Hermann Göring, Alfred Rosenberg, and Hans Lammers) that "the Europe of today was nothing but a geographical term; in reality Asia extended up to our frontiers".

Hitler also expressed his belief that in ancient times the concept of "Europe" was limited to the southern tip of the Greek peninsula, and was then "brought into confusion" by the expanding borders of the Roman Empire. He stated that if Germany won the war, the boundary of Europe "would extend eastward to the furthest German colony".

In an attempt to influence Nazi policy, Norwegian fascist politician Vidkun Quisling produced a memorandum for the Germans – "Aide-mémoire on the Russian Question" (Denkschrift über die russische Frage) – which expressed his own ideas on the "Russian question", which he described as "the main problem in world politics today". He advocated the Dnieper as a general division-line between Western Europe ("Germania") and Russia. This would necessitate the division of Ukraine, but he argued that this "could be defended from geographical and historical perspectives".

== Plans for a border ==
Albert Speer recounted a 1941 episode in his post-war memoirs wherein he observed Hitler's early ruminations about the Urals. Soviet Foreign Minister, Vyacheslav Molotov, travelled to Berlin in mid-November 1940 to discuss German–Soviet relations with Hitler and German Foreign Minister Joachim von Ribbentrop. By then, Hitler had made up his mind that he would attack the Soviet Union the following spring, having already issued orders for a military plan which would later become Operation Barbarossa. A few months later, an army adjutant pointed out to Speer an ordinary pencil line which Hitler had drawn on his globe at the Berghof, running north–south along the Ural mountains, signifying the future boundary of Germany's sphere of influence with that of Japan.

Hitler also mentioned the Urals in his recorded table talks several times; on one occasion he recounts how others questioned him if they were a sufficiently eastward boundary for the Germans to advance to. He confirmed this objective, but emphasised that the primary goal was to "eradicate Bolshevism", and that, if necessary, further military campaigns would be carried out to ensure this. He later stated that Joseph Stalin would be prepared to lose European Russia if he did not succeed at "solving its problems" and thereby "risked losing everything". He expressed his belief that it would be impossible for Stalin to retake Europe from Siberia, comparing it to himself hypothetically retaking Germany if he were driven back to Slovakia, and that the German invasion of the Soviet Union which was then under way would "bring about the downfall of the Soviet Empire". In a discussion with Danish Foreign Minister Erik Scavenius on 2 November 1942, Ribbentrop stated that the Germans expected Asian Russia to eventually split up into several harmless "peasant republics" after Germany had occupied the country's European parts.

On 16 September 1941, Hitler mentioned to Otto Abetz, the German ambassador in Paris, that "the new Russia as far as the Urals" would become Germany's India, but that due to its geographic proximity to Germany was far more favorably located for the Germans than India was for Britain.

In the above-mentioned conference of 16 July 1941, it was codified as policy that in order to "secure the safety of the [Third] Reich" no non-German military power would ever again be allowed west of the Urals (including non-Russian native militias), even if it meant war for the next hundred years. Hitler's future successors were to be instructed of this, if necessary. This was to be done to prevent any western powers hostile to Germany from conspiring against it with its eastern neighbors in the future, as the French had supposedly done with the Turks, and which the British were alleged to be doing with the Soviets. No organised Russian state would also be allowed to exist west of this line, which Hitler clarified as actually meaning a line 200–300 km east of the mountains, approaching the 70° east longitude line the Japanese had proposed as the westernmost limit of their own influence.

SS leader Heinrich Himmler went into some detail about how he envisaged the mountains during the 1943 Posen speeches. He stated that the "Germanic race" would have to gradually expand to this border so that after several generations this "master race", as the leader of Europe, would again be ready to "resume the battles of destiny against Asia", which were "sure to break out again". He stated that Europe's defeat would mean "the destruction of the creative power of the earth".

The Urals were noted as a distant objective of Generalplan Ost, the overall Nazi colonisation scheme of Eastern Europe.

=== "Living wall" ===
Hitler later rejected the mountains as an adequate border, calling it absurd that "these middle-sized mountains" represented the boundary between the "European and Asiatic worlds", stating that one might as well accord that title to one of the large Russian rivers. He explained that only a "living [racial] wall" of Aryan fighters would do as a frontier, and that keeping a permanent state of war present in the east was necessary to "preserve the vitality of the race".

The real frontier is the one that separates the Germanic world from the Slav world. It is our duty to place it where we want it to be. If anyone asks where we obtain the right to extend the Germanic space to the east, we reply that, for a nation, its awareness of what it represents carries this right with. It is success that justifies everything. The reply to such questions can only be of an empirical nature. It is inconceivable that a higher people should painfully exist on a soil too narrow for it, while amorphous masses, which contribute nothing to civilisation, occupy infinite tracts of a soil that is one of the richest in the world... We must create conditions for our people that favour its multiplication, and we must at the same time build a dike against the Russian flood [...] Since there is no natural protection against such a flood, we must meet it with a living wall. A permanent war on the eastern front will help form a sound race of men, and will prevent us from relapsing into the softness of a Europe thrown back upon itself. It should be possible for us to control this region to the east with two hundred and fifty thousand men plus a cadre of good administrators... This space in Russia must always be dominated by Germans.

— Adolf Hitler

The theme of a "living wall" was used by Hitler as early as Mein Kampf (published 1925–1926). In it he presented the future German state under National Socialist rule as a "father's house" (Vaterhaus), a safe place which would keep in the "right human elements", and keep out those which were undesirable. This metaphorical building was to have solid and supportive foundations (Fundamente) and walls (Mauern), and could only be protected by a living wall (lebendige Mauer) of patriotic and fanatically devoted German people.

The idea became more prominent in Hitler's mind as the war went on. On 10 December 1942 (as the Battle of Stalingrad was turning unfavourably against the Germans), he told Anton Mussert, a Dutch Nazi collaborator, that the "Asiatic waves were threatening to overrun Europe and exterminate the higher races", and that this threat could only be countered by wall-building and long-term fighting. On 20 April 1943 (Hitler's birthday), he had a discussion with Speer and Karl-Otto Saur on a design he had personally drawn for a six-person bunker that was to be used in the Atlantic Wall, featuring machine guns, an anti-tank gun, and flamethrowers. He indicated that this design was also to be used for defence purposes at Germany's "ultimate eastern border deep within Russia" — if the Axis had completely defeated the Soviets, there might have existed the possibility of any remnant Soviet forces or Japanese forces from the northwesterly mainland Siberian-located extremities of Imperial Japan's Co-Prosperity Sphere attempting to cross such a frontier westwards.

== Related plans ==
Various German agencies assumed a number of different boundaries in the east.

The administrative planning carried out by Alfred Rosenberg from April to June 1941 in his capacity as Plenipotentiary for the Central Treatment of Questions of the Eastern European Space (basis of the future Reich Ministry for the Occupied Eastern Territories) for the territories that were to be conquered in the Soviet Union based the envisaged civil districts of the Reichskommissariate to a large extent on the borders of the pre-existing Soviet oblasts and autonomous republics, particularly in Reichskommissariat Moskowien. This included even territory to the east of the mountains, such as the Sverdlovsk (Yekaterinburg) region.

The Wehrmacht assumed an eastern boundary at the A–A line (a limit along the Volga river between the cities of Archangelsk and Astrakhan), which was the military objective of Operation Barbarossa.

In a later treaty with Japan, the Japanese proposed allocating all of Afro-Eurasia west of the 70th meridian east to the Germans and Italians in the case of a total Soviet collapse, but after negotiations the boundary was changed to the Yenisey River (roughly 90 east) before the original proposal was approved by Hitler.

== See also ==
- A–A line
- Axis power negotiations on the division of Asia
- Greater East Asia Co-Prosperity Sphere
- Lebensraum
- Panther–Wotan Line
- Ural bomber, a mid-to-late 1930s design competition for a Luftwaffe strategic bomber with the Urals as its maximum range
