= Lebensraum =

1890s–1940s German expansionist concept

Proposed boundaries of the "Greater Germanic Reich" (including possible satellites and protectorates), according to the Institute of Contemporary History in Munich: Greater Germanic Reich Satellite states States dependent upon the Reich

Lebensraum (German pronunciation: [ˈleːbənsˌʁaʊm], lit. 'living space') is a German concept of expansionism and Völkisch nationalism, the philosophy and policies of which were common to German politics from the 1890s to the 1940s. First popularized around 1901, Lebensraum became a geopolitical goal of the German Empire in World War I (1914–1918), as the core element of the Septemberprogramm of territorial expansion. The most extreme form of this ideology was promoted and initiated by the Nazi Party, that had ruled Nazi Germany, whose ultimate goal of which was to establish a Greater German Reich. Lebensraum was a leading motivation of Nazi Germany to initiate World War II, and it would continue this policy until the end of the conflict.

Following Adolf Hitler's rise to power, Lebensraum became an ideological principle of Nazism and provided justification for the German territorial expansion into Central and Eastern Europe. The Nazi policy Generalplan Ost (lit. 'Master Plan for the East') was based on its tenets. It stipulated that Germany required a Lebensraum necessary for its survival and that most of the populations of Central and Eastern Europe would have to be removed permanently (either through mass deportation to Siberia, extermination, or enslavement), including Polish, Ukrainian, Russian, Belarusian, Czech, and other Slavic nations considered non-Aryan. The Nazi government aimed at repopulating these lands with Germanic colonists in the name of Lebensraum during and following World War II. Entire populations were ravaged by starvation; any agricultural surplus was used to feed Germany. The Jewish population was to be exterminated outright.

Hitler's strategic program for Greater Germany was based on the belief in the power of Lebensraum, especially when pursued by a racially superior society. People deemed to be part of non-Aryan races, within the territory of Lebensraum expansion, were subjected to expulsion or destruction. The eugenics of Lebensraum assumed it to be the right of the German Aryan master race (Herrenvolk) to remove the indigenous people in the name of their own living space. They took inspiration for this concept from outside Germany, particularly the European colonization of North America. Hitler and Nazi officials took a particular interest in manifest destiny, and attempted to replicate it in occupied Europe. Nazi Germany also supported other Axis powers' expansionist ideologies such as Fascist Italy's spazio vitale and the Empire of Japan's hakkō ichiu.

== Origins ==
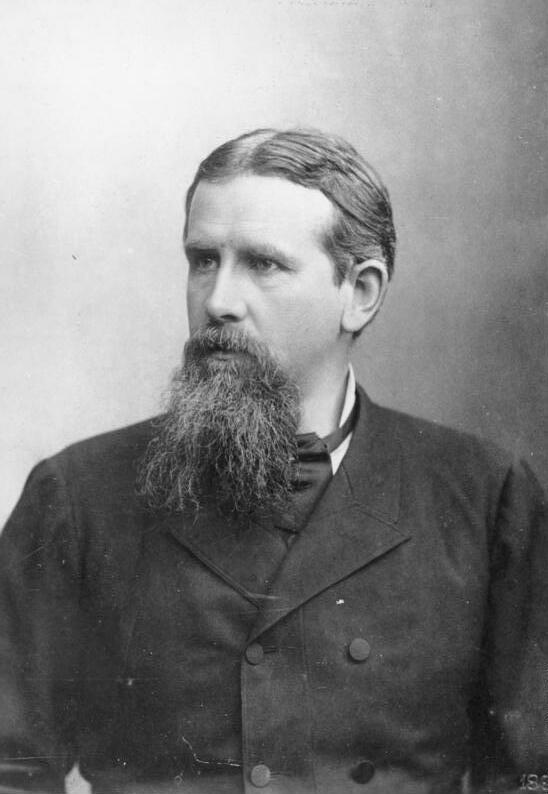
The German geographer and ethnographer Friedrich Ratzel (1844–1904) coined the word Lebensraum (1901) as a term of human geography, which the Nazis adopted as a by-word for the aggressive territorial expansion of Germany into the Greater Germanic Reich.

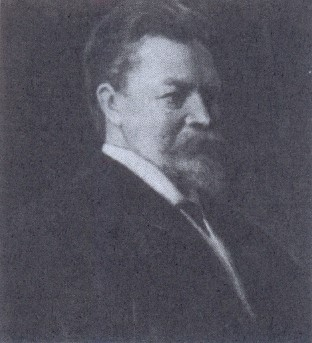
The Swedish political scientist Johan Rudolf Kjellén (1864–1922) interpreted Friedrich Ratzel's ethnogeographic term, Lebensraum, as a geopolitical term, which the Nazis applied to justify German warfare.

In the 19th century, the term Lebensraum was used by the German geographer and biologist Oscar Peschel in his 1860 review of Charles Darwin's Origins of Species (1859), which had recently been published in Germany. In this context, Peschel employed the term to describe the specific natural region or habitat in which a particular species—or, by extension, a people—emerged and developed. In 1897, the geographer and ethnographer Friedrich Ratzel in his book Politische Geographie applied the word Lebensraum ("living space") to describe physical geography as a factor that influences human activities in developing into a society. In 1901, Ratzel extended his thesis in his essay titled Lebensraum: A Biogeographical Study. Ratzel wrote at a time when the overseas space for colonial expansion almost ended, leaving few sovereign void, a situation which was emphasized by contemporary observers, and later referred to as "global closure" by Michael Heffernan. The latter concept is reflected in the main point of the work:

Everything that wants space on our planet earth must draw on the finite amount of 506 million square kilometres of its surface. This number, therefore, represents the first spatial factor where the history of life is concerned, and it also represents the last. It determines all other factors; it is the yardstick for all other factors; it encompasses the absolute limits of all physical life... There is a tension between the movement of life, which never rests, and the space on earth, which does not change. It is from this tension that the struggle for space is born... The struggle for life... primarily means nothing more than a struggle for space.

The same, Ratzel continued, applies to "the struggle of nations that we call battles" and "in a narrow space the struggle becomes desperate." Ratzel pointed to historical precedent of drang nach osten in the Middle Ages, when the social and economic pressures of rapid population growth in the German states had led to a steady colonization of Germanic peoples in Eastern Europe.

Between 1886 and 1914, Lebensraum became increasingly used as a justification for the German colonization of Africa, and was an influential factor in the causing of the Herero and Nama genocide in German South West Africa, from 1904 to 1908.

During the First World War, the Allied naval blockade of the Central Powers caused food shortages in Germany, and resources from German colonies in Africa were unable to slip past the blockade; this caused support to rise during the war for a Lebensraum that would expand Germany eastward into Russia to gain control of their resources to prevent such a situation from occurring in the future. In the period between the First and Second World Wars, German nationalists adopted the term Lebensraum in their political demands for the re-establishment of the German colonial empire, which had been dismembered by the Allies at Versailles. Ratzel said that the development of a people into a society was primarily influenced by their geographic situation (habitat) and that a society that successfully adapted to one geographic territory would naturally and logically expand the boundaries of their nation into another territory. Yet, to resolve German overpopulation, Ratzel pointed out that Imperial Germany (1871–1918) required overseas colonies to which surplus Germans ought to emigrate.

=== Geopolitics ===
Friedrich Ratzel's metaphoric concept of society as an organism—which grows and shrinks in logical relation to its Lebensraum (habitat)—proved especially influential upon the Swedish political scientist and conservative politician Johan Rudolf Kjellén (1864–1922), who interpreted that biological metaphor as a geopolitical natural-law. In the political monograph Schweden (1917; Sweden), Kjellén coined the terms geopolitik (the conditions and problems of a state that arise from its geographic territory), œcopolitik (the economic factors that affect the power of the state), and demopolitik (the social problems that arise from the racial composition of the state) to explain the political particulars to be considered for the successful administration and governing of a state. Moreover, he had a great intellectual influence upon the politics of Imperial Germany, especially with Staten som livsform (1916; The State as a Life-form), an earlier political-science book read by the society of Imperial Germany, for whom the concept of geopolitik acquired an ideological definition unlike the original, human-geography definition.

Kjellén's geopolitical interpretation of the Lebensraum concept was adopted, expanded, and adapted to the politics of Germany by publicists of imperialism such as the militarist General Friedrich von Bernhardi (1849–1930) and the political geographer and proponent of geopolitics Karl Haushofer (1869–1946). In Deutschland und der Nächste Krieg (1911; Germany and the Next War), General von Bernhardi developed Friedrich Ratzel's Lebensraum concept as a racial struggle for living space, explicitly identified Eastern Europe as the source of a new, national habitat for the German people, and said that the next war would be expressly for acquiring Lebensraum—all in fulfillment of the "biological necessity" to protect German racial supremacy. Vanquishing the Slavic and the Latin races was deemed necessary because "without war, inferior or decaying races would easily choke the growth of healthy, budding elements" of the German race—thus, the war for Lebensraum was a necessary means of defending Germany against cultural stagnation and the racial degeneracy of miscegenation.

=== Racial ideology ===
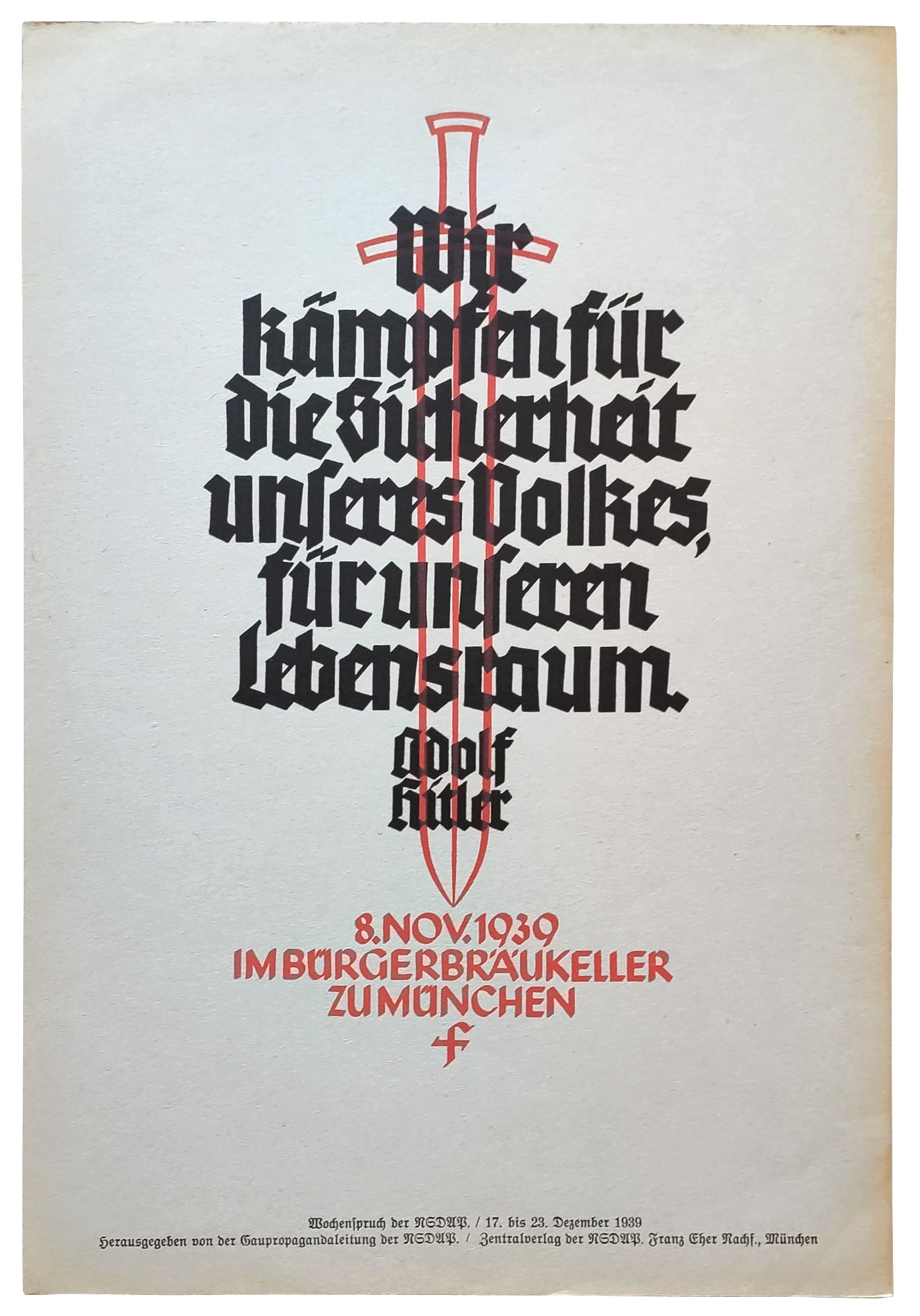
Poster from the Wochenspruch der NSDAP series, 17 December 1939. Hitler's quote reads: "We are fighting for the security of our people and for our living space."

In the national politics of Weimar Germany, the geopolitical usage of Lebensraum is credited to Karl Ernst Haushofer and his Institute of Geopolitics, in Munich, especially the ultra-nationalist interpretation of it, which was used as a justification for the desire to avenge Germany's military defeat at the end of the First World War (1914–18) and the desire to reverse the dictates of the Treaty of Versailles (1919), which reduced Germany geographically, economically, and militarily. Hitler said that the Nazi geopolitics of "inevitable expansion" would reverse overpopulation, provide natural resources, and uphold German national honor. In Mein Kampf (1925; My Struggle), Hitler presented his conception of Lebensraum as the philosophic basis for the Greater Germanic Reich that was destined to colonize Eastern Europe—especially Ukraine in the Soviet Union—and so resolve the problems of overpopulation, and that the European states had to accede to his geopolitical demands.

The Nazi Party's usages of the term Lebensraum were explicitly racial, to justify the mystical right of the racially superior Germanic peoples (Herrenvolk) to fulfill their cultural destiny at the expense of racially inferior peoples (Untermenschen), such as the Slavs of Poland, Russia, Ukraine, and the other non–Germanic peoples of "the East". Based upon Johan Rudolf Kjellén's geopolitical interpretation of Friedrich Ratzel's human-geography term, the Nazi regime (1933–45) established Lebensraum as the racist rationale of the foreign policy by which they began the Second World War, on 1 September 1939, in an effort to realise the Greater Germanic Reich at the expense of the societies of Eastern Europe.

=== Prussian policy ===
Some Prussian politicians were increasingly thinking in terms of Lebensraum by 1907. In 1902, the Prussian government had already allocated 200,000,000 ℳ︁ for purposes of German colonization of Polish portions of eastern Prussia. These funds were intended to support the creation of settlements by acquiring Polish estates. By 1907, Prussian Chancellor Bülow was promoting bills that explicitly called for the forced sale of Polish estates. A bill in late 1907 asked for another $100,000,000 for expropriations.

In 1903, the Prussian authorities tried a Polish countess for "presenting a false heir" for an estate near Wróblewo. The case, tried in Berlin, generated crowds of people and police. Observers expressed concern that Prussian "race partiality" would result in a guilty verdict.

== First World War nationalist premise ==
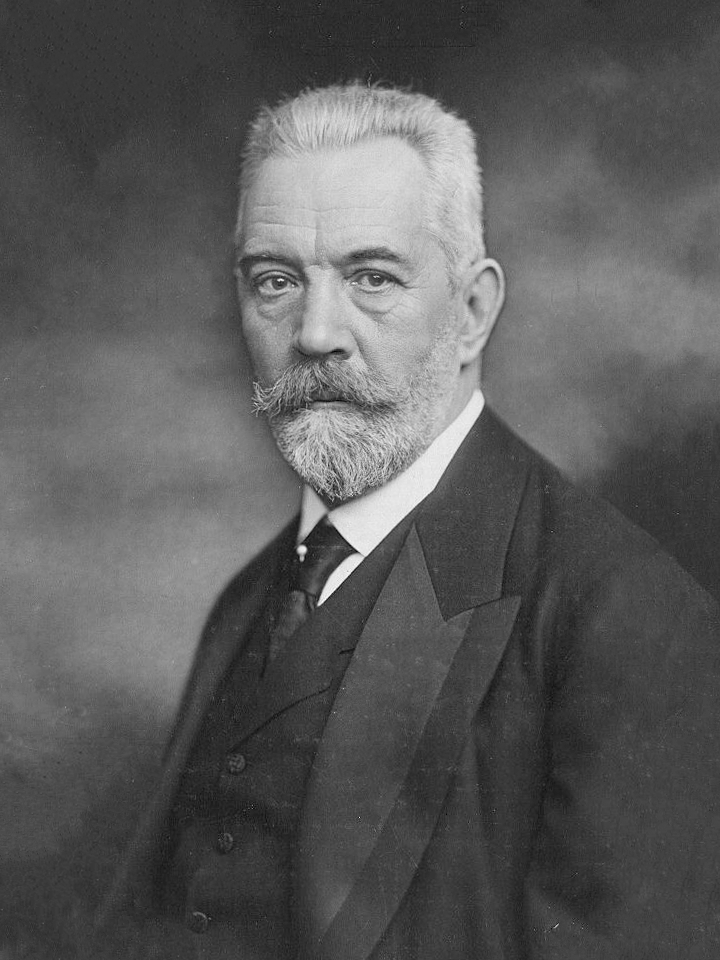
Theobald von Bethmann Hollweg, Chancellor of Germany from 1909 until 1917, was a proponent of German Lebensraum as a natural right of Imperial Germany.

In September 1914, when the German victory in the First World War appeared feasible, the German government introduced the Septemberprogramm as an official war aim (Kriegs‌ziel), which was secretly ordered by Chancellor Theobald von Bethmann Hollweg (1909–17), whereby, upon achieving battlefield victory, Germany would annex territories from western Poland to form the Polish Border Strip (Polnischer Grenzstreifen, c. 30,000 km^{2}, 12,000 square miles). Lebensraum would be realised by way of ethnic cleansing, the forcible removal of the local Slavic and Jewish populations, and the subsequent repopulation of the border strip with ethnic German colonists; likewise, the colonisations of Lithuania and Ukraine. However, military over-extension lost the war for Imperial Germany, and the Septemberprogramm went unrealised.

In April 1915, Chancellor von Bethmann Hollweg authorised the Polish Border Strip plans in order to take advantage of the extensive territories in Eastern Europe that Germany had conquered and held since early in the war. The decisive campaigns of Imperial Germany almost realised Lebensraum in the East, especially when Bolshevik Russia unilaterally withdrew as a combatant in the "Great War" among the European great powers—the Triple Entente (the Russian Empire, the French Third Republic, and the United Kingdom) and the Central Powers (the German Empire, Austria-Hungary, the Ottoman Empire, and the Kingdom of Bulgaria).

In March 1918, in an effort to reform and modernise the Russian Empire into a soviet republic, the Bolshevik government agreed to the strategically onerous territorial cessions stipulated in the Treaty of Brest-Litovsk (33% of arable land, 30% of industry, and 90% of the coal mines of Russia). As a result, Russia yielded to Germany much of the arable land of European Russia, the Baltic governorates, Belarus, Ukraine, and the Caucasus region. Despite such an extensive geopolitical victory, tactical defeat in the Western Front, strategic over-extension, and factional division in government compelled Imperial Germany to abandon the Eastern European Lebensraum gained with the Treaty of Brest-Litovsk in favour of the peace-terms of the Treaty of Versailles (1919), and yielded those Russian lands to Estonia, Finland, Latvia, Lithuania, Poland, and Ukraine.

As a casus belli for the conquest and colonisation of Polish territories as living-space and defensive-border for Imperial Germany, the Septemberprogramm derived from a foreign policy initially proposed by General Erich Ludendorff in 1914. Twenty-five years later, Nazi foreign policy resumed the cultural goal of the pursuit and realisation of German living-space at the expense of non-German peoples in Eastern Europe with the September Campaign (1 September – 6 October 1939) that began the Second World War in Europe. In Germany and the Two World Wars, the German historian Andreas Hillgruber said that the territorial gains of the Treaty of Brest-Litovsk (1918) were the imperial prototype for Adolf Hitler's Greater German Empire in Eastern Europe:

At the moment of the November 1918 ceasefire in the West, newspaper maps of the military situation showed German troops in Finland, holding a line from the Finnish fjords near Narva, down through Pskov–Orsha–Mogilev and the area south of Kursk, to the Don east of Rostov. Germany had thus secured Ukraine. The Russian recognition of Ukraine's separation, exacted at Brest–Litovsk, represented the key element in German efforts to keep Russia perpetually subservient. In addition, German troops held the Crimea, and were stationed, in smaller numbers, in Transcaucasia. Even the unoccupied "rump" Russia appeared—with the conclusion of the German–Soviet Supplementary Treaty, on 28 August 1918—to be in firm, though indirect, dependency on the Reich. Thus, Hitler's long-range aim, fixed in the 1920s, of erecting a German Eastern Imperium on the ruins of the Soviet Union was not simply a vision emanating from an abstract wish. In the Eastern sphere, established in 1918, this goal had a concrete point of departure. The German Eastern Imperium had already been—if only for a short time—a reality.

— Andreas Hillgruber, Germany and the Two World Wars (1967)

The Septemberprogramm (1914) documents "Lebensraum in the East" as philosophically integral to Germanic culture throughout the history of Germany; and that Lebensraum is not a racialist philosophy particular to the 20th century. As military strategy, the Septemberprogramm was unsuccessful due to its infeasibility, with too few soldiers to realise the plans during a two-front war. Politically, the Programm allowed the Imperial Government to learn the opinions of the nationalist, economic, and military elites of the German ruling class who financed and facilitated geopolitics. Nationally, the annexation and ethnic cleansing of Poland for German Lebensraum was an official and a popular subject of "nationalism-as-national-security" endorsed by German society, including the Social Democratic Party of Germany (SDP). In The Origins of the Second World War, the British historian A. J. P. Taylor wrote:

It is equally obvious that Lebensraum always appeared as one element in these blueprints. This was not an original idea of Hitler's. It was commonplace at the time. Volk ohne Raum (People Without Space), for instance, by Hans Grimm sold much better than Mein Kampf when it was published in 1925. For that matter, plans for acquiring new territory were much aired in Germany during the First World War. It used to be thought that these were the plans of a few crack-pot theorisers or of extremist organisations. Now we know better. In 1961, a German professor Fritz Fischer reported the results of his investigations into German war aims. These were indeed a "blueprint for aggression", or, as the professor called them, "a grasp at world power": Belgium under German control, the French iron-fields annexed to Germany, and, what is more, Poland and Ukraine to be cleared of their inhabitants and resettled with Germans. These plans were not merely the work of the German General Staff. They were endorsed by the German Foreign Office and by the "Good German", Bethmann–Hollweg.

— Alan J. Taylor, The Origins of the Second World War (1961)

== Interwar propaganda ==
In the national politics of the Weimar Republic (1919–1933), the German eugenicists took up the nationalist political slogan of Volk ohne Raum, and matched it with the racial slogan Volk ohne Jugend (a People without Youth), a cultural proposition that ignored the declining German birth rate (since the 1880s) and contradicted the popular belief that the "German race" was a vigorous and growing people. Despite each slogan (political and racial) being contradicted by the reality of such demographic facts, the nationalists' demands for Lebensraum proved to be ideologically valid politics in Weimar Germany.

In the lead-up to Anschluss (1938) and the invasion of Poland (1939), the propaganda of the Nazi Party in Germany used popular feelings of wounded national identity aroused in the aftermath of the First World War to promote policies of Lebensraum. Studies of the homeland focused on the lost colonies after the establishment of the Second Polish Republic, which was ratified by the Treaty of Versailles (Volk ohne Raum), as well as the "eternal Jewish threat" (Der ewige Jude, 1937). Emphasis was put on the need for rearmament and the pseudoscience of superior races in the pursuit of "blood and soil" (Blut und Boden).

During the twenty-one-year inter-war period between the First (1914–1918) and Second (1939–1945) World Wars, Lebensraum for Germany was the principal tenet of the extremist nationalism that characterised German party politics. The Nazis, led by Adolf Hitler, demanded not only the geographic reversion of Germany's post-war borders (to recuperate territory lost by the Treaty of Versailles), but also the German conquest and colonisation of Eastern Europe (whether or not those lands were German before 1918). To that end, Hitler said that flouting the Treaty of Versailles was required for Germany to obtain needed Lebensraum in Eastern Europe. During the 1920s, Heinrich Himmler—as a member of the Artaman League, an anti-Slav, anti-urban, and antisemitic organisation of "blood and soil" ideology—developed the Völkisch ideas that advocated Lebensraum, for the realisation of which he said that the:

Increase [of] our peasant population is the only effective defense against the influx of the Slav working-class masses from the East. As six hundred years ago, the German peasant's destiny must be to preserve and increase the German people's patrimony in their holy mother earth battle against the Slav race.

== Hitlerite doctrine of Lebensraum ==
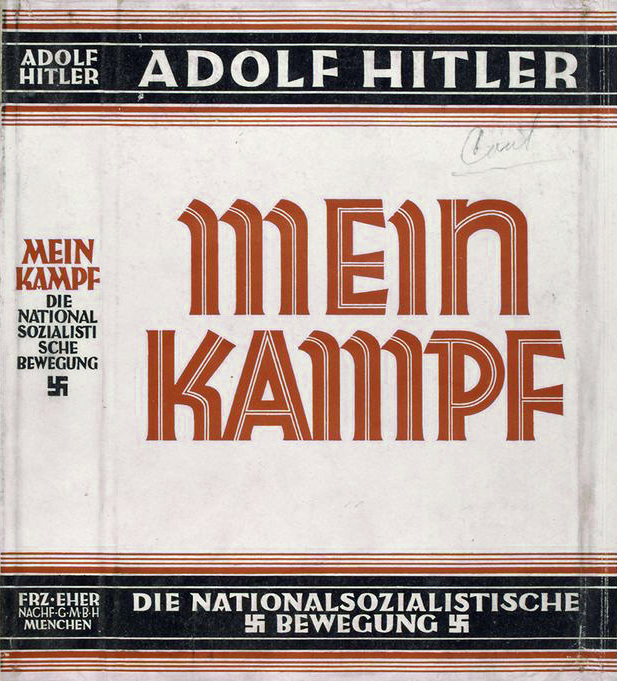
Mein Kampf (1926–1928), Hitler's political autobiography, presented the racist philosophy of Lebensraum advocated for Germany by the Nazi Party.

In Mein Kampf (1925), Hitler dedicated a full chapter—titled "Eastern Orientation or Eastern Policy"—to outlining the need for the new "living space" for Germany. He claimed that in his vision, the expanding number of German people would require more land, visually expressing it in speeches by stretching and yawning to evoke an image of living in comfort and contentment. He also believed achieving Lebensraum required political will, and that the Nazi movement ought to strive to expand population area for the German people and acquire new sources of food.

Lebensraum became the principal foreign-policy goal of the Nazi Party and the government of Nazi Germany (1933–1945). Hitler rejected the restoration of the pre-war borders of Germany as an inadequate half-measure towards reducing purported national overpopulation. From that perspective, he opined that the nature of national borders is always unfinished and momentary, and that their redrawing must continue as Germany's political goal. Identifying the conquest of Lebensraum as a major ideological goal of his party, Hitler wrote in Mein Kampf:

And so, we National Socialists consciously draw a line beneath the foreign policy tendency of our pre–War period. We take up where we broke off six hundred years ago. We stop the endless German movement to the south and west, and turn our gaze toward the land in the East. At long last, we break off the colonial and commercial policy of the pre–War period and shift to the soil policy of the future. But when we speak of new territory in Europe today we must principally think of Russia and the border States subject to her.

The ideologies found at the root of Hitler's implementation of Lebensraum modeled that of German colonialism of the New Imperialism period as well as the American ideology of manifest destiny. Hitler had great admiration for the United States' territorial expansion and saw the destruction of Native American peoples and their cultures that took place during the United States' westward expansion as a template for German expansion. He believed that in order to transform the German nation into a world superpower, Germany had to expand their geopolitical presence and act only in the interest of the German people. Hitler had also viewed with dismay the German reliance on food imports by sea during the First World War, believing it to be a contributing factor to Germany's defeat in the war. He believed that only through Lebensraum could Germany shift "its dependence for food... to its own imperial hinterland".

Hitler's bio-geo-political doctrine of Lebensraum consisted of two components existing in tension: the materialist endeavour to expand Germanic territories and the mystical quest to revive what the Nazis viewed as the "idealized German medieval past". The explicit embrace of these contradictions was evident in the promulgation of Nazi slogans such as "Blut und Boden" (blood and soil). National Socialism was presented by its ideologues as an organic world-view ("Weltanschauung") that subordinated all aspects of life—physical bodies, soul, mind, culture, government, religion, education, economy, etc.—into an "organic totality" existing within Lebensraum. Defining Nazism as a "Weltanschauung" during his speech at the 1933 Nuremberg rally, Hitler stated:

"Already in the word 'Weltanschauung' lies the solemn proclamation of a decision that all acts are based upon a certain point of view and a visible tendency. Such a view can be true or false: it is the starting point for every opinion on the appearance and events of life, and is therefore a binding and obligating law for every act. The more such an opinion covers the natural law of organic life, the better its conscious utility can be applied for the sake of the people's life."

=== Mein Kampf sequel, 1928 ===
In the unpublished sequel to Mein Kampf (English: My struggle), the Zweites Buch (1928, Second Book), Hitler further presents the ideology of Nazi Lebensraum, in accordance with the then-future foreign policy of the Nazi Party. To further German population growth, Hitler rejected the ideas of birth control and emigration, arguing that such practices weakened the people and culture of Germany, and that military conquest was the only means for obtaining Lebensraum:

The National Socialist Movement, on the contrary, will always let its foreign policy be determined by the necessity to secure the space necessary to the life of our Folk. It knows no Germanising or Teutonising, as in the case of the national bourgeoisie, but only the spread of its own Folk. It will never see in the subjugated, so called Germanised, Czechs or Poles a national, let alone Folkish, strengthening, but only the racial weakening of our Folk.

Therefore, the non-Germanic peoples of the annexed foreign territories would never be Germanised:

The völkisch State, conversely, must under no conditions annex Poles with the intention of wanting to make Germans out of them some day. On the contrary, it must muster the determination either to seal off these alien racial elements, so that the blood of its own Folk will not be corrupted again, or it must, without further ado, remove them and hand over the vacated territory to its own National Comrades.

=== Foreign-policy prime directive ===
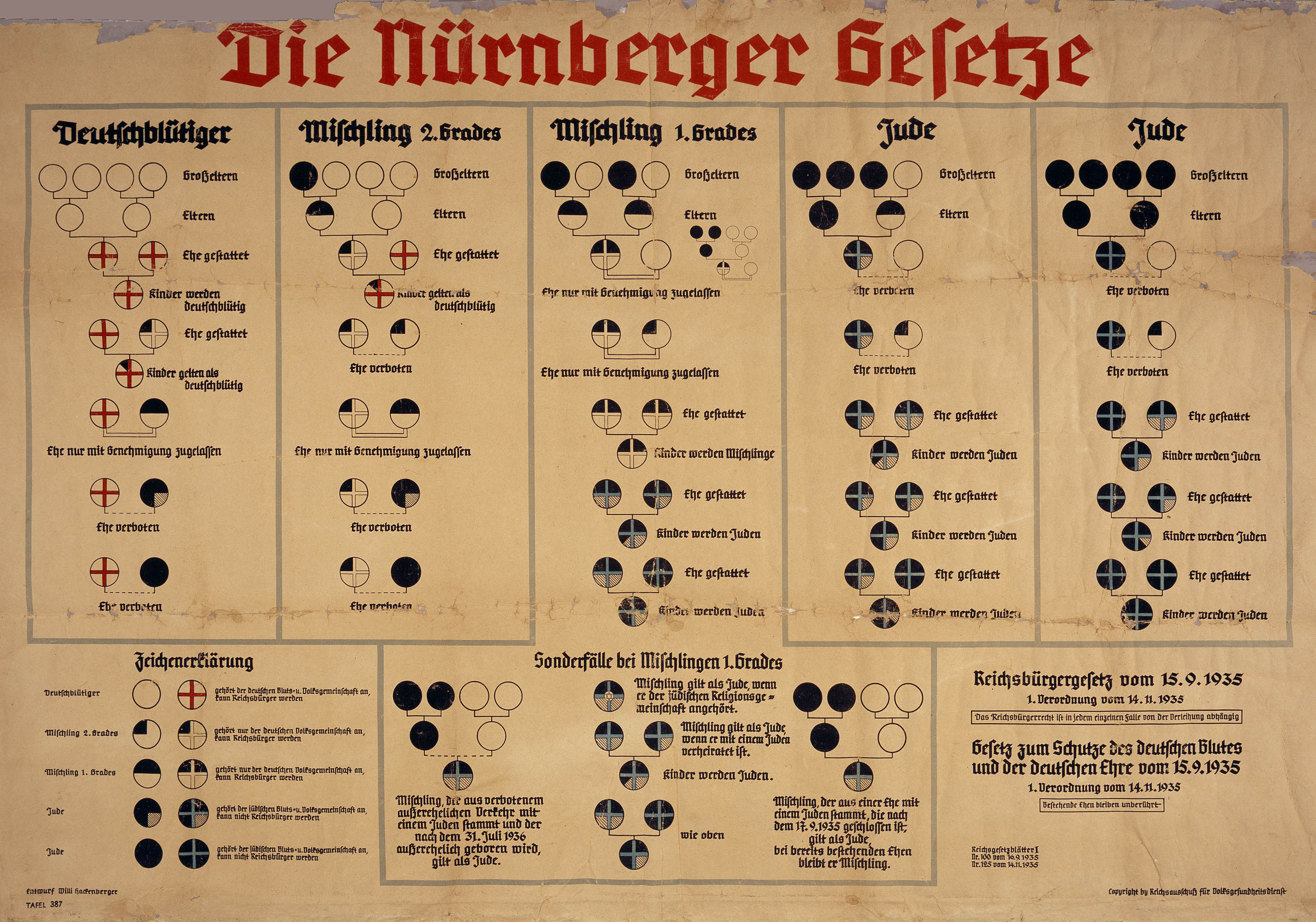
The Nuremberg Laws (1935) of Nazi Germany employed scientific racism to exclude Jews from mainstream society. People with four German grandparents (white circles) were classified as of "German blood," those with one or two Jewish grandparents (black circles) were considered to be Mischling, of "Mixed blood", while those with three or more Jewish grandparents were deemed to be Jews.

The conquest of living space for Germany was the foremost foreign-policy goal of the Nazis towards establishing the Greater Germanic Reich that was to last a thousand years. On 3 February 1933, at his initial meeting with the generals and admirals of Nazi Germany, Adolf Hitler said that the conquest of Lebensraum in Eastern Europe and its "ruthless Germanisation" were the ultimate geopolitical objectives of Reich foreign policy. The USSR was the country to provide sufficient Lebensraum for the Germans, because it possessed much agricultural land, and was inhabited by Slavic Untermenschen ruled by Jewish Bolshevism. The racism of Hitler's Lebensraum philosophy allowed only the Germanisation of the soil and the land, but not of the native peoples, who were to be destroyed, by slave labour and starvation.

=== Ideological motives ===
Anti-Slavism was a central component of the NSDAP's racist ideology, and a driving force behind Nazi Germany's irredentist schemes to seize "Lebensraum" through the eastward expansion of German territories. In the worldview of Adolf Hitler, the idea of restoring the 1914 borders of the German Reich (Imperial Germany, 1871–1918) was absurd, because those national borders did not provide sufficient Lebensraum for the German population; only a foreign policy for the geopolitical conquest of the proper amount of Lebensraum would justify the necessary sacrifices entailed by war.

Hitler thought that history was dominated by a merciless struggle for survival among the different races of mankind; and that the races who possessed a great national territory were innately stronger than those races who possessed a small national territory—which the 'Germanic Aryan race' could take by what he viewed as their natural right. Such official racist perspectives for the establishment of German Lebensraum allowed the Nazi regime to unilaterally launch a war of aggression (blitzkrieg) against the countries of Eastern Europe, ideologically justified as historical recuperation of the Oium (lands) that the Slavs had conquered from the native Ostrogoths.

Nazi propaganda depicted Eastern Europe as historically Germanic territories, promoting the myth that these regions were stolen from Aryan races by Hunnic and Avar tribes.
Hitler viewed Slavs as primitive subhumans (Untermenschen), and he detested the German empire's alliance with Austria-Hungary during World War I. In his works such as Mein Kampf and Zweites Buch, Hitler viewed the Slavs as lacking the capability to form a state. Although Hitler openly spoke about the need for living space in the 1920s, he never publicly spoke about it during his first years in power. It was not until 1937, with the German rearmament program well under way, that he began again to publicly speak about the need for living space.

== Lebensraum in practice: the Second World War ==
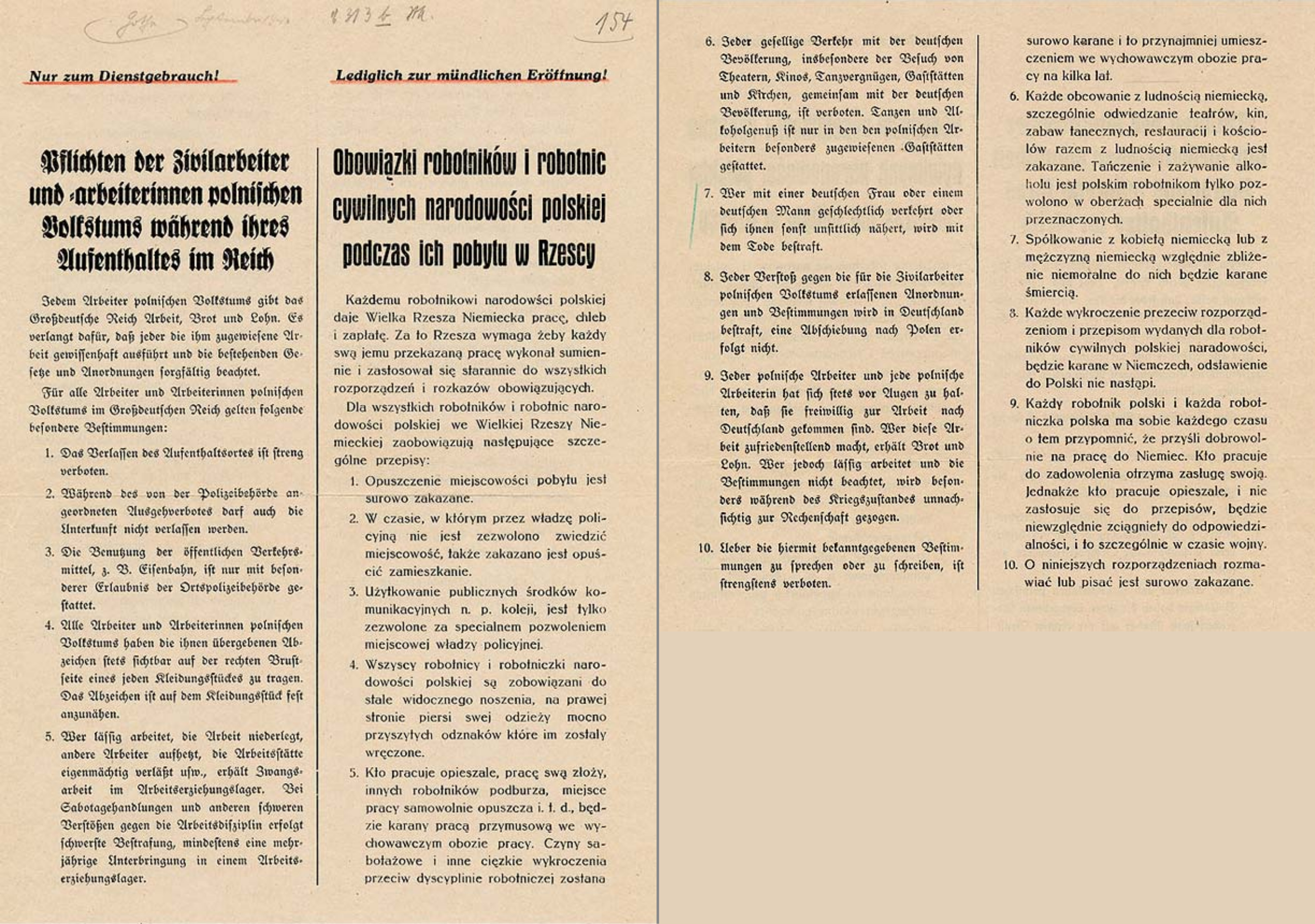
Poster (in German and Polish): Obligations of Polish Workers in Germany, which included the death penalty for sexual relations with a German.

The bio-geo-political nature of Nazi Weltanschauung was the core ideological force that instigated Nazi Germany to launch its violent project in pursuit of a new global order. This scheme aimed to dissolve the contradictions between the Nazi conceptualizations of "race" and "space" through the creation of a Germanic Lebensraum and achievement of world domination by the Nordic people. This combination of biopolitical and geo-political agenda of the Nazi Reich became the basis for its Germanization policies, the mission of what it regarded as the "purification of the Volksgemeinschaft", as well as its state-sponsored genocidal apparatus.

On 6 October 1939, Hitler told the Reichstag that after the fall of Poland the most important matter was "a new order of ethnographic relations, that is to say, resettlement of nationalities". On 20 October 1939, Hitler told General Wilhelm Keitel that the war would be a difficult "racial struggle" and that the General Government was to "purify the Reich territory from Jews and Polacks, too." Likewise, in October 1939, Nazi propaganda instructed Germans to view Poles, Jews, and Gypsies as Untermenschen.

Nazi Germany's pursuit of its bio-geo-political ambitions was carried out through fanatical perpetration of a racist war of annihilation (Vernichtungskrieg) which inflicted industrial-scale terrorism against entire populations. These policies resulted in the genocide of numerous ethnic groups in German-occupied territories, including the Jews, Poles, Russians, Romani people, etc. and also contributed to the failure of German war aims. Nazi policies in German-occupied territories were marked by spontaneous adaptation, on-the-fly modifications, and bureaucratic competition, underscoring the impulsive nature of Hitlerism.

In 1941, in a speech to the Eastern Front Battle Group Nord, Himmler said that the war against the Soviet Union was a war of ideologies and races, between Nazism and Jewish Bolshevism and between the Germanic (Nordic) peoples and the Untermenschen peoples of the East. Moreover, in one of the secret Posen speeches to the SS-Gruppenführer at Posen, Himmler said: "the mixed race of the Slavs is based on a sub-race with a few drops of our blood, the blood of a leading race; the Slav is unable to control himself and create order." In that vein, Himmler published the pamphlet Der Untermensch, which featured photographs of ideal racial types, Aryans, contrasted with the barbarian races, descended from Attila the Hun and Genghis Khan, to the massacres committed in the Soviet Union dominated by Jewish Bolshevism.

With the Polish decrees (8 March 1940), the Nazis ensured that the racial inferiority of the Poles was legally recognized in the German Reich, and regulated the working and living conditions of Polish laborers (Zivilarbeiter). The Polish decrees also established that any Pole "who has sexual relations with a German man or woman, or approaches them in any other improper manner, will be punished by death." The Gestapo were vigilant of sexual relations between Germans and Poles, and pursued anyone suspected of race defilement (Rassenschande); likewise, there were proscriptions of sexual relations between Germans and other ethnic groups brought in from Eastern Europe.

"Hitler's ideas of Lebensraum, also elaborated in Mein Kampf, meant that his desire to expand German power and control to the east with the intention of colonising this territory with German settlers would involve the expulsion, enslavement and death of the Slavs who lived there.. If the awful counterfactual of a Nazi victory had come to pass... Russians, Belarusians and Ukrainians would surely have shared the fate of the Poles and been eliminated culturally and ethnically as distinct peoples and nations. Genocidal actions against those peoples would have been completed."

— Historian Norman Naimark

As official policy, Reichsführer SS Heinrich Himmler said that no drop of German blood would be lost or left behind to mingle with any alien races; and that the Germanisation of Eastern Europe would be complete when "in the East dwell only men with truly German [and] Germanic blood". In the secret memorandum Reflections on the Treatment of Peoples of Alien Races in the East (25 May 1940), Himmler outlined the future of the Eastern European peoples: (i) division of native ethnic groups found in the new living-space; (ii) limited, formal education of four years of elementary school (to teach them only how to write their names and to count to five hundred); and (iii) obedience of the orders of Germans.

Despite Nazi Germany's official racism, the extermination of Eastern European native populations was not always necessary because the racial policy of Nazi Germany regarded some Eastern European peoples as being of Aryan-Nordic stock, especially the local leaders. On March 4, 1941, Himmler introduced the German People's List (Deutsche Volksliste), which intended to segregate the inhabitants of German-occupied territories into categories of desirability according to criteria. In the same memorandum, Himmler advocated the kidnapping of children who appeared to be Nordic because it would "remove the danger that this subhuman people (Untermenschenvolk) of the East through such children might acquire a leader class from such people of good blood, which would be dangerous for us because they would be our equals." According to Himmler, the destruction of the Soviet Union would have led to the exploitation of millions of peoples as slave labor in the occupied territories and the eventual re-population of the areas with Germans.

Nazi Germany's initiation of Operation Barbarossa was motivated by the racial theories and bio-political doctrines of the NSDAP, which were fervently anti-Slavic, anti-communist and antisemitic. The Nazi party's doctrine of Lebensraum was central to its programme of waging a racial war against Russia, a geopolitical agenda advanced by Hitler since the 1920s.

During the final months of the Second World War, Nazi Germany intensified its antisemitic, anti-Slavic, and anti-communist propaganda. Hitler fanatically reiterated the core ideological tenets of Nazism, such as his goal of expanding German territories eastwards in pursuit of Lebensraum. He continued to advocate the Germanic settler-colonial project in Eastern Europe, including his desire to exterminate a significant portion of the Slavic populations. In his letter to German field marshal Wilhelm Keitel written on 29 April 1945, Hitler stated:

"Our goal must still be the capture of living space in the East for the German nation."

=== Classification under the laws in the annexed territories ===
The Deutsche Volksliste was split into four categories. Men in the first two categories were required to enlist for compulsory military service. Membership in the Schutzstaffel (SS) was reserved for men from Category I only:

German People's List (Deutsche Volksliste)
Classification	Translation	Heritage	Definition
Volksdeutsche	Ethnically German	German	Persons of German descent who had engaged themselves in favour of the Reich before 1939
Deutschstämmige	German descent	German	Persons of German descent who had remained passive
Eingedeutschte	Voluntarily Germanised	Part-German	Indigenous persons considered by the Nazis as partly Polonized (mainly Silesians and Kashubians); refusal to join this list often led to deportation to a concentration camp
Rückgedeutschte	Forcibly Germanised	Part-German	Persons of Polish nationality considered "racially valuable", but who resisted Germanisation

Hitler, who was born in the ethnically diverse Austrian-Hungarian Empire, avowed in Mein Kampf (1926) that Germanising Austrian Slavs by language during the Age of Partitions could not have turned them into fully fledged Germans, because no "Negro" nor a "Chinaman" would ever "become German" just because he has learned to speak German. He believed that no visible differences between peoples could be bridged by the use of a common language. Any such attempts would lead to the "bastardization" of the German element, he said. Likewise, Hitler criticized the previous attempts at Germanisation of the Poles in the Prussian Partition as an erroneous idea, based on the same false reasoning. The Polish people could not possibly be Germanised by being compelled to speak German because they belonged to a different race, he said; "the result would have been fatal" for the purity of the German nation because the foreigners would "compromise" by their inferiority "the dignity and nobility" of the German nation. During the war, Hitler remarked in his "Table Talk" that people should only be Germanised if they were to improve the German blood line:

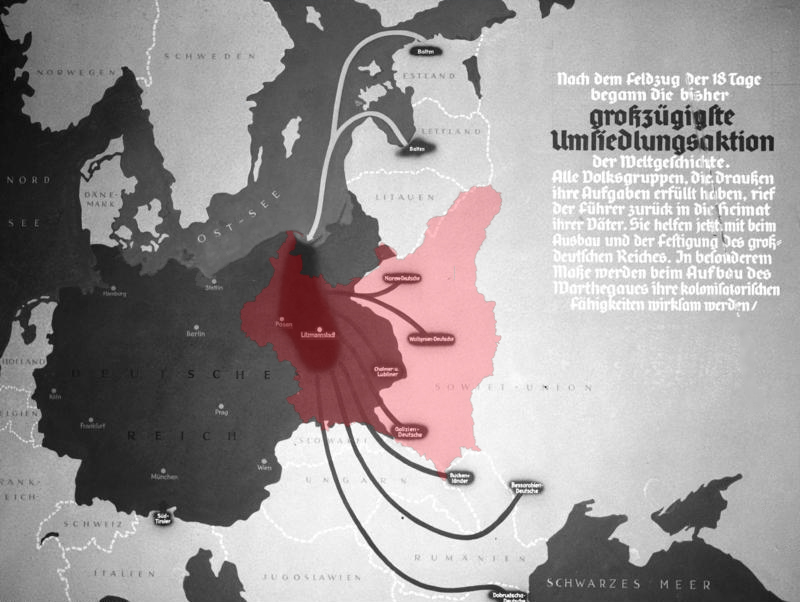
Nazi Germany in 1940 (dark grey) after the conquest of Poland together with the USSR, showing pockets of German colonists resettled into the annexed territories of Poland from the Soviet "sphere of influence" during the Heim ins Reich action. A red outline of pre-war Poland is superimposed here over the original Nazi propaganda poster; the original German print made no mention of Poland.

There is one cardinal principle. This question of the Germanisation of certain peoples must not be examined in the light of abstract ideas and theory. We must examine each particular case. The only problem is to make sure whether the offspring of any race will mingle well with the German population and will improve it, or whether, on the contrary (as is the case when Jew blood is mixed with German blood), negative results will arise. Unless one is completely convinced that the foreigners whom one proposes to introduce into the German community will have a beneficial effect, well, I think it's better to abstain, however strong the sentimental reasons may be which urge such a course on us. There are plenty of Jews with blue eyes and blond hair, and not a few of them have the appearance which strikingly supports the idea of the Germanisation of their kind. It has, however, been indisputably established that, in the case of Jews, if the physical characteristics of the race are sometimes absent for a generation or two, they will inevitably reappear in the next generation.

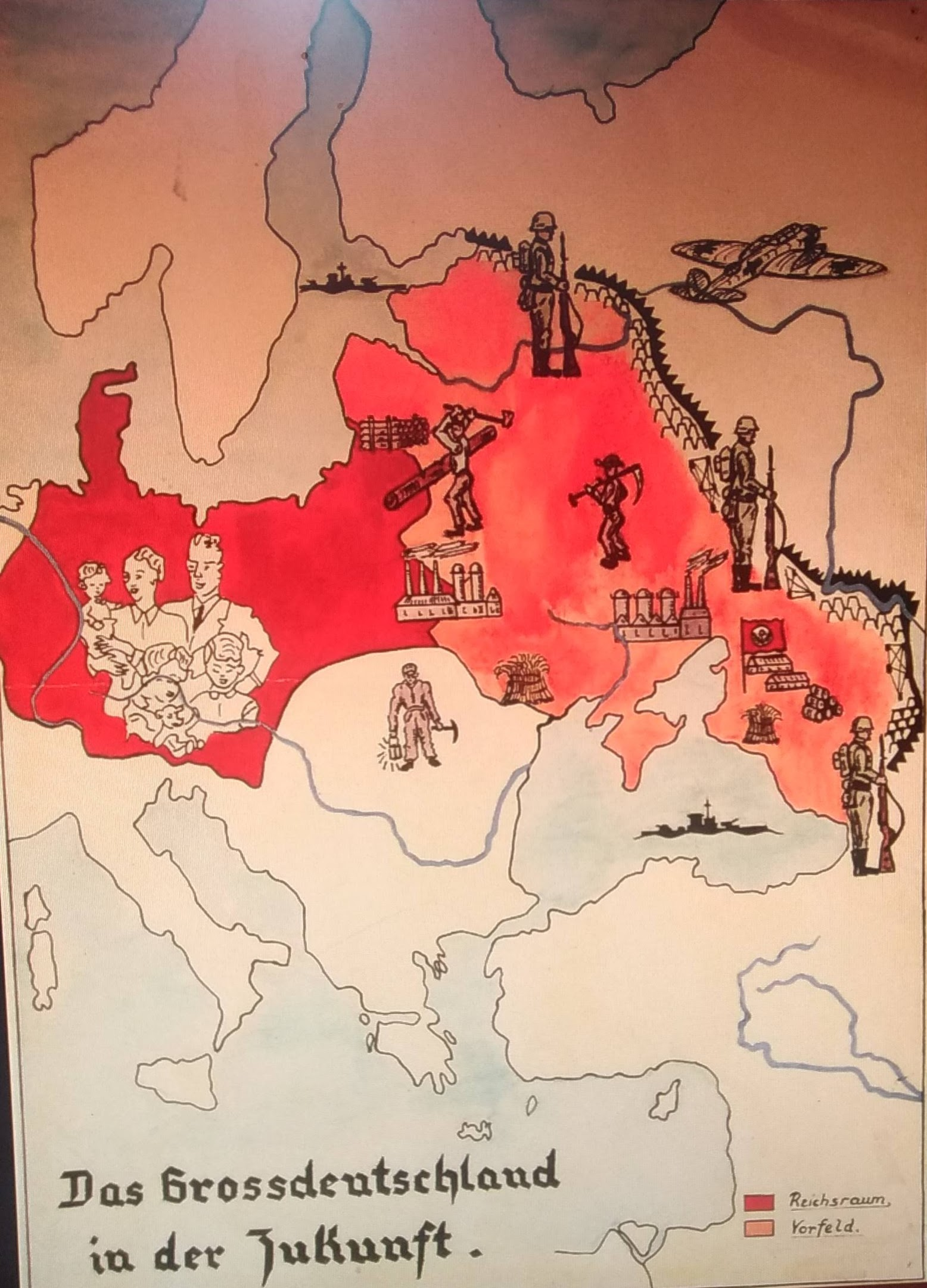
Borders of Greater Germanic Reich envisaged in the Nazi-era propaganda map "Das Grossdeutschland in der Zukunft" (1943). The map depicts occupied Eastern Europe as a settler-colonial territory of Nazi Germany.

Informed by the blood and soil beliefs of ethnic identity—a philosophic basis of Lebensraum—Nazi policy required destroying the USSR for the lands of Russia to become the granary of Germany. The Germanisation of Russia required the destruction of its cities, in an effort to vanquish Russianness, Communism, and Jewish Bolshevism. To that effect, Hitler ordered the Siege of Leningrad (September 1941 – January 1944), to raze the city and destroy the native Russian population. Geopolitically, the establishment of German Lebensraum in the east of Europe would thwart blockades, like those that occurred during the First World War, which starved the people of Germany. Moreover, using Eastern Europe to feed Germany also was intended to exterminate millions of Slavs, by slave labour and starvation. When deprived of producers, a workforce, and customers, native industry would cease and disappear from the Germanised region, which then became agricultural land for settlers from Nazi Germany.

The Germanised lands of Eastern Europe would be settled by the Wehrbauer, a soldier–peasant who was to maintain a fortified line of defence, which would prevent any non–German civilisation from arising to threaten the Greater Germanic Reich. At a conference in 1941, Hitler stated:

"There is only one task: Germanization through the introduction of Germans [to the area] and to treat the original inhabitants like Indians. … I intend to stay this course with ice-cold determination. I feel myself to be the executor of the will of history. What people think of me at present is all of no consequence. Never have I heard a German who has bread to eat express concern that the ground where the grain was grown had to be conquered by the sword. We eat Canadian wheat and never think of the Indians."

Plans for the Germanisation of western Europe were less severe, as the Nazis needed the collaboration of the local political and business establishments, especially that of local industry and their skilled workers. Moreover, Nazi racial policies considered the populations of western Europe more racially acceptable to Aryan standards of racial purity. In practice, the number and assortment of Nazi racial categories indicated that "East is bad and West is acceptable"; thus, a person's "race" was a matter of life or death in countries under Nazi occupation.

The racist ideology of Lebensraum also comprised the North German racial stock of the northern-European peoples of Scandinavia (Denmark, Norway, Sweden); and the continental-European peoples of Alsace and Lorraine, Belgium and northern France; whilst the United Kingdom would either be annexed or be made a puppet state. Moreover, the poor military performance of the Italian armed forces forced Fascist Italy's withdrawal from the war in 1943, which then made northern Italy a territory to be annexed to the Greater Germanic Reich.

Collaborationism

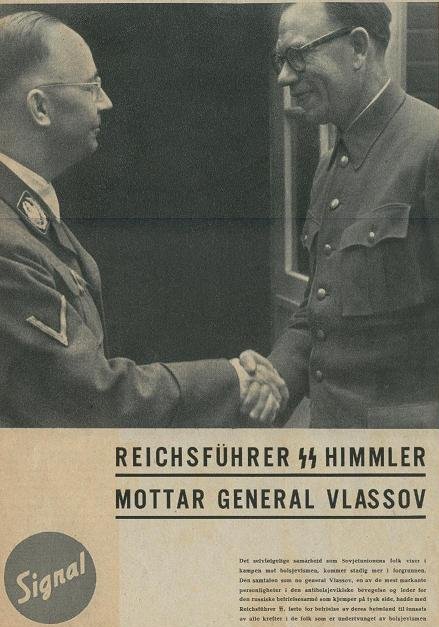
Himmler and the Soviet defector general Andrey Vlasov, the leader of the Russian collaborationist movement

For political expediency, the Nazis continually modified their racist politics towards non–Germanic peoples—and so continually redefined the ideological meaning of Lebensraum—in order to collaborate with other peoples, in service of the Reich's foreign policy. Early in his career as leader of the Nazis, Adolf Hitler said he would accept friendly relations with the USSR, on condition that the Soviet government re-establish the disadvantageous borders of European Russia, which were demarcated in the Treaty of Brest-Litovsk (1918). This made possible the restoration of Russo–German diplomatic relations.

In 1921–22, Hitler said that German Lebensraum might be achieved with a smaller USSR, created by sponsoring anti-communist Russians in deposing the Communist government of the Bolsheviks; however, by the end of 1922, Hitler changed his opinion when there arose the possibility of an Anglo–German geopolitical alliance to destroy the USSR. However, following the invasion of the USSR in Operation Barbarossa (1941), the strategic stance of the Nazi régime towards a smaller, independent Russia was affected by political pressure from the German Army, who asked Hitler to endorse the creation of the anti–Communist Russian Liberation Army (ROA) and its integration into the Wehrmacht operations in Russia. The ROA was an organization of defectors, led by General Andrey Vlasov, who meant to depose the régime of Joseph Stalin and the Russian Communist Party.

Initially, Hitler rejected the idea of collaborating with the peoples in the East. However, Nazis such as Joseph Goebbels and Alfred Rosenberg were in favor of collaboration against Bolshevism and offering some independence to the peoples of the East. In 1940, Himmler opened up membership for people he regarded as being of "related stock", which resulted in a number of right-wing Scandinavians signing up to fight in the Waffen-SS. When the Germans invaded the Soviet Union in 1941, further volunteers from France, Spain, Belgium, the Netherlands, Czechoslovakia, and Croatia signed up to fight for the Nazi cause. After 1942, when the war turned decisively against Nazi Germany, further recruits from the occupied territories signed up to fight for the Nazis. Hitler was worried about the foreign legions on the Eastern Front; he remarked that "One mustn't forget that, unless he is convinced of his racial membership of the Germanic Reich, the foreign legionary is bound to feel that he's betraying his country."

After further losses of manpower, the Nazis tried to persuade the forced foreign laborers in the Reich to fight against Bolshevism. Martin Bormann issued a memorandum on 5 May 1943:

It impossible to win someone over to a new idea while insulting his inner sense of worth at the same time. One cannot expect the highest level of performance from people who are called beasts, barbarians, and subhuman. Instead, positive qualities such as the will to fight Bolshevism, the desire to safeguard one's own existence and that of one's country, commitment and willingness to work are to be encouraged and promoted. Moreover, everything must be done to encourage the necessary cooperation of the European peoples in the fight against Bolshevism.

In 1944, as the German army continually lost battles and territory to the Red Army, the leaders of Nazi Germany, especially Reichsfuhrer-SS Heinrich Himmler, recognized the political, ideological, and military value of the collaborationist ROA in fighting Bolshevism. Secretly, Himmler in his Posen speeches remarked: "I wouldn't have had any objections, if we had hired Mr. Vlasov and every other Slavic subject wearing a Russian general's uniform, to make propaganda against the Russians. I wouldn't have any objections at all. Wonderful."

=== Implementation ===
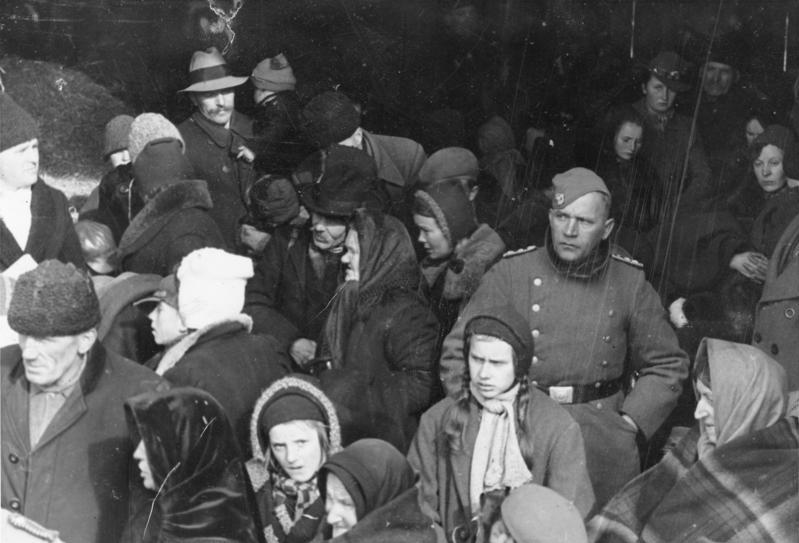
The Nazi establishment of German Lebensraum required the expulsion of the Poles from Poland, such as their expulsion from the Reichsgau Wartheland in 1939.

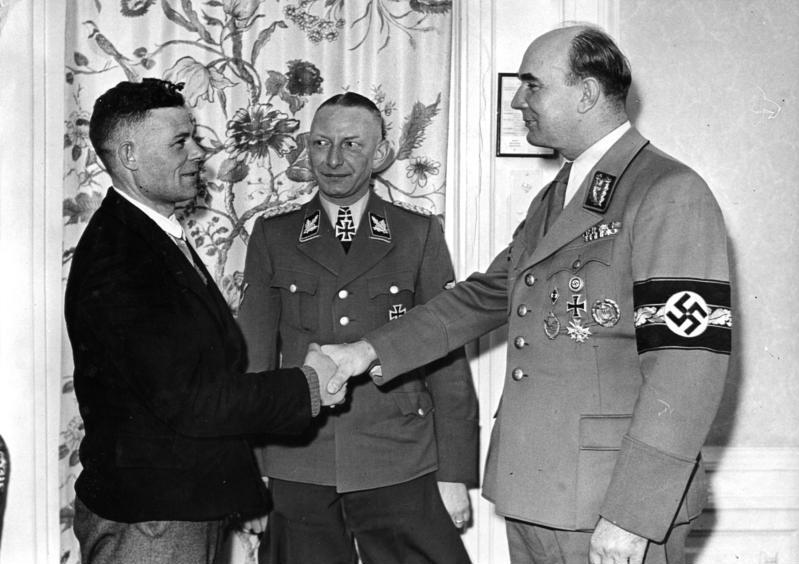
Germanisation of Poland: SS Obergruppenführer Arthur Greiser welcomes the millionth Eastern European Volksdeutscher to be resettled in annexed Polish territories, March 1944.

Nazi policies in German-occupied territories were marked by spontaneous adaptation, on-the-fly modifications, and bureaucratic competition, underscoring the impulsive nature of Hitlerism. Nazi Germany's pursuit of its bio-geo-political ambitions was carried out through fanatical perpetration of a racist war of annihilation (Vernichtungskrieg) which inflicted industrial-scale terrorism against entire populations. These policies resulted in the genocide of numerous ethnic groups in German-occupied territories, including the Jews, Poles, Russians, Romani people, etc. and also contributed to the failure of German war aims.

The Polish Campaign was Nazi Germany's first implementation of Lebensraum policy, beginning with the Occupation of Poland (1939–1945). In October 1939, Heinrich Himmler became the Reich Commissioner for the Consolidation of German Nationhood, tasked with returning all ethnic Germans (Volksdeutsche) to the Reich, preventing harmful foreign influences upon the German people, and creating new settlement areas (especially for returning Volksdeutsche).

From mid–1940, the ethnic cleansing (forcible removal) of Poles from the Reichsgau Wartheland initially occurred across the border, to the General Government (a colonial political entity ostensibly autonomous of the Reich); then, after the invasion of the USSR, the displaced Polish populations were jailed in Polenlager (Pole-storage camps) in Silesia and sent to villages designated as ghettoes. In four years of Germanisation (1940–44), the Nazis forcibly removed some 50,000 ethnic Poles from the Polish territories annexed to the Greater German Reich, notably some 18,000–20,000 ethnic Poles from Żywiec County, in Polish Silesia, effected in Action Saybusch.

The Nazi invasion of Poland consisted of atrocities committed against Polish men, women, and children. The German population's psychological acceptance of the atrocities was achieved with Nazi propaganda (print, radio, cinema), a key factor behind the manufactured consent that justified German brutality towards civilians; by continually manipulating the national psychology, the Nazis convinced the German people to believe that Slavs and Jews were Untermenschen. For example, leaders of the Hitler Youth were issued pamphlets (such as On the German People and its Territory) meant to influence the rank-and-file Hitler Youth about the necessity of Nazi racist practices in obtaining Lebensraum for the German people. Likewise, in the Reich proper, schoolchildren were given propaganda pamphlets (such as You and Your People) explaining the importance of Lebensraum for the future of Germany and the German people.

On 21 June 1941, Himmler commissioned the drafting of Generalplan Ost (GPO), which was to be the blue-print of German expansionist and extermination policies in Eastern Europe. The draft, which was based on the proposals of Nazi agronomist Konrad Meyer, were forwarded to Hitler for approval. On 16 July 1941, Hitler appointed Alfred Rosenberg as Reich Minister for Occupied Eastern Territories, giving him directives to monitor SS activities. GPO was approved by Hitler's orders in May 1942 and became the official occupation program of Nazi Germany in July 1942. The program launched the genocide of millions of Slavs, Jews, Romani people, etc. through various methods like mass-killings, forced starvations, extermination through slave labour, etc. Ethnic cleansing was initiated to forcibly displace remaining non-Germanic inhabitants eastwards. Under the objectives of Generalplan Ost, the evacuated territories were to be colonized by over 10 million German settlers and establish the blueprint for a Greater Germanic Reich. Germanization campaigns were extolled in Nazi propaganda as the modern adaptation of what it portrayed as "civilizing missions" of the Teutonic Order.

=== East–West frontier ===
Concerning the geographic extent of the Greater Germanic Reich, Adolf Hitler rejected the Ural Mountains as an adequate eastern border for Germany, arguing that such mid-sized mountains would not suffice as the boundary between the "European and Asiatic worlds", and that only a living wall of racially pure Aryans would suffice as a border. He also advocated that permanent war in the East would "preserve the vitality of the race":

The real frontier is the one that separates the Germanic world from the Slav world. It is our duty to place it where we want it to be. If anyone asks where we obtain the right to extend the Germanic space to the east, we reply that, for a nation, its awareness of what it represents carries this right with it. It is success that justifies everything. The reply to such questions can only be of an empirical nature. It is inconceivable that a higher people should painfully exist on a soil too narrow for it, while amorphous masses, which contribute nothing to civilization, occupy infinite tracts of a soil that is one of the richest in the world ...

We must create conditions for our people that favour its multiplication, and we must, at the same time, build a dike against the Russian flood ... Since there is no natural protection against such a flood, we must meet it with a living wall. A permanent war on the eastern front will help form a sound race of men, and will prevent us from relapsing into the softness of a Europe thrown back upon itself. It should be possible for us to control this region to the east with two hundred and fifty thousand men, plus a cadre of good administrators ...

This space in Russia must always be dominated by Germans.

In 1941, the Reich decided that within two decades, by the year 1961, Poland would have been emptied of Poles and re-populated with ethnic-German colonists from Bukovina, Eastern Galicia, and Volhynia. The ruthless Germanisation that Hitler enacted for Lebensraum was attested in the reports of Wehrbauer (soldier–peasant) colonists assigned to ethnically-cleansed Poland—of finding half-eaten meals on the table and unmade beds in the houses given them by the Nazis. Baltic Germans from Estonia and Latvia were evaluated for racial purity; those classified to the highest category, Ost-Falle, were resettled in the Eastern Wall.

Area and population data in 1939 of Nazi German Gaue that included annexed territories of Poland: Estimates of 1947 as cited by Stanisław Waszak, Demographic Picture of the German Occupation (1970)
Gau	Total population	Poles	Germans	Jews	Ukrainians	Others
Wartheland	4,933,600	4,220,200	324,600	384,500	–	4,300
Upper Silesia	2,632,630	2,404,670	98,204	124,877	1,202	3,677
Danzig-West Prussia	1,571,215	1,393,717	158,377	14,458	1,648	3,020
East Prussia	1,001,560	886,061	18,400	79,098	8,099	9,902
Total	10,139,005	8,904,648	599,576	602,953	10,949	20,899

Moreover, the Germanisation of Russia which began with Operation Barbarossa (June–September 1941) meant to conquer and colonise European Russia as the granary of Germany. For those Slavic lands, the Nazi theorist and ideologue Alfred Rosenberg proposed administrative organisation by the Reichskommissariate—countries consolidated into colonial realms ruled by a commissar:

Reichskommisariat name	Area included
Ostland	The Baltic States, Belarus, and western Russia
Ukraine	Ukraine (minus East Galicia and the Romanian-controlled Transnistria Governorate), extended eastwards to the River Volga
Moskowien	The Moscow metropolis and European Russia, exclusive of Karelia and the Kola peninsula, which the Nazis promised to Finland in 1941
Kaukasien	The Caucasus

In 1943, in the secret Posen speeches, Heinrich Himmler spoke of the Ural Mountains as the eastern border of the Greater Germanic Reich. He asserted that the Germanic race would gradually expand to that eastern border, so that, in several generations' time, the German Herrenvolk, as the leading people of Europe, would be ready to "resume the battles of destiny against Asia", which were "sure to break out again"; and that the defeat of Europe would mean "the destruction of the creative power of the Earth". Nonetheless, the Ural Mountains were a secondary objective of the secret Generalplan Ost (Master Plan East) for the colonisation of Eastern Europe.

The never-established Reichskommissariat Turkestan would have been the closest territory to the Empire of Japan's north-westernmost extents of its own Greater East Asia Co-Prosperity Sphere, as a "living wall" said to be defending the easternmost Lebensraum lands. It also would have elevated higher-social-class Chinese and nearly all Japanese-ethnicity populations as "honorary Aryans", partly to Hitler's own stated respect in Mein Kampf towards those specific East Asian ethnicities.

The early stages of Lebensraum im Osten (Lebensraum in the East) featured the ethnic cleansing of Russians and other Slavs (Galicians, Karelians, Ukrainians, et al.) from their lands, and the consolidation of their countries into the Reichskommissariat administration that extended to the Ural Mountains, the geographic frontier of Europe and Asia. To manage the ethnic, racial, and political populations of the USSR, the German Army promptly organized collaborationist, anti-Communist, puppet governments in the Reichskomissariat Ostland (1941–45) and the Reichskommissariat Ukraine (1941–44). Nonetheless, despite the initial strategic successes of Operation Barbarossa, the Red Army's counterattack victories against the German Army at the Battle of Stalingrad (August 1942 – February 1943) and at the Battle of Kursk (July–August 1943) in Russia, plus the Allied Operation Husky (July–August 1943) in Sicily, thwarted the full implementation of Nazi Lebensraum in Eastern Europe.

== Historical retrospective ==
=== Scale ===
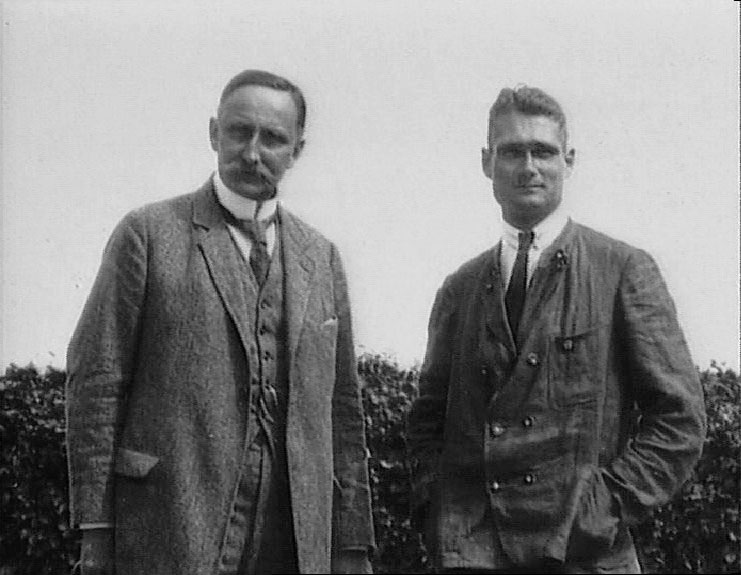
The geopolitician Karl Haushofer (left) provided the Nazis with intellectual, academic, scientific rationalisations for Lebensraum, transmitted to Chancellor Adolf Hitler, by way of Rudolf Hess (right), who was Haushofer's student.

The scope of the enterprise and the scale of the territories invaded and conquered for Germanisation by the Nazis indicated two ideological purposes for Lebensraum, and their relation to the geopolitical purposes of the Nazis: (i) a program of global conquest, begun in Central Europe; and (ii) a program of continental European conquest, limited to Eastern Europe. From the strategic perspectives of the Stufenplan ("Plan in Stages"), the global- and continental-interpretations of Nazi Lebensraum are feasible, and neither exclusive of each other, nor counter to Hitler's foreign-policy goals for Germany.

Within the Reich régime proper, the Nazis held different definitions of Lebensraum, such as the idyllic, agrarian society that required much arable land, advocated by the blood-and-soil ideologist Richard Walther Darré and Reichsführer-SS Heinrich Himmler; and the urban, industrial state, that required raw materials and slaves, advocated by Adolf Hitler. Operation Barbarossa—the invasion of the Soviet Union in summer 1941—required a compromise of concept, purpose, and execution to realise Hitler's conception of Lebensraum in the Slavic lands of Eastern Europe.

During the Posen speeches, Himmler spoke about the deaths of millions of Soviet prisoners of war and foreign labourers:

One basic principle must be the absolute rule for the SS men: We must be honest, decent, loyal and comradely to members of our own blood and to nobody else. What happens to a Russian, to a Czech, does not interest me in the slightest. What other nations can offer in the way of good blood of our type, we will take, if necessary, by kidnapping their children and raising them here with us. Whether nations live in prosperity or starve to death interests me only so far as we need them as slaves for our culture; otherwise, it is of no interest to me. Whether 10,000 Russian females fall down from exhaustion while digging an anti-tank ditch interests me only insofar as the anti-tank ditch for Germany is finished.

=== Ideology ===
Racism usually is not a concept integral to the ideology of territorial expansionism; nor to the original meaning of the term Lebensraum ("biological habitat"), as defined by the ethnographer and geographer Friedrich Ratzel. Nonetheless, Nazism, the ideology of the Nazi Party, established racism as a philosophic basis of Lebensraum-as-geopolitics; which Adolf Hitler presented as Nazi racist ideology in his political autobiography Mein Kampf (1926–28). Moreover, the geopolitical interpretations of national living-space by the academic Karl Haushofer (a teacher of Rudolf Hess, Hitler's deputy) provided Adolf Hitler with the intellectual, academic, and scientific rationalisations that justified the territorial expansion of Germany—by the natural right of the German Aryan race—to expand into, occupy, and exploit the lands of other countries, regardless of the native populations. In Mein Kampf, Hitler explained the living-space "required" by Nazi Germany:

In an era when the Earth is gradually being divided up among states, some of which embrace almost entire continents, we cannot speak of a world power in connection with a formation whose political mother country is limited to the absurd area of five hundred thousand square kilometres. Without consideration of traditions and prejudices, Germany must find the courage to gather our people, and their strength, for an advance along the road that will lead this people from its present, restricted living space to new land and soil, and, hence, also free it from the danger of vanishing from the earth, or of serving others as a slave nation. For it is not in colonial acquisitions that we must see the solution of this problem, but exclusively in the acquisition of a territory for settlement, which will enhance the area of the mother country, and hence not only keep the new settlers in the most intimate community with the land of their origin, but secure for the entire area those advantages which lie in its unified magnitude.

=== Factor that played a role in Germany's defeat ===
Several historians have evaluated the Nazi pursuit of "Lebensraum" as a reckless endeavor that played a role in Germany's military defeat during the Second World War. As the Wehrmacht began capturing vast swathes of territories in Eastern Europe during the early phase of the war, the bio-geo-political program of Lebensraum led to the intensification of self-destructive policies by Nazi military forces, culminating in the genocide of Jews, Romanis, Slavs, etc., and eventually, the collapse of Nazi Germany itself. Elucidating the self-destructive characteristics of Nazi practices, historian Vejas Liulevicius wrote:

"The regime used modern techniques for the goal of a terrible future utopia which classical modernity would not recognize, seeking space, rather than development. While the Soviets retreated, "trading space for time," the Nazis gave up time to gain space—seeking an everlasting, timeless present of destructive expansion in their vision of the Ostland. As the tide of events turned in the East, Hitler refused to give up the spaces conquered and forbade withdrawal again and again, producing military disasters. The ideological primacy of Raum was fatal in its consequences in the East. At long last, this was brought home to Germans as the Red Army invaded their territory by 1945, turning the utopia of Raum into a nightmare of the advancing East."

— "War Land on the Eastern Front" (2000),

== Contemporary usages ==
Since the end of World War II, the term Lebensraum has been used in relation to different countries, including China, Egypt, Israel, Turkey, Poland, and the United States.

== See also ==
- Spazio vitale, the territorial expansionist concept of Mussolini's Italian fascism
- Manifest Destiny, a 19th century expansionist concept of the United States
