= Wehrbauer =

Type of frontier settler in German-speaking countries

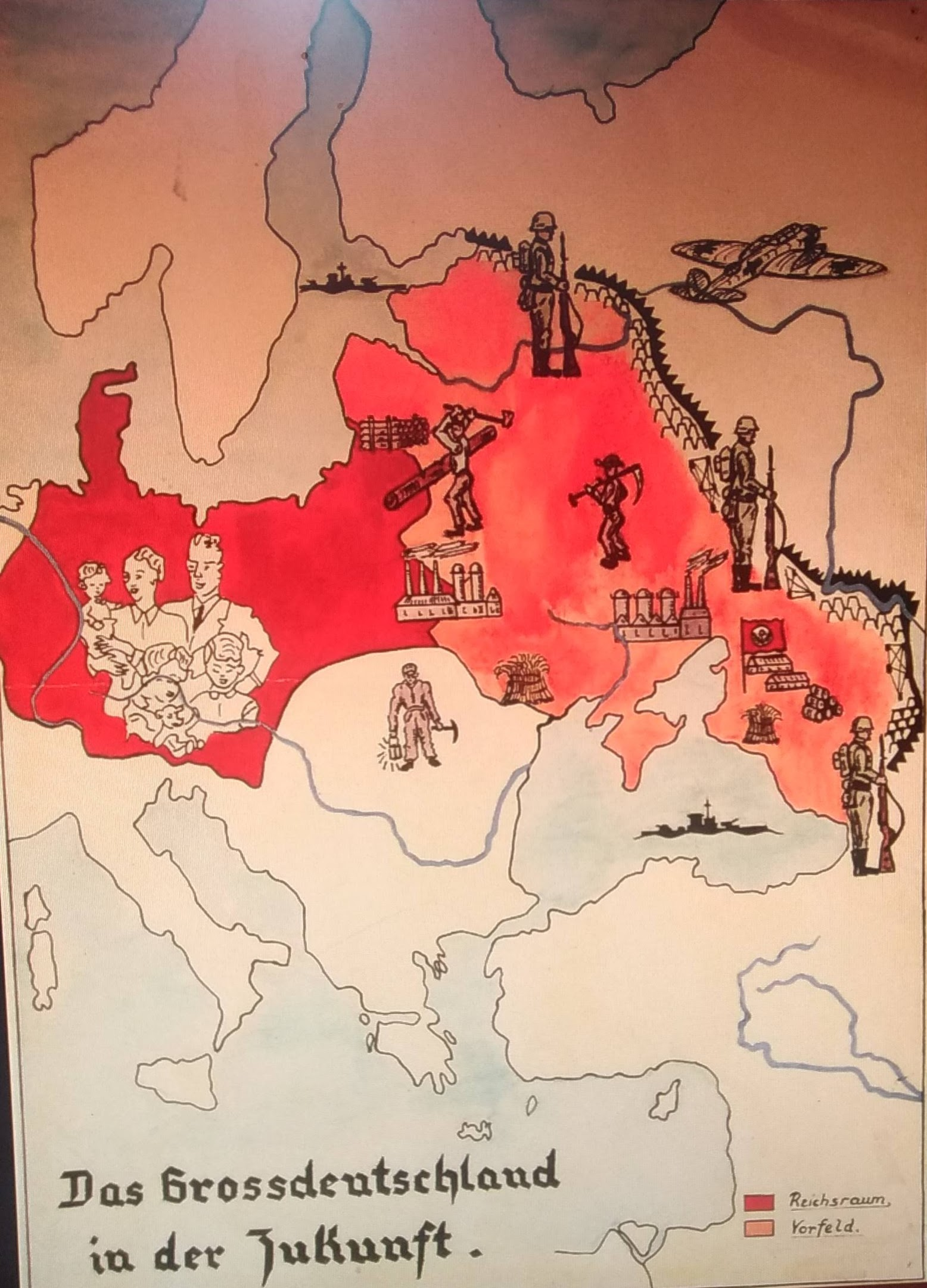
German colonisation of Eastern European regions as envisioned in a Nazi-era propaganda map published in 1943

Wehrbauer (German pronunciation: [ˈveːɐ̯ˌbaʊ.ɐ], lit. 'defensive peasant'; pl. Wehrbauern) is a German term for settlers living on the marches of a realm who were tasked with holding back foreign invaders until the arrival of proper military reinforcements. In turn, they were granted special liberties. Wehrbauern in their settlements, known as Wehrsiedlungen (-en being the plural suffix), were mainly used on the eastern fringes of the Holy Roman Empire and later Austria-Hungary to slow attacks by the Ottoman Empire. This historic term was resurrected and used by the Nazis during the Second World War.

== Etymology ==
The Habsburg use of "Wehrbauern" was the Military Frontier, which was established by Ferdinand I in the 16th century and placed under the jurisdiction of the Croatian Sabor and Croatian Ban since it was carved out of Croatian territory. It acted as a cordon sanitaire against Ottoman incursions. By the 19th century, it was rendered all but obsolete by the establishment of standing armies and was subsequently dissolved.

During the Thirty Years' War, battles and raids were common throughout its land, and the Holy Roman Empire had to make greater use of Wehrbauern in other regions of the empire as well.

In the 20th century, the term re-emerged and was used by the Nazi SS to refer to soldiers designated as settlers for the lands that were conquered during the German invasions of Poland and the Soviet Union.

== SS Wehrbauern ==
=== Ideology ===
The concept of Wehrbauern predated the Nazis, with the Artaman League (founded in 1923) sending urban German children to the countryside not only for the experience but also as a core of Wehrbauern.

The Nazis intended to colonise the conquered Eastern European lands in accordance with Adolf Hitler's Lebensraum ideology through such soldier peasants. Plans envisaged them acting both as colonists and as soldiers, defending the new German colonies from the surrounding Slavic population in the event of an insurgency. Wehrbauern would have the task not of extending civilization but of preventing it from arising outside Wehrbauer settlements. Any such civilisation, as a non-German phenomenon, would pose a challenge to Germany.

Beginning in 1938, the SS intensified the ideological indoctrination of the Hitler Youth Land Service (HJ-Landdienst) and promulgated its ideal of the German Wehrbauer. Special secondary schools were created under SS control to form a Nazi agrarian elite trained according to the principle of "blood and soil".

The SS plan for genocide and colonisation of the territories of eastern Poland and of the Soviet Union was titled Generalplan Ost (English: "General Plan East"). The plan projected the settlement of 10 million racially-valuable Germanics (Germans, Dutch, Flemish, Scandinavians, and English) in the territories over a span of 30 years and displacing about 30 million Slavs and Balts, who would be either slaves under German masters or forcefully transferred to Siberia to make room for the newcomers. Volksdeutsche, such as the Volga Germans, would also be transplanted. The German Foreign Ministry, however, suggested the alternative of moving the racially-unwanted population to Madagascar and Central Africa as soon as Germany had recovered its colonies, which had been lost by the 1919 Treaty of Versailles.

It's the greatest piece of colonisation the world will ever have seen linked with a noble and essential task, the protection of the Western world against an eruption from Asia. When he has accomplished that, the name of Adolf Hitler will be the greatest in Germanic history — and he has commissioned me to carry out the task.

— Heinrich Himmler

From a historical perspective, the SS Wehrbauer concept deliberately referenced the model of the military frontier held by the Habsburg monarchy against the incursions of the Ottoman Empire. Himmler also believed that during the early migration period and the German eastward expansion of the Middle Ages, the conquering Germanic peasant-farmer had, in addition to farming, defended his land with arms, and the Wehrbauer model aimed to revive that custom.

=== Settlement division ===
In the General Government, composed entirely of pre-war Polish territory, plans envisaged setting up a number of "settlement areas" (German: Siedlungsgebiete), centred on the six Teilräume ("spatial regions") of Cracow, Warsaw, Lublin, Lviv/Lwów (German: Lemberg), Bialystok, and Litzmannstadt (Polish: Łódź). The colonisation of former Soviet territories would take place through forming three major "settlement marches" (German: Siedlungsmarken), alternatively also called Reichsmarken ("marches of the Reich"). Smaller "settlement points" (German: Siedlungsstützpunkte), as well as a number of "settlement strings" (German: Siedlungsperlen, literally meaning "settlement pearls") were also envisaged in the east.

==== Siedlungsmarken ====
The settlement marches were to be separated from the civil administration of the Reich Ministry for the Occupied Eastern Territories and Reichskommissariats and given to the custody of the Reichsführer-SS, who was to name an SS and Police Leader (German: SS- und Polizeiführer) for the region and also to distribute temporary and inheritable fiefs and even permanent land ownership for the settlers.

In a time span of 25 years, the populations of Ingria (German: Ingermanland), the Memel-Narew region (the district of Bialystok and Western Lithuania) and southern Ukraine and the Crimean Peninsula (to be renamed Gotengau after the former Germanic tribe) were to become at least 50% German.

==== Siedlungsstützpunkte ====
In addition to the settlement marches, the SS planned to establish 36 settlement points. The population of these points was to be around 20–30% German. Marking the centre of each point, a planned German city of c. 20,000 inhabitants would be surrounded by closely-located German villages in a 5–10 km radius. The villages would secure the German control of all major road and railroad nodes.

==== Siedlungsperlen ====
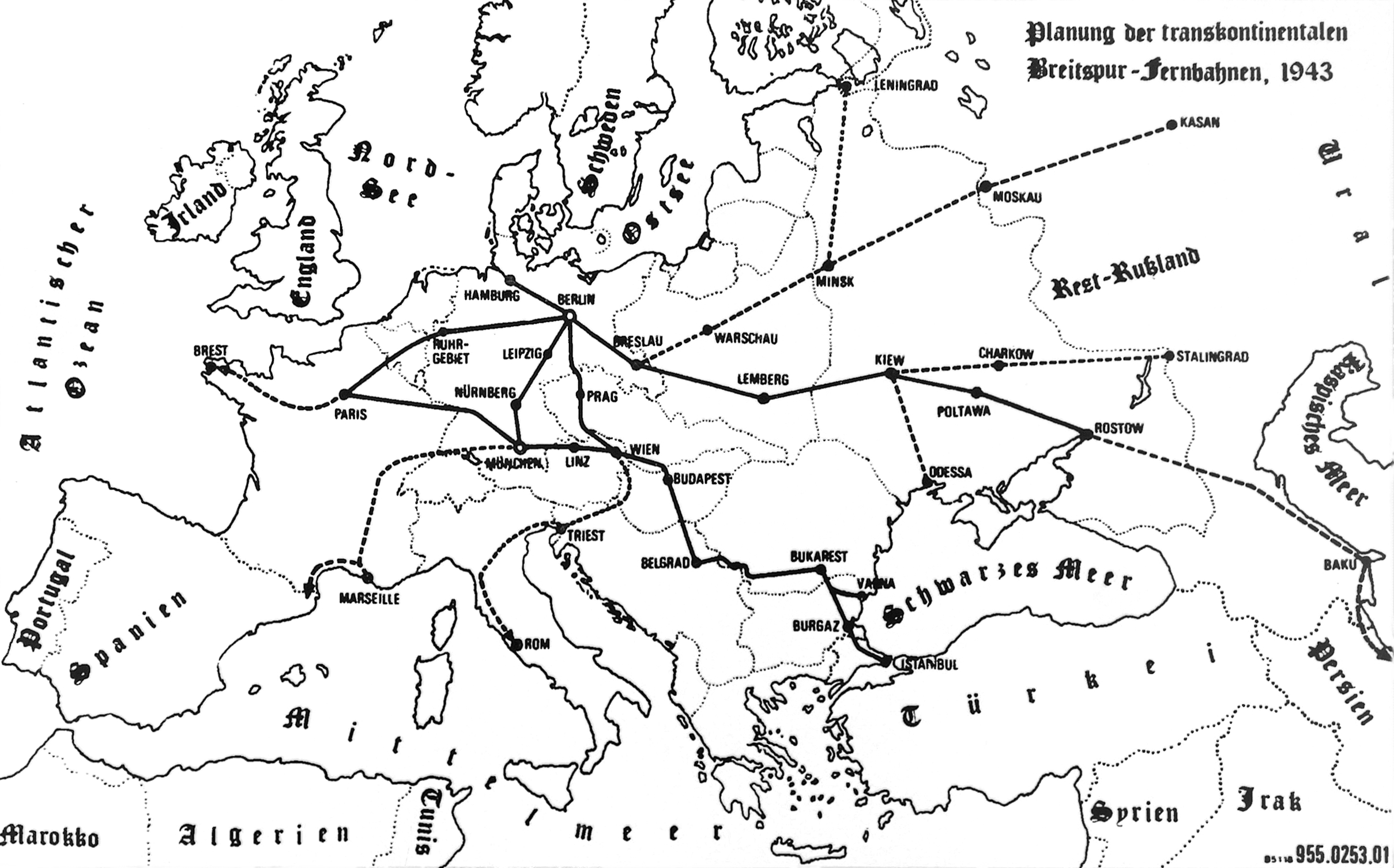
The planned Breitspurbahn rail network, with three proposed eastward railheads deep within Soviet territory

The settlement strings would follow the routes Cracow-Lviv-Zhitomir-Kiev, Leningrad-Mogilev-Kiev, and Zhitomir-Vinnitsa-Odessa (though Odessa came under the administration of Romania during the course of Operation Barbarossa in 1941). A major autobahn system would connect the settlement strings, with new German cities planned for construction along the roadbeds of roughly every 100 km. Further extensions run in the direction of the Don and the Volga, and eventually towards the Ural mountains. Plans for the extreme broad-gauge Breitspurbahn railway network proposed by the Nazis envisioned the railways having extensions running as far east as Kazan, Stalingrad, and Baku as possible railheads. Railways could provide another conceivable set of "strings" along which to place settlements.

=== Planned peasant-soldier community ===
The soldier-peasants would mainly be frontline veterans of the SS and members of the Allgemeine SS, who were to be supplied with weaponry for the armed defence of their respective communities. In October 1939, Himmler stated that the German settlements in Poland would be divided between different German cultural and linguistic subgroups such as Swabians, Franconians, Westphalians, and Lower Saxons.

The compulsory savings of the individual SS men would fund the foundation of the settlements. Each settlement was to be planned (Soviet villages emptied of their previous inhabitants were to be destroyed) and would comprise 30 to 40 farms, each of 121.5 hectares (300 acres); a Nazi Party headquarters; a manor house for the SS or party leader; an agricultural instruction centre; a house for a community nurse; and a cinema. The houses of the settlement were to be built "as in the old days" - two or three stone courses thick. Baths and showers were to be available in every house.

The SS calculated the exact amount of weaponry for delivery to each individual soldier-peasant. An SS or NSDAP leader of merit, chosen for his qualities as a man and a soldier, would occupy the manor. That individual would become the leader (German: Leiter) of the settlement and act on the administrative side as a Burgomeister and on the party side as the political leader of the local group, effectively combining the jurisdictions of the party and the state. He would also act as the military commander of a company-sized force consisting of the community's peasants, their sons, and labourers.

The plans for the Wehrbauer communities did not include provision for any churches, unlike medieval farming villages. Himmler stated that if the clergy were to acquire money to construct churches on their own in the settlements, the SS would later take the buildings over and transform them into "Germanic holy places".

During one of his many private-dinner monologues, Hitler presented his vision of the soldier-peasant. After twelve years of military service, soldiers from peasant families would receive completely-equipped farms located in the conquered East. The last two years of their military service would focus on agricultural education. The soldier was not to be allowed to marry a townswoman but only a peasant woman who, if possible, had not begun to live in a town with him. That would enable the settlers to live out the blood-and-soil principles of Nazi Germany. It would also encourage large families. Thus, Hitler stated, "we shall again find in the countryside the blessing of numerous families. Whereas the present law of rural inheritance dispossesses the younger sons, in the future every peasant's son will be sure of having his patch of ground". Hitler also believed that former non-commissioned officers would make ideal teachers for the primary schools of the utopian communities. Although Himmler wanted the settlements to be totally agrarian, Hitler planned to introduce certain types of small-scale industry to them. At the time of his 54th birthday in April 1943, the Führer had a discussion with Albert Speer and Karl-Otto Saur on a design he had personally drawn up for a six-person bunker that was to be used in the Atlantic Wall, featuring machine guns, an anti-tank gun, and flamethrowers. The design was also to be used for defence purposes on Germany's "ultimate eastern border deep within Russia", where the easternmost Wehrbauer "settlement-pearl" villages would likely have grown up if the Axis powers had completely defeated the Soviets. There might have been the possibility either of remnant Soviet forces or of troops of the northwestern Siberian extremities of Imperial Japan's Co-Prosperity Sphere territories on the eastern side of such a frontier.

== See also ==
=== Non Nazi-related context ===
Europe

  - Allotment system, Sweden
- Cossacks
- March (territory)
- Szekely, Magyar group from Transylvania
- Transylvanian Saxons
  - Burzenland in Transylvania
  - Gyepű, in the history of Hungary, uncultivated strips of land serving as border protection buffer zone inhabited with armed settlers, often local tribes

Asia

- Tondenhei, 19th-century military border settlers of Japan
- Xinjiang Production and Construction Corps, China

=== Nazi context ===
- Blood and soil
- Greater Germanic Reich
- Hegewald
- New Order
- Reichskommissariat Ostland
- Reichskommissariat Ukraine
- Zamość uprising
