= Emmerthal =

- Municipality
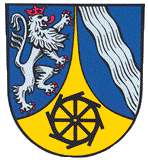
- Coat of arms

- Location of Emmerthal within Hameln-Pyrmont district
- Interactive map of Emmerthal
- Location within Germany Location within Lower Saxony
- Coordinates: 52°3′N 9°23′E
- Country: Germany
- State: Lower Saxony
- District: Hameln-Pyrmont

Government
  - Mayor (2021–26): Dominik Petters (SPD)

Area
  - Total: 114.94 km^{2} (44.38 sq mi)
- Elevation: 69 m (226 ft)

Population (2025-12-31)
  - Total: 9,723
  - Density: 84.59/km^{2} (219.1/sq mi)
- Time zone: UTC+01:00 (CET)
  - Summer (DST): UTC+02:00 (CEST)
- Postal codes: 31860
- Dialling codes: 05155, 05157, 05286, 05151
- Vehicle registration: HM
- Website: www.emmerthal.de

Emmerthal (German pronunciation: [ˈɛmɐˌtaːl]) is a municipality in the Hameln-Pyrmont district, in Lower Saxony, Germany. It is situated on the river Weser, approximatively 6 km south of Hameln. Its seat is in the village Kirchohsen.

In 1973, the Emmerthal was formed by merging the previously independent municipalities of Amelgatzen, Bessinghausen, Börry, Brockensen, Emmern, Esperde, Frenke, Grohnde, Hagenohsen, Hajen, Hämelschenburg, Kirchohsen, Latferde, Lüntorf, Ohr, Voremberg, Welsede.

The Grohnde Nuclear Power Plant is located in the Emmerthal.

From 1933 to 1937, the National Socialists held their national thanksgiving festival in a field on the nearby Bückeberg hill.
