= Willibald Hentschel =

German activist (1858–1947)

- Born: Willibald Hentschel; 7 November 1858; Łódź, Congress Poland
- Died: 2 February 1947 (aged 88); Berg, Upper Bavaria, Germany
- Education: University of Jena
- Occupation: Dye chemist
- Notable work: Varuna (1901); Mittgart (1904)
- Political party: German Social Party

Willibald Hentschel (7 November 1858 – 2 February 1947) was a German writer and political agitator of the agrarian and volkisch movement. He sought to renew the Aryan race through a variety of schemes, including selective breeding and polygamy, all within a firmly rural setting.

== Early life and education ==
Willibald Hentschel was born in Łódź, Congress Poland in 1858. His father was a textile factory owner from Burgenstein (Bohemia).

In 1874 he moved to Dresden, where he graduated from high school in 1875 and began to study chemistry and physics. In 1877 he moved to Jena, where he studied biology at the University of Jena. For his doctorate he studied under celebrated Darwinist Ernst Haeckel.

== Career ==
After his PhD Hentschel initially remained an assistant with Haeckel, then returned to the Technische Hochschule Dresden, where he was involved with chemist Rudolf Schmitt in developing a new process to produce salicylic acid. In 1885/1886 Hentschel participated in an expedition to East Africa. After his return, he worked as a chemist at the University of Jena, University of Leipzig and University of Heidelberg.

He used his knowledge to patent an indigo dye, earning a fortune which enabled him to buy two knightly estates in Silesia and concentrate his efforts on political ventures. Starting in 1882, Hentschel was involved in antisemitic organisations in Dresden like the "Deutsche Reform", the "Dresdner Reformverein" and was an agitator for the "Deutscher Reform-Verein". Since 1887 he wrote for the "Antisemitische Correspondenz", where he published antifeminist articles on human breeding ideals. He was a co-founder of the German Social Party in 1889, an anti-Semitic group led by Max Liebermann von Sonnenberg.

In 1901 he published the book Varuna, in which he explored the supposed origins of the Aryan race, which made him a popular figure on the far right. In this book he argued that history was driven by the process of racial purification and the energy and spirit that drove this desire. In 1903, Hentschel founded the anti-Semitic journal Hammer together with Theodor Fritsch. Fritsch announced that Varuna, which complained that Germans were becoming "Semitized" through such initiatives as democratisation and rural depopulation, was the ideological basis of the new journal.

=== Publication of Mittgart, 1904 ===
In 1904 Hentschel published the book Mittgart in which he outlined a scheme to send 1000 ethnically pure women and 100 men picked for their military and athletic prowess to large country estates to procreate. Their children would then leave the estates at the age of 16 with the aim of travelling Germany and renewing racial stock. He argued that in time the countryside would be the only place were pure Germans would be found, with the cities housing the biologically unfit who would die away quickly. Hentschel's scheme attracted criticism not only from religious leaders but also from fellow racial nationalists who were outraged by what they saw as an attack on the institution of the family. Hentschel for his part was an atheist and belonged to the tendency within German nationalism that was strongly opposed to Christianity. Despite the criticism he founded his own Mittgart-Bund to publicise his idea and even attempted to start his colony in Lower Saxony although this scheme met with little success and had been abandoned before 1914.

=== World War I ===
Before and during WWI Hentschel worked in Radebeul and Schreckenstein. During and after World War I, Hentschel’s stocks became worthless.

=== Interbellum, 1918–1938 ===
After World War I he moderated his ideas somewhat, calling instead for a migration of ethnic Germans into the east of the country in order to displace the Poles living there. Hentschel called for these Germans to be Artamanen, a portmanteau word he created from art and manen, Middle High German words meaning 'agriculture man' and indicating his desire for a retreat from urban life to an idyllic rural past. His vision inspired the creation of the Artaman League youth movement in which the likes of Heinrich Himmler and Richard Walther Darré were active.

On 1 August 1929, Hentschel joined the Nazi Party as member number 144,649 although, whilst his ideas about eugenics were influential on Nazism as an ideology, he had no real influence in the party personally.

== Personal life and death ==
Hentschel was married with Hellen Zimmermann and had five daughters. After 1890 he lived on his estate in Seiffersdorf in Silesia, today Radomierz, municipality Janowice Wielkie. He died 1947 in Berg, Upper Bavaria.

== Legacy ==
Hentschel had many followers, including his teacher Ernst Haeckel, who shared his views on racial hygiene. Other admirers were Erich Ludendorff and Adolf Hitler, who congratulated the Hentschel couple on the occasion of their diamond wedding anniversary, even though Hentschel had left the NSDAP in 1941. In addition to the ethnic ideas, as expressed in the Lebensborn, Hentschel’s influence on National Socialism consisted above all in the enforcement of the Hitler salute which he initiated.

== See also ==
- Varuna
