= Artaman League =

German Interbellum ruralist movement

Artaman League Artamanen-Gesellschaft
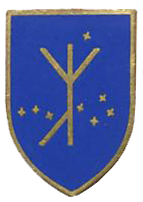
- Leader: Georg Kenstler
- Notable members: Heinrich Himmler; Rudolf Höss; Walter Granzow
- Founded: 1923
- Dissolved: 7 October 1934
- Merged into: Hitler Youth
- Ideology: Volkisch nationalism; Agrarianism; Eugenics; Anti-communism; Anti-capitalism; Anti-Slavism; Racial antisemitism
- Political position: Far-right

The Artaman League (German language: Artamanen-Gesellschaft) was a German agrarian and völkisch movement committed to a Back-to-the-land–inspired ruralism, founded in 1923. Active during the inter-war period, the League became closely linked to, and eventually absorbed by, the Nazi Party.

== Etymology ==
The agrarian Willibald Hentschel (1858–1947) coined the term Artamanen before the First World War of 1914–1918. A believer in racial purity, Hentschel founded his own group, the Mittgart Society, in 1906. The word Artamanen compounded art and manen, Middle High German words meaning "agriculture man" and indicating Hentschell's desire to see Germans retreat from the decadence of the city in order to return to an imagined idyllic rural past.

== Origins ==
The Artaman League had its roots in the overall Lebensreform movement in late 19th-century and early 20th-century Germany. This movement encompassed hundreds of groups throughout Germany that were involved in various experiments tied to ecology, health, fitness, vegetarianism, and naturism (Nacktkultur). These groups held positions across the political spectrum. The Antisemitic groups ultimately gained a following among the Nazi Party members and their supporters. Publications by right wing Lebensreformists, which sold in the tens of thousands, argued that their practices were "the means by which the German race would regenerate itself and ultimately prevail over its neighbours and the diabolical Jews who were intent on injecting putrefying agents into the nation's blood and soil".

== Development ==
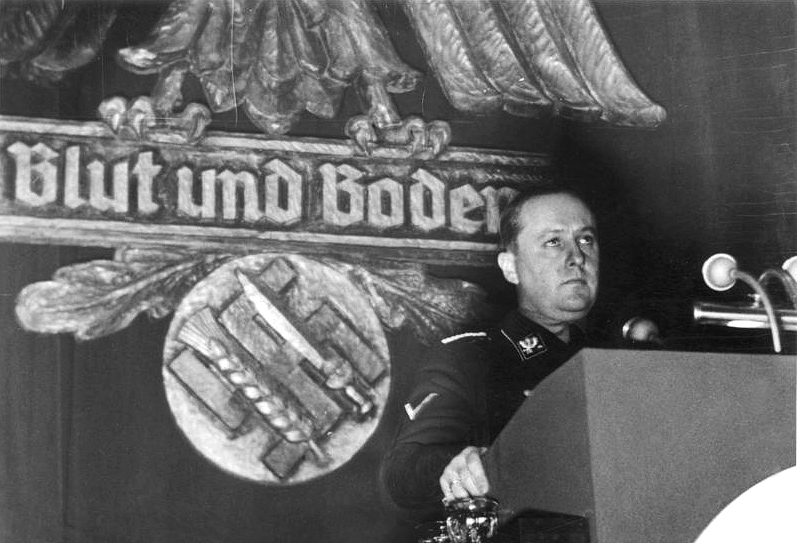
Walther Darré speaking at a Reichsnährstand assembly under the slogan 'Blut und Boden' (blood and soil) in Goslar, 1937

Although Hentschel had developed his ideas before World War I, the Artaman League first formed in 1923. The Artamans formed part of the German Youth Movement, representing its more right-wing back-to-the-land elements. Under the leadership of Georg Kenstler they advocated blood-and-soil policies with a strong undercurrent of anti-Slavism. This völkisch movement believed that the decline of the Aryan race could only be halted by encouraging people to abandon city life in favour of settling in the rural areas in the east. Whilst members wished to perform agricultural labour as an alternative to military service, they also saw it as part of their duty to violently oppose Slavs and to drive them out of Germany. The concepts were combined in the figure of the Wehrbauer, or soldier-peasant. Accordingly, the League sent German youth to work on the land in Saxony and in East Prussia in an attempt to prevent these areas being settled by Poles. To this end 2000 settlers were sent to Saxony in 1924 – both to work on farms and to serve as an anti-Slav militia. They also gave classes on the importance of racial purity and the Nordic race, and on the corrupting influence of city living and of Jews.

Like many similar right-wing youth movements in Germany, the Artaman League lost impetus as the Nazi Party grew. By 1927, 80% of its membership had become Nazis. The League had disappeared by the early 1930s, with most of its membership having switched to the Nazis.

== Nazi links ==
Heinrich Himmler in 1945

As the situation deteriorated in the late 1920s, some of the Artamans were drawn deeper into politics, and engaged in a holy war against their enemies: liberals, democrats, Free-Masons and Jews. Eventually many members of the Artaman League turned to Nazism. Heinrich Himmler was an early member and held the position of Gauführer in Bavaria. Whilst a member of the League, Himmler met Richard Walther Darré and the two struck up a close friendship, based largely on Darré's highly developed ideological notions of blood and soil to which Himmler was attracted. The Artaman vision would continue to have a profound effect on Himmler who, throughout his time as Reichsführer-SS, retained his early dreams of a racially pure peasantry. Himmler was also close to his fellow member Rudolf Höss and would later advance him in the Schutzstaffel due in part to their history in the Artaman League. The small league was dismantled and incorporated into the Hitler Jugend in October 1934 as the Nazi youth movement gained strength.

== Legacy ==
The development of a number of environmentalist groups and projects in Germany with extreme right wing politics has recently gained media attention. Since the 1990s, third-position environmentalists have taken advantage of cheap farmland made available by the post-Cold War reunification of East and West Germany, establishing themselves in Mecklenburg, "in an effort to reinvigorate the traditions of the Artaman League". The state government of Rhineland-Palatinate has published a booklet titled Nature Conservation vs Rightwing Extremism in an effort to assist organic farmers who may encounter rightwing extremists. Gudrun Heinrich of the University of Rostock has published a study, Brown Ecologists, in reference to both the current movement and the Nazi Brownshirts. The politically extreme rightwing environmental magazine Umwelt und Aktiv (Environment and Active), is believed to receive support from Germany's third-position National Democratic Party (NPD). Der Spiegel has covered the "organic brown fellowship" ("Braune Bio-Kameradschaft"), and Süddeutsche Zeitung has published an article on the “infiltration [Unterwanderung] of organic farming by rightwing extremists, noting the lineage to Nazi doctrines of Aryan supremacy and ecological harmony.

== See also ==
- German Society for Racial Hygiene
- Nazi eugenics
- Blood and soil
- Varuna (1901)
- Willibald Hentschel
- Thule Society
