= Reich Harvest Thanksgiving Festival =

Annual German festival 1933- 1937

Coordinates: 52.0547°N 9.4014°E

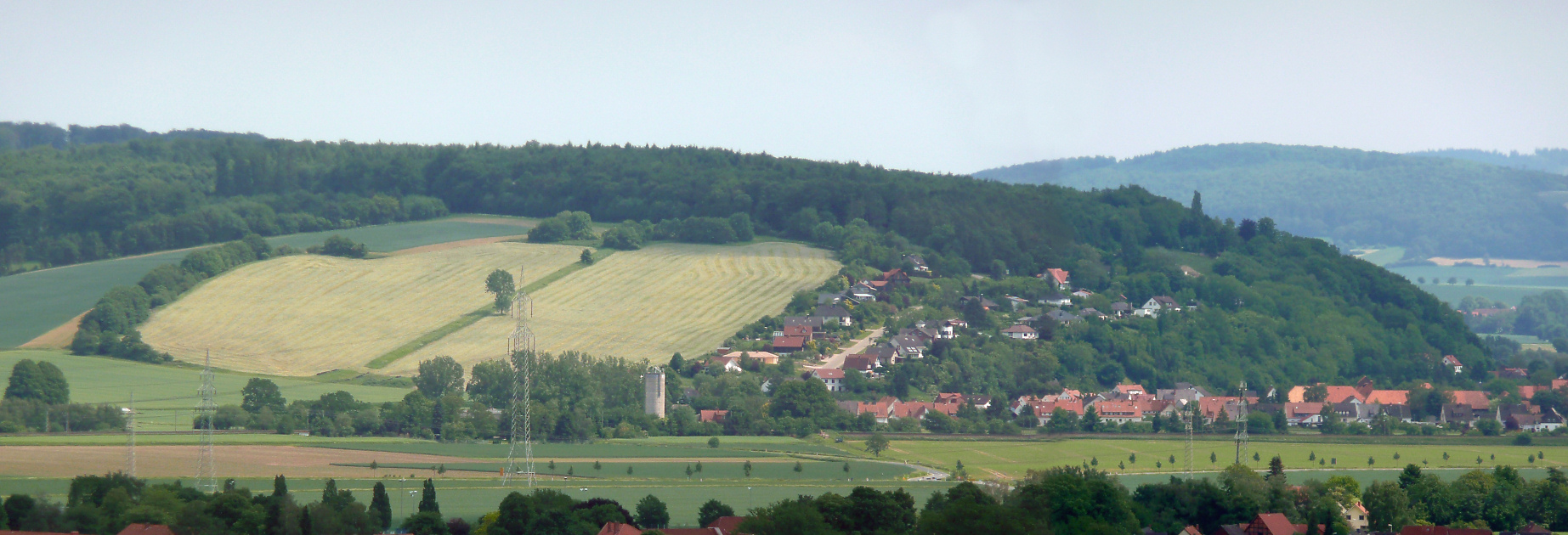
The festival grounds

The Reich Harvest Thanksgiving Festival (German: Das Reichserntedankfest) was a monumental Nazi German celebration of the peasantry and the German farmers. The festivals ran from 1933 to 1937 on the Bückeberg, a hill near the town of Hamelin. Most festivals occurred every October, with the 1934 festival commencing 30 September. The official purpose of the festival was the recognition of the achievements of the German farmers, whom the Nazis called the Reichsnährstand (the Reich's Food Estate). The celebration was also used by the Nazis as a propaganda tool to showcase the connection between Führer Adolf Hitler and the German people. The festival was part of a cycle of Nazi celebrations which included the annual party rally at Nuremberg, Hitler's birthday celebrations and other important events on the Nazi calendar.

In 1937, the festival was attended by about 1.2 million people, culminating with Hitler walking through the Führerweg (Führer's way) to the harvest monument, in the form of an altar, to receive the harvest crown from the Farmers' Estate on behalf of the German people. The festival was attended by more people than any other Nazi ceremony or ritual activity, including the party rally at Nuremberg.

In addition to its agricultural theme, the festival was used by the Nazis to increase the contact of the Führer with the masses and to demonstrate the Reich's military prowess. From 1935, the Wehrmacht staged mock battles at the festival with the participation of up to 10,000 soldiers, airplanes and panzers. In 1933, during his inaugural speech at the festival, Hitler announced the passage of a new law, the Reichserbhofgesetz, the State Hereditary Farm Law, which provided safeguards for the integrity of ownership of some family farms.

== Ideological background ==
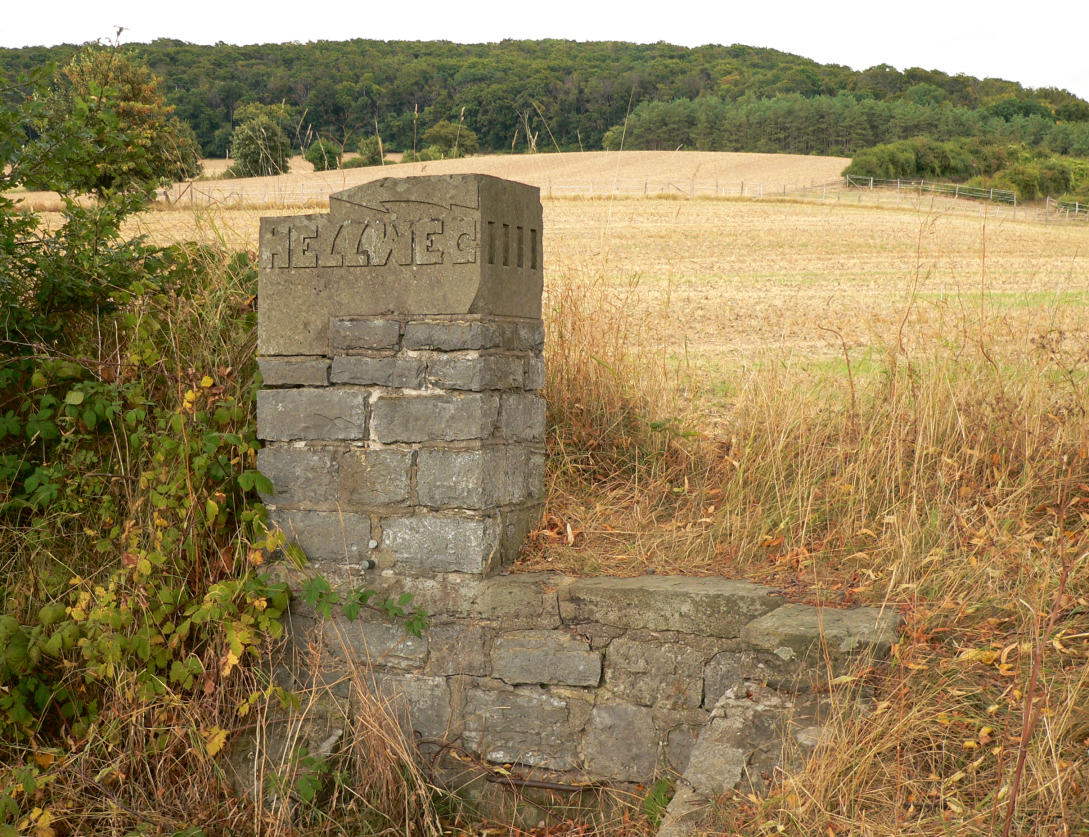
A stone on festival grounds

The ideological underpinnings of the Reich Harvest Thanksgiving Festival were provided by Richard Walther Darré's ideas of "Blood and Soil". Darré, known as the "Reich Peasant Leader", viewed a future Germany as a Bauernreich, a Peasant Empire, in which the German farmers played a vital role, as Germany expanded by conquering new lands through the expansionist policy of Lebensraum.

The German peasants, although generally unaware of the theories advanced by Darré, reacted positively to the Nazis description of them as Landsvolk (the people of the land) and Nährstand (the nurturing class) and supported the Nazis by attending the harvest festivals dedicated to their contributions to Nazi society. Das Reichserntedankfest was the most important agricultural festival and was staged at Bückeberg, a hill located near the town of Hamelin. The festival was originally a religious celebration for a good harvest season. Darré described it as "[the day when] the Germanic unity of peasant soil, and creator are recognised as the most holy symbol of the connection between the Germanic people and the soil".

== Location ==
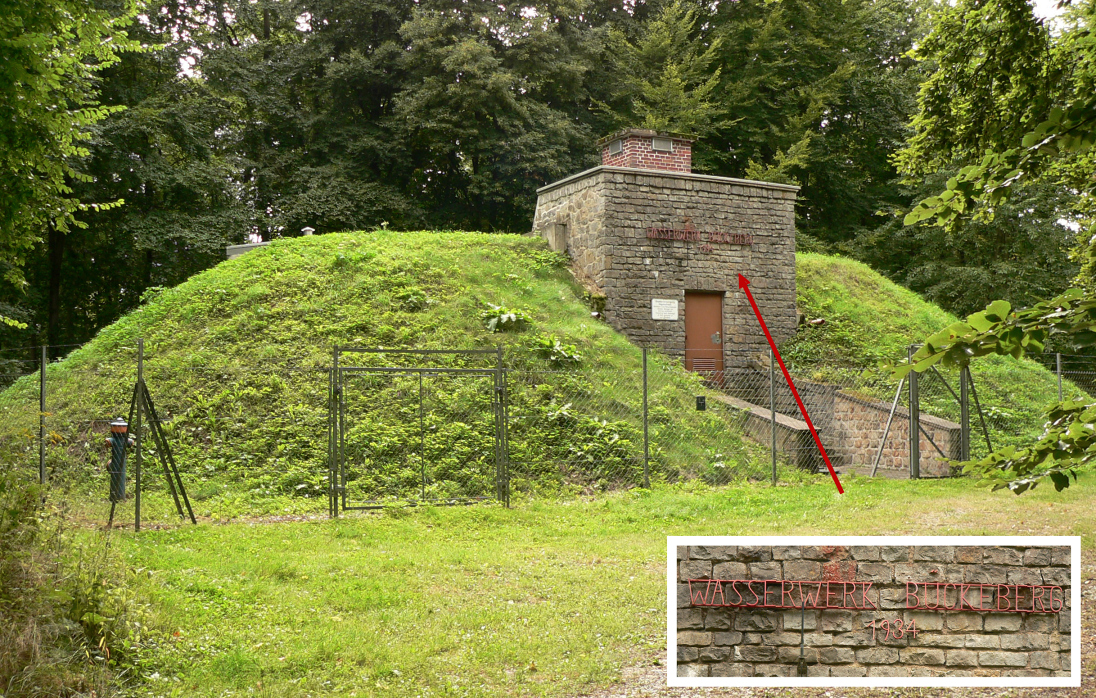
A water reservoir from 1934

The location of the hill near Hamelin was chosen for political, historical and infrastructural reasons. Hamelin, a town in Lower Saxony, was an urban centre which had the infrastructure to support mass gatherings of such size. In addition, Nazi support in the region was high. The Nazis also made frequent mentions of the historic struggles of the Germanic tribes which had settled the area. The nearby Weser River was referred to as the "most German of all rivers". The Weser region was also significant for the Nazis, and appealed to their mysticism, because it was believed that it was there that Arminius had defeated the Romans and Saxon leader Widukin had defeated Charlemagne's army.

== Construction ==
Joseph Goebbels chose Albert Speer as the designer of the grounds. The initial design of the place opted for simplicity to better reflect the rural roots of the celebration. Two stages were erected which were connected by a long corridor. A circular area featuring thousands of flagpoles was also constructed. The inaugural celebrations in 1933 were met with success and this led Goebbels to the idea of converting the grounds to a "Germanic cult place" (Reichsthingstätte). Additions included a monument which "was to last for eternity", construction of new roads, renovations of existing train stations and the construction of a new Führerbahnhof which was Hitler's own train station purpose-built for his arrival during the celebrations. The new design was also created by Speer.

== Celebrations ==
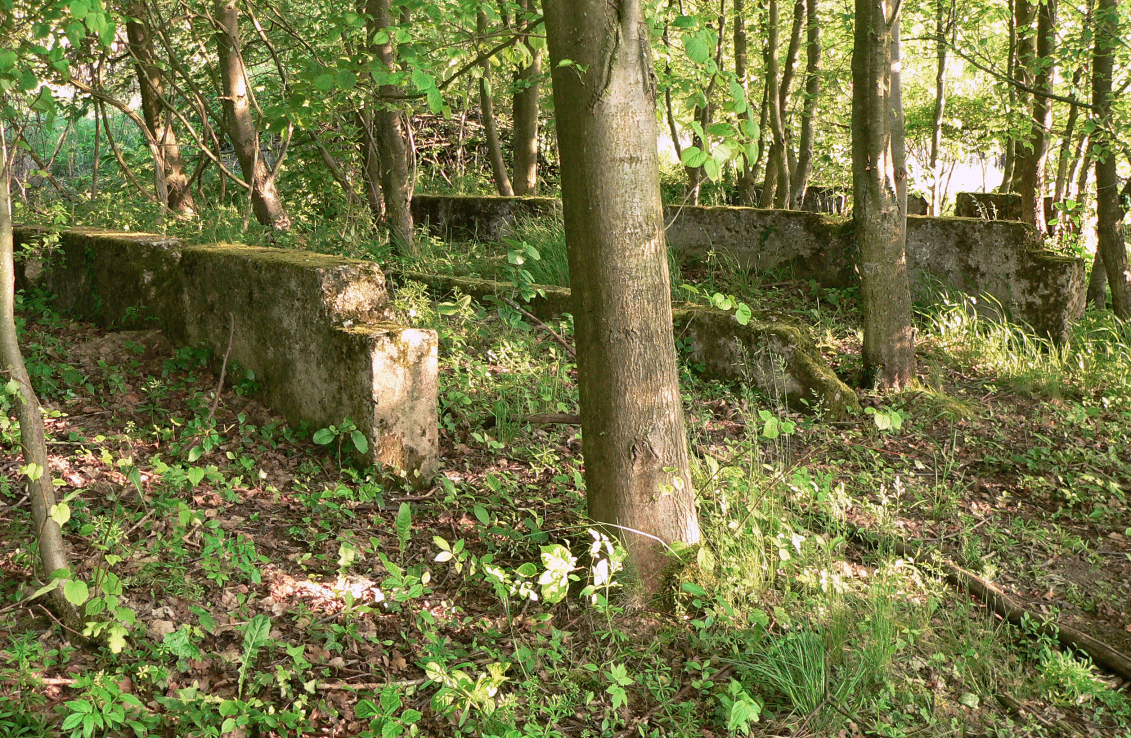
Ruins of the rostrum

As part of the celebrations, choirs consisting of thousands of singers sang nationalist anthems while pictures of distinguished farmers were distributed to the crowds. The most anticipated moment of the celebration was the arrival of the Führer at noon, followed by Hitler walking on the Führerweg (Führer's way) toward the monument where a peasant woman at the altar awarded him the harvest crown. The 600-metre procession took Hitler 45 minutes to complete due to frequent stops to meet and greet the crowd.

Bridges spanning the Weser river were constructed and used in mock battles with the participation of panzers and airplanes and a force of about 10,000 men, also featuring an attack on the Bückerdorf. In 1935, the attendance of the peasants at the festival fell due to their dissatisfaction with the policies of the Nazi party and the enactment of the Entailed Farm Law. The same year, a mock village was built on the hill. The village was the target of bombing by the air force and panzers and was eventually destroyed. On 3 October 1937, Hitler during his address at the festival called on Britain to be "reasonable" and threatened to seek colonies. In 1935, Göring, Goebbels and Rudolf Hess followed Hitler as he was greeting people while walking on the Führerweg.

In 1938, most of the preparations for the festival were finalised when the plans were abruptly cancelled due to logistical problems caused by the pending invasion of Czechoslovakia by Germany which necessitated the use of trains to move military materiel to the border rather than transporting peasants to Bückeberg to attend the celebrations.

=== Displays ===
Since the celebrations were close to the nearby town of Hamelin, known for the fairy tale of the Pied Piper of Hamelin, images were distributed during the Harvest Festival showing the children of Hamelin carrying Nazi flags and following the piper. The displayed propaganda toys and images also signified the intention of the regime to affect all stages of one's life from "cradle to grave".

== Preservation and legacy ==
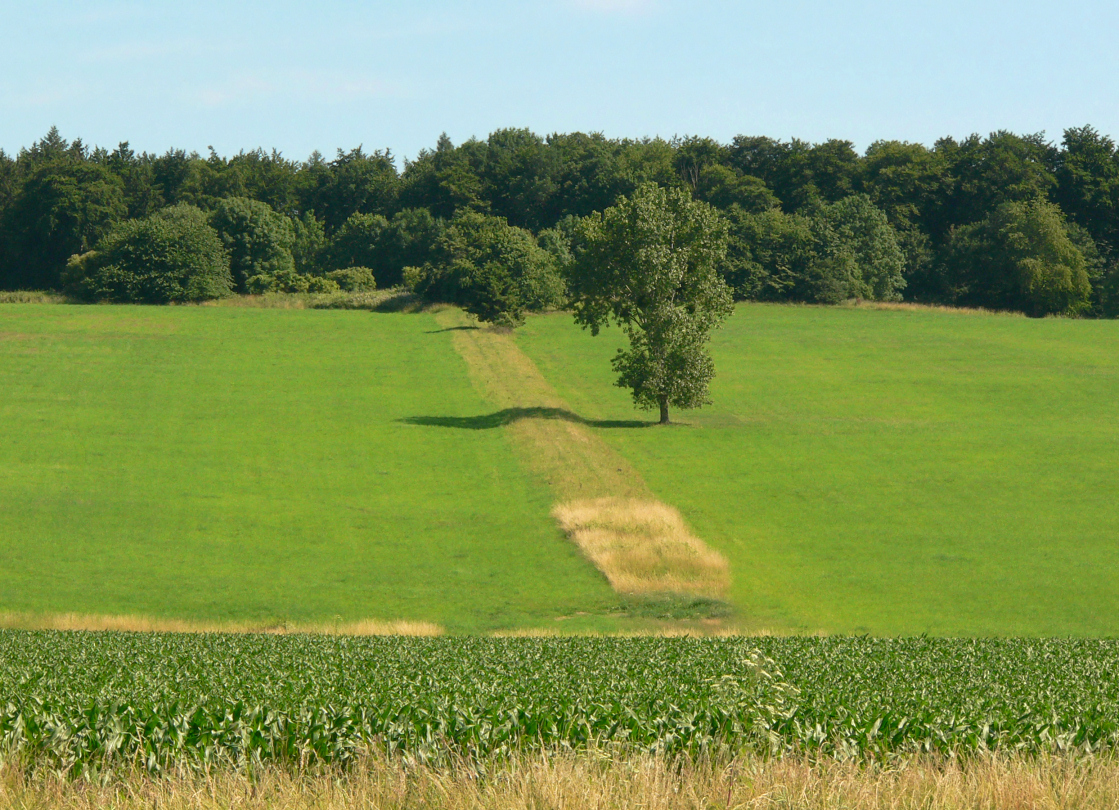
The remains of the Führerweg (Führer's way) appear as a long line of grass visible on the hillside.

In modern times, the site appears to be just a green area with trees, with little evidence of its Nazi past. However, upon closer inspection, architectural elements of its past can be discerned, chief among them the Führerweg, which now appears as a long line of grass clearly visible on the hillside. There are also other remnants such as rostrum ruins and other infrastructure. The site was one of the most important celebrations of the Reich and within it the Führerweg, an elevated paved corridor 600 metres long and 5 metres wide, was at the centre of the festivities, designed to showcase, in a ritual way, the closeness between the Führer and the people.

Given the significance of the site to Nazi history and the large numbers of people who gathered in the area during the festivities, the historical importance of the grounds is not in doubt. However it has not been declared a historic site and its preservation as a historic place has been a difficult problem for modern German authorities. This is partly due to fears that if the location is declared historical, it will become a pilgrimage site for neo-Nazis. Another reason, frequently raised by local authorities, is the refusal of local people to be associated with a celebration closely tied to the Nazis.

In 2008, graffiti appeared on the grounds stating "Kein Denkmal Den Tätern. Gedenkt Der Opfer!" translating as "No commemoration of the perpetrators. Commemorate the victims!"
