= Adolf Hitler's 50th birthday =

National holiday in Nazi Germany

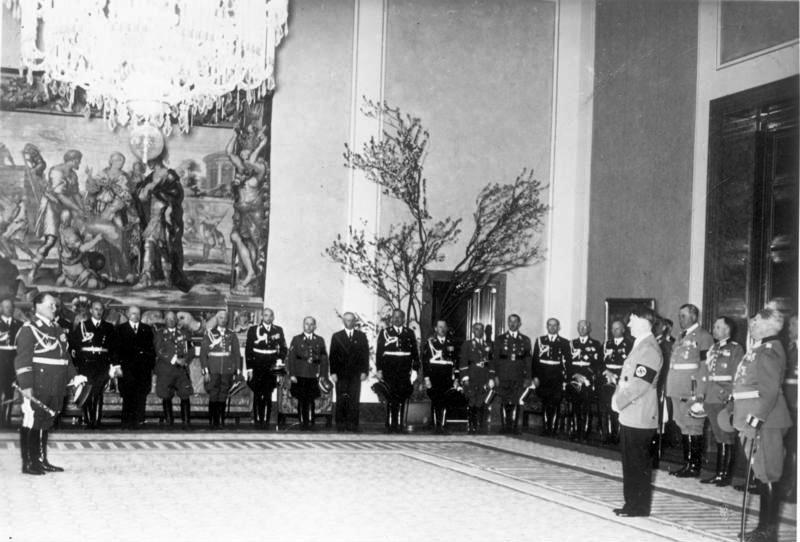
German government officials congratulating Hitler at the Reichskanzlei in Berlin

Adolf Hitler's 50th birthday was celebrated as a national holiday throughout Nazi Germany on 20 April 1939. Minister of Propaganda Joseph Goebbels made sure the events organised in Berlin were a lavish spectacle focusing on Hitler himself. The festivities included a military parade with some 40,000 to 50,000 German troops taking part, along with 162 Luftwaffe airplanes flying overhead. The parade was intended in part as a warning to the Allied powers of Nazi Germany's military capabilities. The parade lasted for more than four hours, with 20,000 official guests, along with several hundred thousand spectators being present.

== Celebrations ==
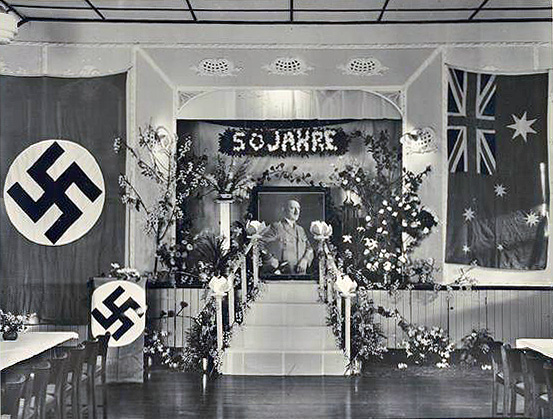
Celebration of Hitler's 50th birthday in a German club in Australia

On 18 April 1939, the German government declared that Adolf Hitler's birthday (20 April) was to be a national holiday. Festivities took place in all municipalities throughout the country as well as in the Free City of Danzig. British historian Ian Kershaw comments that the events organised in Berlin by Propaganda Minister Joseph Goebbels were "an astonishing extravaganza of the Führer cult. The lavish outpourings of adulation and sycophancy surpassed those of any previous Führer Birthdays".

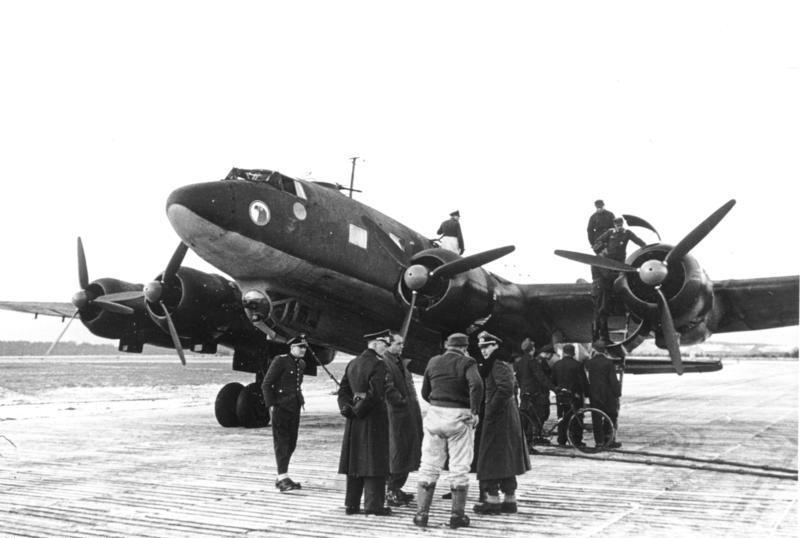
Hitler's personal Fw 200 Condor

Festivities began in the afternoon on the day before his birthday, when Hitler rode in the lead car of a motorcade of fifty white limousines along architect Albert Speer's newly-completed East-West Axis, the central boulevard for planned Welthauptstadt Germania, which was to be the new name for a renovated Berlin after the victory in World War II. Hitler, anticipating that Speer would give a speech, was amused when he evaded that by briefly announcing that the work should speak for itself. The next event was a torch-lit procession of delegations from all over Germany, which Hitler reviewed from a balcony in the Reich Chancellery. Then, at midnight, Hitler's courtiers congratulated him and presented him with gifts, including "statues, bronze casts, Meissen porcelain, oil-paintings, tapestries, rare coins, antique weapons, and a mass of other presents, many of them kitsch. Hitler admired some, made fun of others, and ignored most".

Speer presented Hitler with a scale model of the gigantic triumphal arch planned for the rebuilding of Berlin, and Hitler's pilot, Hans Baur, gave him a model of the "Führer plane", a four-engined Focke-Wulf Fw 200 Condor that went into service later that year as Hitler's official airplane.

== Military parade ==
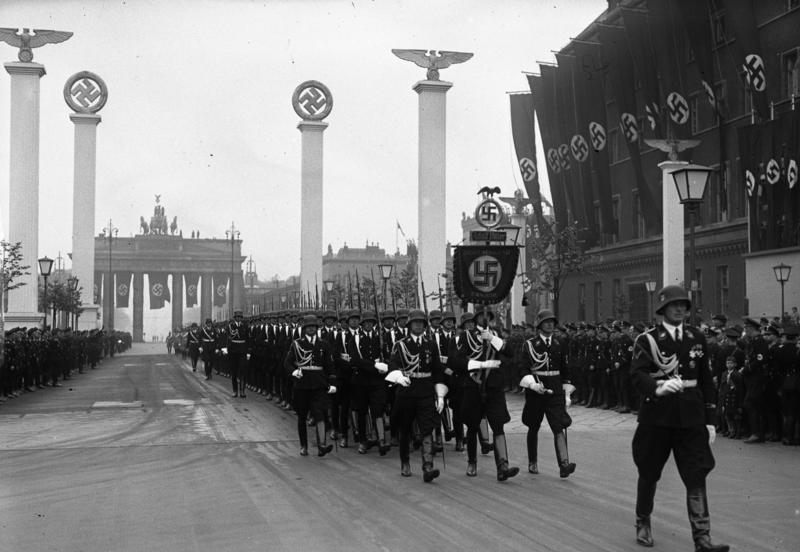
Soldiers of the Leibstandarte SS Adolf Hitler marching through Berlin during the military parade

A key part of the birthday celebrations was the large demonstration of Nazi Germany's military capabilities. The display was intended in part as a warning to the Western powers. The parade, which lasted for more than four hours, included 12 companies of the Luftwaffe, 12 companies of the army, and 12 companies of the navy and units of the Schutzstaffel (SS). In total, 40,000 to 50,000 German troops took part. 162 warplanes also flew over Berlin. The grandstand comprised 20,000 official guests, and the parade was watched by several hundred thousand spectators. Features of the parade were large long-range air-defence artillery guns, emphasis on motorised artillery, and the development of air-defence units. Joseph Goebbels declared in a broadcast address to the German people:

The Reich stands in the shadow of the German sword. Trade and industry, and cultural and national life flourish under the guarantee of the military forces. The name of Herr Hitler is our political programme. Imagination and realism are harmoniously combined in the Führer.

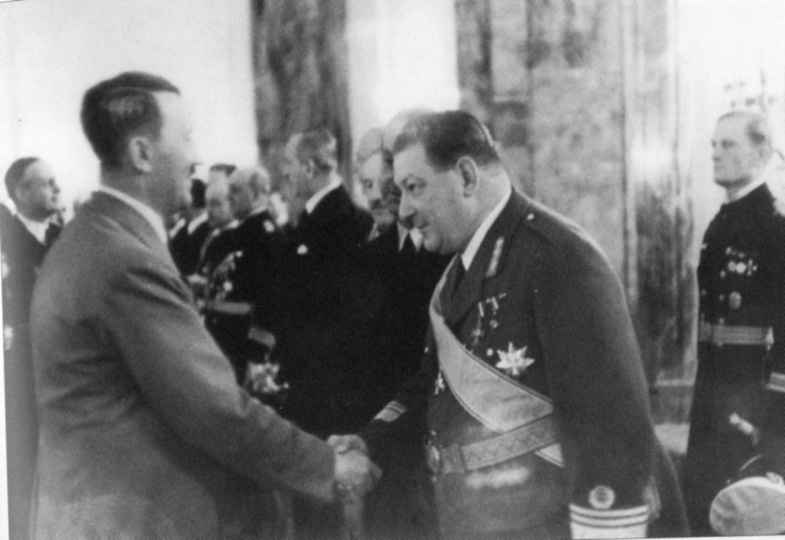
Estonian Defence Minister Nikolai Reek congratulating Hitler

Military leaders throughout the country gave addresses to their troops to celebrate the occasion. Some, such as Major General (later Generalfeldmarschall) Erich von Manstein, were especially effusive in their praise for their supreme commander. Official guests representing 23 countries took part in the celebrations. Papal Nuncio Cesare Orsenigo, Slovak State President Jozef Tiso, the heads of the branches of Nazi Germany's armed forces and mayors of German cities offered birthday congratulations at the chancellery. Hitler and the Italian dictator, Benito Mussolini, exchanged telegrams that assuring each other that the friendship between Germany and Italy, both of which were ruled by fascist regimes, could not be disturbed by their enemies. The ambassadors of the United Kingdom, France, and the United States were not present at the parade since they had been withdrawn after Germany had occupied Czechoslovakia in 1938. The U.S. was represented at the troop review by the chargé d'affaires, Raymond H. Geist. U.S. President Franklin D. Roosevelt did not congratulate Hitler on his birthday, in accordance with his practice of not sending birthday greetings to anyone but ruling monarchs. British King George VI dispatched a message of congratulation to Hitler, but the strained relations between the two countries made his advisors consider whether he should ignore the birthday altogether.

There was no Polish representation at the parade.

== Commemoration ==
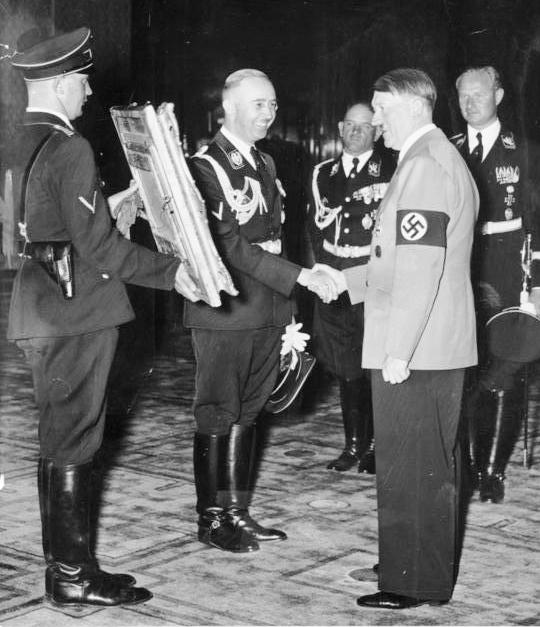
Reichsführer-SS Heinrich Himmler presenting Hitler with a gift

A luxury edition of Hitler's political manifesto and autobiography, Mein Kampf, was published in 1939 in honour of his 50th birthday and was known as the Jubiläumsausgabe ("Anniversary Issue"). It came in both dark blue and sharp red boards with a gold sword on the cover. German author and photographer Heinrich Hoffmann wrote a book about Hitler's 50th birthday, Ein Volk ehrt seinen Führer ("A Nation Honours its Leader"). Composer Hans Rehberg wrote a hymn for the occasion. A film of the birthday celebration, Hitlers 50. Geburtstag ("Hitler's 50th Birthday"), is regarded as an important example of Nazi propaganda and was subsequently shown to packed audiences at Youth Film Hours, which were held on Sundays.

== Birthday gifts ==
The Free City of Danzig made Hitler an honorary citizen of the city as a birthday gift. Hitler received the citizenship papers from the hands of Albert Forster, the city's Nazi leader. Political and military tension between Germany and Poland was heightened at the time, and Time reported the possibility of Danzig being returned to Germany. Because of his indigestion, Hitler did not drink alcohol and so a Munich brewery created a special batch of low-alcohol beer for his birthday. The brew then became a regular order.

== See also ==
- Holidays in Nazi Germany

== Sources ==
=== Printed ===
- Hoffmann, Hilmar (1997). The Triumph of Propaganda: Film and National Socialism, 1933–1945. Berghahn Books. ISBN 978-1-57181-122-6.
- Kershaw, Ian (2000). Hitler: 1936–1945: Nemesis. Norton Publishing. ISBN 978-0-393-32252-1.
- Speer, Albert (1970). Inside the Third Reich. Orion Books. ISBN 978-1-84212-735-3.
- Stein, Marcel (2007). Field Marshal Von Manstein: The Janushead – A Portrait. Helion & Company. ISBN 978-1-906033-02-6.
- Sterling, Christopher (2008). Military Communications: From Ancient Times to the 21st Century. ABC-CLIO. ISBN 978-1-85109-732-6.

=== Online ===
- "1,500,000 Watch Parade As Nazis Celebrate". Pittsburgh Press. 20 April 1939.
- "Adolf Hitler". Life. 25 September 1939.
- "Germany: Aggrandizer's Anniversary". Time. 1 May 1939.
- "Foreign News: Birthday Present?". Time. 24 April 1939. Archived from the original on December 14, 2008.
- "George VI Sends Hitler Congratulatory Message". Pittsburgh Press. 20 April 1939.
- "Hitler, Duce Repledge Aid". The Prescott Evening Courier. 21 April 1939.
- "Hitler Holds Great Display of Militarism". San Jose Evening News. 20 April 1941.
- "Hitler Proudly Parades Big Guns at Celebration". The Miami Daily News. 20 April 1939.
- "Luxury Edition of Mein Kampf Honors Hitler". Evening Independent. 21 April 1939.
- "Nazi Play Revived". The Jerusalem Post. 18 November 2003. Archived from the original on June 4, 2011.
- "Roosevelt Will Not Congratulate Hitler". The Norwalk Hour. 20 April 1939.
- "Wo Hitler Schwindlig Wurde [Where Hitler Was Dizzy]". Der Tagesspiegel (in German). 21 October 1939.
- "Worship of Hitler". The Age. 21 April 1939.
