= Markus Pieper =

German politician and member of the European Parliament (born 1963)

Markus Pieper MEP
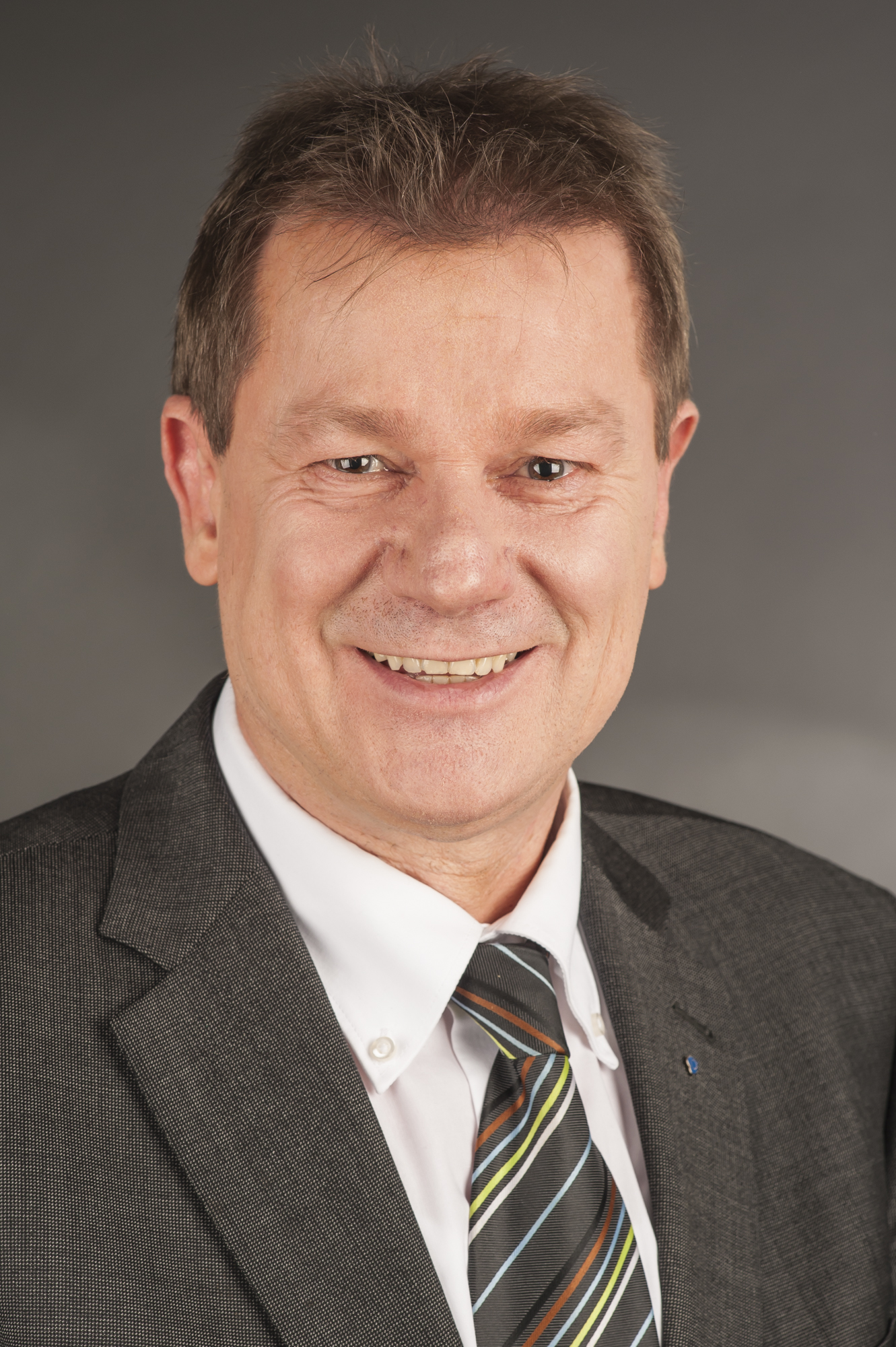

Member of the European Parliament
- Incumbent
- Assumed office 1 July 2004
- Constituency: Germany

Personal details
- Born: 15 May 1963 (age 63) Hamelin, West Germany
- Party: German: Christian Democratic Union; EU: European People's Party
- Education: Leibniz University Hannover; University of Göttingen
- Website: www.markus-pieper.eu

Markus Pieper (born 15 May 1963) is a German politician and member of the European Parliament for Germany. He is a member of the Christian Democratic Union, part of the European People's Party.

== Member of the European Parliament, 2004–present ==
Pieper serves on the Committee on Transport and Tourism and on the Committee on Industry, Research and Energy.

In 2014, Pieper drafted a resolution of the European Parliament calling for more stringent impact assessments before EU legislation is proposed. The resolution, passed with a large majority, backed an idea set out in the Stoiber ‘red tape report’ – drawn up by a high-level group chaired by Edmund Stoiber, former Minister-President of Bavaria – calling for the creation of a high-level advisory body on better regulation. Since 2021, he has been leading the parliament’s work on the revision of the Renewable Energy Directive.

In addition to his committee assignments, Pieper has been a member of the European Parliament Intergroup on Biodiversity, Countryside, Hunting and Recreational Fisheries since 2014.

In 2024, Pieper was appointed by the European Commission as EU small and medium-sized enterprises (SME) Envoy, reporting directly to President Ursula von der Leyen and to the European Commissioner for Internal Market Thierry Breton. His appointment over two qualified women caused "the most serious internal rebellion von der Leyen has faced since she first became head of the EU's executive branch back in 2019", according to Politico.eu.

== Other activities ==
- Energy and Climate Policy and Innovation Council (EPICO), Member of the Advisory Board (since 2021)
- Max Planck Institute for Molecular Biomedicine, Member of the Board of Trustees
