= Reichserbhofgesetz =

Law regarding farm ownership in Nazi Germany

The Reichserbhofgesetz, the Hereditary Farm Law, of 1933 was a Nazi law to implement principles of blood and soil, stating that its aim was to: "preserve the farming community as the blood-source of the German people". As farmers appeared in Nazi ideology as a source of economics and racial stability, the law was implemented to protect them from the forces of modernization.

== Conditions ==
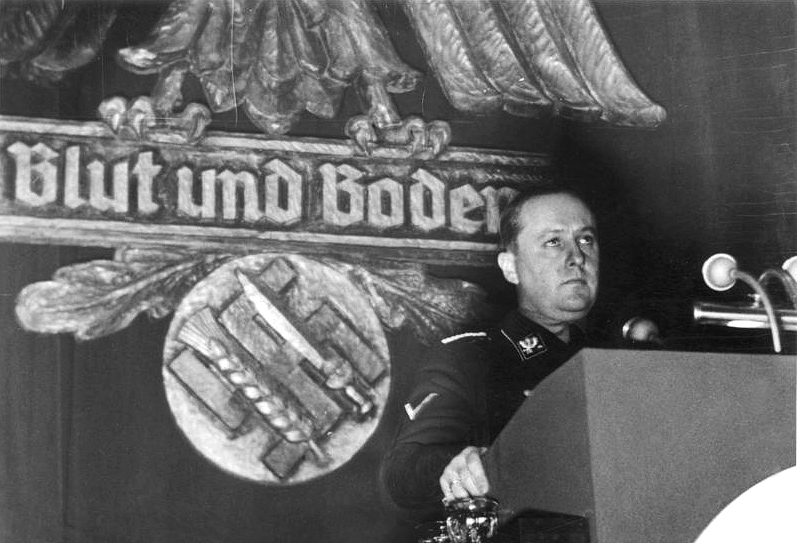
Walther Darré speaking at a Reich Food Society (Reichsnährstand) assembly under the slogan Blut und Boden, Blood and Soil, in Goslar, 1937

Any farm of at least one Ackernahrung, an area of land large enough to support a family and evaluated from 7.5 to 125 hectares (19–309 acres), was declared a Hereditary farm (Erbhof), to pass from father to son, without the possibility to be mortgaged or alienated. Only those peasants were entitled to call themselves "farmers" (Bauern), a term the Nazis attempted to refurbish from a neutral or even pejorative to a positive term.

A Greater Aryan certificate was required to receive its benefits, similar to the requirements for becoming a member of the Nazi Party.

Farms too small could become an Hereditary farm by combination, and larger farms would have to be subdivided.

== Transmission ==
Regional custom was allowed to decide only whether the eldest or the youngest son was to be the heir. In regions in which no particular custom prevailed, the youngest son was to be the heir. Still, the eldest son inherited the farm in most cases during the Third Reich. Priority was given to the patriline and so if there were no sons, brothers and their sons of the deceased peasant had precedence over the peasant's own daughters.

Only about 35% of all farming units were covered by the law, and landed estates in East Elbia were not affected by it.

Richard Walther Darré, in accordance with his strong "blood and soil" beliefs, did much to promote the law as the Reich Minister of Food and Agriculture and Reichsbauernführer.

== Suppression ==
In Allied-occupied Germany, after much debate about whether this law should be repealed for its Nazi roots or if it should be kept for the moment, after excising its most odious clauses, to protect the German food supply, in 1947 the Allied Control Council decided to repeal it and to regulate the transfer of forests and farms. On the occasion, other entailments were also repealed.

== See also ==
- Fee tail
- Blood and Soil
- Ultimogeniture
- Primogeniture
- Serfdom
