= Holidays in Nazi Germany =

Holidays in Nazi Germany were primarily centred on important political events, serving as a form of political education and reinforcing propaganda themes. Major national holidays were therefore controlled by Joseph Goebbels at the Reich Propaganda Ministry, and were often accompanied by mass meetings, parades, speeches and radio broadcasts.

Many of the official national holidays in the Third Reich were anniversaries of political events, namely the seizure of power (January 30), the announcement of the Nazi Party program in 1920 (24 February), Hitler's birthday (20 April) and the Beer Hall Putsch (9 November). Others were traditional German holidays. Heroes' Memorial Day was celebrated on 16 March, National Labour Day on 1 May, Mother's Day in May, Summer Solstice in June, Harvest Thanksgiving in Autumn and Winter Solstice in December.

From 1937, Jews were banned from the streets during German public holidays.

Holiday	Local name	Date
New Year's Day	Neujahr	1 January
Heroes' Memorial Day	Heldengedenktag	16 March if it was a Sunday, otherwise the Sunday before 16 March (marking the renouncing of the disarmament clauses of the Treaty of Versailles and re-introduction of conscription on 16 March 1935).	from 1939, the 5th Sunday before Easter (Reminiscere)
Good Friday	Karfreitag	Easter Sunday - 2 days
Easter Monday	Ostermontag	Easter Sunday + 1 day
Birthday of the Führer	Führergeburtstag	20 April	celebrated from 1933 to 1944, declared national holiday for Hitler's 50th birthday in 1939
Labour Day	Nationaler Feiertag des deutschen Volkes	1 May	from 1934. Introduced in 1933 as "Feiertag der nationalen Arbeit"
Ascension Day	Christi Himmelfahrt	Easter Sunday + 39 days
Whit Monday	Pfingstmontag	Easter Sunday + 50 days
Corpus Christi	Fronleichnam	Easter Sunday + 60 days	only in municipalities with predominantly Catholic population
Harvest Festival	Erntedanktag	1st Sunday after Michaelistag (29 September)
Reformation Day	Reformationstag	31 October	only in municipalities with predominantly Protestant population
Memorial Day for the Martyrs of the movement	Gedenktag für die Gefallenen der Bewegung	9 November. Commemorated Nazis who had died in political violence, especially the Beer Hall Putsch (8–9 November 1923).	from 1939
Day of Repentance and Prayer	Buß- und Bettag	Wednesday before 23 November
Christmas Eve	Weihnachtsabend	24 December
Christmas Day	1. Weihnachtsfeiertag	25 December
Saint Stephen's Day / Boxing Day	2. Weihnachtsfeiertag	26 December

== See also ==
- Public holidays in Germany
