= Bückeberg (Hagenohsen) =

Hill in Lower Saxony, Germany

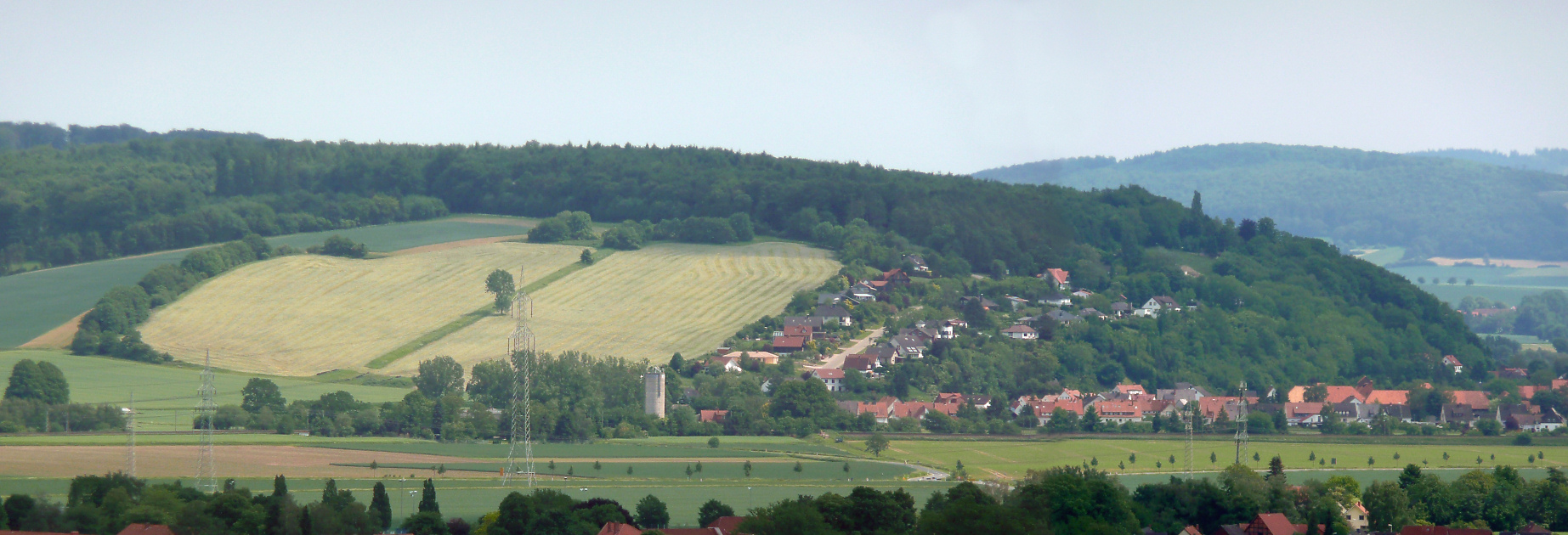
The Bückeberg with the mown fields of the former site of the Third Reich Harvest Festivals (Reichserntedankfeste)

The Bückeberg (German pronunciation: [ˈbʏkəˌbɛʁk]; 160 m) is a hill that lies south of Hamelin on the eastern perimeter of the Weser village of Hagenohsen which is on the right-hand, eastern bank of the River Weser in central Germany.

The crest and the other slopes of the Bückeberg are covered with mixed forest. From the Weser village of Latferde further south a local road runs over the Bückeberg to Hagenohsen. From 1933 to 1937 the Reich Harvest Thanksgiving Festival held by the Nazis took place on a large, artificially-levelled field on the western side of the Bückeberg. The municipality of Emmerthal has put forward a land use plan for the terrain of the Reich harvest festival.
