= Hamelin =

Hamelin Hameln
- Town
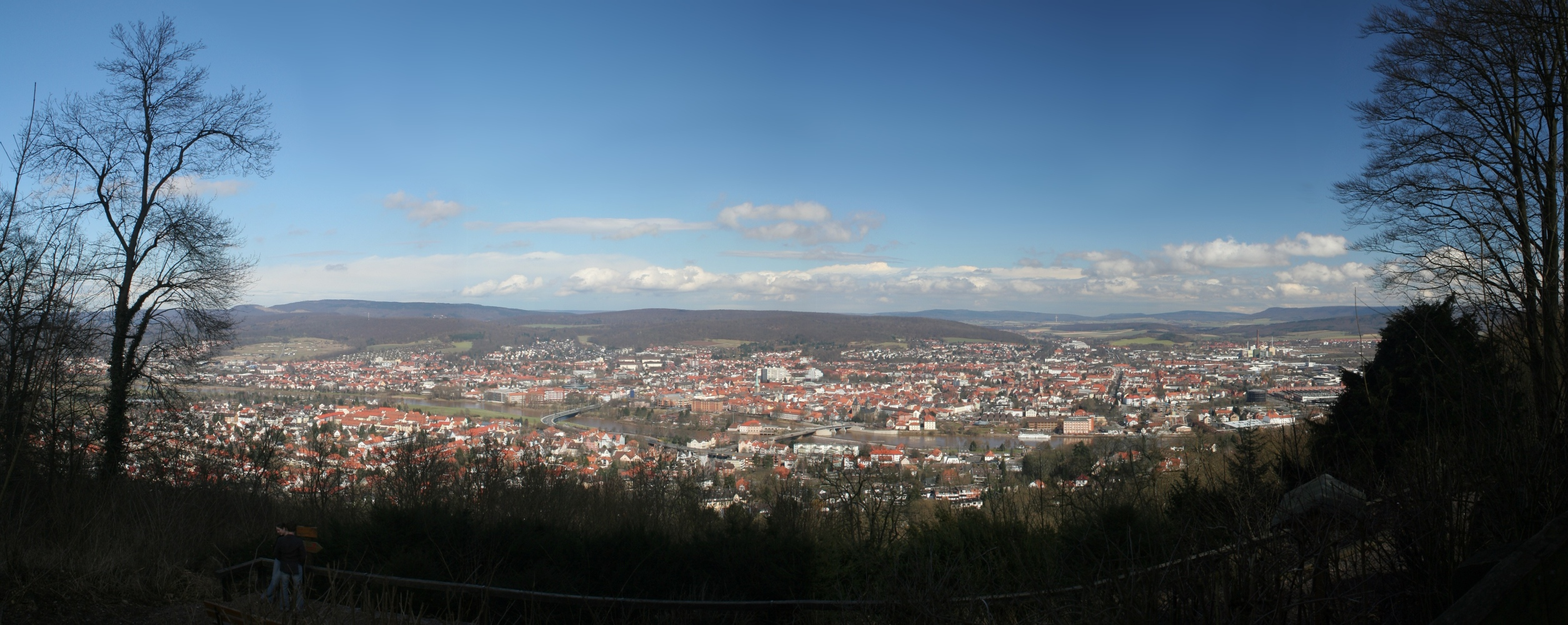
- Panorama of Hamelin

- Coat of arms

- Location of Hamelin within Hameln-Pyrmont district
- Interactive map of Hamelin
- Location within Germany Location within Lower Saxony
- Coordinates: 52°6′N 9°22′E
- Country: Germany
- State: Lower Saxony
- District: Hameln-Pyrmont

Government
  - Mayor (2021–26): Claudio Griese (CDU)

Area
  - Total: 102.53 km^{2} (39.59 sq mi)
- Elevation: 68 m (223 ft)

Population (2025-12-31)
  - Total: 58,152
  - Density: 567.17/km^{2} (1,469.0/sq mi)
- Time zone: UTC+01:00 (CET)
  - Summer (DST): UTC+02:00 (CEST)
- Postal codes: 31785–89, 3250
- Dialling codes: 05151
- Vehicle registration: HM
- Website: www.hameln.de

Hamelin (/ˈhæməlɪn/ HAM-əl-in; German: Hameln [ˈhaːml̩n]) is a town on the river Weser in Lower Saxony, Germany. It is the capital of the district of Hameln-Pyrmont and has a population of roughly 57,000. Hamelin is best known for the tale of the Pied Piper of Hamelin.

== History ==
Hamelin started with a monastery, which was founded as early as 851 AD; its surrounding village became a town by the 12th century. The incident involving the "Pied Piper" (see below) is said to have occurred in 1284 and may be based on a true event, although somewhat different from the traditional tale. In the 15th and 16th centuries, Hamelin was a minor member of the Hanseatic League.

In June 1634, during the Thirty Years' War, Lothar Dietrich, Freiherr of Bönninghausen, a general in the Imperial Army of the Holy Roman Emperor, lost the Battle of Oldendorf to the Swedish General Kniphausen, after Hamelin had been besieged by the Swedish army.

The era of the town's greatest prosperity began in 1664, when Hamelin became a fortified border town of the Principality of Calenberg. In 1705, it became part of the newly created Electorate of Hanover when George Louis, Prince of Calenberg, later King George I of Great Britain, inherited the Principality of Lüneburg.

Hamelin was surrounded by four fortresses, which gave it the nickname "Gibraltar of the North", and was the most heavily fortified town in the Electorate of Hanover. The first fort (Fort George) was built between 1760 and 1763, the second (Fort Wilhelm) in 1774, a third in 1784, and the last, called Fort Luise, was built in 1806.

In 1806, Hamelin surrendered without a fight to the French forces, after Napoleon's victory at the Battle of Jena-Auerstedt. Napoleon's forces subsequently pulled down the town's historic walls, the guard towers, and the three fortresses at the other side of the river Weser. In 1843, the people of Hamelin built a sightseeing tower on the Klüt Hill out of the ruins of Fort George. The tower is called the Klütturm and is a popular sight for tourists.

In 1867 Hamelin became part of the Kingdom of Prussia, which annexed Hanover in the aftermath of the Austro-Prussian War of 1866.

Between 1933 and 1937, the Nazi regime held the Reich Harvest Thanksgiving Festival at the nearby Bückeberg hill, to celebrate the achievements of Germany's farmers.

During World War II, Hamelin Prison was used for the detention of Social Democrats, Communists, and other political prisoners. Around 200 died there, and more died in April 1945, when the Nazis sent the prisoners on long marches, fearing the Allied advance. Just after the war, Hamelin prison was used by British Occupation Forces for the detention of Germans accused of war crimes. Following their conviction, around 200 were hanged there, including Irma Grese and Josef Kramer, along with over a dozen of the perpetrators of the Stalag Luft III murders. The prison has since been turned into a hotel. Executed war criminals were interred in the prison yard until it became full, and further burials took place at the Am Wehl Cemetery in Hamelin. In March 1954, German authorities began exhuming the 91 bodies from the prison yard, which were reburied in individual graves in consecrated ground in Am Wehl Cemetery.

The coat of arms (German: Wappen) of Hamelin depicts the Minster of St. Boniface, the oldest church in the city.

== Geography ==
=== Subdivisions ===
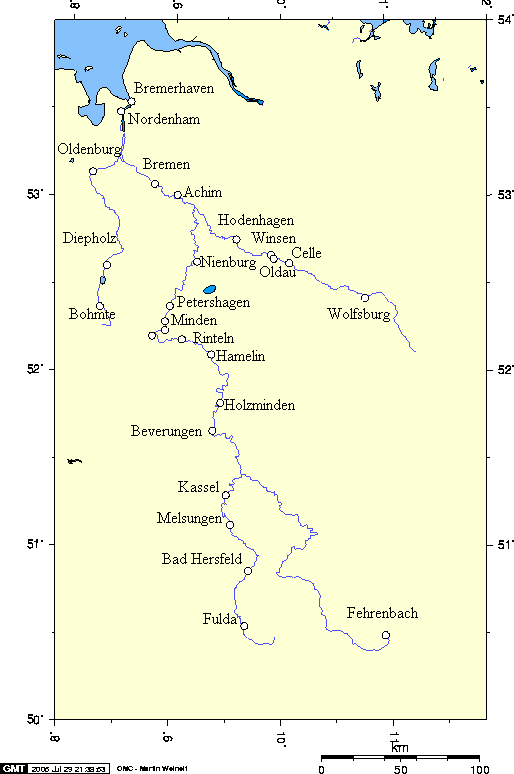
Watershed of the river Weser

- Nordstadt
- Südstadt
- West/Klütviertel
- Ost/Basberg
- Mitte/Altstadt
- Wehl
- Afferde
- Hastenbeck
- Halvestorf (Halvestorf, Bannensiek, Weidehohl and Hope)
- Haverbeck
- Hilligsfeld (Groß und Klein Hilligsfeld)
- Sünteltal (Holtensen, Unsen, Welliehausen)
- Klein Berkel / Wangelist
- Tündern
- Wehrbergen
- Rohrsen

== Demographics ==
Year	Inhabitants
1689	2,398
1825	5,326
1905	21,385
1939	32,000
1968	48,787
2005	58,872
2018	57,510

== Attractions ==
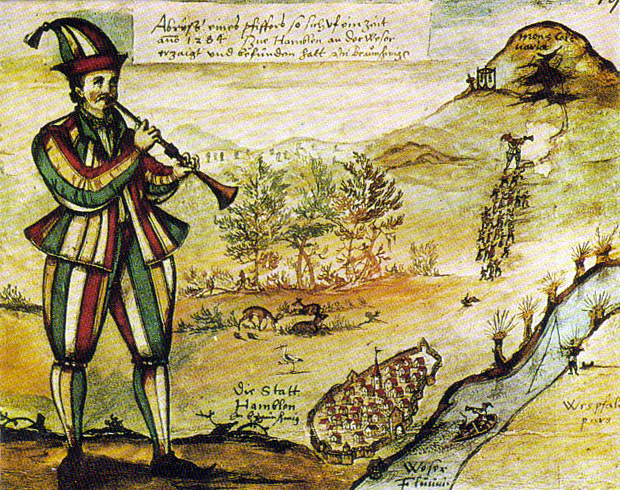
1592 painting of Pied Piper copied from the glass window of Marktkirche in Hamelin

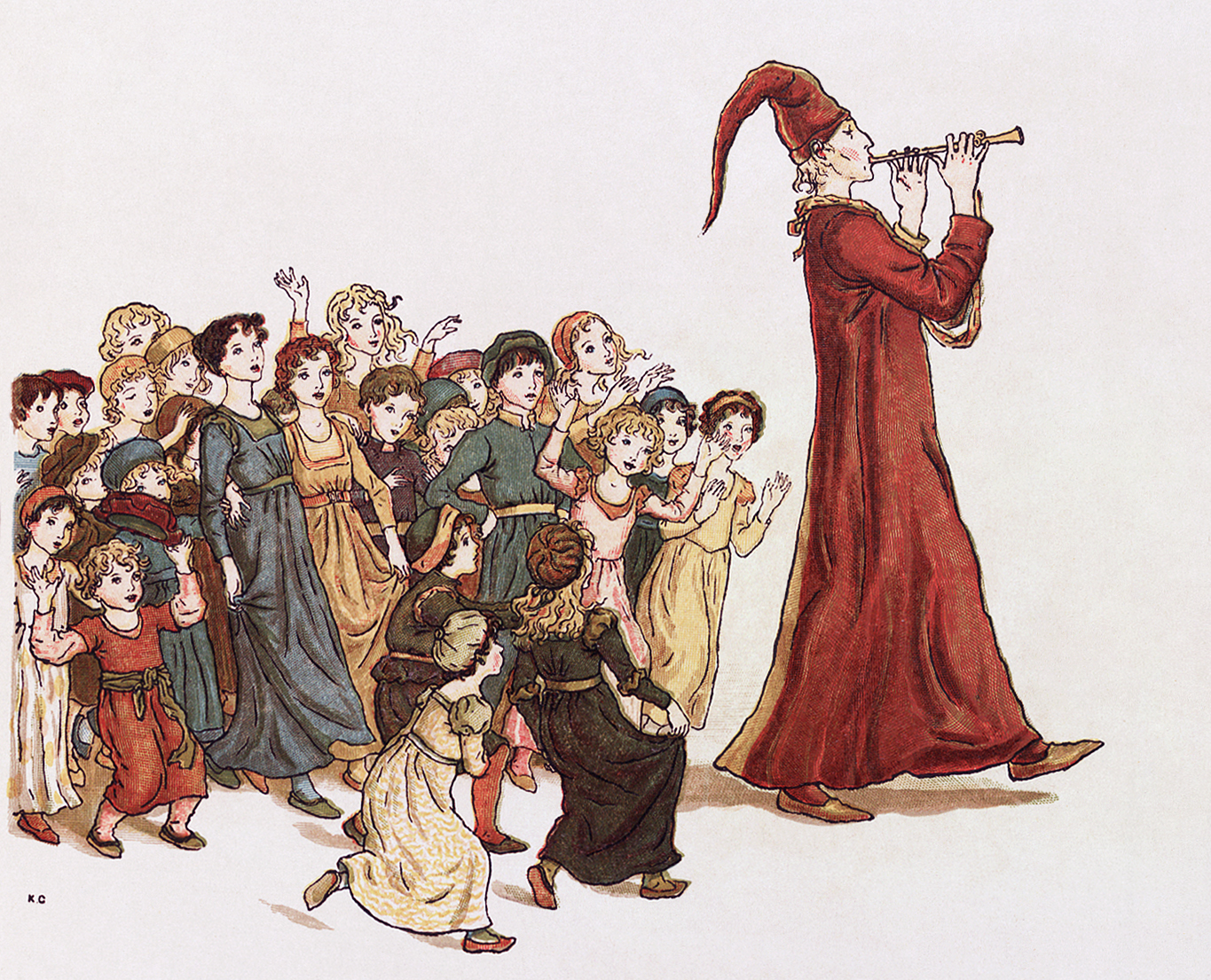
The Pied Piper leads the children out of Hamelin. Illustration by Kate Greenaway.

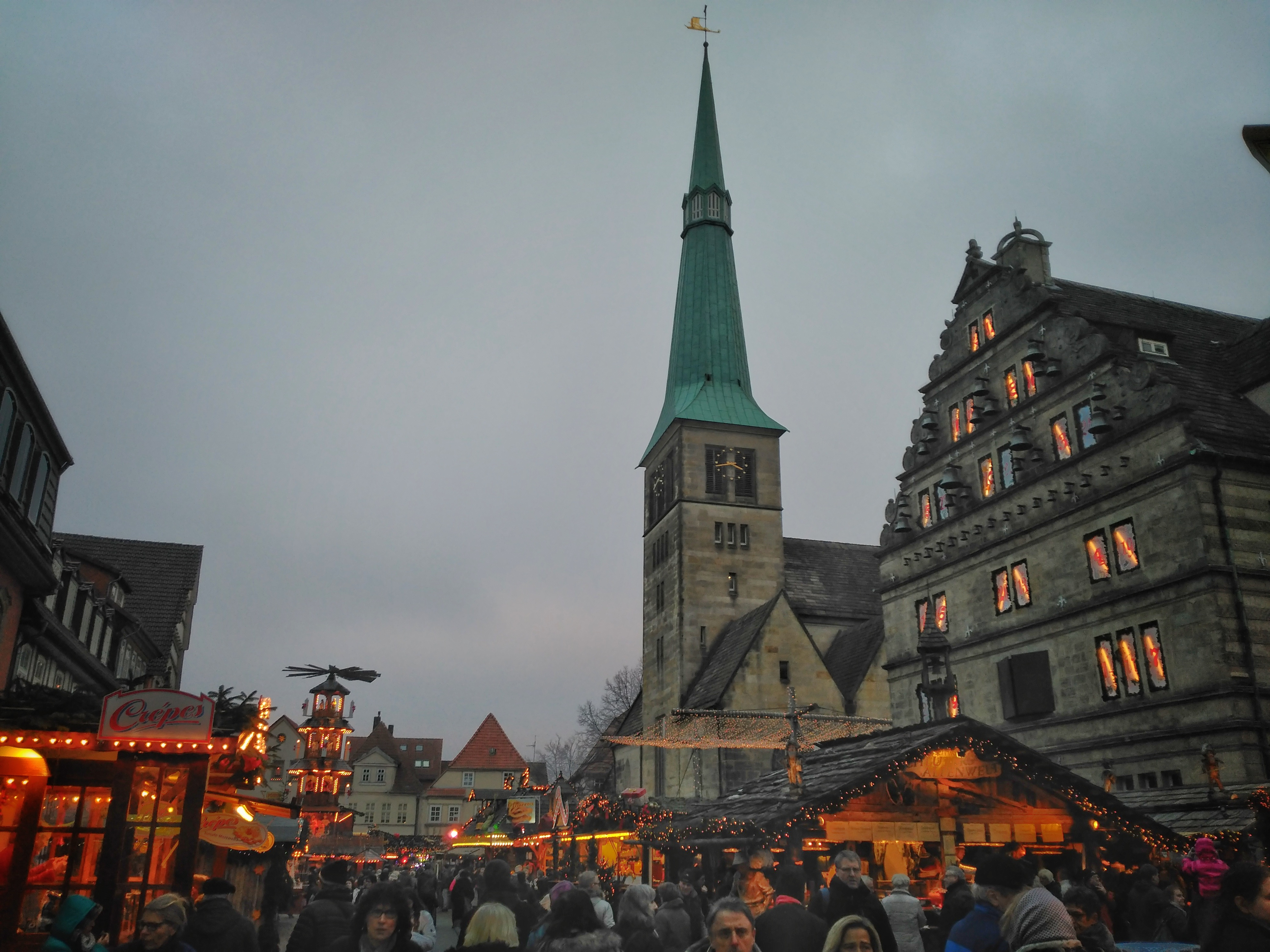
Christmas market in Hamelin

=== Tale of the Pied Piper ===
The town is famous for the folk tale of the Pied Piper of Hamelin (German: Der Rattenfänger von Hameln), a medieval story that tells of a tragedy that befell the town in the 13th century. The version written by the Brothers Grimm made it popular throughout the world. It is also the subject of well-known poems by Johann von Goethe and Robert Browning. Every Sunday in summer, the tale is performed by actors in the town centre.

== Twin towns – sister cities ==
Hamelin is twinned with:

- Kalwaria Zebrzydowska, Poland
- Quedlinburg, Germany
- Saint-Maur-des-Fossés, France
- Torbay, England, United Kingdom

== Media ==
The ("Deister and Weser newspaper"), known as DeWeZet, publishes out of Hamelin.

== British army presence ==
Hamelin was home to several Royal Engineer units, including 35 Engineer Regiment and 28 Amphibious Engineer Regiment until summer 2014, with many of the British families housed at Hastenbeck (Schlehenbusch) and Afferde. It was also home to the Royal Corps of Transport unit of 26 Bridging Regiment RCT, comprising 35 Sqn RCT and 40 Sqn RCT, until 1971.

== Notable people ==
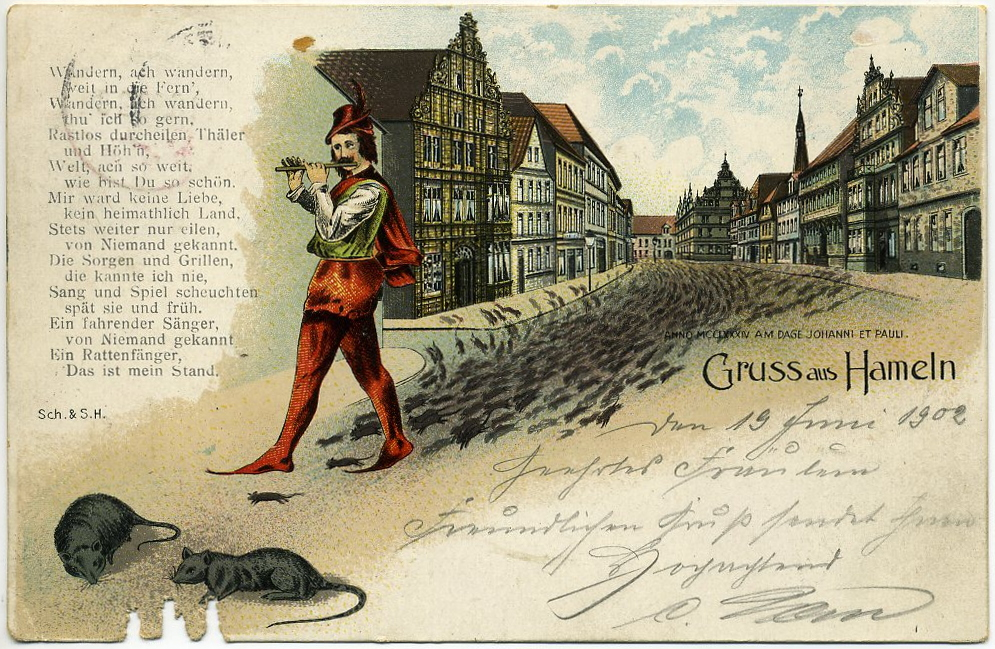
Postcard "Gruss aus Hameln" featuring the Pied Piper of Hamelin, 1902

- Saint Vicelinus (1086–1154), Bishop of Oldenburg, born in the town
- Pied Piper of Hamelin (ca 1284), the title character of a legend from the town
- Glückel of Hameln (1646–1724), Jewish businesswoman and diarist
- Peter the Wild Boy (ca 1713–1785), found in 1725 living wild in the nearby woods
- Friedrich Wilhelm von Reden (1752–1815), pioneer in mining and metallurgy
- Karl Philipp Moritz (1756–1793), author of the Sturm und Drang and Age of Enlightenment periods
- Anton Friedrich Justus Thibaut (1772–1840), a jurist and musician
- Friedrich Sertürner (1783–1841), pharmacist, isolated morphine from opium (1822–1841).
- Johann Ludwig Dammert (1788–1855), the first Mayor and President of the Senate of Hamburg in 1843
- Heinrich Bürger (1806–1858), German physicist, biologist and botanist, studied Japanese fauna and flora.
- Julius Wellhausen (1844–1918), Biblical scholar and orientalist
- Oswald Freisler (1895–1939), lawyer and brother of Roland Freisler
- Ida Schreiter (1912–1948), concentration camp warden executed for war crimes
- Heinz Knoke (1921–1993), German officer and flying ace of the Luftwaffe
- Reinhard Busse (born 1963), physician and health economist
- Benjamin-Gunnar Cohrs (1965–2023), conductor, beginning at the local Youth Music School
- Max Richter (born 1966), neo-classical composer
- Markus Pieper (born 1963), politician and MEP
- Susan Stahnke (born 1967), German TV presenter
- Jens Todt (born 1970), footballer who played 340 games

== See also ==
- German Fairy Tale Route
- Metropolitan region Hannover-Braunschweig-Göttingen-Wolfsburg

== Gallery ==
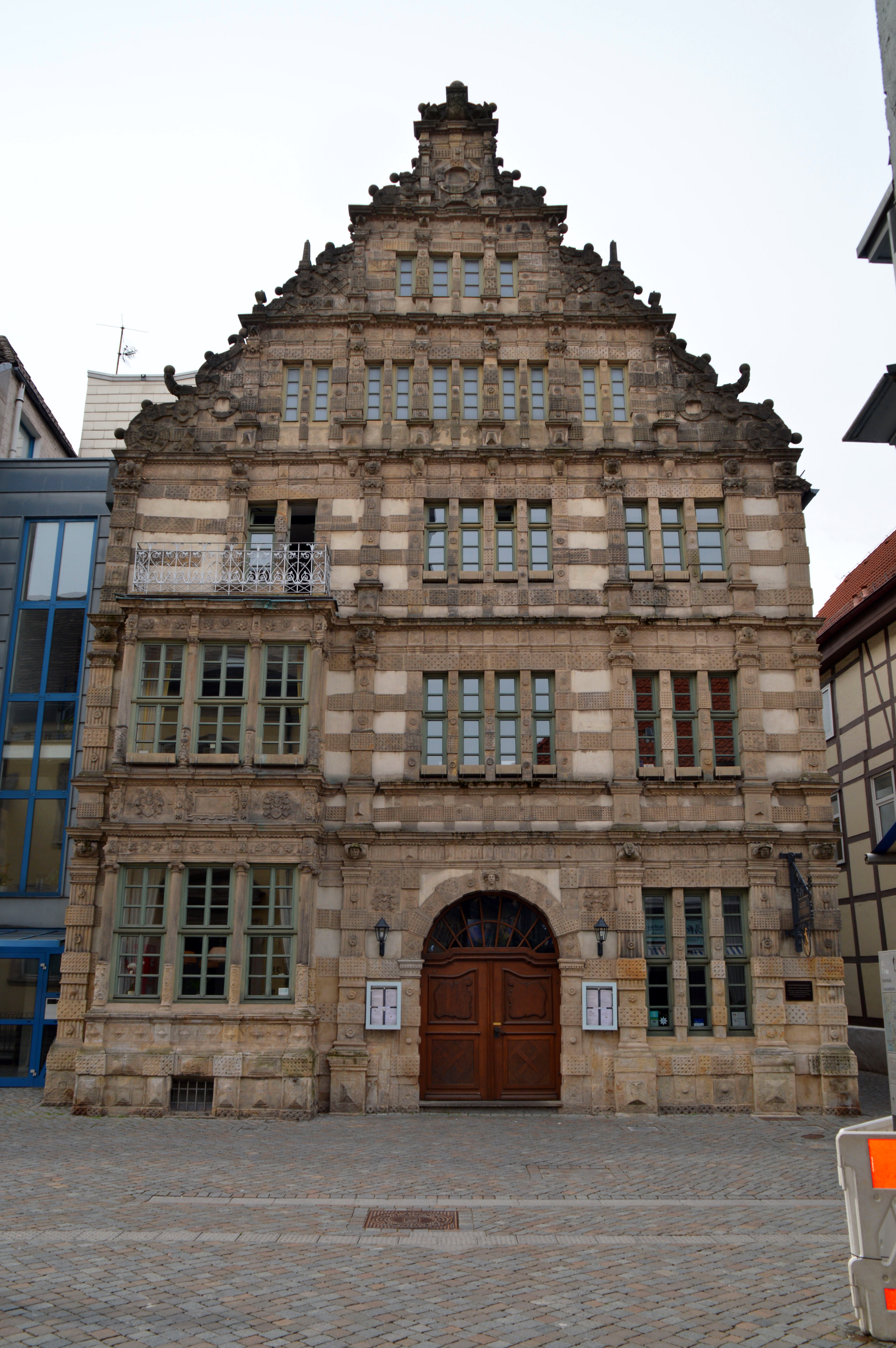
Rattenfängerhaus

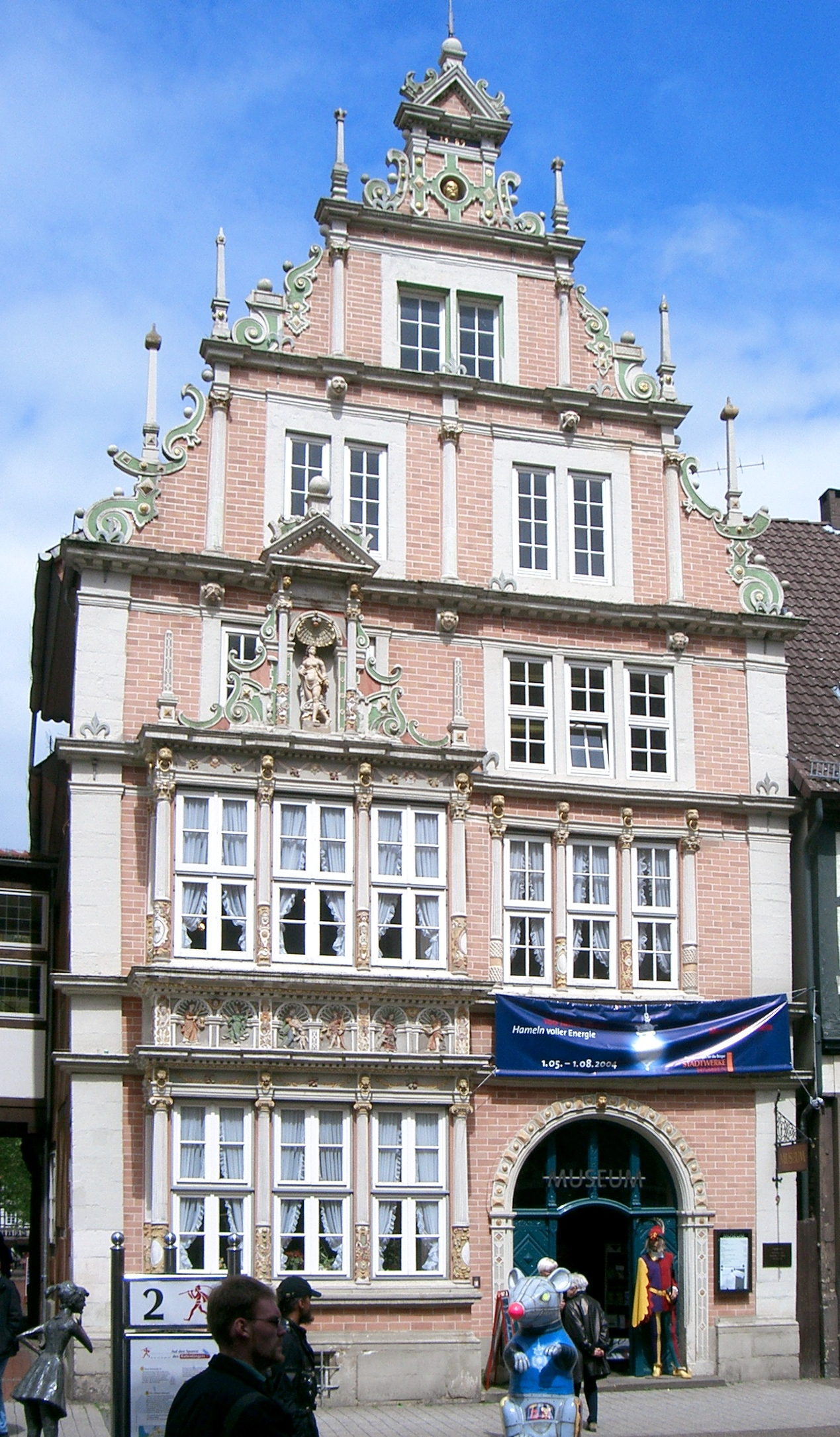
The Leisthaus

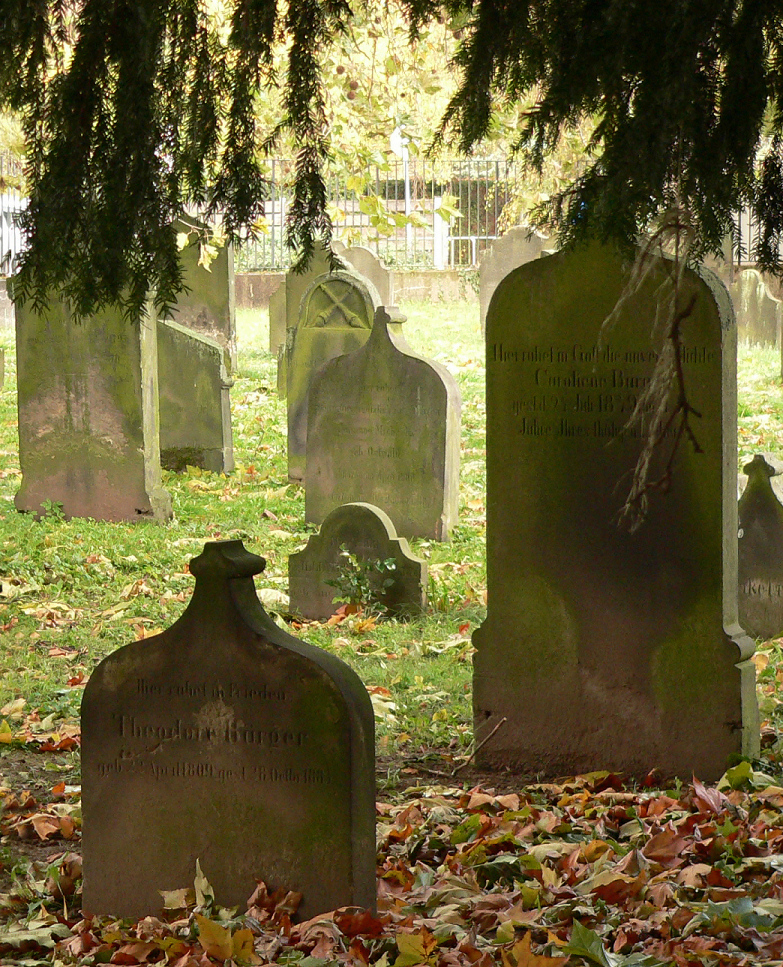
Jewish cemetery

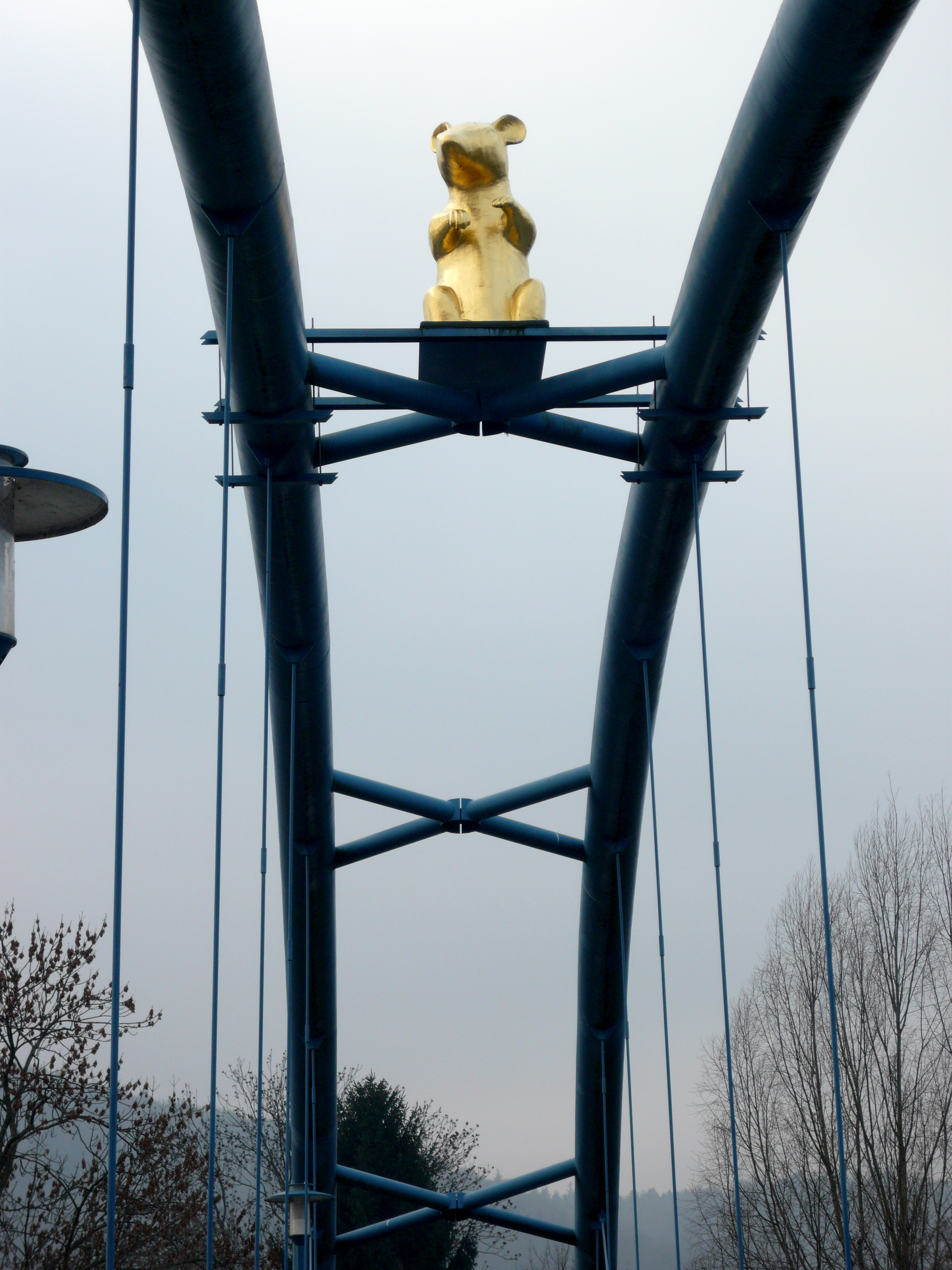
The Golden Rat, on a footbridge over the River Weser

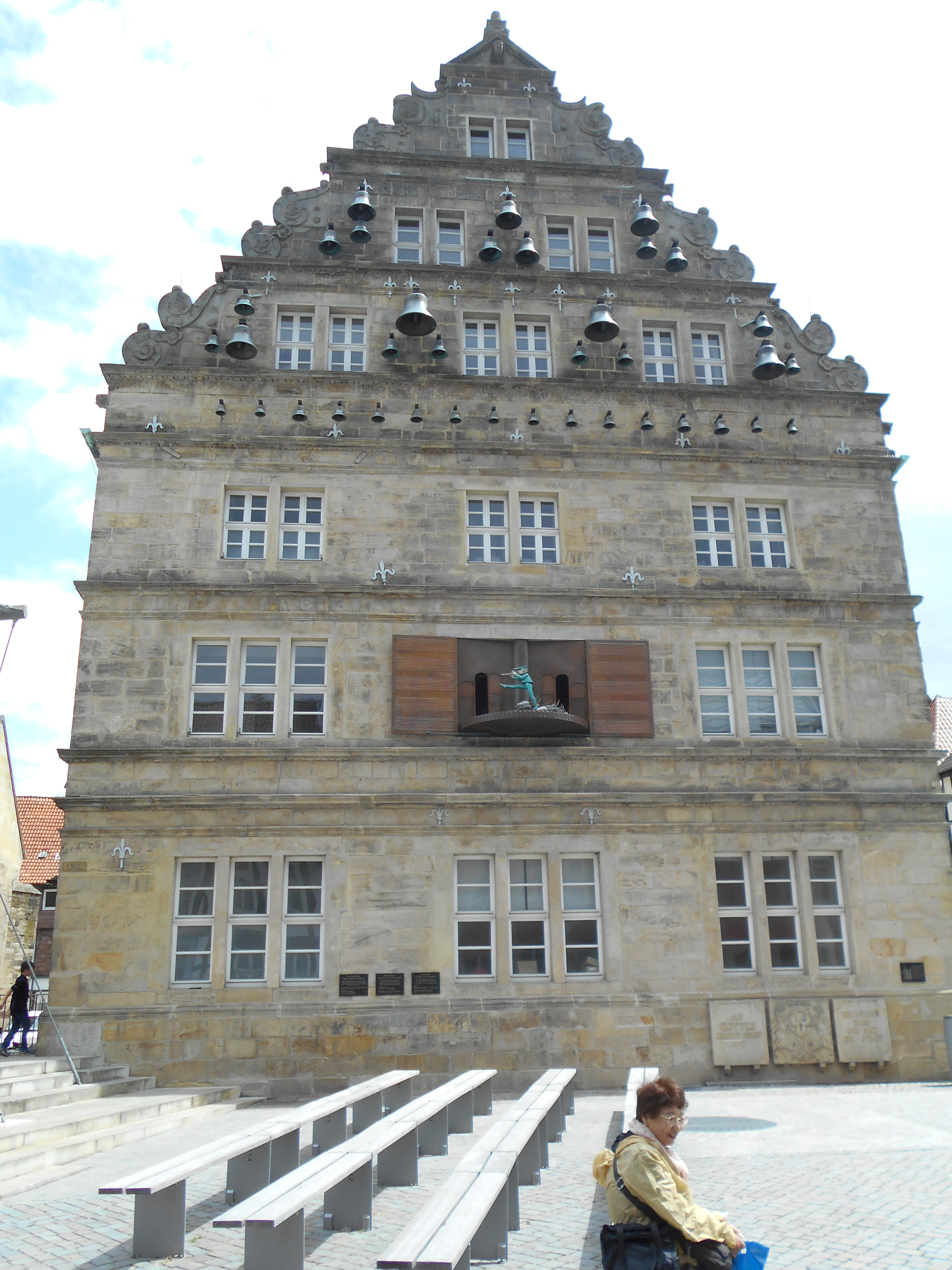
The Hochzeitshaus, the church's Glockenspiel plays the story of the Pied Piper of Hamelin
