= Varuna (book) =

1907 book by Willibald Hentschel

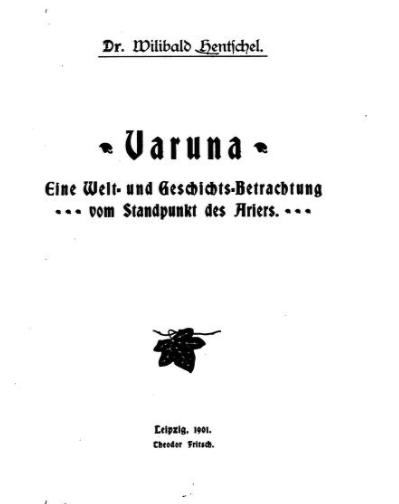
- Author: Willibald Hentschel
- Publication date: 1901

Varuna is a political literature book written and published in 1901 by German social Darwinist and racialist Willibald Hentschel. The book is named after the Hindu god Varuna. Hentschel declares the importance of racial purification of the Aryan race to history and calls for the unification of Germans in Eastern Europe into a German colony.
