= Richard Walther Darré =

Nazi politician (1895–1953)

Reich Minister for Food and Agriculture
- In office 29 June 1933 – 6 April 1944 (On leave from 23 May 1942)
- Chancellor: Adolf Hitler
- Preceded by: Alfred Hugenberg
- Succeeded by: Herbert Backe

Chief of the SS Race and Settlement Main Office
- In office 1 January 1932 – 12 September 1938
- Preceded by: Office established
- Succeeded by: Günther Pancke

National leader (Reichsleiter)
- In office 3 June 1933 – 23 May 1942

Additional positions
- 1933–1945: Member of the Greater German Reichstag
- 1932–1933: Member of the Reichstag

Personal details
- Born: Ricardo Walther Óscar Darré; 14 July 1895 Buenos Aires, Argentina
- Died: 5 September 1953 (aged 58) Munich, Bavaria, West Germany
- Party: Nazi Party
- Education: University of Halle
- Profession: Agronomist
- Cabinet: Hitler cabinet

Military service
- Allegiance: German Empire
- Branch/service: Imperial German Army
- Rank: Leutnant; SS-Obergruppenführer
- Battles/wars: World War I

Richard Walther Darré (born Ricardo Walther Óscar Darré; 14 July 1895 – 5 September 1953) was one of the leading Nazi "blood and soil" (Blut und Boden) ideologists and served as Reich Minister of Food and Agriculture. As the National leader (Reichsleiter) for agricultural policy, he was a high-ranking functionary in the Nazi Party and as a Senior group leader (Obergruppenführer) in the SS, he was the seventh most senior commander in that organisation.

Born in Belgrano, Buenos Aires, to German parents, Darré was schooled in Germany and saw active service in the Imperial German Army during the First World War. After the war, he pursued a degree in agriculture at the University of Halle and joined the agrarian and Völkisch Artaman League, where he began to develop the tendency which would become "blood and soil". His philosophy was a major influence on Heinrich Himmler, a fellow Artaman. In 1930, Darré joined the Nazi Party. Himmler appointed him chief of the SS Race and Settlement Main Office (RuSHA) in 1932, and a year later he was made Reich Minister of Food and Agriculture.

Darré was gradually sidelined as both Hitler and Himmler came to regard him as excessively theoretical. Himmler asked him to step down as leader of RuSHA in 1938, and by 1942 he was effectively forced into retirement. At the end of the war, Darré was arrested, tried and found guilty on three counts at the Ministries Trial. He was sentenced to seven years' imprisonment; following his release, he spent his final years in Bad Harzburg and died of liver cancer in 1953.

== Early life ==
Darré was born in Belgrano, a Buenos Aires neighbourhood in Argentina, to Richard Oscar Darré, a German with Huguenot ancestry (born 10 March 1854, Berlin; died 20 February 1929, Wiesbaden), (Note: Bramwell gives the middle name as "Oskar") and Emilia Berta Eleonore, née Lagergren (born 23 July 1872 in Buenos Aires to a Swedish-born father and German-born mother; died 20 July 1936 in Bad Pyrmont). (Note: Knobelsdorff gives Eleonore's parents as Theodor Erik Lagergren, born 1839 in Glömminge, Sweden, and Josefina Margarete Thole, born 1841 in Haselünne, Lower Saxony, Germany.) His father moved to Argentina in 1888 as a partner of the German international import/export wholesaler Engelbert Hardt & Co. (Note: He was baptised with the name "Richard" [written in Spanish as Ricardo]; the name "Walther" was adopted later to differentiate him from his father, also named Richard, and he became known by this name in political life, though he continued to sign his name as either "Richard Walther" or "R. Walther".) His parents' marriage was not a happy one; Richard Walther remembered his father as "a hard drinker and a womaniser". They lived prosperously and educated their children privately, until they were forced to return to Germany as a result of worsening international relations in the years preceding World War I. Darré gained fluency in four languages: Spanish, German, English, and French.

Darré's parents sent him to Germany at age nine to attend school in Heidelberg. In 1911, he attended King's College School in Wimbledon as an exchange student. The rest of the family returned to Germany in 1912. Richard (as he was known in the family) then spent two years at the Oberrealschule in Gummersbach, followed in early 1914 by the Kolonialschule at Witzenhausen, south of Göttingen, for training officials for the German colonies, which awakened his interest in farming.

After a single term at Witzenhausen, he volunteered for army service. He was slightly wounded a number of times while serving during World War I.

When the war ended, he contemplated returning to Argentina for a life of farming, but the family's weakening financial position during the years of inflation made that impossible. Instead, he returned to Witzenhausen to continue his studies. He then obtained unpaid work as a farm assistant in Pomerania. His observation of the treatment of returning German soldiers there influenced his later writings.

In 1922, he moved to the University of Halle to continue his studies. He undertook an agricultural degree, specialising in animal husbandry. He did not complete his PhD studies until 1929, at the age of 34. During those years, he spent some time working in East Prussia and Finland.

He married twice. In 1922, he married Alma Staadt, (Note: Full name Alberta Helene Theresa Alma Staadt; date of marriage 29 April 1922.) a schoolfriend of his sister Ilse. The marriage produced one daughter, Anneliese, born 1923. He and Alma divorced in 1927 and, in 1931, he married Charlotte Freiin von Vittinghoff-Schell, who survived him. The second marriage also produced one daughter, Elin, born 1938.

== Political career ==
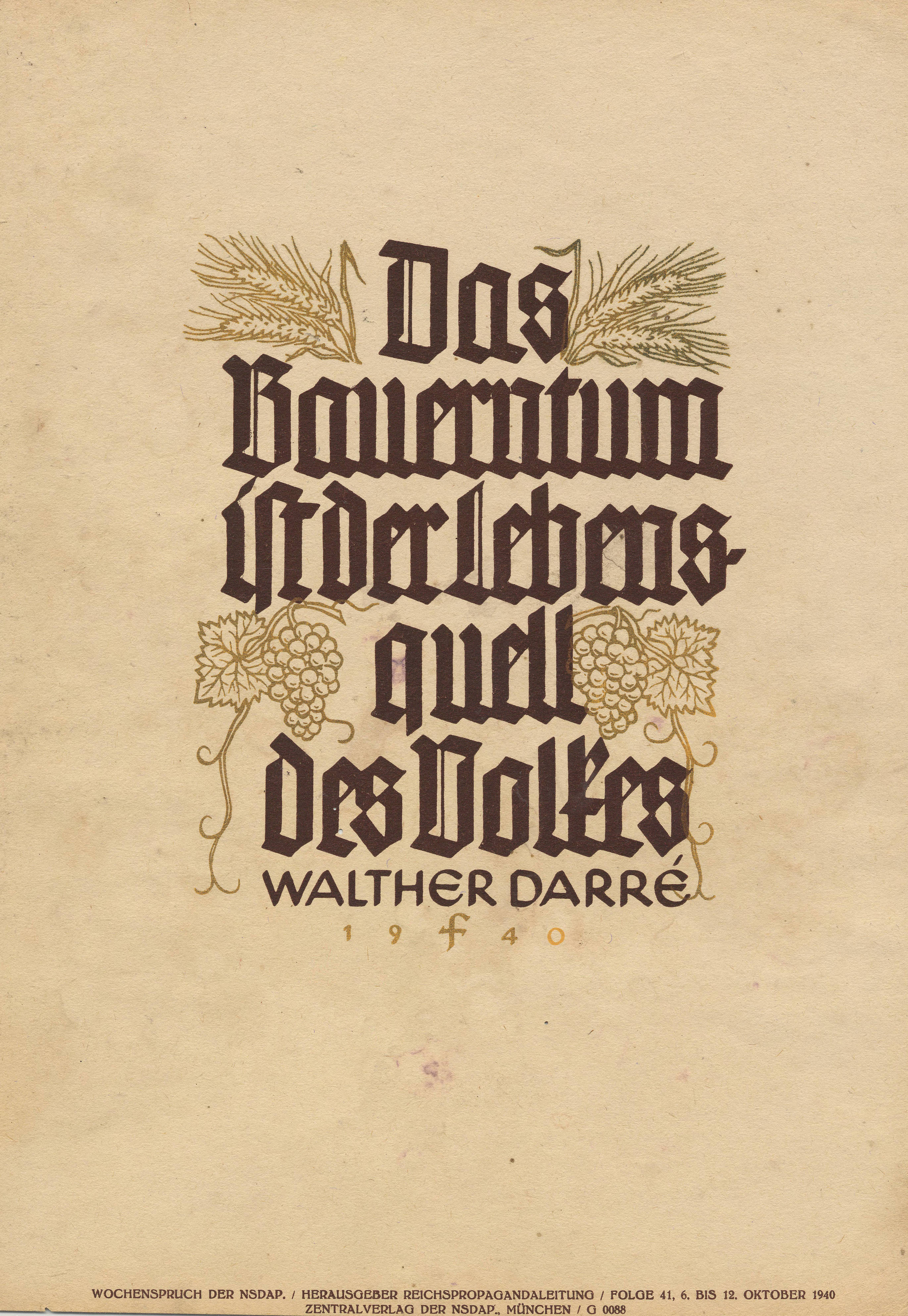
"The peasantry is the life source of the people", quote by Darré printed on the wall newspaper Wochenspruch der NSDAP of 8 October 1940

As a young man in Germany, Darré initially joined the Artaman League, a Völkisch youth-group committed to the back-to-the-land movement. In that context, he began to develop the idea of the link between the future of the Nordic race and the soil, the tendency which became known as "Blut und Boden" or Blood and Soil, where "blood" represents race and ancestry, while "soil" expresses the concepts of territory, land. The essence of the theory involved the mutual and long-term relationship between a people and the land that they occupy and cultivate.

Darré's first political article (1926) discussed Internal Colonisation and argued against Germany attempting to regain its lost colonies in Africa. Most of his writing at that time, however, concentrated on technical aspects of animal breeding. He wrote his first book, Das Bauerntum als Lebensquell der nordischen Rasse ('Peasantry as the life-source of the Nordic Race'), in 1928. It asserted that German farms had previously been bestowed on one son, the strongest, ensuring the best were farmers, but partible inheritance had destroyed that. Darré demanded the restoration of the ancient tradition, as well as serious efforts to restore the purity of Nordic blood through eugenics.

In her biography of Darré, Anna Bramwell interprets his writing as an early example of "Green" or Conservationist thinking. He advocated more natural methods of land management, placing emphasis on the conservation of forests, and demanded more open space and air in the raising of farm animals. Other scholars, however, have challenged that view. One sees Bramwell's books as "devoid of credible evidence" and containing "gross errors". Another acknowledges Bramwell's biography as "undoubtedly the best single source on Darré in either German or English", while at the same time saying that she "consistently downplays the virulently fascist elements in his thinking, portraying him instead as a misguided agrarian radical."

Those who heard and heeded Darré's arguments included Heinrich Himmler, himself one of the Artaman.

Darré's work also glorified "peasant virtues" – as found in the remnants of the Nordics who lived in the country – and disparaged city living.

In his two major works, he defined the German peasantry as a homogeneous racial group of Nordic antecedents, who formed the cultural and racial core of the German nation, and promoted the idea that since the Nordic birth-rate was lower than that of other races, the Nordic race was under a long-term threat of extinction.

=== Nazi Party member ===
In July 1930, after Paul Schultze-Naumburg had introduced him to Adolf Hitler, Darré joined the Nazi Party (# 248,256) and the SS (# 6,882). On 1 January 1932, the chief of the SS (Reichsführer-SS) Himmler appointed him chief of the newly established SS Race and Settlement Main Office, a racist and antisemitic organization concerned with the implementation of racial policies and the control of the racial integrity of SS members. In 1932 Darré was given the rank of SS-Group leader (SS-Gruppenführer) and in November 1934 he was promoted to SS-Senior group leader (SS-Obergruppenführer). During the 1932 presidential election, Darré engaged in a campaign of anti-Semitic harassment against Theodor Duesterberg, the candidate of the conservative German National People's Party, who, it emerged during the campaign, was the grandson of a Jewish convert to Lutheranism. Duesterberg was so wounded by Darré's attacks that he challenged him to a duel, a challenge that Darré declined under the grounds that it was beneath him to fight a man with "Jewish blood". Duesterberg then took up his dispute with Darré before the court of honor of the Former Officers of the 1st Hanoverian Field Artillery Regiment of Scharnhorst, number 10 to which Darré belonged. The court ruled in Darré's favor.

Darré was elected to the Reichstag in July 1932 and in the following two elections from the Nazi Party electoral list. He would continue to serve as a deputy until the fall of the Nazi regime in May 1945, being elected from electoral constituency 6 (Pomerania) in the November 1933 election and from constituency 28 (Dresden-Bautzen) in the March 1936 and April 1938 elections. Darré was not part of the first coalition government headed by Hitler. However, on 29 June 1933, shortly after the approval by the Reichstag of the Enabling Act of 23 March, he became Reich Minister of Food and Agriculture, succeeding DNVP leader Alfred Hugenberg, who had resigned. He concurrently was made Prussian Minister of Agriculture, and subsequently was named to the Prussian State Council by Prussian Minister President Hermann Göring. He was also named Reich Farmers Leader (Reichsbauernführer) in May 1933. On 2 June 1933 Hitler appointed Darré a National Leader (Reichsleiter) of the Party. He was also a founding member of the Hans Frank's Academy for German Law in October 1933.

Darré went on to set up an agrarian political apparatus to recruit farmers into the party operating along three main directives: to exploit unrest in the countryside as a weapon against urban governments; to win over the farmers as staunch Nazi supporters; to gain a constituency of people to be used as settlers displacing the Slavs in future land grabs in the East. The German historian Klaus Hildebrand described Darré together with Himmler and Alfred Rosenberg as one of the leaders of the "agrarian" fraction within the NSDAP who championed anti-industrial and anti-urban "blood and soil" ideology, expansion into Eastern Europe to gain Lebensraum, an alliance with Great Britain to defeat the Soviet Union, and staunch opposition to restoring the pre-1914 German colonial empire. The "agrarian" fraction took the view that Wilhelmine imperialism had taken Germany in the wrong direction by colonizing lands that were unsuitable for mass colonization by German settlers and had unwisely antagonized Britain. The lesson that the Nazi "agrarians" drew from the German Empire was that Germany must focus its ambitions to the continent of Europe in order to win an alliance with Britain and land suitable for German colonization.

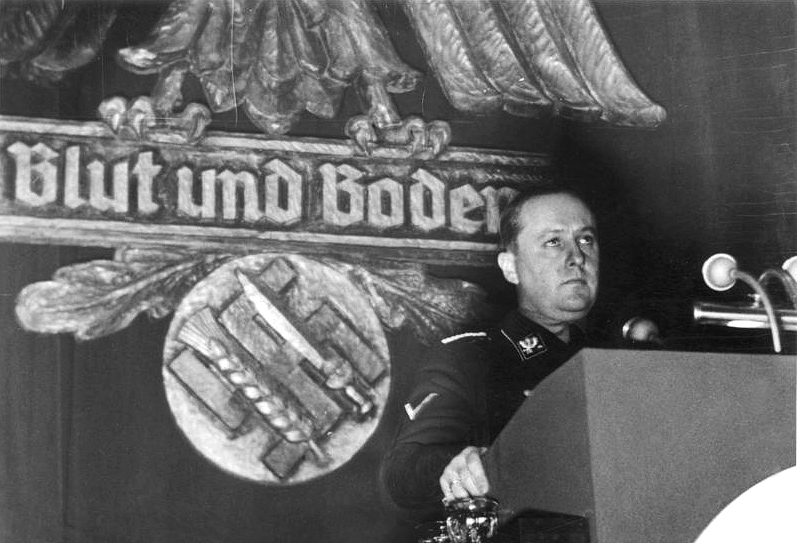
Darré speaking at a Reich Food Society (Reichsnährstand) assembly under the slogan Blut und Boden, Blood and soil, in Goslar, 1937

Darré was instrumental in founding the Nazi Reich Food Society (Reichsnährstand) as part of the Nazification process of the German society (Gleichschaltung ). Darré campaigned for big landowners to part with some of their land to create new farms, and promoted the controversial Hereditary Farm Law (Reichserbhofgesetz), which forcibly converted most of the country's small farms (from 7.5 to 125 hectares – 19 to 309 acres), into hereditary estates that were to be passed from father to son under the ancient laws of entailment. While the law protected small farmers from foreclosure and the ordeal of repossession, it also tied them and their descendants to their hereditary farm forever, not allowing it to be alienated nor mortgaged.

At the Nazi 'agricultural school' in Burg Neuhaus, the "Reich School of the Reichsnährstand for Physical Exercises" Darré promoted Nordic racial purity through eugenics and the "New nobility of blood and soil". Darré appointed the photographers Anna Koppitz and German sports photographer Hanns Spudich to produce pictures of the hand-picked young peasant farmers exercising for Rudolf Bode's Neuhaus gymnastik. The pictures appeared in the June 1939 Die 5. Reichsnährstands-Ausstellung ("5th Reich nutrition exhibition") in Leipzig and in Odal, the organ of Nazi propaganda.

Darré developed a plan for "Rasse und Raum" ("race and space", or territory) along the ideological lines of "Drive to the east" ("Drang nach Osten"), "Living space" ("Lebensraum") and "Hitler's dream of conquest" earlier expounded in Mein Kampf.

Darré strongly influenced Himmler in his goal to create a German racial aristocracy based on selective breeding. The extreme Nazi policies of eugenics would lead to the annihilation of millions of non-Germans. In the course of the preparations for the "Master Plan for the East" (Generalplan Ost), Himmler would later break with Darré, whom he saw as too theoretical. Although Darré was considered one of the few Nazi ministers who knew his field well, he was generally on bad terms with Economy Minister Hjalmar Schacht, particularly as Germany suffered poor harvests in the mid-1930s.

=== Discrediting and displacement ===
Darré's influence began to wane as Hitler and Himmler both came to feel that he was too much of a theoretician and an incompetent administrator. By September 1938, Himmler demanded that Darré step down as leader of the SS Race and Settlement Main Office in favour of Günther Pancke. Darré was later placed on an extended leave of absence as Reich Minister on 23 May 1942, ostensibly on health grounds, and his duties were assumed by his State Secretary, Herbert Backe. Darré nominally remained Reich Minister until Backe formally took over as Reich Minister on 6 April 1944. However, Darré was effectively sidelined from May 1942 and retired to his hunting lodge in the Schorfheide forest outside Berlin until the end of the Nazi regime.

The transcript of a 1940 speech, supposedly given by Darré, was published in Life magazine, 9 December 1940, reads:

By blitzkrieg . . . before autumn . . . we shall be the absolute masters of two continents . . . a new aristocracy of German masters will be created . . . . [with] slaves assigned to it, these slaves to be their property and to consist of landless, non-German nationals . . . we actually have in mind a modern form of medieval slavery which we must and will introduce because we urgently need it in order to fulfil our great tasks. These slaves will by no means be denied the blessings of illiteracy; higher education will, in future, be reserved only for the German population of Europe . . . .

== After the war ==
In April 1945, the American authorities arrested Darré, interned him at Flak-Kaserne Ludwigsburg and tried him at the Subsequent Nuremberg Trials, as one of 21 defendants in the Ministries Trial, also known as the Wilhelmstrasse Trial (1947–1949).

He was charged under the following counts:

- Count I: participation in the planning, preparation, initiation, and waging of wars of aggression and invasion of other countries. Found not guilty.
- Count II: conspiracy to commit crimes against peace and crimes against humanity: The count was dismissed, the tribunal finding that no evidence was offered.
- Count IV: crimes against humanity, relating to offenses committed against German nationals from 1933 to 1939. The count was dismissed upon the arguments of defense counsel.
- Count V: atrocities and offenses committed against civilian populations between 1938 and 1945. Found guilty.
- Count VI: plunder and spoliation. Found guilty.
- Count VII: slave labor. Found not guilty.
- Count VIII: membership of criminal organizations. Found guilty.

Darré was sentenced to seven years at Landsberg Prison. He was released in 1950 and spent his final years in Bad Harzburg. He died in a Munich hospital, on 5 September 1953, of liver cancer. He is buried in Goslar.

== Works ==
Darré's works were primarily concerned with ancient and present Nordic peasantry, and the ideology of blood and soil. Within this context, he made an explicit attack against Christianity. In his two main writings,

- Das Bauerntum als Lebensquell der nordischen Rasse, [Peasantry as Life-source of the Nordic Race] (1928)
- Neuadel aus Blut und Boden, [New Nobility from Blood and Soil] (1930),

Darré accused Christianity, with its "teaching of the equality of men before God," of having "deprived the Teutonic nobility of its moral foundations", the "innate sense of superiority over the nomadic tribes".

== See also ==
- Hunger Plan
- List SS-Obergruppenführer
- Nazism and race
- Reich Harvest Thanksgiving Festival
- Ecofascism

== Notes ==
Political offices
Preceded by Alfred Hugenberg	Minister of Food and Agriculture; 1933–1942	Succeeded by Herbert Backe
