= Reichsnährstand =

Government body of Nazi Germany

Reichsnährstand logo

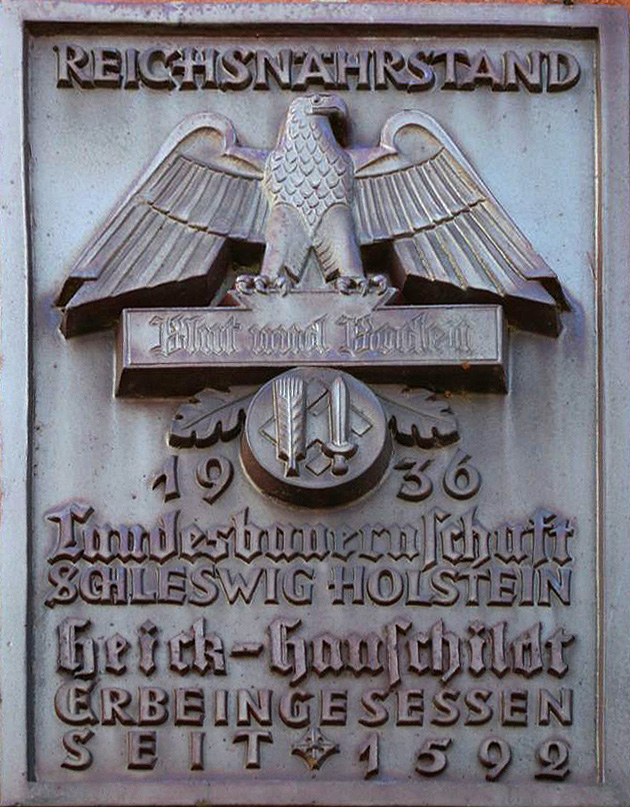
Reichsnährstand plaque in Schleswig-Holstein

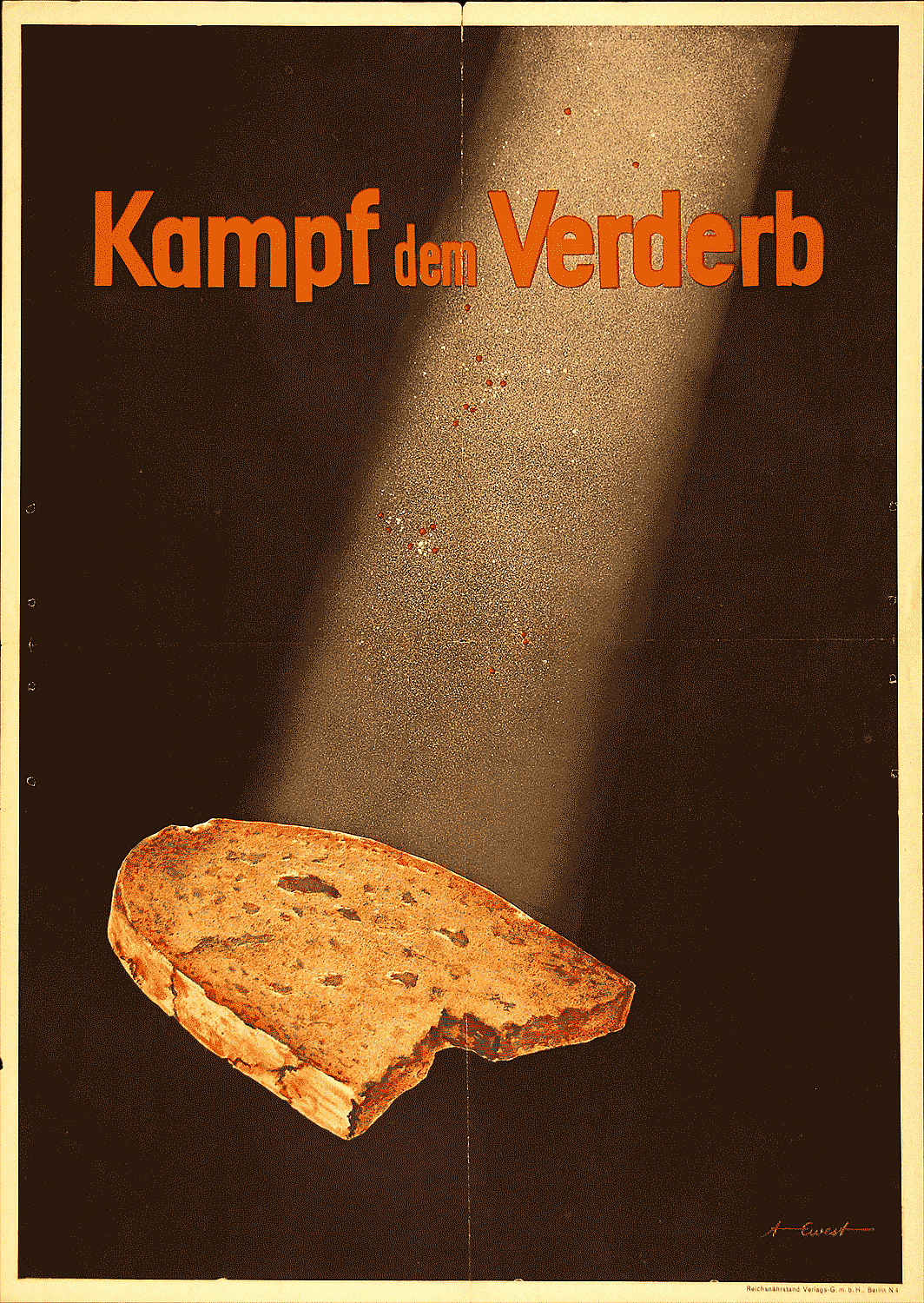
"Fight against Waste," Reichsnährstand poster from Berlin, 1937.

The Reichsnährstand ('Reich Food Corporation') was a government body set up in Nazi Germany to regulate food production.

== Foundation ==
The Reichsnährstand was founded by the Reichsnährstandsgesetz (decree) of 13 September 1933; it was led by R. Walther Darré.

== Policies and consequences ==
The Reichsnährstand had legal authority over everyone involved in agricultural production and distribution. It attempted to interfere in the market for agricultural goods, using a complex system of orders, price controls, and prohibitions, through regional marketing associations. Under the “Hereditary Farm Law of 1933” (Reichsnährstandsgesetz), farmers were bound to their land since most agricultural land could not be sold. The law was enacted to protect and preserve Germany's smaller hereditary estates that were no larger than 308 acres (125 ha). Below that acreage, farmlands could “not be sold, divided, mortgaged or foreclosed on for debt.” Cartel-like marketing boards fixed prices, regulated supplies and oversaw almost every facet in directing agricultural production on farmlands. Besides deciding what seeds and fertilizers were to be applied to farmlands, the Reichsnährstand secured protection from selling foreign food imports inside Germany, and placed a “moratorium on debt payments.”

As the scope and depth of the National Socialists command economy escalated, food production and rural standard of living declined. By autumn of 1936, Germany began to experience critical shortages of food and consumer goods, despite the spending of billions of Reichsmarks on price subsidies to farmers. Germans were even subjected to rationing of many major consumer goods, including “produce, butter and other consumables.” Besides food shortages, Germany began to encounter a loss of farm laborers, where up to 440,000 farmers had abandoned agriculture between 1933 and 1939.

The Reichsnährstand's argument that Germany "needed" an additional 7–8 million hectares (17–19 million acres) of farmland, and that consolidation of existing farms would displace many existing farmers who would need to work new land, influenced Hitler's decision to invade the Soviet Union.

== See also ==
- Blood and Soil
- Reich Harvest Thanksgiving Festival
- Lebensraum
