= Blood and soil =

Nationalist slogan

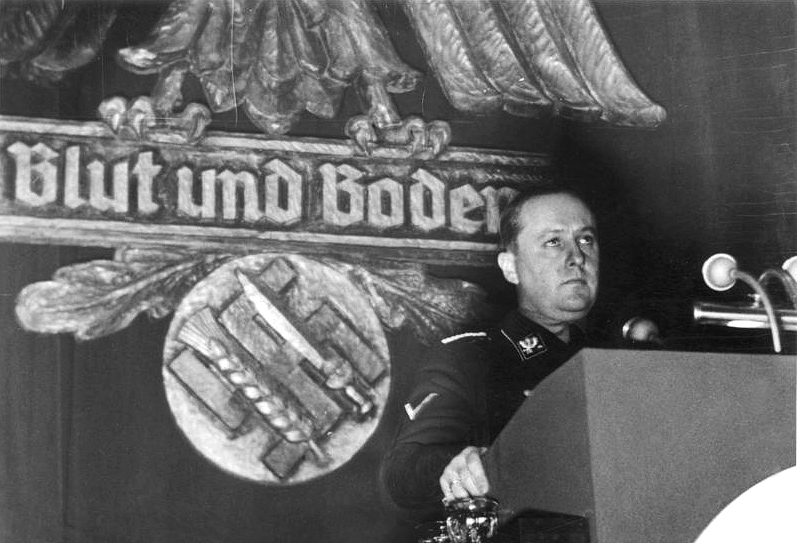
Richard Walther Darré addressing a meeting of the farming community in Goslar on 13 December 1937 standing in front of a Reichsadler and Swastika crossed with a sword and wheat sheaf labelled Blood and Soil

Blood and soil (German: Blut und Boden, pronounced [ˈbluːt ʊnt ˈboːdn̩]) is a ethno-nationalist phrase and concept of a racially defined national body ("Blood") united with a settlement area ("Soil"). The concept originates in the German völkisch movement.

"Blood and soil" was a significant slogan of Nazi Germany. The nationalist ideology of the Artaman League and the writings of Richard Walther Darré guided agricultural policies which were later adopted by Adolf Hitler, Heinrich Himmler and Baldur von Schirach. It is associated with the concept of Lebensraum, the belief that the German people were to expand into Eastern Europe, conquering and displacing the native Slavic and Baltic population via Generalplan Ost.

The concept has influenced and been used in ideologies other than Nazism, such as in contemporary white nationalism.

== Origins ==
The German expression was coined in the late 19th century, in tracts which espoused racialism/racism and romantic nationalism. It produced a regionalist literature, with some social criticism. This romantic attachment was widespread prior to the rise of the Nazis. Major figures in 19th century German agrarian romanticism included Ernst Moritz Arndt and Wilhelm Heinrich Riehl, who argued that the peasantry represented the foundation of the German people and conservatism.

Ultranationalists who predated the Nazis frequently supported country living by claiming that it was healthier than city living, with the Artaman League sending urban children to the countryside to work in the hope that they would be transformed into Wehrbauern (lit. "soldier peasants").

== Nazism ==
Richard Walther Darré popularized the phrase at the time of the rise of Nazi Germany in his 1930 book Neuadel aus Blut und Boden (A New Nobility Based On Blood And Soil), in which he proposed the implementation of a systematic eugenics program, arguing that selective breeding would be a cure-all for the problems which were plaguing the state. In 1928, he had also written the book, Peasantry as the Life Source of the Nordic Race, in which he presented his theory that the alleged difference between Nordic people and Southeastern Europeans was based in the Nordic people's connection to superior land. Darré was an influential member of the Nazi Party and a noted race theorist who assisted the party greatly in gaining support among common Germans outside the cities. Prior to their ascension to power, Nazis called for a return from the cities to the countryside. This agrarian sentiment allowed opposition to both the middle class and the aristocracy, and presented the farmer as a superior figure beside the moral swamp of the city.

The doctrine not only called for a "back to the land" approach and re-adoption of "rural values"; it held that German land was bound, perhaps mystically, to German blood. Peasants were the Nazi cultural heroes, who held charge of German racial stock and German history—as when a memorial of a medieval peasant uprising was the occasion for a speech by Darré praising them as a force and purifier of German history. Agrarianism was asserted as the only way to truly understand the "natural order." Urban culture was decried as a weakness, labelled "asphalt culture" and partially coded as resulting from Jewish influence, and was depicted as a weakness that only the Führer's will could eliminate.

The doctrine also contributed to the Nazi ideal of a woman: a sturdy peasant, who worked the land and bore strong children, contributing to praise for athletic women tanned by outdoor work. That country women gave birth to more children than city ones was also a factor in the support.

Philosopher Carl Schmitt argued that a people would develop laws appropriate to its "blood and soil" because authenticity required loyalty to the Volk over abstract universals.

Neues Volk displayed antisemitic demographic charts to deplore the alleged destruction of Aryan families' farmland and claim that the Jews were eradicating traditional German peasantry. Posters for schools depicted the flight of people from the countryside to the city. The German National Catechism, German propaganda widely used in schools, also spun tales of how farmers supposedly lost ancestral lands and had to move to the city, with all its demoralizing effects.

=== Nazi implementation ===
Logo of the Reich Ministry of Food and Agriculture featuring the text Blut und Boden (Blood and Soil)

The program received far more ideological and propaganda support than concrete changes. When Gottfried Feder tried to settle workers in villages about decentralized factories, generals and Junkers successfully opposed him. Generals objected because it interfered with rearmament, and Junkers because it would prevent their exploiting their estates for the international market. It would also require the breakup of Junker estates for independent farmers, which was not implemented.

The Reichserbhofgesetz, the State Hereditary Farm Law of 1933, implemented this ideology, stating that its aim was to: "preserve the farming community as the blood-source of the German people" (Das Bauerntum als Blutquelle des deutschen Volkes erhalten). Selected lands were declared hereditary and could not be mortgaged or alienated, and only these farmers were entitled to call themselves Bauern or "farmer peasant", a term the Nazis attempted to refurbish from a neutral or even pejorative to a positive term. Regional custom was only allowed to decide whether the eldest or the youngest son was to be the heir. In areas where no particular custom prevailed, the youngest son was to be the heir. During the Nazi era, the eldest son inherited the farm in most cases. Priority was given to the patriline, so that, if there were no sons, the brothers and brothers' sons of the deceased peasant had precedence over the peasant's own daughters. The countryside was also regarded as the best place to raise infantry, and as having an organic harmony between landowner and peasant, unlike the "race chaos" of the industrial cities. It also prevented Jewish people from farming: "Only those of German blood may be farmers."

The concept was a factor in the requirement of a year of land service for members of Hitler Youth and the League of German Girls. This period of compulsory service was required after completion of a student's basic education, before they could engage in advanced studies or become employed. Although working on a farm was not the only approved form of service, it was a common one; the aim was to bring young people back from the cities, in the hope that they would then stay "on the land". In 1942, 600,000 boys and 1.4 million girls were sent to help bring in the harvest.

=== Lebensraum ===
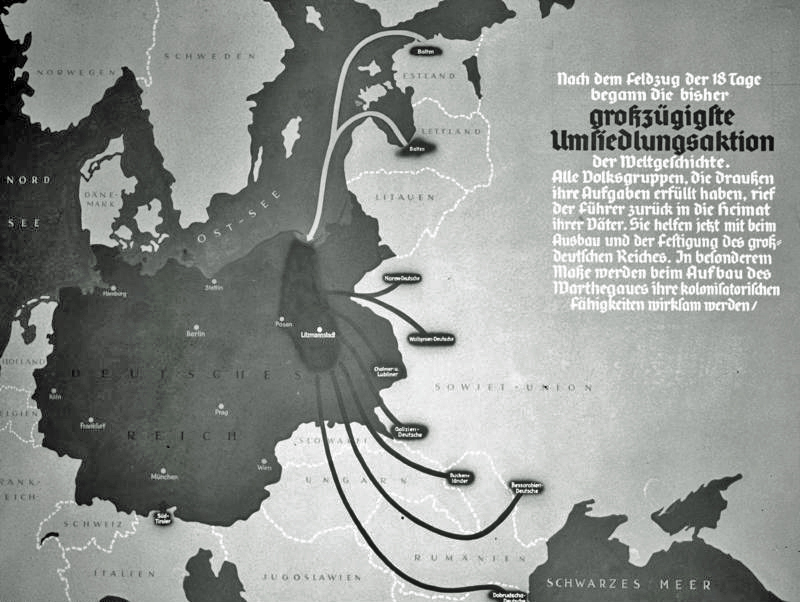
Origin of German colonisers in annexed Polish territories. Was set in action "Heim ins Reich".

Blood and soil was one of the foundations of the concept of Lebensraum, "living space". By expanding eastward and transforming those lands into breadbaskets, another blockade, such as that of World War I, would not cause massive food shortages, as that one had, a factor that aided the resonance of "Blood and soil" for the German population. Even Alfred Rosenberg, not hostile to the Slavs as such, regarded their removal from this land, where Germans had once lived, as necessary because of the unity of blood and soil. Mein Kampf prescribed as the unvarying aim of foreign policy the necessity of obtaining land and soil for the German people (again, "German people" defined by the Nazi Party as racially pure).

While discussing the question of Lebensraum to the east, Hitler envisioned a Ukrainian "breadbasket" and expressed particular hostility to its "Russian" cities as hotbeds of Russianness and Communism, forbidding Germans to live in them and declaring that they should be destroyed in the war. Even during the war itself, Hitler gave orders that Leningrad was to be razed with no consideration given for the survival and feeding of its population. This also called for industry to die off in these regions. The Wehrbauer, or soldier-peasants, who were to settle there were not to marry townswomen, but only peasant women who had not lived in towns. This would also encourage large families.

Furthermore, this land, held by "tough peasant races", would serve as a bulwark against attack from Asia.

=== Use in art ===
==== Fiction ====
Prior to the Nazi take-over, two popular genres were the Heimat-Roman, or regional novel, and Schollen-Roman, or novel of the soil, which was also known as Blut-und-Boden. This literature was vastly increased, the term being contracted into "Blu-Bo", and developed a mysticism of unity. It also combined war literature with the figure of the soldier-peasant, uncontaminated by the city. These books were generally set in the nominal past, but their invocation of the passing of the seasons often gave them an air of timelessness. "Blood and soil" novels and theater celebrated the farmer's life and their fertility, often mystically linking them.

One of the antisemitic fabrications in the children's book Der Giftpilz was the claim that the Talmud described farming as the most lowly of occupations. It also included an account of a Jewish financier forcing a German to sell his farm as seen by a neighbor boy; deeply distressed, the boy resolved never to let a Jew into his house, for which his father praised him, on the grounds that peasants must remember that Jews will always take their land.

==== Fine art ====
During the Nazi period in Germany, one of the charges put forward against certain works of art was that "Art must not be isolated from blood and soil." Failure to meet this standard resulted in the attachment of the label "degenerate art" to offending pieces. In art of Nazi Germany, both landscape paintings and figures reflected blood-and-soil ideology. Indeed, some Nazi art exhibits were explicitly titled "Blood and Soil". Artists frequently gave otherwise apolitical paintings such titles as "German Land" or "German Oak". Rural themes were heavily favored in painting. Landscape paintings were featured most heavily in the Greater German Art Exhibitions. While drawing on German Romantic traditions, painted landscapes were expected to be firmly based on real landscapes, the German people's Lebensraum, without religious overtones. Peasants were also popular images, promoting a simple life in harmony with nature. This art showed no sign of the mechanization of farm work. The farmer labored by hand, with effort and struggle.

The acceptance of this art by the peasant family was also regarded as an important element.

==== Film ====
Under Richard Walther Darré, The Staff Office of Agriculture produced the short propaganda film Blut und Boden, which was displayed at Nazi party meetings as well as in public cinemas throughout Germany. Other Blut und Boden films likewise stressed the commonality of Germanness and the countryside. Die goldene Stadt has the heroine running away to the city, resulting in her pregnancy and abandonment; she drowns herself, and her last words beg her father to forgive her for not loving the countryside as he did. The film Ewiger Wald (The Eternal Forest) depicted the forest as being beyond the vicissitudes of history, and the German people the same because they were rooted in the story; it depicted the forest sheltering ancient Aryan Germans, Arminius, and the Teutonic Knights, facing the peasants wars, being chopped up by war and industry, and being humiliated by occupation with black soldiers, but culminated in a neo-pagan May Day celebration. In The Journey to Tilsit, the Polish seductress is portrayed as an obvious product of debased "asphalt culture" (urbanity) but the virtuous German wife is a country-dweller in traditional costume. Many other commercial films of the Nazi era featured gratuitous, lingering shots of the German landscape and idealized 'Aryan' couples.

== Ukrainian nationalism ==
The Banderite flag

The red and black colours of the flag of the Banderite faction of the Organisation of Ukrainian Nationalists and the Ukrainian Insurgent Army represent blood and soil.

== Zionism ==
Presbyterian theologians Walter T. Davis and Pauline Coffman have asserted that the concept of blood and soil had an influence on nationalisms across Europe, including aspects of Zionist ideology. (Note: Donald E. Wagner, Walter T. Davis (2014). Zionism and the Quest for Justice in the Holy Land', Chapter One: Political Zionism from Herzl (1890s) to Ben-Gurion (1960s) by Walter T. Davis and Pauline Coffman. Quotation: "In Europe during the second half of the nineteenth century, the Age of Nationalism and the Age of Imperialism converged. Building on ideas of the Enlightenment and the French Revolution, which promised equal rights for all, nationalist movements based on blood and soil arose all over Europe while their countries competed with each other to expand their colonial empires overseas. Political Zionism was one of these national-colonial movements") According to David Biale, "Before the Nazis came to power in Germany... the language of 'blood and soil' ... held wide appeal for Jews searching for new ways of defining themselves."

While acknowledging the pre-Nazi use of "blood and soil" as an "abstract, Hegelian term", Raphael Falk notes, "Zionists adopted the concept of Volk in terms of a nation-race as molded by the notion of Blood and Soil ..." Falk cites Israel's national poet as an example:

A blunt, unfortunate example of the adherence of the Zionists to the nineteenth-century notion of Blood and Soil as ground for their territorial rights is the statement by the poet Chaim Nachman Bialik at a press conference at The Hebrew University of Jerusalem in the beginning of 1934: "I too, like Hitler, believe in the power of blood."

Falk says he knows of no other precedent for the Zionist effort to biologically sort humanity into Jew and non-Jew are the "Nazi efforts to diagnose the biological belonging of individuals to national-ethnic entities ..."

Walter Laquer identified Martin Buber as "an early protagonist of Blut und Boden". Laquer argues that anti-Zionists have used this fact outside of its historical context as an attack on Zionism, and that Buber's use of the concept, in its historical context, was "innocent". Hans Derks criticizes Laquer for downplaying Buber's views and, quoting Laquer, those of other Zionist "advocates of the volkische idea". Laquer's purpose, according to Derks, is "to avoid the painful nazism-zionism relationship." To Derks, historical context does not exonerate Buber. Derks asserts that "in that time many people in and outside Palestine rightly attacked zionists for their radical right-wing thoughts and warned their large audiences against it." Biale, on the other hand, says that Buber's invocation of Blood and Soil "was very far from either racism or integral nationalism."

In his biography of Arthur Ruppin, Etan Bloom says the importation "of the Christian-European model of the Maccabeans" resulted in the establishment of the "Blut und Boden trope... in the emerging Modern Hebrew culture." Biale also cites poets Ya'akov Cahan and Kadish Lieb Silman as propagators of Blood and Soil ideology in Zionist culture.

In 1944, Hannah Arendt criticized Zionism for its insistence on the "politics of 'blood and soil'" and its "uncritical acceptance of German-inspired nationalism," an ideology that "explains peoples... in terms of biological superhuman personalities."

== White nationalism in the United States ==
North American white supremacists, white nationalists, Neo-Nazis and members of the alt-right have adopted the slogan. It gained widespread public prominence as a result of the August 2017 Unite the Right rally in Charlottesville, Virginia, when participants carrying torches marched on the University of Virginia campus on the night of 11 August 2017 and were recorded chanting the slogan, among others. The rally was organized to protest the town's planned removal of a statue of Robert E. Lee. The rally remained in national news through December 2018 thanks to the trial of James Alex Fields, a white supremacist who purposefully ran his car into a crowd of counter-protestors, killing 32-year old paralegal Heather Heyer. The chant was also heard in October 2017 at the "White Lives Matter" rally in Shelbyville, Tennessee.

In his 2018 farewell letter, US Senator John McCain stated that America is "a nation of ideals, not blood and soil", specifically rejecting such notions.

Vice-President JD Vance has been accused of supporting the concept of blood and soil in his speeches, for implying that America is not just an idea, but rather a group of people with a shared history, culture and ancestry tied to the land since the founding of the country in 1776, adding that the notion of America as an idea is "overinclusive and underinclusive. It would include hundreds of millions, maybe billions, of foreigners. Must we admit them tomorrow? But, at the same time, that answer would also reject a lot of people the ADL would label domestic extremists, even though their own ancestors were here at the time of the Revolutionary War."

In 2025, Vivek Ramaswamy criticized the Groypers for advocating a blood and soil ideology.

== Other uses ==
A 1943 Japanese government report titled An Investigation of Global Policy with the Yamato Race as Nucleus made extensive use of the term, usually in quotation marks, and showing an extensive debt to the Nazi usage.

== See also ==
- Ethnic nationalism
- Indigenism
- Irredentism
- Nativism (politics)
- Race (human categorization)
- Reichsnährstand
- Volkstaat
- White ethnostate
