= Zimmer (surname) =

Origin
- Language: Germanic

Other names
- Variant forms: Zimmerman, Zimmermann, Zimerman, Simmerman, Timmerman

Zimmer is Germanic surname, meaning "room" or "chamber", and a common Jewish surname. Derivative names include Zimmermann (Zimmerman), the occupational surname meaning Carpenter, literally translated "room man" (i.e. someone who builds wooden structures to be lived in).

== List of people with this surname ==
=== Sciences ===
- Alan E. Zimmer (1929–1993), American neuroradiologist
- Andreas Zimmer, German neurobiologist
- Carl Zimmer (born 1966), American popular science writer
- Carl Wilhelm Erich Zimmer (1873–1950), German zoologist
- Cheryl A. Zimmer (born 1954), American conservation biologist
- John Todd Zimmer (1889–1957), American ornithologist
- Karl Zimmer (1911–1988), German physicist and radiation biologist
- Louis Zimmer (1888–1970), Belgian clockmaker and astronomer
- Marc Zimmer (born 1961), South African chemist

=== Sports ===
- Adam Zimmer (1984–2022), American football coach
- Adolf Zimmer (1908–1940), Polish footballer
- André Zimmer (1912–1984), Luxembourgish sprint canoeist
- Andy Zimmer (1919–2005), American basketball player
- Bradley Zimmer (born 1992), American baseball player
- Charles Louis "Chief" Zimmer (1860–1949), American baseball player
- Cyril Zimmer (1896–1951), Australian rules footballer
- Don Zimmer (1931–2014), American baseball manager and coach
- Hans-Ludwig Zimmer (born 1950), German lightweight rower
- Heidi Zimmer, American deaf mountaineer
- Jean Zimmer (born 1993), German footballer
- Justin Zimmer (born 1992), American football player
- Kurt Zimmer (1924–2008), German sprint canoeist
- Kyle Zimmer (born 1991), American baseball player
- Madeleine Zimmer (born 2001), American field hockey player
- Maximilian Zimmer (born 1992), German footballer
- Michael Zimmer (footballer) (born 1955), German footballer
- Mike Zimmer (born 1956), American football coach, defensive coordinator for the Dallas Cowboys
- Moritz Zimmer (born 1993), German footballer
- Sabine Zimmer (born 1981), German race walker
- Tayliah Zimmer (born 1985), Australian swimmer
- Tom Zimmer (born 1952), American baseball player, coach and manager
- Werner Zimmer (1929–2019), German wrestler

=== Politics ===
- Bob Zimmer (born 1968), Canadian politician from British Columbia
- Dawn Zimmer (born 1968), American politician from New Jersey
- Diana Zimmer (born 1998), German politician
- Dick Zimmer (1944–2025), American politician from New Jersey
- Gabi Zimmer (born 1955), German politician
- J. Eugene Zimmer (1912–1995), American politician from New York
- Jakob Zimmer (born 1999), German politician
- Lars-Jörn Zimmer (born 1970), German politician
- Matthias Zimmer (1961–2023), German politician
- Melvin N. Zimmer (1938–2002), American politician from New York
- Mike Zimmer (politician) (born 1963/64), American politician from Iowa
- Nicolas Zimmer (born 1970), German politician
- Rod Zimmer (1942–2016), Canadian politician from Manitoba
- Russell Zimmer (1926–2024), American politician from Wyoming
- Susanne Zimmer (born 1960), Danish politician
- Walter Zimmer (born 1945), Uruguayan physician and politician

=== Acting ===
- Constance Zimmer (born 1970), American actress
- Kim Zimmer (born 1955), American actress
- Laurie Zimmer (born 1949), former American actress
- Pierre Zimmer (1927–2010), French actor and film director

=== Music ===
- Hans Zimmer (born 1957), German composer, best known for film scores
- Ján Zimmer (1926–1993), Slovak composer and pianist
- Joana Zimmer (born 1982), German pop music singer
- Kinny Zimmer (born 1999), Polish rapper, singer, songwriter and producer
- Norma Zimmer (1923–2011), American vocalist

=== Other ===
- Art Zimmer (born 1938), American businessman, re-founder of Zimmer (automobile)
- Ben Zimmer (born 1971), American linguist and lexicographer
- Bernard Zimmer (1893–1964), French screenwriter
- Dirk Zimmer (1943–2008), German-American artist, children's books illustrator and writer
- Dorothea Schwartz Zimmer (fl. 1800), German painter
- Emma Zimmer (1888–1948), German war criminal, overseer at the Ravensbrück concentration camp executed for war crimes
- Eyck Zimmer (born 1969), English chef
- Florian Zimmer, German magician
- Frederik Zimmer (born 1944), Norwegian legal scholar
- George Zimmer (born 1948), American businessman, founder of the Men's Wearhouse
- Gerhard Zimmer (born 1949), German classical archaeologist
- Greta Zimmer (1924–2016), Austrian-American dental assistant and subject of the photograph V-J Day in Times Square
- Hans-Peter Zimmer (1936–1992), German painter and sculptor
- Heinrich Zimmer (Celticist) (1851–1910), German Celticist
- Heinrich Zimmer (1890–1943), German Indologist
- Hermann Zimmer, German Baháʼí
- Jeremy Zimmer (born 1958), American entertainment executive
- John Zimmer (born 1984), American businessman, co-founder of Zimride
- Leone McNeil Zimmer (1916–2014), American stained glass artist
- Marion Zimmer Bradley (1930–1999), American fantasy author
- Michael Zimmer, American privacy and social media scholar
- Nathan Löb David Zimmer (1830–1895), English Kabbalist
- Nicolai Zimmer (1810–1894), Danish lawyer and Inspector of North Greenland
- Nina Zimmer (born 1973), German art historian
- Patrick Benedict Zimmer (1752–1820), German Catholic philosopher and theologian
- Pascal Zimmer (born 1995), German missing person
- Richard Zimmer (1893–1971), German military officer
- Robert Zimmer (1947–2023), American mathematician, former provost of Brown University and former president of the University of Chicago
- Robert Zimmer (philosopher) (born 1953), German philosopher and essayist
- Zachary Zimmer, Canadian sociologist and gerontologist

=== Multiple people ===
- Paul Zimmer (disambiguation), several people
- David Zimmer (disambiguation), several people

== Fictional characters ==
- Anthony Zimmer, fictional character
- David Zimmer, main character in The Book of Illusions
- Leila Kwan Zimmer, a character in the Netflix series Grand Army
- Doctor Zimmer, a fictional character from the 2008 console game Fallout 3

== See also ==
- Zimmer (disambiguation)
