= Zimmerman (surname) =

Origin
- Language: Germanic
- Meaning: Carpenter, "room builder"
- Region of origin: Germany

Other names
- Variant form: See the navigation box at the bottom

Zimmerman is a surname, a variant of the German Zimmermann, meaning "carpenter" (literally "room man"). The modern German terms for carpenter are Zimmerer, Tischler, or Schreiner, but Zimmermann is still used. It is also commonly associated with Ashkenazi Jews.

Zimmer in literal German means "room" or archaically a chamber within a structure; it is cognate with the English word "timber". The German mann means "man" or "worker". Combining the two German words, one gets "a worker of wood", or, literally translated, "room man" or "room worker".

At the 1990 United States census, it ranked as the 441st-most common surname. German names were regularly Anglicized with immigration. Surnames were often translated, so in this case, Zimmerman would become Carpenter.

Notable people and characters with the surname include:

== People ==
- Amy Zimmerman (fl. 2026), American politician in Wisconsin
- Arnold Zimmerman (1954–2021), American ceramic artist
- Arthur Augustus Zimmerman (1869–1936), American champion cyclist
- Bailey Zimmerman (born 2000), American singer
- Benjamin Zimmerman (1862–1923), member of the Jewish emigration from Russia
- Camille Zimmerman (born 1995), American basketball player
- Carl Zimmerman (cricketer) (1898–1969), New Zealand cricketer
- Carle C. Zimmerman (1897–1983), American sociologist
- Charles H. Zimmerman (1908–1996), aeronautical engineer
- Charles S. Zimmerman (1896–1983), American socialist activist and trade union official
- Dale A. Zimmerman (1928–2021), American naturalist
- Dean Zimmerman (philosopher), American philosopher, academic, and author
- Dick Zimmerman (born 1937), American magician and pianist
- Don Zimmerman (disambiguation), multiple people
- Donald Zimmerman (born 1931), American politician from Kansas
- Elizabeth Zimmerman (born 1948), Filipina retired flight attendant and former wife of President Rodrigo Duterte
- Elyn Zimmerman (born 1945), American sculptor
- Eric Zimmerman (born 1969), American computer game designer
- Eugene Zimmerman (1862–1935), American cartoonist
- Eugene Zimmerman (industrialist) (1845–1914), American industrialist
- Franklin B. Zimmerman (born 1923), American musicologist
- Frederick Henry Zimmerman (1883–1968), American businessman and farmer
- Frederick Hinde Zimmerman (1864–1924), American farmer and businessman
- Fred R. Zimmerman (1880–1954), American politician from Wisconsin
- Gabe Zimmerman (1980–2011), Director of Community Outreach for Gabrielle Giffords
- Gail D. Zimmerman (1933–2025), American politician from Wyoming
- George Zimmerman (born 1983), shot and killed Trayvon Martin
- George O. Zimmerman (1935–2019), Polish-American scientist and professor
- Heinie Zimmerman (1887–1969), American baseball player
- Herman F. Zimmerman (born 1935), art director and production designer
- Howard Zimmerman (1926–2012), American professor of chemistry
- Jacob Zimmerman (1831–1912), American newspaper editor and owner, politician, and businessman from Illinois
- James Edward Zimmerman (1923–1999), American physicist
- James Fulton Zimmerman (1847–1944), American historian, sociologist, president of New Mexico University
- Jan Zimmerman, American government official, chair of the Missouri Gaming Commission
- Jason Zimmerman (born 1989), professional game player under the pseudonym Mew2King
- Jeff Zimmerman (American football) (born 1965), American football player
- Jeff Zimmerman (born 1972), Canadian-born baseball pitcher
- Jeri Zimmerman, birth name of Jeri Ryan (born 1968), American actor
- J. Fred Zimmerman Jr. (1871–1948), American theater manager and stage producer
- J. Fred Zimmerman Sr. (1841–1925), American theater owner
- Jill Zimmerman, computer scientist
- Joel Zimmerman (born 1981), Canadian producer and DJ known as Deadmau5
- Jo Ann Zimmerman (1936–2019), American nurse and politician from Iowa
- John Zimmerman (figure skater) (born 1973), American figure skater
- Jonathan Zimmerman, American historian of education
- Jordan Zimmerman (born 1975), professional baseball pitcher
- Joey Zimmerman (born 1986), American actor
- Joshua Soule Zimmerman (1874–1962), American lawyer, politician, and orchardist from West Virginia
- Kris Zimmerman, American voice actor and voice-over director
- Leigh Zimmerman, American actress, singer and dancer
- Mary Zimmerman, American dramatist
- Matt Zimmerman (disambiguation), multiple people
- Michael E. Zimmerman (born 1946), American philosopher, academic, and author
- Michael Zimmerman (historian) (1951–2007), German chronicler
- Michael Zimmerman (biologist) (born 1953), American biologist and professor
- Michael Zimmerman (tennis) (born 1970), American tennis player
- Nancy Zimmerman, American hedge fund manager
- Oscar Zimmerman (1910–1987), American classical musician
- Patric Zimmerman (born 1954), American voice actor
- Paul Zimmerman (sportswriter) (1932–2018), American football sportswriter known as "Dr. Z"
- Paul D. Zimmerman (1938–1993), American screenwriter, film critic and activist
- Peter Zimmerman (1941–2021), American nuclear physicist and academic
- Peter C. Zimmerman (1887–1950), American politician from Oregon
- Philip Zimmerman (born 1945), American iconographer
- Phyllis Zimmerman (1934–2012), American composer, conductor and educator
- Pierre-Joseph-Guillaume Zimmerman (1785–1853), French pianist and composer
- Preston Zimmerman (born 1988), American footballer for Hamburg SV II
- Rachel Zimmerman (born ca 1973), Canadian-born space scientist and inventor
- Robert Allen Zimmerman, birth name of Bob Dylan (born 1941), American singer-songwriter
- Robert C. Zimmerman (1910–1996), American politician from Wisconsin
- Robert D. Zimmerman (born 1952), American author of mysteries, psychological thrillers, and children's books
- Roy Zimmerman (baseball) (1916–1991), baseball player
- Roy Zimmerman (satirist) (born 1957), American singer/songwriter/guitarist
- Ryan Zimmerman (born 1984), American baseball player
- Samuel Zimmerman (1815–1857), Canadian railway entrepreneur
- Shannon Zimmerman, American businessman and politician from Wisconsin
- Sheldon Zimmerman (born 1942), American Reform rabbi
- Shraga Feivel Zimmerman, American rabbi
- Steven Zimmerman, American organic chemist and professor
- Thomas Zimmerman (1838–1914), German-American writer and translator
- Trent Zimmerman (born 1968), Australian politician from New South Wales
- Tucker Zimmerman (1941–2026), American singer-songwriter
- Vernon K. Zimmerman (born 1928), American accounting scholar
- William Carbys Zimmerman (1856–1932), American architect

== Fictional characters ==
- Pvt. Fielding Zimmerman, character in The Phil Silvers Show
- Lewis Zimmerman, creator of the Emergency Medical Hologram in the Star Trek series
- Dr. Zimmerman, in the Heroes series
- Jára Cimrman, a Czech character of a universal genius
- Zim Zimmerman, talk show host in the 1992 film Straight Talk

== See also ==
- Zimmerman (disambiguation)
- Zimmermann (disambiguation)
- Simmerman, a variant of Zimmerman
- Timmerman, Dutch variant of Zimmerman
