= Zimmermann =

- Language: Germanic

Origin
- Meaning: Carpenter, room builder

Other names
- Variant form: See the navigation box at the bottom

Zimmermann is a German occupational surname for a carpenter. The modern German terms for the occupation of carpenter are Zimmerer, Tischler, or Schreiner, but Zimmermann is still used.

A variant of Zimmermann is Zimmerman. Other variants include Zimmermanns, Timmermann, Cymerman and Cimrman.

== Notable people with the surname ==
- Adolphus Zimmermann (1812–1891), American politician
- Alain Zimmermann (born 1967), German businessman
- Alexandra Zimmermann, British conservation scientist
- Annika Zimmermann (born 1989), German journalist
- Arthur Zimmermann (1864–1940), German Secretary of State for Foreign Affairs in 1917
- Bettina Zimmermann (born 1975), German actress
- Bodo Zimmermann (1886–1963), a German general during World War II
- Dominikus Zimmermann (1685–1766), German rococo architect
- Eberhard August Wilhelm von Zimmermann (1743–1815), German geographer and zoologist
- Eduard Zimmermann (1929–2009), German journalist
- Elizabeth Zimmermann (1910–1999), British-born knitter and writer
- Evan Zimmermann (born 1968), American businessman
- Ferdinand Zimmermann (1898–1967), German author and journalist
- Friedrich Zimmermann (1925–2012), German politician
- Hubert Zimmermann (1941–2012), French computer networks scientist and entrepreneur
- Jaclyn Zimmermann, American politician
- Jens Zimmermann (disambiguation), various people
- Jérémie Zimmermann, (born 1978) co-founder of the Paris-based La Quadrature du Net
- Jeri Lynn Zimmermann (born 1968), better known as Jeri Ryan, actress
- Johann Georg Ritter von Zimmermann (1728–1795), Swiss philosopher and physician
- Johann Jacob Zimmermann (1644–1693), German nonconformist
- Johannes Zimmermann (missionary) (1825–1876), German missionary
- Johannes Zimmermann (politician) (born 1961), Liechtenstein teacher and politician
- Joseph Zimmermann (engineer) (1912–2004), American inventor of the first successful answering machine
- Lydia Zimmermann (born 1966), Spanish filmmaker
- Mark Zimmermann (born 1998), German streamer and content creator
- Marie Zimmermann (1878–1972), American designer
- Moshe Zimmermann (born 1943), Israeli historian
- Paul Zimmermann (1895–1980), German SS-Brigadeführer
- Paul Zimmermann (blacksmith) (born 1939), German blacksmith who created contemporary forge work
- Paul Zimmermann (born 1964), French computational mathematician
- Philip R. Zimmermann (born 1954), creator of Pretty Good Privacy (PGP) e-mail encryption software
- Pia Zimmermann (born 1956), German politician
- Raquel Zimmermann (born 1983), Brazilian fashion model
- Reinhard Zimmermann (born 1952), German jurist
- Reinhard Sebastian Zimmermann (1815–1893), German artist
- Sabine Zimmermann (TV host) (1951–2020), German TV host
- Sabine Zimmermann (politician) (born 1960), German politician
- Vera Zimmermann, Brazilian actress
- Warren Zimmermann (1934–2004), American ambassador
- Wolfhart Zimmermann (1928–2016), German theoretical physicist

=== Composers ===
- Anton Zimmermann (1741–1781), Austrian composer living and working in Bratislava
- Bernd Alois Zimmermann (1918–1970), German composer of the opera Die Soldaten
- Charles A. Zimmermann (1861–1916), American composer of marches and popular music
- Margrit Zimmermann (1927–2020), Swiss pianist, composer, conductor and music educator
- Udo Zimmermann (1943–2021), German composer from Dresden, not related
- Walter Zimmermann (born 1949), German composer from Schwabach, not related

=== Musicians ===
- Dan Zimmermann (born 1966), German drummer for power metal band Gamma Ray
- Ethel Agnes Zimmermann, birth name of Ethel Merman (1908–1984), American singer and actress
- Frank Peter Zimmermann (born 1965), German violinist
- Josef Zimmermann,
  - German Cologne Cathedral organist
  - German weight lifter
- Margarita Zimmermann (born 1942), Argentinian mezzo-soprano
- Tabea Zimmermann (born 1966), German violist

=== Sportspeople ===
- Andréa Zimmermann (born 1976), Swiss ski mountaineer
- Andreas Zimmermann (born 1969), German footballer
- Bruce Zimmermann (born 1995), American baseball player
- Christian Zimmermann (born 1961), German-Palestinian dressage rider
- Christoph Zimmermann (born 1993), German footballer
- Cyril Zimmermann (born 1976), Swiss football referee
- Egon Zimmermann (1939–2019), 1964 Olympic alpine skier from Austria
- Egon Norbert Zimmermann (1933–2016), 1960 Olympic alpine skier from Austria and who married Penny Pitou
- Felicia Zimmermann (born 1975), American Olympic fencer
- Georg Zimmermann (born 1997), German cyclist
- Herbert Zimmermann (football commentator) (1917–1966), German football commentator and Knight's Cross of the Iron Cross recipient
- Herbert Zimmermann (footballer) (born 1954), German football player
- Iris Zimmermann (born 1981), American Olympic fencer
- Jordan Zimmermann (born 1986), Major League Baseball pitcher
- Pierre Zimmermann (bridge) (born 1955), Monegasque bridge player
- Rodolfo Zimmermann (1951–2012), Argentine footballer.
- Tim Zimmermann (born 1996), German racing driver
