= Timmerman =

Timmerman is a German and Dutch occupational surname with the meaning "carpenter". Notable people with the surname include:

- Adam Timmerman (1971), American football guard
- Axel Timmermann, climate physicist and oceanographer
- Gert Jan Timmerman (1956), Dutch chess player
- George Bell Timmerman, Sr. (1881–1966), American federal judge
- George Bell Timmerman, Jr. (1912–1994), American politician
- Grant F. Timmerman (1919–1944), American marine awarded the Medal of Honor, posthumously
- Héctor Timerman (1953–2018), Argentine journalist, politician, human rights activist and diplomat
- Karl H. Timmermann, first American officer across the Ludendorff Bridge
- Kenneth R. Timmerman (1953), American journalist, political writer and activist
- Lawrence J. Timmerman (1878–1959), American politician
- Lawrence W. Timmerman (1910–2003), American politician
- Petronella Johanna de Timmerman (1723–1786), Dutch poet and scientist
- Vincent Timmerman, Belgian scientist
- Walter Meijer Timmerman Thijssen (1877–1943), Dutch rower
- William Timmerman, American president of SCANA Corporation
- Yvonne Timmerman-Buck (1956), Dutch politician

Timmerman may also refer to:

- 12626 Timmerman, a main-belt minor planet
- Lawrence J. Timmerman Airport, an American airport
- USS Timmerman (DD-828), a U.S. Navy vessel
