= Roy Zimmerman =

Roy Zimmerman may refer to:

- Roy Zimmerman (baseball) (1916–1991), first baseman
- Roy Zimmerman (American football) (1918–1997), running back and quarterback, and fastpitch softball pitcher
- Roy Zimmerman (satirist) (born 1957), American satirical singer-songwriter and guitarist

== See also ==
- Leroy Zimmerman (disambiguation)
- Zimmerman (disambiguation)
