= Lawrence Timmerman =

Lawrence Timmerman may refer to:

- Lawrence J. Timmerman (1878–1959), American politician and lawyer
- Lawrence W. Timmerman (1910–2003), his son, member of the Wisconsin State Assembly
