= John Zimmerman =

John Zimmerman may refer to:

- John Zimmerman (politician), mayor of Lancaster, Pennsylvania from 1856 to 1857
- John Zimmerman (figure skater) (born 1973), American professional pair skater
- John Zimmermann (historian), German historian
- John C. Zimmerman Sr. (1835–1935), mayor of the City of Flint 1895–1896
- John G. Zimmerman (1927–2002), American magazine photographer
- John R. Zimmerman, meteorologist, see Zimmerman Island
- Long John Nebel, an influential New York City talk radio show host
