= Paul Zimmer =

Paul Zimmer may refer to:

- Paul Edwin Zimmer (1943–1997), American author and poet
- Paul Zimmer (poet) (born 1934), American poet and editor
- Paul Zimmer, automobile executive; founder of Zimmer (automobile)

== See also ==
- Zimmer (surname)
- Zimmer (disambiguation)
- Paul (disambiguation)
- Paul Zimmerman (disambiguation)
