= Fred Zimmerman =

Fred or Frederick Zimmerman may refer to:

- Frederick Zimmermann (1906–1967), American double bassist and teacher
- Frederick Hinde Zimmerman (1864–1924), American banker, farmer, real estate entrepreneur, businessman, and hotel owner
- Frederick Henry Zimmerman (1883–1968), American politician in the Minnesota House of Representatives
- Fred R. Zimmerman (1880–1954), Republican politician who became governor of Wisconsin
- J. Fred Zimmerman Jr. (1871–1948), American theater manager and stage producer
- J. Fred Zimmerman Sr. (1843–1925), American theater owner and leader of the Theatrical Syndicate
