= Cimrman =

Cimrman (feminine: Cimrmanová) is a Czech surname, created by transcription of the German surname Zimmermann. Notable people with the surname include:

- Otto Cimrman (1925–1988), Czech ice hockey player

== Fictional people ==
- Jára Cimrman, fictional Czech polymath
