= Zimmer =

Zimmer is a Germanic word meaning room and also a surname.

It may refer to:

== People ==
- Zimmer (surname), people with the surname
- Zimmer massacre, the 1812 massacre of the Zimmer family in Ohio

== Places ==
- 3064 Zimmer, asteroid named after Louis Zimmer
- Zimmer tower, a tower in Lier, Belgium
- Zimmerberg, mountain and region in Zürich, Switzerland

== Companies ==
- Zimmer Biomet, an American medical device company
- Zimmer Biomet Robotics, a Swiss robotics company

== Music ==
- Zimmer 483, second studio album by the German rock band Tokio Hotel
- Zimmer mit Blick, the fifth studio album by German band Revolverheld
- The Zimmers, an English rock band
- Zimmers Hole, a Canadian death metal band

== Other uses ==
- Zimmer (automobile), an American neo-classic automaker
- Zimmer frame, UK term for a walking aid rolling frame
- Zimmer's conjecture

== See also ==
- Zimerman
- Zimmerman (disambiguation)
- Zimmermann (disambiguation)
