= Leroy Zimmerman =

Leroy Zimmerman is the name of:

- LeRoy Zimmerman (born 1934), former Pennsylvania Attorney General
- Leroy M. Zimmerman (born 1932), former Member of the Pennsylvania House of Representatives

== See also ==
- Roy Zimmerman (disambiguation)
- Zimmerman (disambiguation)
