= Široká Niva =

- Municipality
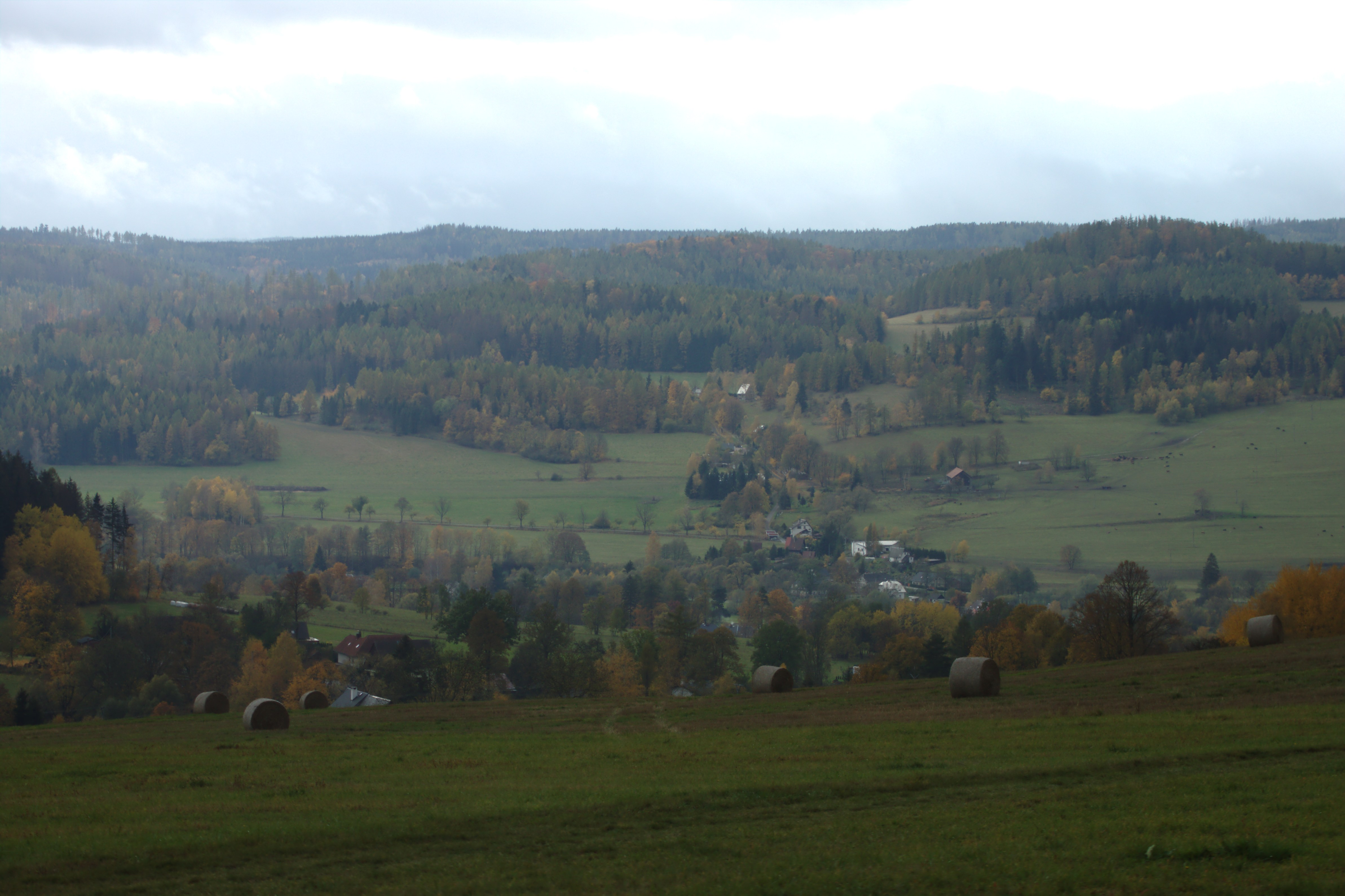
- General view

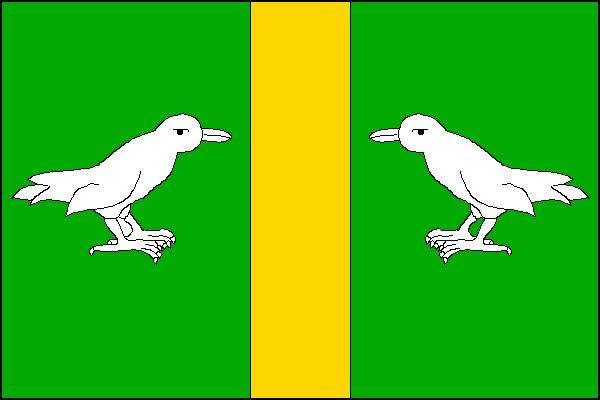
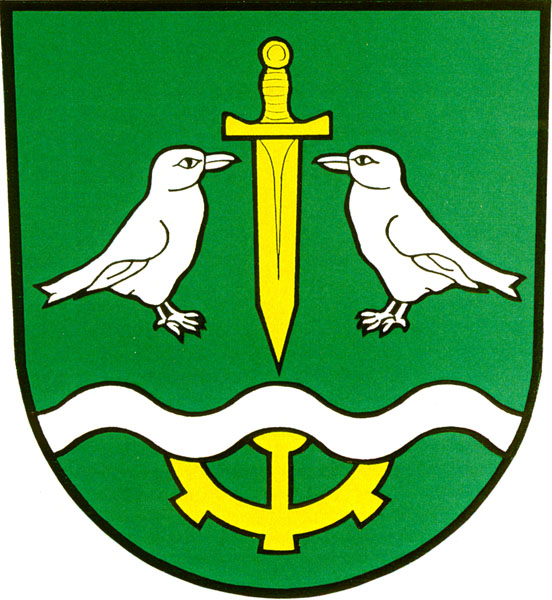
- Flag Coat of arms

- Location in the Czech Republic
- Coordinates: 50°4′3″N 17°29′7″E
- Country: Czech Republic
- Region: Moravian-Silesian
- District: Bruntál
- First mentioned: 1420

Area
  - Total: 37.29 km^{2} (14.40 sq mi)
- Elevation: 368 m (1,207 ft)

Population (2026-01-01)
  - Total: 544
  - Density: 14.6/km^{2} (37.8/sq mi)
- Time zone: UTC+1 (CET)
  - Summer (DST): UTC+2 (CEST)
- Postal code: 793 16
- Website: www.siroka-niva.cz

Široká Niva (until 1952 Bretnov; German: Breitenau) is a municipality and village in Bruntál District in the Moravian-Silesian Region of the Czech Republic. It has about 500 inhabitants.

== Administrative division ==
Široká Niva consists of three municipal parts (in brackets population according to the 2021 census):

- Široká Niva (468)
- Pocheň (22)
- Skrbovice (38)

== Etymology ==
The name literally means 'wide floodplain' in Czech.

== Geography ==
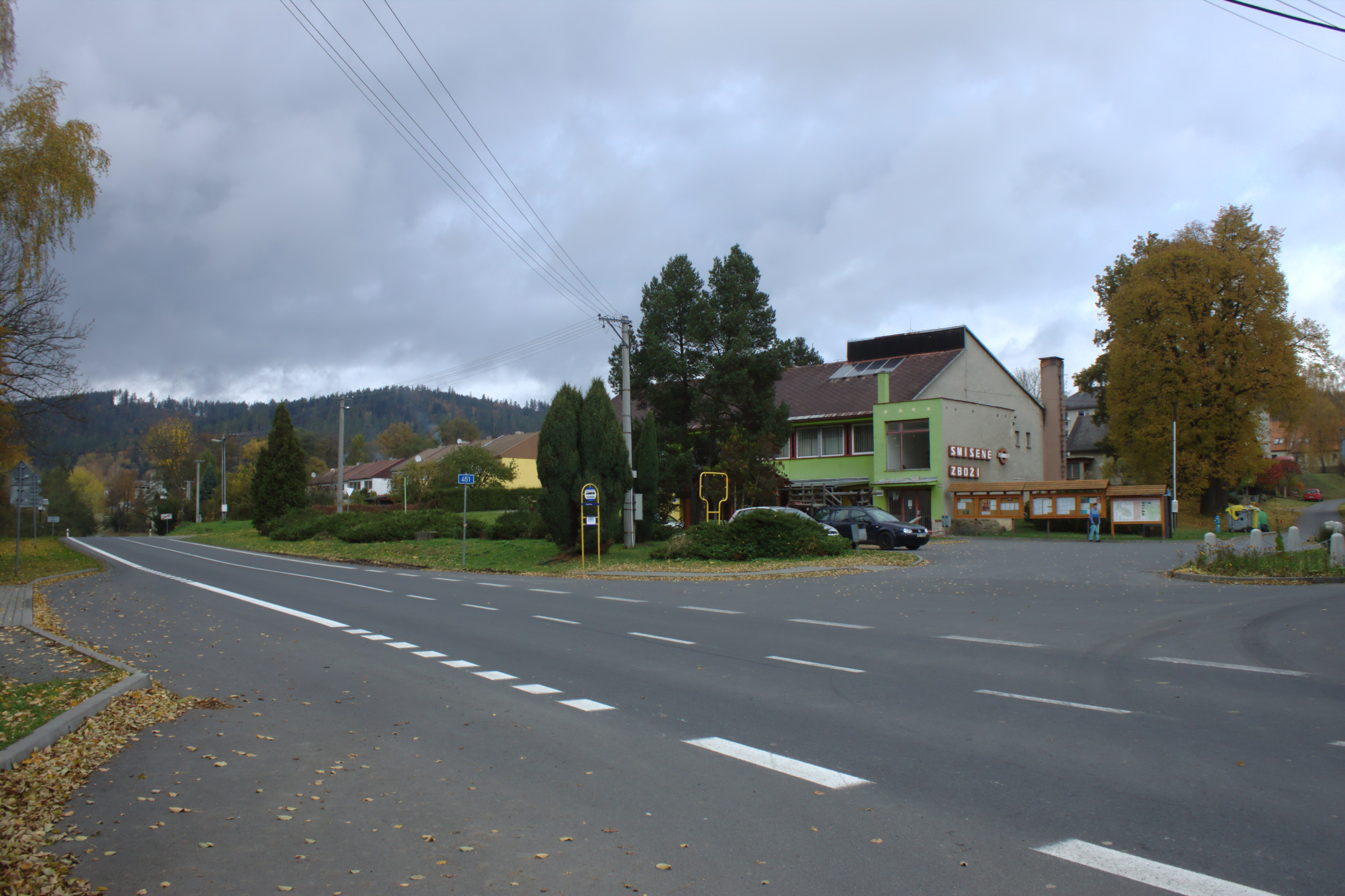
Main street

Široká Niva is located about 8 kilometres (5 mi) north of Bruntál and 54 km (34 mi) north of Olomouc. It lies in the Nízký Jeseník range. The highest point is the hill Zlatý kopec at 693 m (2,274 ft) above sea level. The Opava River flows through the municipality.

== History ==
The first written mention of Markvartice is from 1278 and the first written mention of Bretnov is from 1420. Pocheň was established in 1668. Skrbovice was founded by the Teutonic Order in 1678. In 1949, the municipalities of Markvartice, Bretnov and Skrbovice (including the hamlet of Pocheň) were merged. The new municipality was renamed to its current name Široká Niva in 1952. Today Markvartice is only a local name of a small part of Široká Niva.

== Demographics ==
Historical population

Year	Pop.	±%
1869	1,980	—
1880	2,220	+12.1%
1890	2,143	−3.5%
1900	1,820	−15.1%
1910	1,758	−3.4%

Year	Pop.	±%
1921	2,058	+17.1%
1930	1,704	−17.2%
1950	1,219	−28.5%
1961	922	−24.4%
1970	795	−13.8%

Year	Pop.	±%
1980	634	−20.3%
1991	582	−8.2%
2001	573	−1.5%
2011	569	−0.7%
2021	528	−7.2%

Source: Censuses

== Transport ==
Široká Niva is located on the railway line Vrbno pod Pradědem–Milotice nad Opavou.

== Sights ==
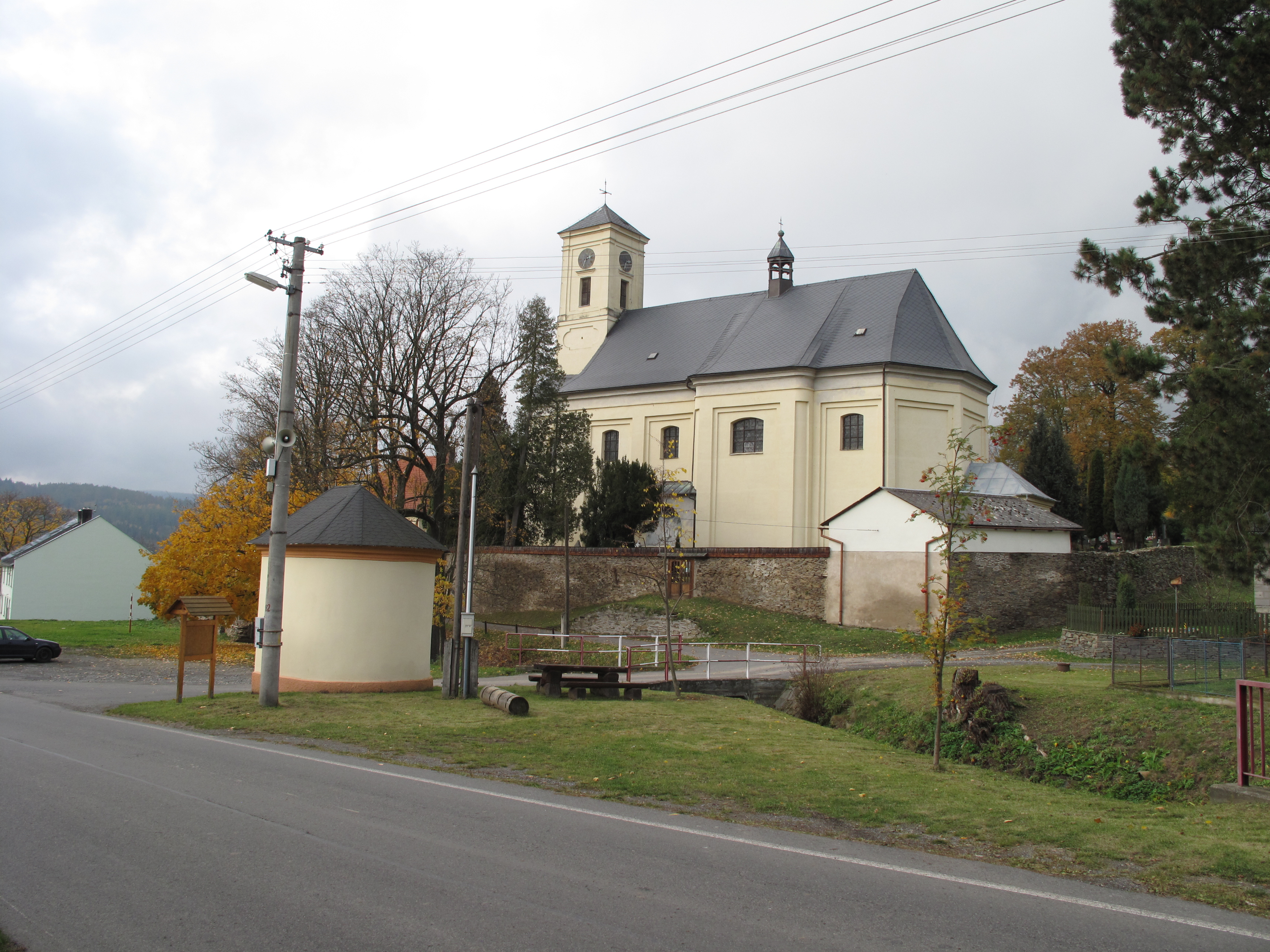
Church of Saint Martin

The main landmark of Široká Niva is the Church of Saint Martin. It was built in the Baroque style in 1718–1721.

== Notable people ==
- Anton Zimmermann (1741–1781), Slovak composer
- Rudolf Koppitz (1884–1936), Austrian photographer
