= Rudolf Koppitz =

Austrian photographer (1884–1936)

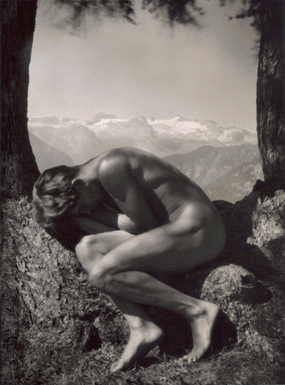
- Rudolf Koppitz, self portrait, In the Bosom of Nature c. 1923.
- Born: 3 January 1884; Skrbovice, Austrian Silesia
- Died: 8 July 1936 (aged 52); Perchtoldsdorf, Austria

Rudolf Koppitz (4 January 1884 – 8 July 1936) was an Austrian photographer. He moved to Vienna and was a Photo-Secessionist whose work includes straight photography and modernist images. He was one of the leading representatives of art photography in Vienna between the world wars. Koppitz is best known for his works of the human figure including his iconic Bewegungsstudie, "Motion Study" and his use of the nude in natural settings.

== Biography ==
Rudolf Koppitz was born into a rural Protestant family in Schreiberseifen, in the Duchy of Upper and Lower Silesia (in what is today Skrbovice, part of Široká Niva near Bruntál in the Czech Republic).

Koppitz began training for his career as a photographer in 1897 under Robert Rotter from Bruntál. Koppitz later continued his work in small commercial studios as a contract photographer but in 1912, he left professional life to go back to school to continue his studies at the Graphische Lehr- und Versuchsanstalt, "Institute for Teaching and Research in Graphic Arts" in Vienna, Austria. Rudolf had been appointed assistant there by 1913.

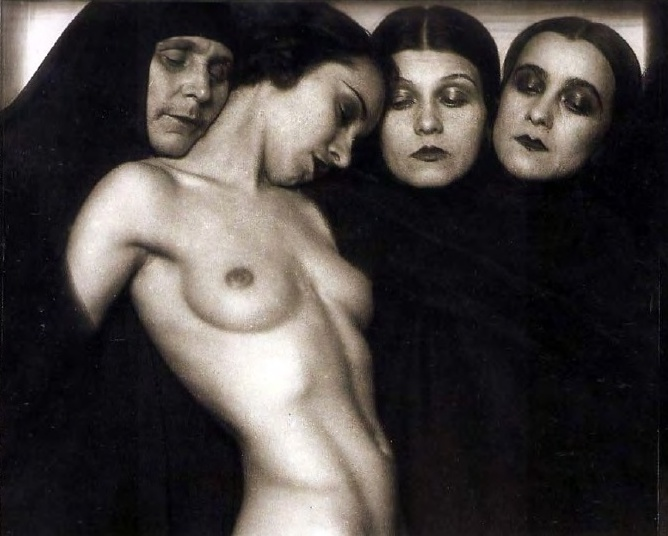
Composition c. 1927

Koppitz's early works were marked by the influence of his teacher, the Czech Symbolist photographer Karel Novák, and by the style of the Viennese Secession. While working in Vienna early in his career, Koppitz photographed many of the picturesque aspects of the city - St. Stephen's Cathedral, Karl's Church - and traveled to photograph Hungarian villages, fishing boats near Delft, views of Dresden and alpine landscapes.

— The Brown University News Bureau

His time at the Institute was interrupted by the First World War in which Koppitz his talents were put to use as a field and aerial reconnaissance photographer. The bulk of the body of work he produced during this time consisted of landscapes captured during his aerial reconnaissance work, his favorite of which was the study of water from the air and the geometric elements of flying machines that carried him into war. When Koppitz was not photographing for the Army he spent his time documenting the lives of soldiers and the communities of people he came into contact with. Photographs from this period are laden with dramatic sentiments due to Koppitz's use of light, the sun, clouds and mist to express the emotions of the people and the time.

Returning to the institute, Koppitz met Anna Arbeitlang who studied photography there. She had become an assistant in 1917, like Koppitz, in the year she was admitted to the Vienna Photographic Society. She went on to become assistant lecturer, and Rudolf a professor in 1919, a role in which he remained for twenty years. In 1920, Arbeitlang founded a studio in the fifth district of Vienna where from 1921 Rudolf Koppitz was a partner. They married in the summer of 1923 and the studio thenceforth traded under his name. They worked together on their artistic commissions, publications and projects. She was also Rudolf's assistant on his artistic work, his photo retoucher and collaborated with him in making his first nude studies, some of his 'self-portraits,' and was often his model. Both Rudolf and Anna produced Kunstphotographie (as Pictorialism was called in Austria) in the aesthetics of the Vienna Secession, Jugendstijl, and the Wiener Werkstätte.

In the year they married, Rudolf made, probably in collaboration with Anna, the nude self-portrait, In the Bosom of Nature, in which he is framed by tree trunks, rocks, snowy mountains. It is posed to convey a dreamlike harmony reminiscent of a symbolist painting and graphic art. In c.1925 Koppitz created his masterpiece, Bewegungsstudie, "Motion Study" in which he photographed dancers from the Vienna State Opera; the nude dancer, credited to be the Russian Claudia Issatschenko but is more likely, her daughter, ballet dancer and choreographer, Tatyana Issatschenko Gsovsky, with her head thrown dramatically back and flanked by three dark-robed women, lends Bewegungsstudie to the highly decorative and symbolist tradition of the Viennese Jugendstil.

Also in 1925 the couple had their only child, daughter Liselotte, portrayed with her mother in Rudolf's Madonna and Child image of that year. Julia Secklehner identifies it, and Koppitz's 'self-portrait' nude In the Bosom of Nature as adhering to the Körperkult ('cult of the body') and the naturist heimat sentiment in its alpine setting and heroic low-angle viewpoint.

In the 1930s their style shifted toward the Neue Sachlichkeit, anti-expressionist objectivity then predominant in photography of Central Europe. The FiFo ("Internationale Ausstellung des Deutschen Werkbundes – Film und Foto") came to Vienna after being shown in Stuttgart and decisively influenced the Koppitz couple's artistic development. The Neues Sehen (New Vision) led them to a more factual and documentary oriented photography of themes from rustic life; ethnographic records of the peasant archetype, eulogised as the archaic essence of Germanic peoples, at first mystical and quasi-theosophical, but progressively more chauvinist and nationalistic under the Austrian chancellor dictatorship initiated by Engelbert Dollfuss of 1933.

In 1936, the most comprehensive exhibition of Rudolf's work, a survey of 500 works of rustic subjects took place, entitled "Country and People", at the Museum of Art and Industry. Rudolf died that same year.

Anna continued operation of their studio and produced Nazi propaganda imagery for Minister of Agriculture R. Walther Darré. Whether Rudolf's sympathies accorded with the National Socialists is not known, however völkisch ideologies, those embedded in the couple's imagery, were instrumental to Nazism.

== Work ==
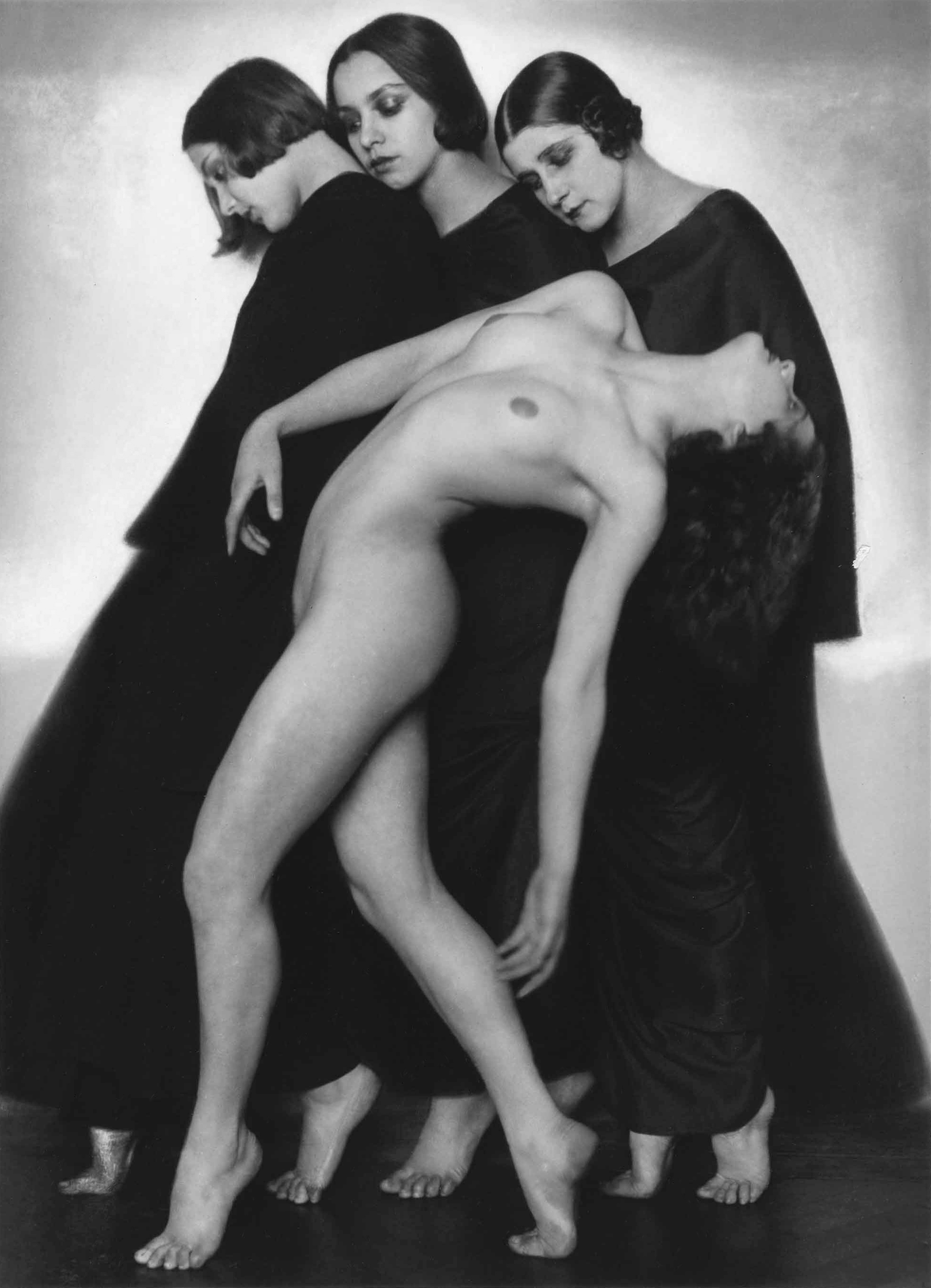
Bewegungsstudie c. 1927

Koppitz's work emphasises form, line, and the surface play of light and shadow. Early in his career, Koppitz was known for staging groups of subjects in the stylised, bas-relief style of the Vienna Secession, the most well known example of this being his Bewegungsstudie, "Motion Study".

'Bewegungsstudie' (Motion Study) is surely the most widely published and best known image in Austrian photography from the early decades of the last century. This is for good reason, as no photograph better captures the cultural strands that characterized the Austrian avant-garde at that time. Here one can see a graphic strength and compositional clarity that reflects the modernist ambitions initiated in the fine as in the applied arts by the Secession and by the Wiener Werkstätte. But what gives the image its power is the aura of mystery, of symbolist sensuality that resonates through this enigmatic grouping of the three uniformly coiffed and draped figures and the one single naked figure.

— Christies

Bewegungsstudie's nude, robed women and sensuality, in the context of its composition, evokes the sexual morbidity of Viennese artists like Gustav Klimt and Alphonse Mucha, as well as the Swiss symbolist painter Ferdinand Hodler. It has become Koppitz's signature image and also his best-seller. Prints were purchased by, among others, the Toledo Museum of Art; the New York Camera Club notably Joseph Bing, head of that club's print committee; and the Englishman Stephen Tyng, who published it in a small portfolio of works from his collection.

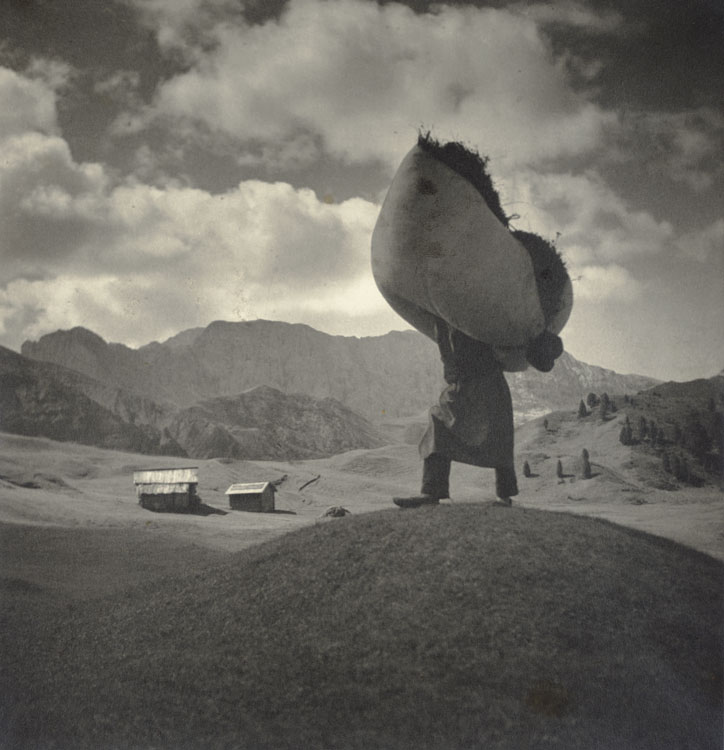
Heavy Burden c. 1930

His earliest works show evidence of influence by Gustav Klimt, Japanese art, Art Nouveau and Constructivism. Koppitz's work came of age during the inter-war period when most of Austria's photographers were supporters of art photography. Photographs from that time are full of symbolic meanings often capturing nude and clothed dancers as well as liberal use of the both male, many of which were of Koppitz himself, and female nudes placed in elements of nature and posed to give the impression of a Greek or Roman statue.

Koppitz's nude self-portraits fascinated his contemporaries as much as they do viewers today. The photographs were taken out of doors--high in the mountains of the Alps or at the seashore--with the assistance of his wife, Anna. Often symbolic, his images reflected the enthusiasm for nature that Koppitz nurtured throughout his life. This love of nature also influenced his late work, his portrayal of peasant life in Tyrol that culminated in the vast 1936 exhibition of 500 photographs called "Land und Leute" (Country and People).

— Idao Gallery

Although he did not possess a consistent style, Koppitz was a virtuoso of the dark room, seemingly determined to make the photograph as much of an art object as possible. His beautifully grainy, subtly tinted images align him with American Pictorialists like Edward Steichen and Clarence Smith. Koppitz's work, much of it using the gum bichromate process, reflected his links with modern artists such as Gustav Klimt and Egon Schiele, and their involvement with the 'life reform' movement including; nudism, sun culture, and expressive dance popular in Central Europe from the early 1900s as well as agrarian romanticism. Koppitz's mastery of pictorial processes—pigment, carbon, gum, and bromoil process of transfer printing—gained the respect of his colleagues throughout the world and garnered mention in the Encyclopædia Britannica of 1929.

Koppitz's photographs were shown in no less than fourteen juried or invitational exhibitions in the United States from 1926 through 1930, most importantly the Pittsburgh Salons of 1926, 1927, and 1928. This highly regarded annual exhibition at the Carnegie Museum of Art featured not only prominent American photographers, but also the Europeans including; Koppitz, Josef Sudek, Jaromir Funke, Frantisek Drtikol, and Madame D'Ora. Both Koppitz and Thorek were elected associate members of this prestigious salon, where Bewegungsstudie, along with many other Koppitz works, were exhibited. In addition to their exposure in salons, Koppitz's photographs were featured in such American camera magazines as American Photography, Photo-Era, and Camera Craft.

Koppitz's later photographs adopted a simpler, more direct approach in terms of their subject matter and composition, more in accord with New Objectivity, while retaining emotional resonance. Over the course of 30 years of work, Koppitz's photography came full circle returning in his later years to where he started, working with a renewed focus on nature and documenting the lives and condition of rural peasants. Koppitz is perceived by some as a progressive modern artist while on the other hand he was one of the more conservative photographers in his time, belatedly adopting the prevailing Neues Sehen of the 1930s, but holding true to a number of traditions and always telling a story with his photographs.

== See also ==
- Iconography
