= Rudolf Bode =

German composer

- Born: 3 February 1881; Kiel, Germany
- Died: 7 October 1970 (aged 89); Munich, Germany
- Occupations: educationalist and founder of expressive gymnastics

Rudolf Fritz Karl Berthold Bode (3 February 1881 – 7 October 1970) was a German educator and founder of expressive gymnastics His central concerns were holistic movement, its rhythmic design and the interaction of body and soul. He was an active supporter and propagandist for National Socialism from the early 1930s.

== Education ==
Bode, son of a Kiel merchant, studied at the Leipzig Conservatory from 1901 to 1904 and at the same time from 1901 to 1906 at the university there, completing his studies in 1906 with a dissertation on the time thresholds for tuning fork tones of medium and low intensity.

He worked first as a pianist, 1907-1908 as a répétiteur at the Stadttheater Kiel, 1908-1909 as Kapellmeister at the Stadttheater Kaiserslautern, 1909-1910 as Kapellmeister and choir director at the Stadttheater Heidelberg and 1910-1911 as a teacher at the educational institution of Émile Jaques-Dalcroze in Hellerau.

== The Bode schools ==
Rudolf Bode and Elly Drenkmann married in 1909. In October 1911, they founded the Bode School of Rhythm Gymnastics in Munich, now the oldest school for gymnastics in Germany, where he also taught piano and music theory. Bode competed in artistic performance in the 1932 Olympics. On 11 August 1922, the "Bodebund für Körpererziehung" was founded in Jena with Heinrich Medau as chairman.

The Bode Federation expanded quite quickly in the following period, so that in addition to the school in Munich in Berlin, Bremen and Wroclaw, other venues were created. In the spring of 1925, his teachers were providing courses in 26 cities; some of them were attended by over a hundred participants. In his writing Rhythm and Physical Education, he referred in particular to Ludwig Klages’ theories.

== Supporter of Nazism ==
Bode joined the NSDAP in 1932. During the time of National Socialism, Bode was head of the symphonymatics and dance student council in the Reich Association of German gymnastics, sports and gymnastics teachers. In 1933, he became specialist group leader in the Fighting Federation for German Culture. In 1935, he became specialist director of the Reich School of the Reichsnährstand in Burg Neuhaus near Braunschweig until the school closed in 1939, while Elly, who worked in partnership with Rudolf, took over the management of the Bode School from 1935, from which the educational institution for German dance developed in Munich from 1938.

At the Nazi Burg Neuhaus 'agricultural school' (the “Reich School of the Reichsnährstand for Physical Exercises”), Bode developed special gymnastics for Minister of Agriculture R. Walther Darré who promoted Nordic racial purity through eugenics and the “New nobility of blood and soil.”. Darré appointed the photographers Anna Koppitz and German sports photographer Hanns Spudich to produce pictures of the hand-picked young peasant farmers exercising for Bode's publication Neuhaus gymnastik, issued in several editions. The pictures appeared in the June 1939 Die 5. Reichsnährstands-Ausstellung ("5th Reich nutrition exhibition") in Leipzig and in Odal, the organ of Nazi propaganda. His 1933 The spiritual foundations of dance in the National Socialist state predates his activities at Neuhaus and confirms his alliance to Nazism. Consequently, after the war, Bode was classified as a Nazi follower.

== Post-war career ==
In 1948 Bode reestablished the "Bodebund für Rhythmische Gymnastics". On 1 October 1951 the Bode School reopened in Munich. On 31 March 1970, the school conducted its first course in jazz gymnastics in Munich and Bode died 7 October that year.

== Expressive gymnastics ==
Rudolf Bode believed original natural movement could be lost due to incorrect education or persistent unilateral activity. To restore the natural course of movement as an expression of inner experience was to be the task of gymnastics, an idea based on principles he established;

- The law of holisticism, in which movements start from the centre of gravity, the trunk, and are transmitted to the whole body. The whole person is involved in every movement. Inner experience finds its expression in the holistic movement.
- The law of rhythmic change; the alternation of tension and relaxation in movement and the three-phase of the movement sequence. Each movement is divided into the impulse for movement (start), discharge (emphasis) and end (exit movement, cycle).
- The law of economics; holistic movement achieves the highest performance with relatively low effort.
- The law of physical-mental interaction with the principle of expression; interaction of experience and movement, from inside and outside, leads to the expressive gymnastics.
- The swing movements created by Bode demonstrate these laws; swing movements capture the whole person who moves economically between tension and relaxation in the course of the three phases.

== Publications ==
- Aufgaben und Ziele der rhythmischen Gymnastik (Tasks and goals of rhythmic gymnastics) Verlag der ärztlichen Rundschau Otto Gmelin, München 1913, 2. Auflage C.H. Beck´sche Verlagsbuchhandlung München 1923, 3. Auflage 1933
- Der Rhythmus uns seine Bedeutung für die Erziehung ("Rhythm and its importance in education") Verlag Eugen Diederichs, Jena 1920.
- Ausdrucksgymnastik C.H. Beck´sche Verlagsbuchhandlung, München 1922, 2. Auflage 1924, 3. Auflage 1925, 4. Auflage 1926, 5. Auflage 1933, holländische Übersetzung Uitdrukkingsgymnastiek 1923, englische Übersetzung Expression-Gymnastics 1931.
- Rhythmus und Körpererziehung Verlag Eugen Diederichs, Jena 1923, 2. Auflage 1925.
- Das Lebendige in der Leibeserziehung C.H. Beck´sche Verlagsbuchhandlung, München 1925.
- Neue Wege in der Leibeserziehung C.H. Beck´sche Verlagsbuchhandlung, München 1926.
- Musik und Bewegung Bärenreiter Verlag, Kassel 1930, 2. Auflage Chr. Friedrich Vieweg, Berlin 1942, 3. Auflage Wilhelm Limpert Verlag, Frankfurt/Main 1953, 4. Auflage Walter Kögler Verlag, Stuttgart 1967.
- Die Grundübungen der körperlichen Bildung Bärenreiter-Verlag, Kassel 1930, 2. Auflage 1936.
- Rhythmus und Anschlag C.H. Beck´sche Verlagsbuchhandlung, München 1933.
- Bewegung und Gestaltung. Von den Kulturaufgaben der körperlichen Erziehung. Widukind-Verlag, Berlin 1936.
- Energie und Rhythmus Blut und Boden Verlag, Goslar 1939.
- Neuhaus-Gymnastik Blut und Boden Verlag, Goslar 1943.
- Rhythmische Gymnastik W. Limpert Verlag, Frankfurt/Main 1953, 2. Auflage 1957.
