= Zimmerer =

Zimmerer (German for "carpenter") is a German surname. Notable people with the surname include:

- Andrea Zimmerer (born 1965), German para table tennis player
- Eugen von Zimmerer (1843–1918), German colonial governor, attorney, prosecutor, and judge
- Jürgen Zimmerer (born 1965), German historian and Africanist
- Wolfgang Zimmerer (born 1940), German bobsledder

== See also ==
- John and Philomena Sand Zimmerer House, Seward, Nebraska, United States
- Zimmer (surname)
