= Cymerman =

Cymerman is a Polish surname of German origin. It is an occupational surname, deriving from Polish cymerman ("carpenter"), which is a loanword from German Zimmermann. There were 1803 people with this surname in Poland as of 2002.

Notable people with the surname include:

- Claude Cymerman (born 1947), French classical pianist
- Elżbieta Franke-Cymerman (born 1940), Polish fencer
- Henrique Cymerman (born 1959), Portuguese journalist
