= The Foremen =

American satirical folk music band

- Origin: Los Angeles
- Genres: Folk music
- Years active: 1990–1996
- Labels: Reprise Records
- Members: Roy Zimmerman, Kenny Rhodes, Doug Whitney, Andy Corwin

The Foremen were a satirical folk music band from Los Angeles founded by Roy Zimmerman. They were known for their politically charged lyrics, which usually discussed United States politics from a left-wing point of view, such as by mocking Rush Limbaugh.

== History ==
Zimmerman originally started the band in 1990, after seeing a Wayfarers album in the bargain bin at a record store. He then recruited Doug Whitney and Andy Corwin—a guitarist and bassist, respectively—to join his newly formed band. The band released a live album, Sing it Loud, on Metaphor Records, and were signed to Reprise Records after Jim Ed Norman, then head of the Warner Bros. Nashville label, heard them at a party. Norman was so impressed that he signed the Foremen to a recording contract on Reprise, one of Warner Music's subsidiaries, and went on to produce their debut album. It was on Reprise that they released both of their studio albums, Folk Heroes (1995) and What's Left (1996). They also released a single from the former album, "Ain't No Liberal", in 1995, which featured an image of Republican politician Phil Gramm on the cover. Reprise promoted the single by sending copies of it to presidential candidates in the 1996 US Presidential election, and mocking presidential candidate Pete Wilson in the single's cover art. Reprise's then-president, Howie Klein, admitted that their motivation for doing this was to provoke a "counterattack" from one of the politicians they were mocking. In February 1996, the band performed a song mocking Oliver North, entitled "Ollie, Ollie, Off Scot Free", on North's own radio show. While the band was nervous prior to this performance, North's reaction was not as negative as they had expected. He didn't care very much what the song said, only that it was about him, according to Zimmerman. North also described the band as a "very weird group" and agreed to pose for a picture with them. By 1997, Zimmerman had left the group, being replaced by actor/musician Lance Guest.

== Style ==
Zimmerman has said that the political views expressed in his band's songs are influenced in part by the activism popular in the 1960s, and has named "Tom Lehrer and Phil Ochs and, to a lesser degree, I guess, [...] Pete Seeger and the honest-to-God activism that was going on in music at that time [i.e. the 1960s]" as his band's influences. Whitney has also described the band as "partly a goof on the lesser folk groups of the late '50s," while Billboard magazine has compared the satirical aspects of the Foremen's music to Allan Sherman. Jim Walsh has concurred with Zimmerman that the Foremen's music resembles that of Phil Ochs, as well as naming Steve Goodman as one of their influences. Mark Jenkins of the Washington Post wrote that "Though the Foremen's "Folk Heroes" arrives with an endorsement from '60s musical satirist Tom Lehrer, it's not especially folkie—nor so biting as Lehrer's best."

== Discography ==
=== Studio albums ===
- Folk Heroes (Reprise, 1995)
- What's Left? (Reprise, 1996)

=== Live albums ===
- Sing it Loud! (Metaphor, 1994)
