= Paul Zimmerman =

Paul Zimmerman or Zimmermann may refer to:

- Paul Zimmerman (sportswriter) (1932–2018), American sportswriter
- Paul Zimmerman (politician) (born 1958), Dutch-born Hong Kong environmentalist
- Paul D. Zimmerman (1938–1993), American screenwriter, film critic, and activist
- Paul Zimmermann (SS officer) (1895–1980), German SS-Brigadeführer
- Paul Zimmermann (blacksmith) (born 1939), German blacksmith who created contemporary forge work
- Paul Zimmermann (mathematician) (born 1964), French computational mathematician

== See also ==
- Paul Zimmer (disambiguation)
