= Zimmerman =

Zimmerman may refer to:

- Zimmerman (surname), a surname and a list of people with the name
- Zimmerman, Ontario, Canada
- Zimmerman, Nairobi, a suburb
- Zimmerman, Minnesota, U.S., a city in Sherburne County
- Zimmerman, Pennsylvania, U.S., an unincorporated community in Somerset County

== See also ==
- Justice Zimmerman (disambiguation)
- Zimerman, a surname and a list of people with the name
- Zimmerman Island, Wilkes Land, Antarctica
- Zimmerman Kame, an archeological site in Hardin County, Ohio
- Zimmermann (disambiguation)
- Zimmer (disambiguation)
