= Zimmermann (disambiguation) =

Zimmermann is a German-language surname.

Zimmermann may also refer to:

- Zimmermann (fashion label), an Australian clothing brand
- Zimmermann (piano), a German piano company
- Zimmermann (publisher), a German sheet-music publisher

== See also ==
- Zimmermann telegram, a telegram sent by Germany and intended for Mexico, but was intercepted and ultimately led to the entry of the United States into World War I
- Zimmermann reaction, a chemical reaction to test for ketosteroids
- Zimerman
- Zimmerman (disambiguation)
