= Anna Koppitz =

Austrian photographer

Anna Koppitz (née Arbeitlang; 1895–1989) was a mid-century Austrian photographer.

== Early life and education ==
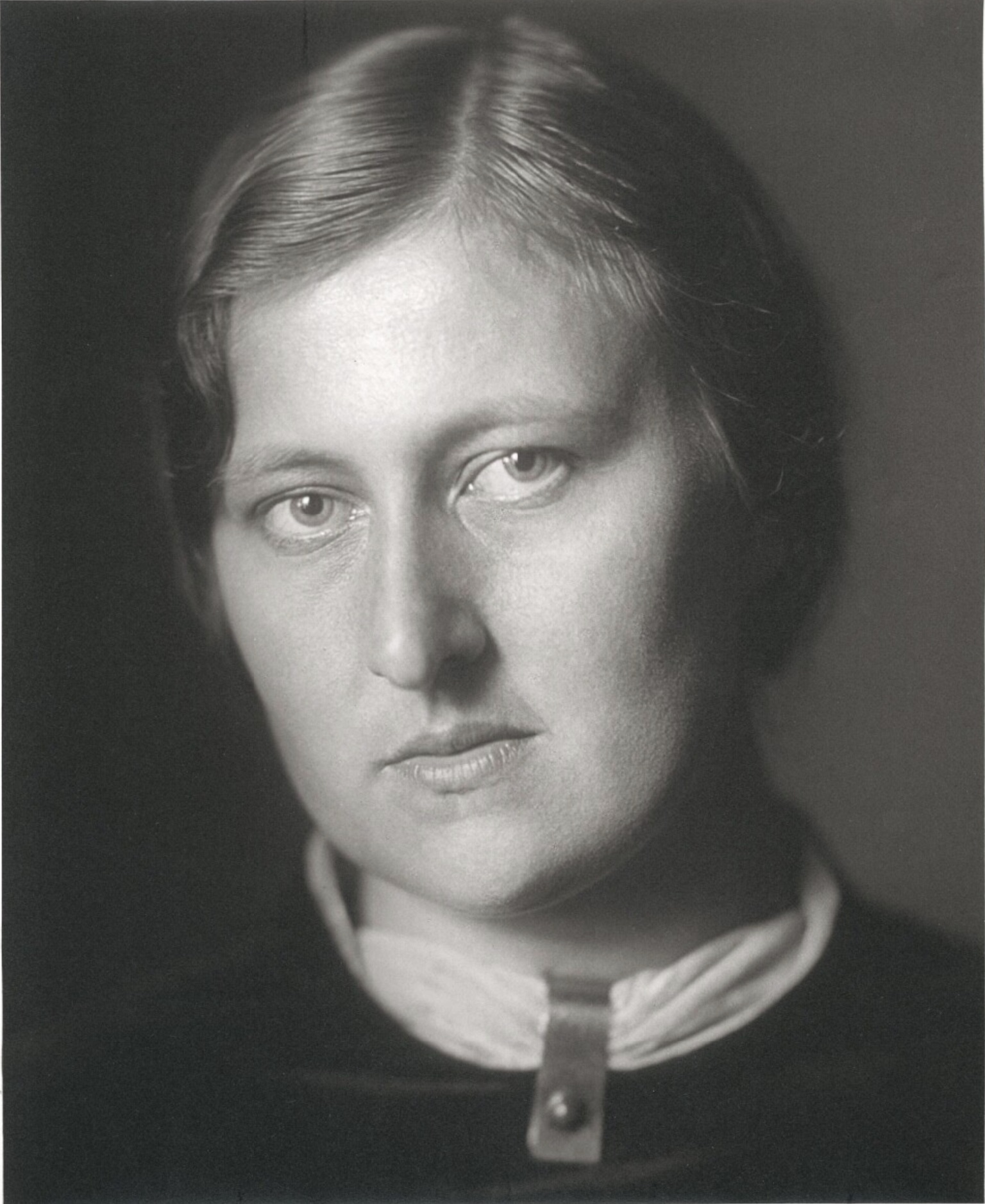
Rudolf Koppitz (c.1930) Anna Koppitz, Pigment print, 29.9 x 24.5 cm

Anna Koppitz was born Anna Arbeitlang, in Austria or Germany, in 1895. She studied photography at the Graphische Lehr und Versuchsanstalt in Vienna, founded by specialist in photographic chemistry Josef Maria Eder (1855–1944), where she became an assistant in 1917, alongside Rudolf Koppitz. Rudolf had been appointed assistant in 1913 before enlisting for the war and serving as a field and aerial photographer.

== Photographer ==
In 1917 Arbeitlang joined the Vienna Photographic Society, in the same intake as cinematographer Hans Theyer, and with Emmy Jenny, Anna Scüos, Irene Mayor and Emmy Milde. She went on to become assistant lecturer, and Rudolf a professor in 1919, a role in which he remained for twenty years.

In 1920, Arbeitlang founded a studio in the fifth district of Vienna where from 1921 Rudolf Koppitz was a partner. They married in the summer of 1923 and the studio only traded under his name. They worked together on their artistic commissions, publications and projects. She was also Rudolf's assistant on his artistic work, his photo retoucher and collaborated with him in making his first nude studies, some of his 'self-portraits,' and was often his model.

From 1908 the influence of the fine arts had been evident in Rudolf's imagery, especially that of Gustav Klimt, and he exaggerated the formalism of Jugendstil; both he and Anna produced Kunstphotographie (as pictorialism was called in Austria) in the aesthetics of the Vienna Secession, the Austrian Art Nouveau, and the Wiener Werkstätte.

== Aesthetic ==
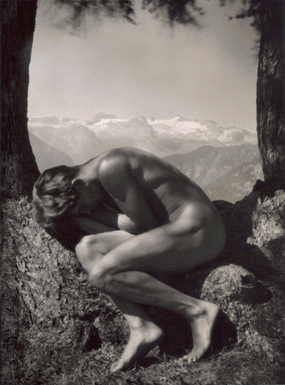
Rudolf and Anna Koppitz (1923) In the Arms of Nature, Multicolour gum bichromate, printed 1923

In 1925 the couple had one daughter, Liselotte, portrayed with her mother in a Madonna and Child image of that year. Julia Secklehner identifies it, and Koppitz's 'self-portrait' nude In the Arms of Nature, most likely a collaborative effort by the couple, as adhering to the Körperkult ('cult of the body') and the naturist heimat sentiment in its alpine setting and heroic low-angle viewpoint.

In the 1930s their style shifted toward the Neue Sachlichkeit, anti-expressionist objectivity then predominant in photography of Central Europe. The FiFo ("Internationale Ausstellung des Deutschen Werkbundes – Film und Foto") came to Vienna after being shown in Stuttgart and decisively influenced the Koppitz couple's artistic development. The Neues Sehen (New Vision) led them to a more factual and documentary oriented photography of themes from rustic life; ethnographic records of the peasant archetype, eulogised as the archaic essence of Germanic peoples, at first mystical and quasi-theosophical, but progressively more chauvinist and nationalistic under the Austrian chancellor dictatorship initiated by Engelbert Dollfuss of 1933. In 1936, the most comprehensive exhibition of Rudolf's work, a survey of 500 works of rustic subjects took place, entitled "Country and People", at the Museum of Art and Industry. Rudolf died that same year.

Also in 1936 Adolf Hitler remilitarised western German lands near the Rhine River and the eastern border of France, a provocation that defied the terms of the Versailles Treaty, which had prohibited Germany from keeping troops in that territory. His death may have saved Rudolf's considerable reputation as a highly regarded art photographer; whether he favoured Hitler has not been discovered. However völkisch ideologies, those embedded in the couple's imagery, were instrumental to Nazism.

== Reich School series ==
Anna's sympathies however were compromised when she agreed, in writing that has been preserved, to make Nazi propaganda for Minister of Agriculture R. Walther Darré. Believing Rudolf to be still alive, he wrote to the couple's studio to commission him, since the symbolically charged peasant pictures had been noticed by the Nazis. Anna replied, and so began the major commission of her life.

At the Nazi 'farming school' in Burg Neuhaus, the "Reich School of the Reichsnährstand for Physical Exercises" Darré promoted Nordic racial purity through eugenics and the "New nobility of blood and soil."

Anna was to illustrate the experiment, and in 1939, alongside German sports photographer Hanns Spudich, she made heroic pictures of the young, "racially pure" bodies of the young farmers from the Bauernschaft peasantry, enhancing their appearance, showing them sometimes in iconic traditional costumes, but usually pure white leotards, thus dissociated from agricultural labour, and made attractive and athletic according to Darré's specifications.

Often using only the sky photographed through a yellow or orange filter as a background, she followed the successful Koppitz formula to show them performing peasant dances, playing ball games, competing in archery, spear throwing, and in coordinated exercises developed for Neuhaus by Nazi gymnastics ideologist Rudolf Bode. The photos appeared in Bode's gymnastics book, in Die 5. Reichsnährstands-Ausstellung 1939 ("5th Reich nutrition exhibition"), Leipzig, 4–11 June 1939, and in Odal, the organ of Nazi propaganda, thereby avoiding any inglorious association with discredited 'fine art'.

At the end of 1939 Darré founded the "Working Group for the selection of racial élites and procreation science" to breed a German super-race from peasant stock. He asked Koppitz if she would be happy to undertake nude photography of his subjects, not erotic, or 'artistic,' but to demonstrate flawless 'racial' attributes.

Koppitz would have accepted the brief, had Darré not fallen out of favour with Heinrich Himmler and been forced to resign "for health reasons", and in 1940, she wrote:

"I was happy to promise your minister to work on the blood issue. Whether portrait or nude photography comes down to the same thing for me; it is only difficult to find the right people."

While Anna has not been shown to be a subscribed member of the National Socialists, Magdalena Vuković, editor of Serving racial politics : Anna Koppitz's photographs for Reich Minister R. Walther Darré and its texts by Elke Fuchs, Gesine Gerhard and Vuković reveal that Anna had willingly pursued political commissions after the Anschluss, and confirm that hers was the propaganda that projected utopian notions of a Nordic Race and German supremacy that justified their destruction of 'inferior' peoples.

== Later life ==
After Rudolf's death, Anna had continued to run the studio until just after the war, producing illustration photography, architecture, rural subjects and nude photography. She lived to the age of 94, though few of her later images survive, and little else about her post-war life is recorded. Her daughter Liselotte Tavs-Koppitz (1925–2011) worked in her mother's studio, which she took over in 1947 and ran until around 1965. From 1949 to 1953 she was, as both her parents had been, an assistant at the Graphic Teaching and Research Institute, then concentrated on industrial and commercial photography and artist portraits. Married in 1960, and after the birth of her son in 1961 Tavs-Koppitz ended her photographic work.

Tavs-Koppitz's works, included with her parents' in a show Photographs 1910–1960 at Galerie Johannes Faber, Vienna, in September 2013, were those from the 1950s and 1960s; modernist, some applied to commercial purpose, distant from politics and oblique in representing the figure, but with the same idealising impulse.

== Exhibitions ==
- Die 5. Reichsnährstands-Ausstellung 1939 ("5th Reich nutrition exhibition"), Leipzig, 4–11 June 1939
- Anna Koppitz, Rudolf Koppitz, Liselotte Tavs-Koppitz : Photographs 1910–1960, Galerie Johannes Faber, Austria, 7 September 2013
- In the service of the racial question. Propaganda photographs commissioned by Reich Minister R. Walther Darré Bonartes Photoinstitut in cooperation with the Topography of Terror Foundation, 29 November 2017 – 8 April 2018

== Publications ==
- Bode, Rudolf (1940). Neuhaus-gymnastik, mit 60 aufnahmen (in German). Goslar: Verlag Blut und boden. OCLC 43366966.
