= William Timmerman =

- Education: Duke University
- Known for: CEO of SCANA Corporation

William "Bill" Timmerman was the chairman, President and CEO of SCANA Corporation from March 2007 to November 2011.

== Early life and career ==
Timmerman received a bachelor's degree in accounting from Duke University in 1968.

Timmerman started his career with Arthur Andersen as a Certified Public Accountant.

Timmerman began his career at SCANA in 1978 as a senior vice president of finance and administration for Carolina Energies. Carolina Energies later merged with South Carolina Electric & Gas Company to form SCANA Corporation, where he became vice president of finance. In 1983, he was elected chief financial officer. He then became senior vice president and executive vice president. Elected to the SCANA board in 1991, he became president in 1995 and chief operating officer in 1996. Timmerman has been chairman, president and CEO since March 1997. He retired from the company in November 2011.
