= Andreas Zimmer =

Andreas Zimmer is Professor of Neurobiology and Director of the Institute for Molecular Psychiatry at the University of Bonn; he was previously professor at Bielefeld University and a researcher at the National Institute of Mental Health. He is perhaps best known in the field of cannabinoid research. His most cited paper on this subject, in Proceedings of the National Academy of Sciences, has been cited 323 times. He has also done major work in the genetic sequencing of the genes for the function of the nervous system. His most widely cited paper in this subject in Nature Genetics, has been cited 262 times. He has produced more than 121 research articles, as shown in Web of Science.
