= Matt Zimmerman =

Matt Zimmerman may refer to:

- Matt Zimmerman (actor) (1934–2022), Canadian actor best known as the voice of Alan Tracy in Thunderbirds
- Matt Zimmerman (basketball), assistant basketball coach at the University of Arkansas
