= David Zimmer (disambiguation) =

David Zimmer (born 1944) is a politician in Ontario, Canada.

David Zimmer may also refer to:

- David Zimmer, main character in The Book of Illusions
- David Zimmer, Best Oralist winner and Best Overall Team member in the 2008 Ames Moot Court Competition
