= Lawrence J. Timmerman Airport =

Airport in Wisconsin, United States of America

Coordinates: 43°06′37″N 088°02′04″W

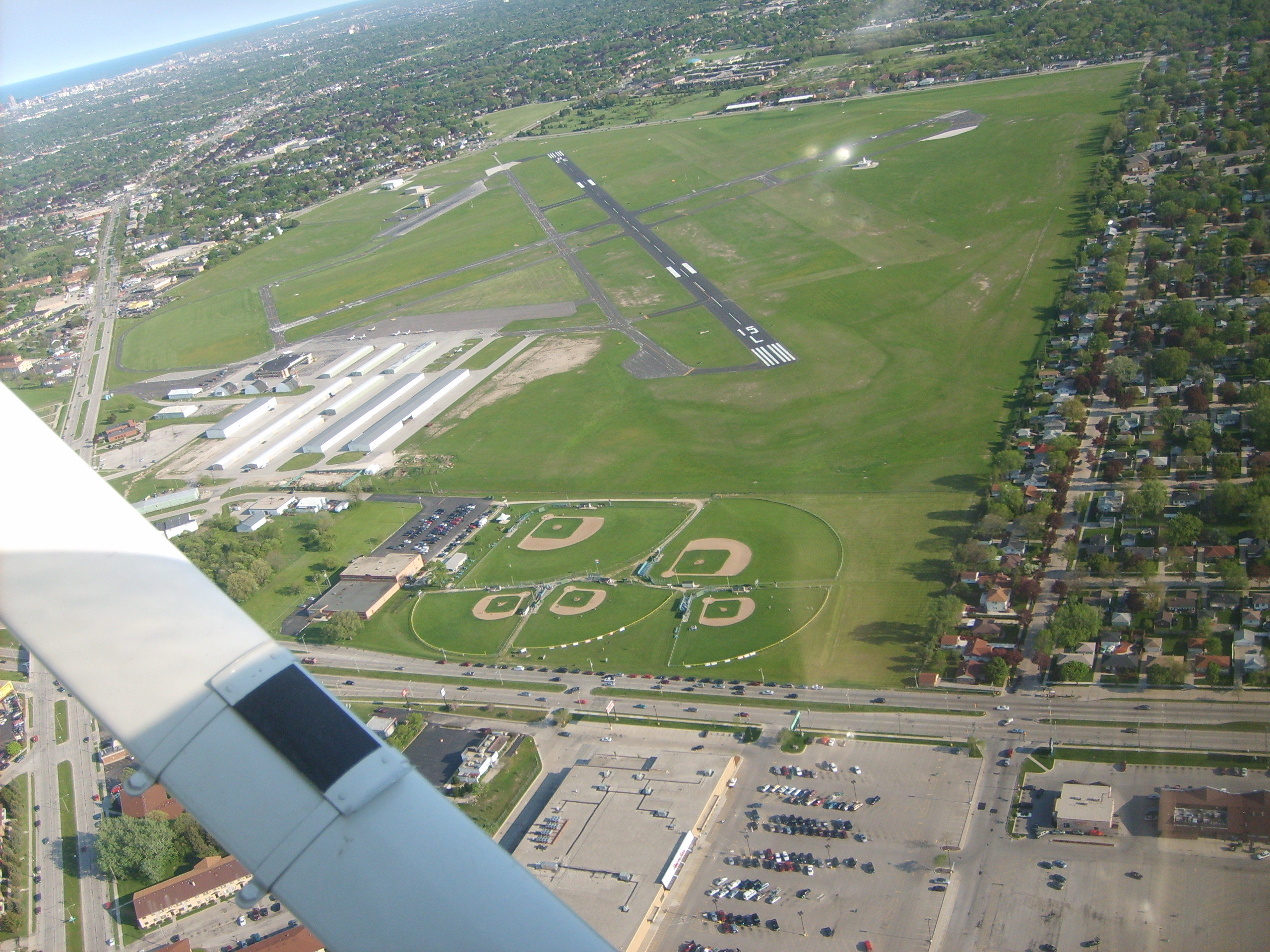
- IATA: MWC; ICAO: KMWC; FAA LID: MWC

Summary
- Airport type: Public
- Owner: Milwaukee County
- Serves: Milwaukee, Wisconsin
- Opened: August 1937
- Time zone: CST (UTC−06:00)
  - Summer (DST): CDT (UTC−05:00)
- Elevation AMSL: 745 ft (227 m)
- Website: timmermanairport.com

Maps
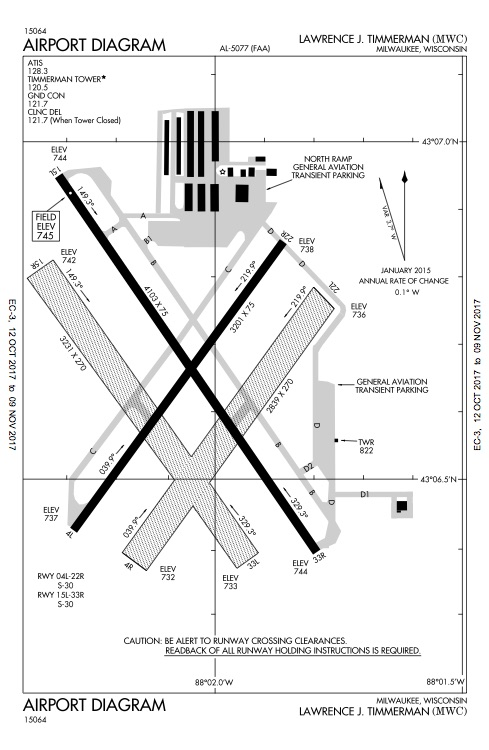
- FAA airport diagram

- Location of airport in Wisconsin MWC (the United States)

Runways
Direction	Length		Surface
Direction	ft	m	Surface
15L/33R	4,107	1,252	Asphalt
15R/33L	3,231	985	Turf
4L/22R	3,203	976	Asphalt
4R/22L	2,840	865	Turf

Statistics
- Aircraft operations (2023): 27,266
- Based aircraft (2024): 90
- Source: Federal Aviation Administration

Lawrence J. Timmerman Airport (IATA: MWC, ICAO: KMWC, FAA LID: MWC), known locally as Timmerman Field, is an airport in Milwaukee, Wisconsin, United States, owned by Milwaukee County. Located 5 miles (8 km) northwest of the city center, it is used mainly for general or private aviation. It is included in the Federal Aviation Administration (FAA) National Plan of Integrated Airport Systems for 2025–2029, in which it is categorized as a regional reliever airport facility.

== History ==
The airport was built in 1929 and dedicated on July 6, 1930, one of 25 such projects in U.S. cities by the newly incorporated airplane manufacturer Curtiss-Wright. The airport was originally known as Curtiss-Wright Field, hence the letters "WC" in its airport codes. In 1945, Curtiss-Wright sold it to Fliteways, Inc., the airport's property manager since 1936. Milwaukee County purchased the airport from Fliteways in July 1947, when it was 131 acres (53 ha) in size. It was host to the Experimental Aircraft Association's earliest Fly-In Conventions from 1953 to 1958. The airport was renamed in July 1959 for Lawrence J. Timmerman (1878–1959), chairman of the Milwaukee County Board of Supervisors from 1936 to 1959.

== Current users ==
Lawrence J. Timmerman Airport currently serves various general aviation groups. The current fixed-base operator is Spring City Aviation. The airport is home to the Milwaukee chapter of Youth and Aviation, as well as two Civil Air Patrol squadrons: the Timmerman Composite Squadron and the Milwaukee Senior Support Squadron 10. The airport also serves many private and public users.

== Facilities and aircraft ==
Lawrence J. Timmerman Airport covers an area of 420 acres (170 ha) and contains two asphalt paved runways: the primary runway 15L/33R measuring 4,107 x 75 ft (1,252 x 23 m) and the crosswind runway 4L/22R measuring 3,203 x 75 ft (976 x 23 m). It also has two turf runways: 15R/33L measuring 3,231 x 270 ft (985 x 82 m) and 4R/22L measuring 2,840 x 270 ft (865 x 82 m).

For the 12-month period ending April 30, 2023, the airport had 27,266 aircraft operations, an average of 75 per day: 97% general aviation, 2% military, and just less than 1% air taxi. In August 2024, there were 90 aircraft based at this airport: 78 single-engine, 8 multi-engine, 3 jets and 1 helicopter.

== Ground transportation ==
Public transit service to the airport is provided by Milwaukee County Transit System via routes 11, 57, 58, 63, and 92.

== Accidents & Incidents ==
- On May 26, 2022, a Cessna 152 crashed while on a training flight at Timmerman. The student pilot in control of the plane was doing solo landing practice when he reported engine trouble and flight control issues and subsequently crashed in a yard near the airport. The pilot received fatal injuries.

== See also ==
- List of airports in Wisconsin
