= Zimmerman Island =

Island in Wilkes Land, Antarctica

- Location of island in Antarctica
- Interactive map of Zimmerman Island
- Etymology: John R. Zimmerman

Geography
- Location: Windmill Islands
- Coordinates: 66°26′S 110°27′E
- Adjacent to: Indian Ocean
- Highest elevation: 41 m (135 ft)

Administration
- Antarctica
- Region: Australian Antarctic Territory

Zimmerman Island is a mainly ice-free island 0.4 miles (0.6 km) southeast of Werlein Island in the Windmill Islands. First mapped from air photos taken by U.S. Navy Operation Highjump and Operation Windmill in 1947 and 1948. Named by the Advisory Committee on Antarctic Names (US-ACAN) for John R. Zimmerman, meteorologist and member of the Wilkes Station party of 1958.

== See also ==
- List of antarctic and sub-antarctic islands
