= Timmermann =

Timmermann is a German occupational surname with the meaning "carpenter". Notable people with the surname include:

- Achim Timmermann, Professor and university program director
- Astrid Timmermann-Fechter, German politician
- Axel Timmermann, German climate physicist and oceanographer
- Bernardo Timmermann, Chilean politician
- Bonnie Timmermann, American film producer
- Hans Timmermann (1926–2005), German television actor
- Henri Timmermann, Belgian cyclist
- Jens Timmermann (born 1970), German philosopher
- Karl H. Timmermann (1922–1951), United States Army officer
- Tom Timmermann (born 1940), American baseball player
- Ulf Timmermann, East German shot putter
- Wibke Kristin Timmermann, German scholar
