= Benjamin Zimmerman =

Canadian businessman

Benjamin Zimmerman (July 23, 1862 – September 12, 1923) was a Jewish-Canadian businessman, community leader, and justice of the peace. He was one of the founders of the Hebrew Benevolent Society, one of the earliest Jewish charitable organizations in Winnipeg.

== Biography ==
He and his family were part of the Jewish immigration from Russia during the early 1880s. Victims of the pogroms and of social, economic, and political persecution, the Zimmermans were among hundreds who arrived in Winnipeg, Manitoba, Canada, in 1882. The father, Nathan Zimmerman and Benjamin both found work as labourers with the Canadian Pacific Railway. When some capital had been saved, Nathan became a pedlar and, by 1884, had established a small clothing and dry-goods store with Benjamin assisting him. Three years later, his father established a pawnbroking business with another relative.

Benjamin Zimmerman had also started a peddling company by 1890 and became a jobber specializing in clothing. By the turn of the century, he also had a pawnbroking business and was well known as a reputable lender. He and his family branched into other profitable areas of business and he became a leader of the growing Jewish community in Winnipeg. His prominence in the Jewish community allowed him to exert a great deal of influence on the politics of the time. He was appointed a JP during the provincial government of Thomas Greenway.

He was a founder of Jewish charitable organizations within the community and a strong influence on the religious community with many positions within various synagogue congregations. He was also a JP in Winnipeg for almost 25 years and his judicial work was highly regarded. Most importantly, he was a hard-working first generation eastern European Jewish immigrant who became financially successful and integrated into the larger society and, as such stands as a representative of those people.
