= Nathan Löb David Zimmer =

Bavarian businessman and Rabbi

Personal life
- Born: 28 January 1830 Fürth, Bavaria, German Confederation
- Died: 10 June 1895 (aged 65) London, United Kingdom

Religious life
- Religion: Judaism

Nathan Löb David Zimmer (28 January 1830, Fürth – 10 June 1895, London) was a Bavarian-born English businessman, scholar, and Kabbalist.

Born in Bavaria into a pious Jewish family, Zimmer immigrated to England in about 1850 and entered business as an importer of toys and fancy goods. He was primarily engrossed with the study of Halakha, however, and especially with the more esoteric commentaries. His knowledge of the Kabbalah, and especially of gematria, was profound, and astronomical calculations also had a strong attraction for him.

Zimmer compiled an elaborate genealogical table of the Chief Rabbis of the United Kingdom, and was a frequent contributor to the Jewish periodical press on questions of astronomical calculation and of ritual. He was one of the original founders of the Federation of Synagogues.

The character of Froom Karlkammer in Israel Zangwill's Children of the Ghetto is said to have been based on Zimmer.
