= Don Zimmerman =

Don Zimmerman may refer to:

== Sports ==
- Don Zimmerman (wide receiver) (1949–2020), American professional wide receiver in the National Football League
- Don Zimmerman (halfback) (1913–1974), All-American college football player for Tulane University
- Don Zimmerman (lacrosse) (born 1953), American lacrosse coach

== Other people ==
- Don Zimmerman (film editor) (1944–2025), American film editor
- Don Z. Zimmerman (1903–1983), US Air Force general

== See also ==
- Don Zimmer (1931–2014), American baseball player and manager
- Donald Zimmerman (born 1931), Kansas state legislator
