= Justice Zimmerman =

Justice Zimmerman may refer to:

- Michael David Zimmerman (born 1943), chief justice of the Utah Supreme Court
- Charles B. Zimmerman (1891–1969), associate justice of the Ohio Supreme Court
