= Disappearance of Pascal Zimmer =

2001 disappearance of a 5-year-old boy in Saarbrücken, Germany

Pascal Zimmer
- Born: 11 December 1995; Saarbrücken, Saarland, Germany
- Disappeared: 30 September 2001 (aged 5); Saarbrücken, Saarland, Germany
- Status: Missing for 24 years, 11 months and 12 days

On 30 September 2001, 5-year-old Pascal Zimmer disappeared in the Burbach quarter of Saarbrücken, Saarland, Germany. The investigation was plagued by dead-end leads, as well as allegations of misconduct, evidence tampering, and incompetence against police. The subsequent trial, dubbed the Pascal Trial (German: Pascal-Prozess), and later acquittal of twelve defendants accused of Pascal's rape and murder between 2004 and 2007 is regarded as the longest and most complex criminal case in the state's judicial history. The case remains unsolved.

== Background ==
Pascal Zimmer was the only child of Sonja Zimmer, a homekeeper who was unemployed due to obesity and chronic illness. His stepfather was Karl-Heinz Coen, a manual labourer with a criminal record and alcohol problems. Through Coen, Pascal had two stepsisters. He grew up in Burbach, an industrial area of Saarbrücken, considered a deprived area with high rates of unemployment, prostitution, drug abuse, and violent crime. Pascal had health issues, and was underweight due to a metabolic disorder.

== Disappearance ==
Pascal left his home on Hochstraße shortly before 16:00, riding his yellow-blue bicycle to the annual Oktoberkirmes, a local Oktoberfest celebration held at the Festplatz, with a curfew to return by 18:30. Police described Pascal as 120 cm in height and weighing 18 kilograms, with short blond hair, brown eyes, and a noticeable gap between his incisors. He was last seen wearing a light blue long-sleeved sweater, blue sweatpants, and black-blue trainers.

Pascal spent a few minutes at the Oktoberkirmes, where an employee gifted him a balloon. He then exited the festival grounds through a less lively side-exit at around 17:00. His bicycle helmet was found in the courtyard of an apartment building an hour later. Pascal's aunt was alerted by the boy's mother shortly after 20:00, taking a photo from the home and spending a few hours searching the Oktoberkirmes for her nephew without success. The aunt and Pascal's stepfather reported the boy missing shortly before 21:00.

A special commission was formed, but despite receiving hundreds of tips from the public over the course of nearly a year, the boy remained missing. Both Saarland Police and the French gendarmerie of neighbouring Moselle participated in a search of both residential and wooded areas surrounding Saarbrücken. Over the following weeks, Pascal's mother was treated at a hospital for shock while Pascal's stepfather made several pleas on television tearfully asking for his son to be found, with relatives offering a €20,000 reward for information that would lead to his return. Unknown to Pascal's parents, there were a few Internet donation sites within days of their son's disappearance, claiming to be affiliated with the family.

== Investigation ==
Within two weeks, Pascal's stepsisters were implicated. 18-year-old Melanie became a suspect, after her 14-year-old sister Sarah claimed that the older girl had confessed to following Pascal to the Oktoberkirmes and beating him to death with a shovel or iron bar. Sarah recanted the accusation after eight days and gave two differing explanations, the first being that police officers had beaten her so that she would instead push a different narrative, according to which a stranger had taken Pascal into his car. After an investigation into assault and testimony manipulation was dropped against the officers, Sarah instead claimed that Melanie had asked her sister to not implicate her. By the time she testified in court in 2004, she stated that officers had pressured her into the confession via coercion, but not physical violence, and invented the entire story by herself on the spot.

Around the same time as Pascal Zimmer disappeared, pediatric nurse Esther Fehrer took in a 6-year-old boy (born 7 January 1995) from Saarbrücken-Burbach. The boy, most often referred to by the pseudonyms "Kevin", "Tobias", and "Bernie", had been removed from the custody of his mentally disabled mother, Andrea Müller, who herself was under legal guardianship of Christa Weyand, the sister of Müller's latest boyfriend. Weyand was a former lay judge for the Jugendschöffengericht (juvenile court for adolescent offenders) and ran a local dive bar, the "Tosa-Klause", out of a small hut building near Burbach's railway station, located only a few blocks from Pascal Zimmer's home. It was through Weyand's brother that Jugendamt were convinced to remove "Kevin" from his mother in January 2001, as Christa Weyand forced the boy to eat expired food, sleep in an unheated room, and act as a drug courier for her. The accusation came after Weyand had refused to pay her brother 100,000 DM after she received the entire inheritance from their father.

While "Kevin" had been adjusting well to his newest foster family, his foster mother noted that he displayed sexual behaviours, also being prone to experiencing flashbacks and periods of extreme fear, during which "Kevin" would hyperventilate and sometimes choke himself. "Kevin" reluctantly opened up to his past over time and in autumn 2002, "Kevin" told his foster mother of abuse he experienced through his biological mother. Between 1999 and 2001, "Kevin" had been raped in at least four instances by associates of Christa Weyand, with his mother aiding in one of the rapes in Forbach, France.

After the foster mother called police, they confirmed that "Tosa-Klause" had been under long observation due to suspected child sexual abuse. On 19 November 2003, the bar's owner, and around two dozen patrons, codenamed "Tosa-Gemeinschaft" ("Tosa-Community"), were arrested in a raid. While in custody, a few of the accused made mention of the name "Pascal". Pascal Zimmer had previously been taken to the bar by his stepfather until the latter stopped going due to unpaid tabs. The first to make a confession was Peter Sch., a regular patron of the "Tosa-Klause", who admitted in January 2003 to the rape of both Kevin and Pascal, claiming that the bar owner had prostituted the boys to customers for a 20 DM fee. On 14 February 2003, Gabriele G., at the time not under suspicion, was questioned to confirm a suspect's alibi. During her statement, she told officers that the missing Pascal Zimmer had been murdered in the Tosa-Klause. However, she later claimed to have "just imagined the whole thing".

A week after G.'s confession, Kevin's mother Andrea Müller, who prostituted herself out of the "Tosa Klause", stated that Pascal had been abducted, repeatedly raped by three to five men and smothered to death with a pillow in one day. Müller stated that Pascal's death was accidental and that she had been the one to kill him as Pascal was being raped by in an attempt to silence his screams from attracting attention. Afterwards, she alleged that his body was put in a garbage bag and smuggled over the French–German border to be dumped in a sandpit in a border town, either Forbach or Schœneck. Müller also implicated Dieter S. in the rape of her son at his apartment in 1999. According to Siggi D., who denied taking part in the abuse himself, "Kevin" was raped at the Tosa-Klause twice a week. Christa Weyand reportedly listed each rape with a line or cross drawn on a beermat, the same system used to charge for drinks.

However, the various testimonies often contradicted each other and a search of both Schœneck and Forbach did not find a corpse. Similarly, a forensic analysis of the "Tosa-Klause" did not find any signs of a rape or murder taking place, nor was any of Pascal's DNA recovered. As the investigation progressed, it became clear that a number of the accused were severely mentally disabled and chronic alcoholics, calling the admissibility of their claims into question.

Between 2001 and 2004, several sighting of Pascal were still reported, including at the Saarbrücken Hauptbahnhof, in various French cities such as Sarreguemines, Nice, and Paris, or "in the clutches of a child sex ring" in Amsterdam.

== Trial ==
In October 2003, Peter Sch. (48) was tried and found guilty of child molestation after just two days trial. Sch. was judged to be severely mentally disabled and although he had a previous conviction for a sex offense involving children, he was sentenced to seven years imprisonment followed by a lifelong stay at a psychiatric facility. A court doctor had attested an IQ of 60, alcoholism, and pedophilia to Peter Sch. to show he held diminished responsibility. The trial was criticised for its overly quick process.

In September 2004, thirteen of the initial suspects, four women and nine men, were indicted and charged with the rape and murder of Pascal Zimmer. Christa Weyand (51) was the main defendant as she was considered the leading figure in the suspected child abuse ring. The prosecution had accused six of the defendants, Weyand, Günter Ludwig (50), Hans-Josef "Jupp" W. (49), Michael C. (47), Dieter S. (61) and Martin R. (42), of murder and rape of Pascal, and child molestation of Kevin and a 10-year-old girl (born 1991; "Sandra" or "Sabrina") while the other five, Sigmund "Siggi" D. (44), Erika K. (51), Gabriele G. (50), Horst K. (49), Kurt K. (45) and Detlef S. (37), were charged with being accessories to murder for luring the victim and helping dispose of his remains. By 2007, convictions would have resulted in the former receiving life imprisonment (with preventative detention for four of them) and the latter receiving sentences between 4½ and 9½ years. The defense and prosecution had agreed on 14 years and 9 months with subsequent involuntary confinement for Andrea Müller (40), who claimed to have been the one to kill Pascal and was serving as a main witness in the trial.

=== Main accused ===
Christa Weyand invoked her right to remain silent throughout the trial, barring a single instance regarding her personal history in July 2005. Unlike the rest of defendants, Weyand was described as exceptionally intelligent with an IQ of 138, though also noted as having only graduated Hauptschule. After completing training as a stenotyper, Weyand was employed at a boutique, a Commerzbank, and the Diakonie Deutschland, as well as a night-shift taxi driver. In 1990, she started work as a pub manager, successively operating three bars, the Tosa-Klause being the third and final one. She lived in Riegelsberg with fellow defendants Andrea Müller and Michael C., as well as three other men, aged 36 to 50, serving as their almoner by providing abode and food in exchange for their welfare payments. Weyand also acted as an informant to some members of Saarbrücken Police, telling them about the sale of stolen goods she observed at her bar. She was simultaneously under secret observation by the Saarland LKA after Weyand's brother accused her of smuggling hashish, with the phone lines of both her home and the Tosa-Klause tapped by investigators.

Andrea Müller was the star witness of the trial, but regularly contradicted or changed the content of her testimony. Müller was determined to have an IQ bordering at feeble-mindedness (below 70) by former standards. Müller had spent her childhood with her grandmother, as her mother was a prostitute who relied on social benefits. At age 12, Müller's grandmother was diagnosed with cancer, she was given into the care of a foster family in North Rhine-Westphalia. She ran away shortly after, engaging in child prostitution in Hamburg and Bremen before being returned to the foster family. She again escaped custody, making it back to Saarland to move in with her mother. The two lived together until March 1984, when Müller's mother was murdered by Müller's then-boyfriend. Müller was put under social care in June 1984 and spent the next seven years in women's shelters, social psychiatric facilities and sheltered workshops, with intermittent periods of homelessness and prostitution. She had four children during this time, putting all of them up for adoption.

In the early 1990s, Andrea Müller entered a relationship with Christa Weyand's brother, who allowed her to move in with him in exchange for sex. Once this arrangement ceased, Weyand's brother left Müller with his sister, who became Müller's official caretaker in September 1993. Weyand instructed Müller to collect welfare from government offices and would also act as her pimp. The latter operation was initially undertaken at their shared home before being moved to a back room in Weyand's first bar, taking payment by Müller's clients directly. Every month, Weyand also took 500 DM for rent and 400 DM in household contribution. When Müller fell pregnant with "Kevin", Weyand convinced Müller to not put the child up for adoption, with Weyand taking legal guardianship of the boy and receiving half of the resultant 600 DM Erziehungsgeld. Müller maintained that she disagreed with the sexual exploitation of "Kevin" by Weyand, but also insisted that he was not otherwise abused by Weyand, who characterised the accusation from her brother as a smear attempt due to their inheritance feud. The Saarbrücken social office had records of alleged abuse against "Kevin" dating back to 31 October 1995, when "Kevin" was ten months old, sourced from neighbours, with Weyand already facing charges by the office since January 2001.

=== Reconstruction ===
According to the testimonies, most of the defendants only knew each other by nicknames (Luddi, Jupp, Kurti, Siggi, Gabi, etc.). Christa Weyand allegedly offered the sexual exploitation of children since at least 1999, when she first opened the Tosa-Klause. Before "Kevin", she allegedly facilitated the rape of several different children, most under the foster care of customers or their acquaintances. "Kevin" had met Pascal a while earlier and sometimes played with him, which Pascal's mother wasn't aware of. Though Peter Sch. claimed to have raped Pascal before 30 September 2001, it was later assumed that he mixed up the names and couldn't tell if there were different victims. Friends of Sch. also stated that he was with them at the time Pascal was killed. Pascal's mother also attested that she often helped her son bath and did not see any wounds on him.

On the day of Pascal's disappearance, the bar was opened up at 10:00 by Dieter S. Christa Weyand, Andrea Müller and Günter Ludwig arrived at the bar at midday. Pascal had allegedly been lured to the Tosa-Klause with the offer of candy by Weyand. Siggi D. was alleged to have lured Pascal to the bar as well as several previous times. Müller later recalled that besides her, there were at least eleven people in the bar. Andrea Müller then dragged the boy inside and forced him into a maintenance closet, measuring 5 square metres (54 sq ft). Andrea Müller stated that four men successively raped Pascal: Dieter S., Michael C., a man whose identity she could not recall and finally Martin R. Siggi D. said that he saw four regular customers, Peter S., Jupp W.. Dieter S., and Martin R., enter the back room, after which he heard loud moaning. Horst K. said he saw Michael C. follow Müller into the closet and leave 20 minutes later, after which Jupp W. also entered and left. Martin R. was the last inside, after which Horst K. heard screaming. Both agreed that Christa Weyand turned the music up to drown out the sound. Erika K., a cleaner at the Tosa-Klause and certified as developmentally disabled by psychiatrists, claimed to have peeked through the door and witnessed Martin R. raping Pascal.

Inside the closet, Pascal was raped on a bed, aided by Müller who held the boy down and also sexually assaulted him. Christa Weyand stood in the doorframe and either made photos or filmed a video. While being raped by Martin R., Pascal's increasingly loud screams caused Weyand and R. to tell Andrea Müller to "quiet the little guy down" ("den Kleinen ruhig stellen"). Müller grabbed Pascal by his shoulders as he was in a prone position and pushed him onto the pillow. Eventually, she realised that Pascal was no longer breathing and informed Weyand of this, who shouted "That wasn't supposed to happen!" and told those present, including eight patrons outside the backroom, to help dispose of Pascal. Michael C. wrapped Pascal's body in a blanket and handed a blue garbage bag to Andrea Müller and Erika K., who held the bag open while either Michael C. or Dieter S. stuffed Pascal's body inside. Martin R. and Müller then received drinks from cashier Gabriele G., with Müller consuming three or four cola cognac drinks. R. continued drinking while Müller then carried the garbag bag to Weyand's Renault 4, and together with Weyand and Dieter S., they drove into France to a quarry near the border, where Dieter S. dug a hole and buried the remains. Upon their return, Erika K. took their clothes and cleaned the back room. This alleged series of events was recreated by those involved in a filmed police re-enactment.

Later, Erika K. claimed to have seen a video in which Pascal, "Kevin", and a dark-skinned girl, whom K. identified as her goddaughter, were raped by two or three of the men, one of whom she identified as Martin R.. She described the children as "wriggling" and "like they were resisting", with Pascal "screaming miserably". No physical video was found nor could she recall closer details, though she claimed to have discussed the contents with the foster mother of the girl, who was a witness during the trial. Andrea Müller also claimed there was a video and that Christa Weyand intended to sell it, but she recanted, with the court noting that this statement was made several months after first questioning.

One of the alleged rapists, Jupp W., was confirmed to have played during an informal football match in Forbach at the time of the incident. Detlef S. argued that he was not inside the Tosa-Klause during the murder. Tanja K., the only other witness claimed to have seen the blue garbage bag at the bar, recanted to her lawyer, stating that police had threatened to take away her children.

=== Developments and deaths ===
In April 2004, defendant Erika K. rented the former home of Pascal Zimmer, after his parents had moved out. It was noted that K. situated her sleeping quarters in Pascal's former bedroom and made no efforts to remove any leftover posters.

In November 2004, Martin R. was temporarily deemed unfit for trial after a suicide attempt in which he cut his wrists. R., Detlef S. and Kurt K. were subsequently released from jail custody, citing insufficient suspicion of offence. In October 2005, Jupp W. was deemed unfit for trial after a hunger strike, as was Günter Ludwig after suffering a seizure.

In summer 2005, both of Pascal's parents, his biological mother and stepfather, who were plaintiffs in the case, died of natural causes. 46-year-old Sonja Zimmer died on 14 June from an intercerebral hemorrhage while 50-year-old Heinz Coen died on 2 July of a heart attack following hospitalisation after a bar fight.

In October 2005, Erika K., Gabriele G., Horst K. and Günter Ludwig were released from jail custody, also for lack of probable cause. Ludwig died during stationary treatment at a jail hospice a few months later, aged 51. By June 2006, none of the defendants remained in jail custody. The defendants again testified and repeated their statements admitting to either raping Pascal or aiding in hiding, transporting and burying the boy's body. Based on these testimonies, police resumed their search for Pascal's body in 2006, but some defendants would rescind their statements, alleging that they had been coerced and physically abused by police into providing false admissions during initial interrogation. Several of them revoked these recantations, only to repeat the process several times over throughout the course of the trial. There were increasing doubts about the legitimacy of both the claims of Pascal's murder in the Tosa-Klause and the child sexual abuse against "Kevin", with suggestions that he was recalling false memories of being raped and knowing Pascal through subtle suggestions by his foster mother and later police. The foster mother, Esther Fehrer, subsequently handed in several handdrawn pictures by "Kevin", which depicted his apparent recollection of abuse while with his mother.

On 7 September 2007, all defendants were acquitted, largely due to a lack of physical evidence, as well as due to the main witness, defendant Andrea Müller, recanting her testimony. The judges reasoned that the court could "prove neither guilt or innocence", with primary judge Ulrich Chudoba stating "The suspicion remains, but no one may be convicted on suspicion alone". On a separate narcotics charge, Christa Weyand was given a one-year prison sentence for smuggling drugs into prison for her son. The trial had consisted of 147 individual court dates and heard 294 instances of witness testimony. The prosecution filed for revision, but the appeal was denied by the Federal Court of Justice in 2009. The decision was again affirmed in 2013. The children's welfare organisation Deutsche Kinderhilfe referred to the ruling as "a dark day for child victims in the German judicial system".

== Aftermath ==
The Pascal Trial was compared in infamy and complexity to two earlier major child sexual abuse trials, the Montessori Trial (1992–1995) and the Worms Trials (1994–1997). In both cases, it was found that the children gave testimonies consisting of false memories and confabulation due to psychologists heavily using suggestion and based their judgements on obsolete or unrecognised techniques. In the latter case, where 26 people were falsely accused of producing child pornography, a larger scandal erupted when it was revealed that some of the children ended up being actually molested at the Evangelical Spatzennest home, where they were kept by court order after separation from their parents, which was maintained after their exoneration citing parental alienation. While these two cases also lacked physical evidence, the Pascal Trial differed through the admissions of some of the defendants. Even then, considering the outcomes of the Montessori and Worms trials, most of the press had predicted acquittals since the beginning of court proceedings.

In 2008, it was revealed that police had received information about potential child sexual abuse at Tosa-Klause earlier than initially stated, in February 2001, during an investigation into drug trading at the bar. The report compiled by an informant had been left unprocessed by the officer in charge and was later destroyed. An investigation was handled internally without public knowledge in 2003 and ceased without punitive measures.

Between 2006 and 2016, acquitted defendant Martin R. committed a number of other serious crimes. In 2007, he was tried, but acquitted of trespassing, theft, and assault. On 29 May 2009, Martin R. fatally stabbed a neighbour, who had tried to quell a drunken argument over an alleged theft between R. and another resident. He was sentenced to seven years imprisonment on a manslaughter conviction in July 2009. In 2016, a year after his release, Martin R. was tried for aggravated sexual assault, physical assault, and theft for groping, beating and robbing an 88-year-old neighbour. He was convicted only of assault and received two years and nine months imprisonment. Additionally, another former defendant, French national Dieter S., was under investigation for child molestation when he died of natural causes in 2010.

In 2011, it was revealed that Andrea Müller had told fellow inmates in remand before the trial that Pascal had been dug up from his original burial site and since been hidden in Luxembourg, on a property belonging to a friend of Christa Weyand. According to Müller, Pascal's body was reburied because Müller had compromised the original location by telling one of her boyfriends of the murder. The witness to this confession, Margarete L., who was imprisoned at the same correctional facility on drug charges, stated that Müller had freely told her of both the details of the crime and the burial. L. contacted the press only recently after she read the book Pascal – Anatomie eines ungeklärten Falles without seeing any reference to the Luxembourg lead, which was found to have been kept in police records as "Spur 677" ("Lead 677"). Saarland Kripo contacted Luxembourgish authorities to inquire if any of the former defendants had real estate in the country, but they denied to give information unless a court order was provided. Although police filed for such an order the Saarland's state court chose to not pursue the claim. In regards to the lead, an unidentified court official stated that it would have been "not logical" to look for Pascal's remains in Luxembourg since Müller's court confession only made mention of the burial in Schœneck.

The Tosa-Klause was shut down after the arrest of Christa Weyand. After forensic analysis was deemed completed in 2003, two pizzerias successively rented the space, with the building remaining empty in-between for seven months. The latter business shut down after operating from April to July 2004, due to facing difficulties due to the stigma surrounding its potential location as a rape and murder site. By 2010, the building was used as a storage room, with most of its original interior unchanged. The hut was demolished in 2012 and a parking lot was constructed in its place.

=== Memorial ===
In June 2017, the Initiative gegen Gewalt und sexuellen Missbrauch an Kindern und Jugendlichen e. V. ("Initiative Against Violence and Sexual Abuse of Children and Youths") commissioned a memorial stone in honour of Pascal Zimmer at a cemetery of the Catholic parish of Schwalbach, as a "monument in memory of all missing and abused children". The initiative, working with Pascal's aunt Sigrid Hübner and "Kevin", had attempted to erect the memorial in Saarbrücken for several years, but the city denied the request due to "legal and content-related reasons" because administrators disagreed with the "personal nature" of the memorial. The stone features a carved epitaph, in the form of a letter addressed to Pascal, authored by "B.M." in 2010.

Missing since 30.09.2001

Dear Pascal,

we were both still so little, when we had to live through the worst thing, the abuse of children. Now I live with these painful memories I can't let go of and you are no longer here.
I'll keep you in my heart.

— B.M.

In July of the same year, "Kevin" publicly identified himself by his real name, Bernhard Müller. At the memorial service, he stated that he saw the placement of the stone as the point in his life to "come out of hiding" and "leave his victim role". He had become a beekeeper and had plans to become an ornamental horticulturist. He continued to hold occasional interviews as late as 2023.

=== 2021 incident ===
On 12 November 2021, 60-year-old Nikolaus L. was killed in Nalbach by two acquaintances, who alleged that the victim admitted to his brother's guilt in the killing during a drunken stupor. One of the murderers, 41-year-old Pascal G. from Wadern, turned himself in to police. His partner-in-crime, 50-year-old Iris B. from Völklingen, was arrested a few days later, after she assaulted a police officer and performed a Nazi salute. According to them, they had attacked Nikolaus L. in a rage when he refused to give them the name of his brother. The pair stabbed L. in the throat with a bottle opener and asphyxiated him by manual strangulation, sitting on his chest, and smothering with a pillow. Nikolaus L. had been dismembered four days after his death, with his head, arms, and legs being found in a forest near Nalbach while his torso was recovered from the pair's shared flat. In August 2022, they were convicted of manslaughter, with Pascal G. receiving 7½ years and Iris B. 10½. According to police, contrary to media claims, Nikolaus L.'s brother, who died in 2015, was not an actual defendant of the Pascal Trial. L. had implicated his brother in Pascal Zimmer's killing in 2003 to investigators in the case, but retracted this statement shortly after, admitting that he falsely accused his brother to "take revenge".

== See also ==
- Disappearance of Madeleine McCann
- List of people who disappeared mysteriously (2000–present)
