= Simmerman =

Simmerman derives from the German last name Zimmerman which means carpenter, and may refer to:

- Jack Simmerman, a top scorer in the 1934-35 St. Louis Soccer League
- Jim Simmerman (1952–2006), an American poet and editor
