= Schreiner =

Schreiner is a family name of German origin.

Schreiner is an occupational surname and refers to a joiner. Some English spelling variations of the name are Schriner, Shreiner, and Shriner.

== Notable people ==
=== Schreiner ===
- Albert Schreiner, German communist and revolutionary
- Alexander Schreiner, organist for the Mormon Tabernacle Choir
- Armin Schreiner, influential Croatian industrialist, banker and Jewish activist killed during the Holocaust
- Bernard Schreiner, French politician
- Dave Schreiner, American athlete
- David Schreiner, American politician
- Felix Schreiner (born 1986), German politician
- Jenny Schreiner (born 1956), South African activist
- Josef Schreiner, German athlete
- Jumbo Schreiner (born 1967), German actor
- Knut Schreiner, aka Euroboy, Norwegian musician
- Kristian Schreiner, Norwegian physical anthropologist
- Mike Schreiner (born 1969), Canadian politician
- Olive Schreiner, South African author
- Oliver Schreiner, South Africa judge of the Appellate Division of the Supreme Court of South Africa
- Ottmar Schreiner, German politician
- Theophilus Lyndall Schreiner (1844-1920), South African educator, legislator, and temperance leader
- William Philip Schreiner (1857–1919), South African politician

=== Schriner ===
- Joe Schriner (born 1955), American political candidate
- Sweeney Schriner (1911-1990), Canadian hockey player and Hall of Famer

=== Shreiner ===
- Tom Shreiner (1941–2015), American football player and coach

=== Shriner ===
- Earl Kenneth Shriner, American criminal
- Herb Shriner (1918-1970), American entertainer
- Kin Shriner (born 1953), American actor
- Scott Shriner (born 1965), American musician
- Wil Shriner (born 1953), American entertainer

== Enterprises and institutions ==
- Schreiner's department store
- Schreiner Airways, based in the Netherlands
- Schreiner University, Kerrville, Texas
