= Zimerman =

- Language: Germanic

Origin
- Meaning: Carpenter, room builder

Other names
- Variant form: See the navigation box at the bottom

Zimerman is a variant spelling of the surname "Zimmermann". Notable people with the surname include:

- Krystian Zimerman (born 1956), Polish pianist
- Morris Zimerman (1911–1992), South African rugby union player

== See also ==
- Zimmer, surname, variant of Zimerman
- Zimmerman (with double "m"), surname of which Zimerman is a variant
- Zimmermann, surname and a list of people with the name
