= Otto Cimrman =

Czech ice hockey player

Otto Cimrman (1 May 1925, Chomutov – 11 June 1988) was a Czech ice hockey player who competed for Czechoslovakia in the 1956 Winter Olympics.
