= Nicolas Zimmer =

German politician

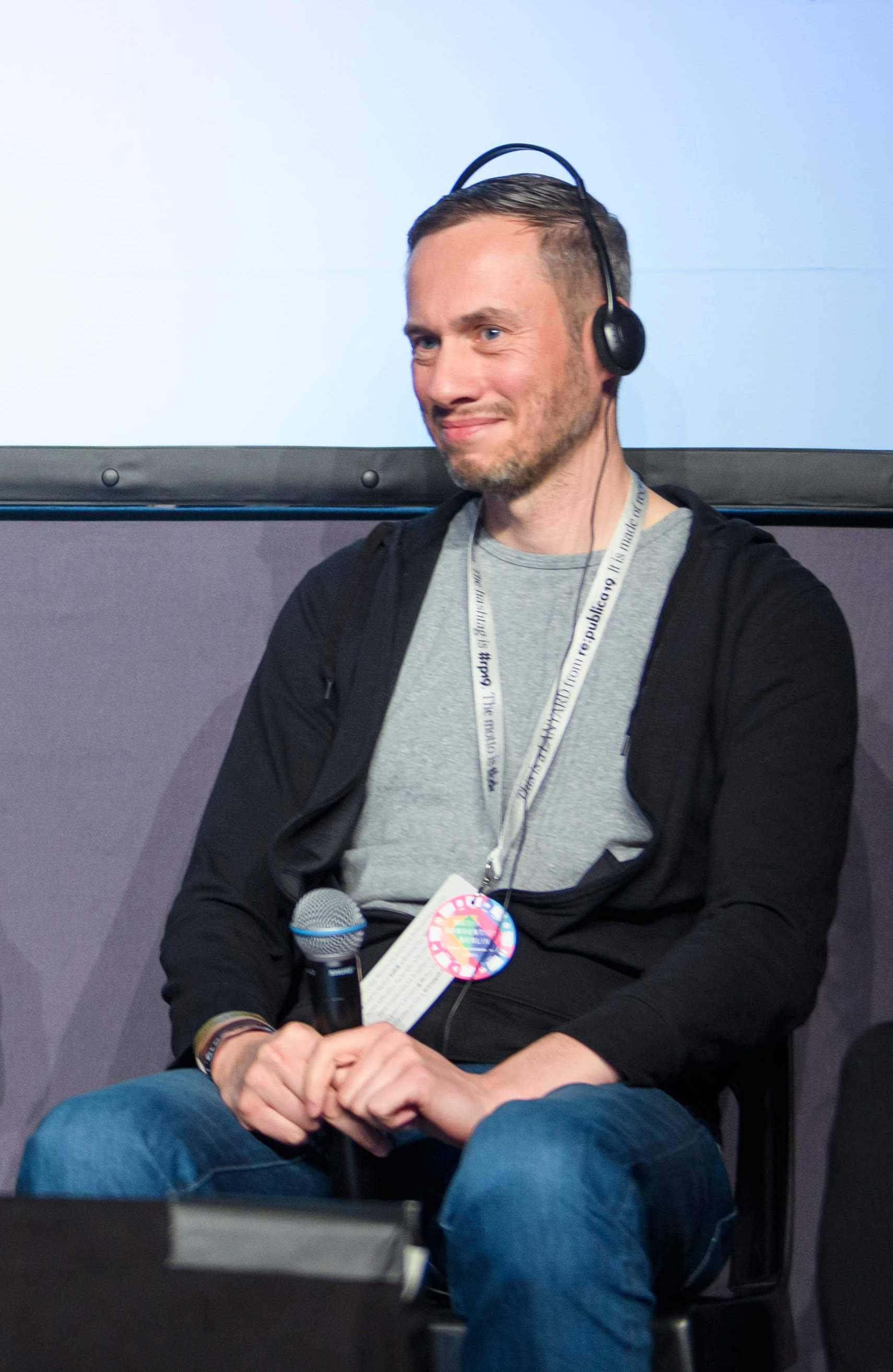
Nicolas Zimmer, 2019

Nicolas Zimmer (born 14 June 1970) is a German entrepreneur, lawyer and former CDU politician. He is the current head of the Berlin-based research institute Technologiestiftung Berlin. He was a member of the Abgeordnetenhaus of Berlin from 1998 to 2011 and concurrently the Secretary of State for the Economy, Technology and Research.

== Life ==
Zimmer studied law at the Free University of Berlin from 1989 to 1996 after passing his Abitur in 1989. From 1996 to 1997 he was the secretary of the Berlin Member for the Economy and Manufacturing, Elmar Pieroth; from 1997 to 2000 he was a legal assistant to the Kammergericht. He then changed the course of his career, studying Information technology in Hagen.

Since January 2013 he has been the director of the Technologiestiftung Berlin. Additionally, in November 2013 he founded and continued to develop his own online publishing firm.

== Politics ==
Zimmer joined the CDU in 1988 and held various important positions within the internal hierarchy of the CDU's student organisations. From 2005 to 2007 he was the head of the Tempelhof-Schöneberg section of the party.

From 1998 to 2011 he was a member of the Abgeordnetenhaus of Berlin.

On November 30, 2012, Zimmer announced that he would voluntarily resign as Secretary of State.

On December 18, 2012, he was appointed by the Board of Trustees as the new Chairman of the TSB Board of Directors.

On April 30, 2021, he resigned from the CDU as a result of the nomination of Hans-Georg Maaßen as a direct candidate in the Suhl - Schmalkalden-Meiningen - Hildburghausen - Sonneberg Bundestag constituency.
