= Alain Zimmermann =

CEO of Swiss luxury watch manufacturer Baume & Mercier (born 1967)

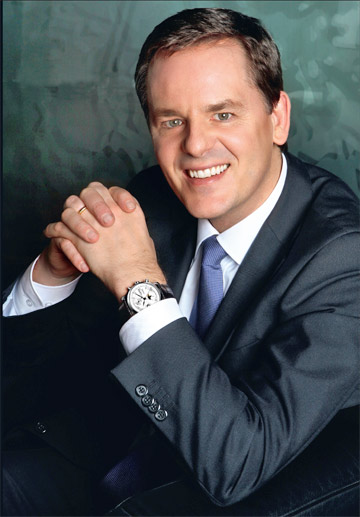
- Born: 1967 (age 58–59); Alsace, France
- Occupation: CEO of Baume et Mercier

Alain Zimmermann (born 1967) was the Chief Executive Officer of Swiss luxury watch manufacturer Baume & Mercier (belonging to the Richemont Group). His experience in the luxury industry spans over 20 years, having previously held positions in L’Oréal, Cartier and IWC.

== Early life ==
Alain Zimmermann was born in Alsace, France in 1967. He attended school in the French town of Reims where he obtained a DESEM in Marketing at the Reims Management School in 1987. He went on to study at Reutlingen University in Germany, graduating in 1989 with a degree in Business Administration specializing in Marketing & Logistics.

== Career ==
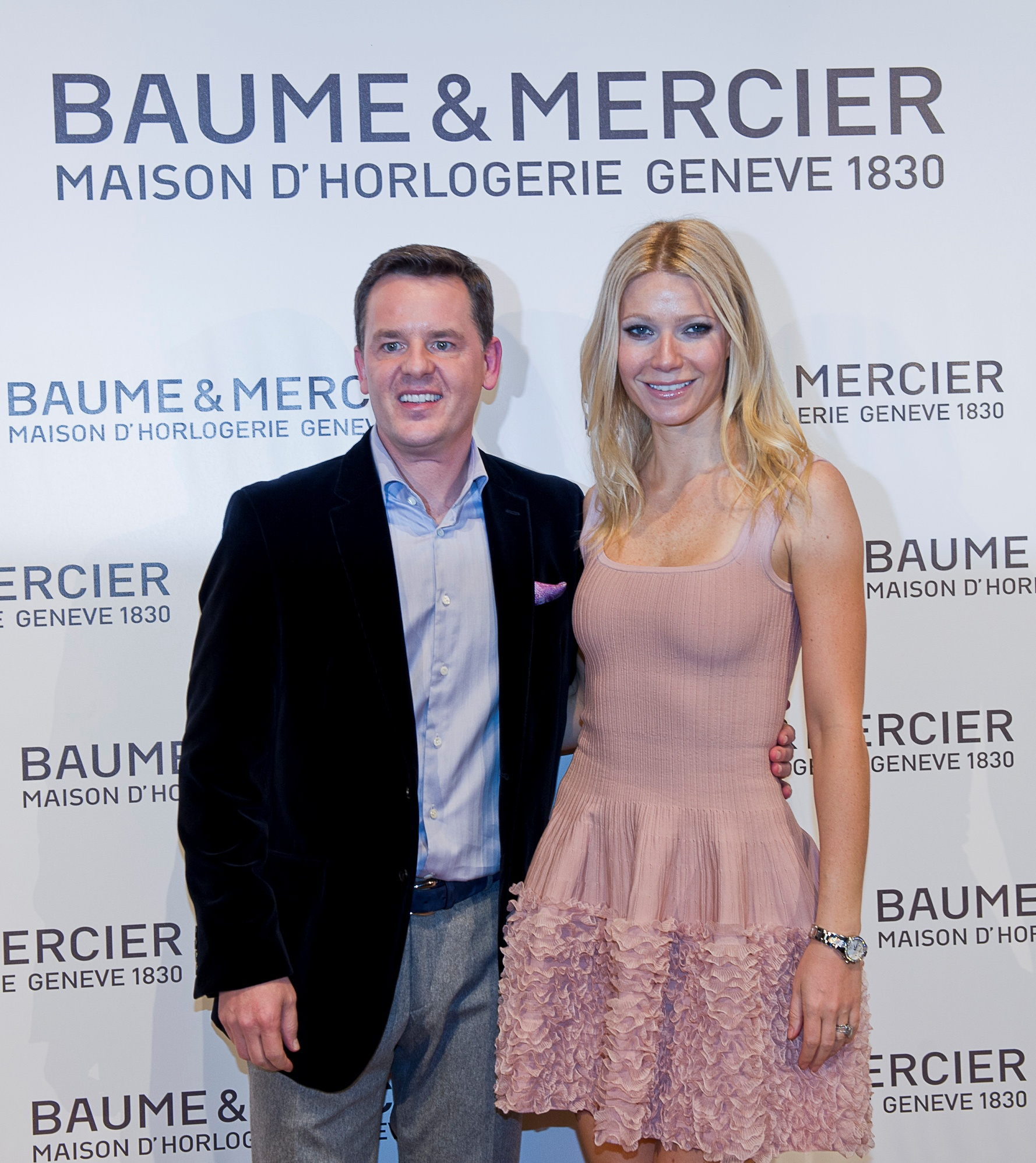
Alain Zimmermann with Baume & Mercier ambassador Gwyneth Paltrow at the 2011 Salon International de la Haute Horlogerie in Geneva, Switzerland

Zimmermann first began his career at L’Oréal Germany in 1989. Having initially signed with the company for a 16-month V.S.N.C (Voluntary National Service Company), he went on the stay with L’Oréal until 1995. At L’Oréal he encountered the world of luxury products, marketing their leading perfumes including Paloma Picasso, Armani and Ralph Lauren.

In 1995, Alain Zimmermann joined the jewelry and watch brand Cartier in Germany. Four years later he transferred from Munich to Paris, where he was appointed to International Development Director of the Cartier perfume range.

Zimmermann joined IWC, the luxury watchmakers from Schaffhausen, in 2002. In what was his first foray into haute horology, Zimmerman quickly learned about fine watchmaking through top experts. Zimmermann remained at IWC for almost five years and held a series of international sales and marketing roles.

In 2006, Zimmermann moved to Julius Baer, the private bank based in Zurich. There, he held the position of Marketing & Communications Managing Director for a period of three years, before returning to IWC as the Chief Marketing Officer.

In 2009, Alain Zimmermann assumed his current position at the Swiss-based luxury watch manufacturer Baume et Mercier as CEO. Over the next six years Zimmermann successfully implemented his primary goals of giving the meaning of the company's logo palpability and to firmly adhere to make luxury watches affordable for a much bigger clientele.

On June 1, 2018, Geoffroy Lefebvre, the then Deputy CEO of Jaeger-LeCoultre took over from Zimmermann. He became the Richemont Group's new E-distribution Strategic Project Director, a move which had been widely prepared for.

On November 19, 2020, the Digital Luxury Group announced that Alan Zimmermann would join them as Managing Partner and Board Member.

== Personal ==
Zimmermann lives with his wife and two children in Switzerland, where he pursues his passion for skiing and photography among other interests.
