= Jens Zimmermann =

Jens Zimmermann may refer to:

- Jens Zimmermann (philosopher) (born 1965), philosopher and theologian
- Jens Zimmermann (host) (born 1972), German sport announcer, moderator and athletes manager
- Jens Zimmermann (politician) (born 1981), German politician
- Jens Zimmermann (sport shooter) (born 1967), German sports shooter
