= Werlein Island =

Island in Antarctica

Werlein Island (66°25′S 110°26′E) is a rocky island 0.8 nautical miles (1.5 km) long, lying 0.2 nautical miles (0.4 km) southeast of Holl Island in the Windmill Islands. First mapped from air photos taken by U.S. Navy Operation Highjump in February 1947. Named by the Advisory Committee on Antarctic Names (US-ACAN) for Ens. Richard O. Werlein, U.S. Navy, assistant hydrographic officer with U.S. Navy Operation Windmill which established astronomical control stations in the area in January 1948.

== See also ==
- List of antarctic and sub-antarctic islands
