= Zachary Zimmer =

Canadian sociologist

Zachary Zimmer is a Canadian sociologist, currently a Canada Research Chair in Aging and Community at Mount Saint Vincent University.
