= Anton Zimmermann =

Anton Zimmermann (25 December 1741 in Široká Niva – 16 October 1781 in Bratislava) was a Silesian-born Slovak composer and contemporary of Joseph Haydn and Wolfgang Amadeus Mozart.

Zimmermann spent most of his career in Bratislava, then capital of Hungary, where he worked as a composer, violinist, conductor, and artist manager. His music has been recorded by, among others, the Musica Aeterna Soloists for the Naxos record label.
