= Roy Zimmerman (satirist) =

American singer-songwriter (born 1957)

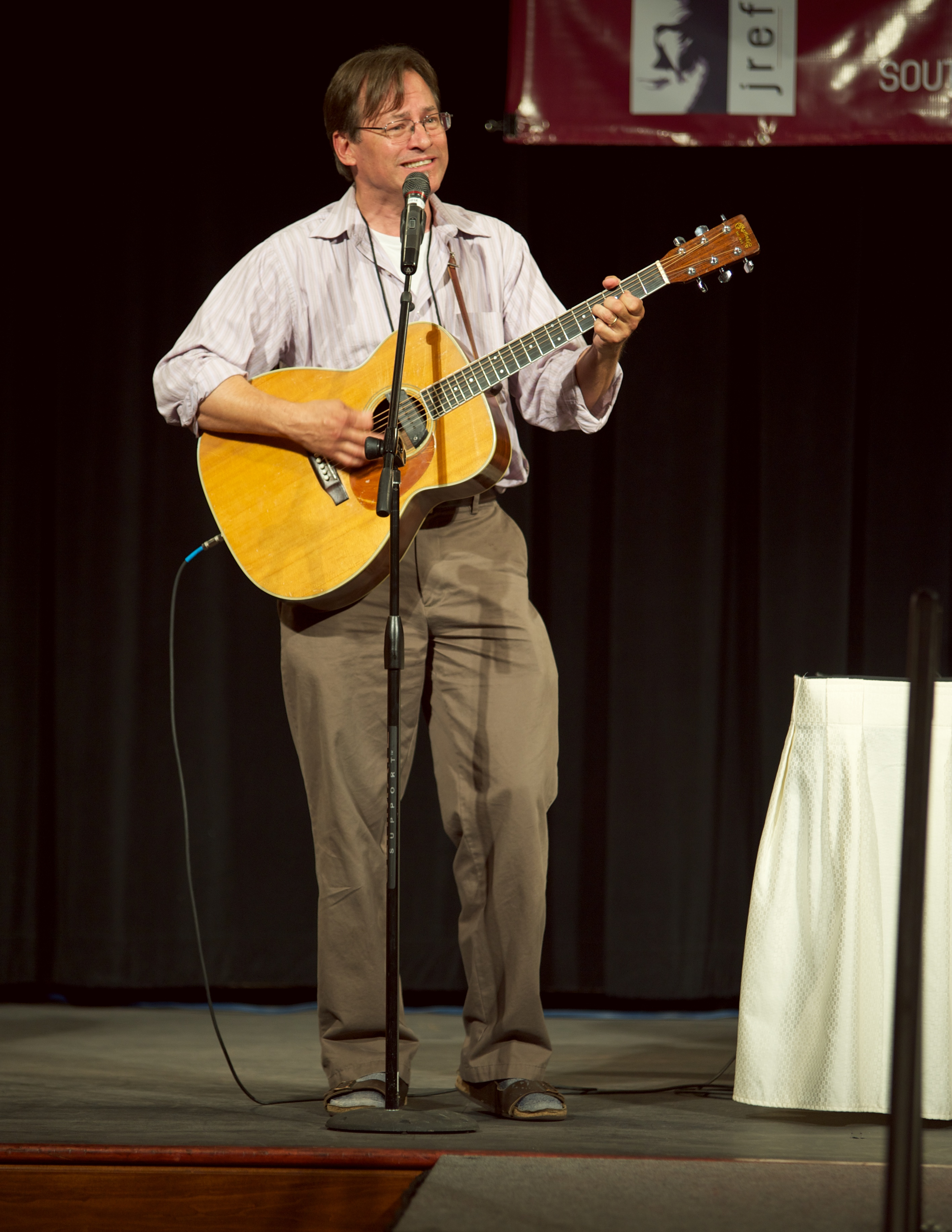
- Zimmerman performing in 2010

Background information
- Born: October 7, 1957 (age 68)
- Origin: California
- Genres: Satire
- Occupation(s): Singer-Songwriter, Satirist
- Instrument(s): Vocals, Guitar, Banjo, Harmonica
- Member of: The Foremen
- Website: royzimmerman.com

Roy Zimmerman (born October 7, 1957) is an American satirical singer-songwriter and guitarist based in Northern California.

== Biography ==
A native of Southern California, Roy Zimmerman wrote a series of satirical musical reviews in the 1980s that were produced by the San Jose Repertory Theatre, including YUP! (1984), UP the YUP (1985), and YUP It UP! (1986). The musicals parodied the excesses of the evolving yuppie culture in Silicon Valley. The songs included "Teen-age Computer Tycoon", "The Bay Area Sprawl", and "I Want to Be in a Pepsi Commercial".

Zimmerman founded the Southern California satirical folk quartet, The Foremen. It performed at the national conventions of both major American political parties in 1996. Continuing as a solo act, Zimmerman explained the philosophy behind writing and performing humorous songs on increasingly political subjects: "There's nothing funny about World Peace. Social Justice never killed at The Comedy Store. If we ever attain a worldwide consciousness of peace and justice, I'll be happily out of a job. But as long as there's poverty, war, bigotry, ignorance, greed, lust and paranoia, I've got a career".

Among the counter-events to the 2004 Republican National Convention in New York City, Zimmerman performed his song, "Chickenhawk." It indicts those who approve of militarism, as long as neither they nor anyone they know has to be directly involved.

Zimmerman played in the Rock Beyond Belief concert on March 31, 2012, at North Carolina's Fort Bragg.

His songs have been played regularly on the Dr. Demento radio show. To date he has recorded and released five versions of Solomon Linda's song "Mbube", better known in America as "The Lion Sleeps Tonight", each with a different set of satirical lyrics about Donald Trump, and several of which feature appearances by Jay Siegel of The Tokens, who made the song popular.

Roy Zimmerman lives and works in Marin County, California, with his wife and collaborator, Melanie Harby, and their sons Joe and Sam.

== Discography ==
- Comic Sutra (2004)
- Security (2004)
- Homeland (2004)
- Homeland/Security (combined double album, 2004)
- Peacenick (2005)
- Best of the Foremen (2006)
- Faulty Intelligence (2006)
- Thanks for the Support (2008)
- Real American (2010)
- You're Getting Sleepy (2011)
- The Faucet's on Fire! (2015)
- RiZe Up (2018)
