= Lawrence J. Timmerman =

American politician

Lawrence J. Timmerman (August 11, 1878 – October 5, 1959) was an American politician and lawyer.

Born in Milwaukee, Wisconsin, he worked in the United States Post Office as a Railway Postal Clerk. In 1909 he received his bachelor of laws degree from Marquette University, which had taken over Milwaukee Law School where he had been studying. He practiced law. In 1923, Timmerman served in the Wisconsin State Assembly and was a Republican. He then served on the Milwaukee County, Wisconsin Board of Supervisors from 1923 until his death in 1959 and was chairman of the board. His son was Lawrence W. Timmerman who also served in the Wisconsin Assembly and the Milwaukee County Board of Supervisors. Timmerman died in Milwaukee. The Lawrence J. Timmerman Airport is named after him.
