= Frederick Henry Zimmerman =

American politician (1883–1968)

Frederick Henry Zimmerman (May 5, 1883 – June 8, 1968) was an American farmer and politician.

Zimmerman was born on a farm in Cleveland Township, Le Sueur County, Minnesota. He lived in Le Center, Minnesota with his wife and family and was a farmer and a businessman involving the creamery business. He served on the Cordova Township Board and on the Le Sueur County School Board and was the school board clerk. Zimmerman served in the Minnesota House of Representatives from 1927 to 1930. He died in Nicollet County, Minnesota and was buried in the Cleveland Lutheran Cemetery.
