= Lawrence W. Timmerman =

American politician

Lawrence W. Timmerman (1910–2003) was a member of the Wisconsin State Assembly.

== Biography ==
Timmerman was born on June 1, 1910, in Milwaukee, Wisconsin. Timmerman received his bachelor's and master's degrees from Marquette University and his law degree from Marquette University Law School. His father was Lawrence J. Timmerman who also served in the Wisconsin Assembly. He practiced law. Timmerman died January 8, 2003, in Wauwatosa, Wisconsin.

== Political career ==
Timmerman was a member of the Assembly from 1955 to 1959. He then served on the Milwaukee County, Wisconsin Board of Supervisors from 1959 to 1980. He was a Republican.
