= List of multinational festivals and holidays =

This is an incomplete list of multinational festivals and holidays.

== January ==
Christianity

- Feast of the Circumcision: 1 January
- Twelfth Night (Epiphany Eve): 5 January
- Epiphany: 6 January – the arrival of the Three Magi
- Armenian Apostolic Christmas: 6 January
- Orthodox Christmas: 7 January – in churches using the Julian calendar. Until the year 2100, 7 January in the Julian Calendar is equivalent to 25 December in the Gregorian calendar.

Secular

- Saint Basil's Day: 1 January – In Greek traditions, he is the Father Christmas figure.
- New Year's Day: 1 January – First day of the Gregorian Year.
- Old New Year: 14 January – New Year's Day according to the "old" Julian calendar. Includes a winter ritual of strolling and singing that was later incorporated into the Christmas carol.
- Burns Supper. 25 January – Celebration of the life and poetry of Robert Burns, along with Scottish food and drink such as haggis and Scotch whisky.

Sikhism

- Lohri/Bhogi: 13 January

Telugu, Karnataka, Gujarat and Maharashtra

- Makar Sankranti: 14 January

Tamil Nadu

- Pongal: 14 January

Punjab

- Lohri: 13/14 January

Jammu

- Lohri: 13/14 January

== February ==
Tibetan Buddhism

- Losar: Sometime in February (Moveable)

Christianity

- Candlemas: 2 February – Feast of the Presentation of the Lord; 40 days after Christmas; end of Christmas/Epiphany Season.

Paganism

- Imbolc: 1 February – first day of spring in the Celtic calendar.
- Lupercalia: 15 February – A celebration of bodily autonomy, sexual liberation, and reproduction; based on the Roman end-of-winter festival of the same name.

Secular

- Groundhog Day: 2 February
- Darwin Day: 12 February
- Saint Valentine's Day: 14 February

== March ==
Paganism

- Dita e Verës, Albanian "Summer Day", spring festival: 14 March (traditionally for three days), also officially celebrated in Albania
- Ostara, Spring equinox: 21 March

Christianity

- Lent: typically in March, but sometimes in February – the six weeks preceding Easter, starting with Ash Wednesday. See "Movable"

Judaism

- Purim: typically in March, but sometimes in February. See "Movable"

Secular

- Saint David's Day: 1 March – the fixed date to honor Saint David, patron saint of Wales, celebrated by Welshmen and women globally.
- International Women's Day: 8 March
- World Kidney Day: second Thursday of March
- Pi Day: 14 March – the fixed date to celebrate UNESCO's International Day of Mathematics observed on 14 March (the 3rd month) since 3, 1, and 4 are the first three significant figures of π
- White Day: 14 March – the fixed date in which men in Asia receive gifts from women whom they had previously bought gifts for on Valentine's Day one month earlier.
- International Transgender Day of Visibility: 31 March

Islam

- Ramadan: 20 March, 2026 See "moveable".

Secular and multiple religions

- Saint Patrick's Day: 17 March – the fixed date to honor Saint Patrick has sometimes been moved by Church if it coincides with Holy Week, but the secular world generally always celebrates it on 17 March.
- World Down Syndrome Awareness Day - 21 March
- Nowruz/Newroz (نه‌ورۆز/نوروز) : spring equinox (on or near 21 March) – originally the Iranian New Year, celebrated as a secular holiday in Iran and many neighbouring countries and as a religious holiday by Alawites, Alevis, Baháʼís, Bektashis, Zoroastrians, and most Shi'a Muslims.

Maithil

- Sapta-Bipta (Maithil worship festival Sapta Mai worship)

Hinduism

- Holi (Hindu holiday in honor of Lord Vishnu)
- Dhulendi: 6 March
- Ram Navami: 28 March - Birthday of Lord Rama is celebrated all over India. The epic Ramayana is recited in temples and homes.

== April ==
Judaism

- Pesach/Passover: late March or in April. See "movable"

Buddhism

- Hanamatsuri: 8 April – Celebrated in Japan as Buddha's Birthday.

Islam

- Eid-Ul-Fitr: 9 April, 2024

Klassikanity

- World Klassik Day: 13 April – Celebrated by Klassikans as DON SANTO's Birthday.

Secular

- Ambedkar Jayanti: 14 April World Knowledge Day
- April Fools' Day: 1 April
- World Autism Awareness Day: 2 April
- Children's Day: 4 April
- South and Southeast Asian solar New Year: roughly 14 April, including Cambodian New Year, Lao New Year, Sinhalese New Year, Songkran (Thailand), Thingyan (Myanmar), and Water-Sprinkling Festival (Dais in Sipsongpanna in Yunnan, China)
- 420: 20 April, celebrated within cannabis culture
- Earth Day: 22 April
- Anzac Day: 25 April

Christianity

- Good Friday: the Friday preceding Easter Sunday, see "movable"
- Holy Saturday: also called Easter Eve, the Saturday preceding Easter Sunday, see "movable"
- Easter: typically in April, but sometimes in March or May, see "movable"
- Saint George's Day: 23 April. The date to honor Saint George is moved by Church if it coincides with the week before or after Easter Day but the secular world may not take any notice of this.

Hinduism

- Rama Navami: birth of the god Rama
- Hanuman Jayanti: typically a week after Rama Navami, in honour of the birth of Hanuman
- Gangaur: occurring in April, in honour of the victory of Goddess Mahagauri
- Maithil: occurring in April, Joor-seetal First day of Mithila calendar

Satanism

- Hexennacht: 30 April – A TST Satanic occasion solemnly honoring those who fell victim to superstition and pseudoscience, whether by witch hunt, Satanic panic, or other injustices.

== May ==
Judaism

- Yom HaShoah
- Lag BaOmer
- Shavuot: usually in May, but sometimes in June. See "Movable"

Paganism

- May Day: 1 May – a traditional spring holiday in many cultures.

Buddhism

- Vesak: Buddha's Birthday – celebrated on Vesak Full Moon by most buddhists.

Secular

- International Workers' Day: 1 May
- Star Wars Day: May the 4th
- Cinco de Mayo "May 5"
- European Union Day May 9
- Matariki: The "Maori new year" festival running between a week and month from late May, celebrated by kite flying and a range of artistic activities.
- Yom HaZikaron

Maithil

- Raib-Shain Paavein Worship of Sun and Saturn god

== June ==
- Inti Raymi: late June – festival of the Sun in Quechua, winter solstice festival in areas of the former Inca Empire, still celebrated every June in Cusco.
- We Tripantu

Hinduism

- Ratha Yatra: procession of Vishnu

Secular

- World Environment Day: 5 June
- Bloomsday: 16 June – celebration of the life and writings of James Joyce
- World Humanist Day: 21 June
- Midsummer: 21 June
- Olympic Day: 23 June
- International Day of Deafblindness: 27 June
- International LGBT Pride Day: 28 June
- Juneteenth: 19 June - to commemorate the emancipation of enslaved people in the United States

== July ==
- Yulefest/Midwinter Christmas: late June or July – Australian/New Zealander winter 'Christmas/Yuletide'
- Matariki: late June or early July – Polynesian New Year. In Hawai'i this begins the four month season of Makahiki. In New Zealand this is marked as a public holiday on the Friday closest to the last quarter period of the lunar month of Pipri in the Māori lunar calendar.

Buddhism

- Asalha Puja: Dhamma Day, celebrating the Buddha's first sermon. Held on the first full moon in Ashadha.

Hinduism

- Guru Purnima: a reverential day in honour of all teachers and instructors.
- Devshayani Ekadashi: solemnity of the repose of Vishnu, coincides with the first day of the highly inauspicious Chaturmas season.

Islam

- Eid al-Adha: 20 July

Satanism

- Unveiling Day: 25 July – A TST Satanic celebration of religious plurality and shedding archaic superstition; celebrated on the date upon which The Satanic Temple's Baphomet statue was unveiled in 2015, an icon of modern Satanism created with "respect for diversity and religious minorities" in mind.

== August ==
Christianity

- Assumption of Mary: 15 August
- Saint Bartholomew's Day: 24 August

Hinduism

- Raksha Bandhan: a festival commemorating filial love.
- Krishna Janmashtami: birth anniversary of Krishna.
- Onam: a festival of Kerala, India.

Secular

- International Friendship Day: 2 August
- International Lefthanders Day: 13 August
- International Apostrophe Day: 15 August

== September ==
Judaism

- Rosh Hashanah: usually September, sometimes early October see "Moveable"
- Yom Kippur: late September, early October see "Moveable"
- Sukkot: sometimes late September, usually October see "Moveable"

Secular

International Dates Day or World Dates Day is an international day founded by Mouhab Alawar to celebrate the date palm tree and its super fruits. It is celebrated on 22 Sep.

- Labor Day/Labour Day: first Monday of September (US/Canada)
- World Duchenne Muscular Dystrophy Awareness Day: 7 September
- International Talk Like a Pirate Day: 19 September
- World Peace Day: 21 September

Hinduism

- Ganesh Chaturthi: Commemorating the birth of Hindu god Ganesha

== October ==
Judaism

- Simchat Torah

Buddhism

- Dhammachakra Pravartan Din: a Buddhist festival in India that celebrates the Buddhist conversion of B. R. Ambedkar and his followers.

Hinduism

- Navratri: celebrates the conquest of Goddess Durga
- Diwali: mid-October–mid-November – see "movable"
- Kartik Purnima: An additional commemoration of the Celestial Diwali, or the "Diwali of the Gods"; hence the Sanskrit appellation "Dev Diwali", in honour of Vishnu, Kartikeya and Goddess Ganga.

Paganism

- Samhain: 31 October–1 November – first day of winter in the Celtic calendar (and Celtic New Year's Day)

Secular

- Gandhi Jayanti: an indoctrinated festival; the birth anniversary of Mahatma Gandhi, falls on 2 October.
- Halloween: 31 October – also known as Allhalloween, All Hallows' Eve, or All Saints' Eve, is a celebration observed in many countries on 31 October, the eve of the Western Christian feast of All Hallows' Day.
- national animal day: 4 October

== November ==
Christianity

- All Saints'/Souls' Day: 1-2 November – in Western Christian churches.
- Dia de los muertos (Day of the Dead): 1-2 November – Celebrated in mostly Catholic Mexico but with origins that predate European contact.
- Nativity Fast: forty days leading to Christmas – also Saint Philip's fast, Christmas fast, or winter Lent or fast (Eastern Christianity).

Secular

- Armistice Day (also Remembrance Day or Veterans Day): 11 November: memorial day honoring the war dead
- International Men's Day: 19 November
- Transgender Day of Remembrance: 20 November
- Thanksgiving Day: fourth Thursday of November (US); second Monday of October (CAN)

Hinduism

- Diwali: mid-October–mid-November – see "movable"
- Mandala Vratham: mid-November to mid-January – see "movable": 48 days of fasting in honour of the deity Ayyappan begins.

== December ==
Buddhism

- Bodhi Day: 8 December – Day of Enlightenment, celebrating the day that the historical Buddha (Shakyamuni or Siddhartha Gautama) experienced enlightenment (also known as Bodhi).

Christianity

- Advent: starts four Sundays before Christmas Day and ends on Christmas Eve
- Saint Barbara's Day: 4 December – The Feast of St. Barbara is celebrated by Artillery regiments across the Commonwealth and some western Catholic countries.
- Krampusnacht: 5 December – The Feast of St. Nicholas is celebrated in parts of Europe on 6 December. In Alpine countries, Saint Nicholas has a devilish companion named Krampus who punishes the bad children the night before.
- Saint Nicholas Day: 6 December
- Feast of the Immaculate Conception: 8 December – The day of Virgin Mary's Immaculate Conception is celebrated as a public holiday in many Catholic countries.
- Saint Lucy's Day: 13 December – Church Feast Day. Saint Lucy comes as a young woman with lights and sweets.
- Las Posadas: 16–24 December – procession to various family lodgings for celebration and prayer and to re-enact Mary and Joseph's journey to Bethlehem
- Longest Night: A modern Christian service to help those coping with loss, usually held on the eve of the Winter solstice.
- Nikoljdan: 19 December - the most common slava, St. Nicholas's feast day.
- Christmas Eve: 24 December – In many countries e.g. the German speaking countries, but also in Poland, Hungary and the Nordic countries, gift giving is on 24 December.
- Christmas Day: 25 December and 7 January – celebrated by Christians and non-Christians alike.
- Anastasia of Sirmium feast day: 25 December
- Twelve Days of Christmas: 25 December–6 January
- Saint Stephen's Day: 26 December – In Germany, Poland, the Czech Republic, Slovakia and Ireland a holiday celebrated as Second Day of Christmas.
- Saint John the Evangelist's Day: 27 December
- Holy Innocents' Day: 28 December
- Saint Sylvester's Day: 31 December

Enoch calendar

- Winter Day of Remembrance:

"Dates can very on the Gregorian calendar at the earliest it can start on the 18th of December and end on the 19th of December and at the latest it can start on the 25th of December and end on the 26th. It falls on the first day of the 10th month on the Enoch calendar." The winter day of Remembrance celebrates and commemorates the day that Noah was able to see the tops of the mountains in Genesis 8:5. The holiday is celebrated by 7th day Christians who keep the Enoch calendar instead of the Hebrew calendar its not celebrated by 7th day Christians who keep the Hebrew calendar or religious Jews including religious Jews who are from Ethiopia who include the books of Enoch and Jubilees in their Tanakah. 7th day Christians who keep the Enoch calendar do celebrate Festivals like Passover and Trumpets and Hannukah Purim etc. However they do it based on the Enoch calendar instead of the Hebrew calendar. The Enoch calendar does have holidays the Hebrew calendar doesn't such as the winter day of Remembrance that falls in December as well as 3 other days of Remembrance that mark the other 3 seasons and Festivals that fall in the Summer time like the Feast of New Wine and the Feast of New oil. Unlike the Hebrew calendar that is Luni solar with certain months being 29 days and other months 30 days which is why you need a 13th month every so many years. The Enoch calendar is a completely solar calendar with 12 months 8 of them 30 days and 4 of them 31 days making the year 364 days. Leap years are determined by the vernal equinox in the spring if the vernal equinox would fall on or after the spring day of Remembrance an extra week is added onto that year. As a result every Feast on the Enoch calendar only has about a 1 week difference of when it can fall on the Gregorian calendar. This also causes all holidays on the Enoch calendar to fall on the same day of the week every year. The winter day of Remembrance always starts on a Wednesday and ends on a Thursday. Some believers in the Enoch calendar observe holidays from sunset to sunset like religious Jews and 7th day Christians who keep the Hebrew calendar and like Muslims who keep the Islamic calendar and some believers in the Enoch calendar celebrate holidays from sunrise to sunrise. The result of this is that some people who mark this occasion in December will mark it from a sunrise on a Wednesday to a sunrise on a Thursday and some will observe it from sunset on a Wednesday to sunset on a Thursday. Whatever date the winter day of Remembrance was before it will be one date earlier on the Gregorian calendar if neither calendar had a leap year if the Gregorian calendar had a leap year but not the Enoch calendar it would be two dates earlier on the Gregorian calendar that year. If the Enoch calendar had a leap year it would cause the holiday to be pushed up a week later that next year. In a 5 or 6 year period the winter day of Remembrance on the Enoch calendar based on Genesis chapter 8 verse 5 as well as texts in the book of Jubilees will generally overlap with Christmas once or twice either once or two years in a row and then it will be a few years before it overlaps with Christmas again.

Hinduism

- Karthika Deepam: 3-6 December (varies per year) is a festival of lights that is observed mainly by Hindu Tamils, and also by adherents in the regions of Kerala, Andhra Pradesh, Telangana, Karnataka, and Sri Lanka. Celebrated in Tamilakam since the ancient period,[1] the festival is held on the full moon day of the Kartika (கார்த்திகை) month, called the Kartika Pournami, falling on the Gregorian months of November or December.[2] It is marked on the day the full moon is in conjunction with the constellation of Kartika.
- Pancha Ganapati: a modern five-day Hindu festival celebrated from 21 through 25 December in honor of Ganesha.
- Vaikuntha Ekadashi: Mid December - Mid January: see "moveable".

Historical

- Mōdraniht: or Mothers' Night, the Saxon winter solstice festival.
- Saturnalia: 17–23 December – An ancient Roman winter solstice festival in honor of the deity Saturn, held on 17 December of the Julian calendar and expanded with festivities through to 23 December. Celebrated with sacrifice, a public banquet, followed by private gift-giving, continual partying, and a carnival.
- Dies Natalis Solis Invicti (Day of the birth of the Unconquered Sun): 25 December – late Roman Empire

Humanism

- HumanLight: 23 December – Humanist holiday originated by the New Jersey Humanist Network in celebration of "a Humanist's vision of a good future."

Islam

- Salgirah Khushiali: 13 December – celebration of Shia Ismaili Muslims of their Imam (Aga Khan IV)

Judaism

- Hanukkah: usually falls anywhere between late November and early January. See "movable"

Paganism

- Yule: Pagan winter festival that was celebrated by the historical Germanic people from late December to early January.
- Koliada: Slavic winter festival celebrated on late December with parades and singers who visit houses and receive gifts.
- Wassailing winter celebration that lands on the first full moon of December. Celebrations include gift giving and feasts.

Persian

- Yalda: 21 December – The turning point, Winter Solstice. As the longest night of the year and the beginning of the lengthening of days, Shabe Yaldā or Shabe Chelle is an Iranian festival celebrating the victory of light and goodness over darkness and evil. Shabe yalda means 'birthday eve.' According to Persian mythology, Mithra was born at dawn on 22 December to a virgin mother. He symbolizes light, truth, goodness, strength, and friendship. Herodotus reports that this was the most important holiday of the year for contemporary Persians. In modern times Persians celebrate Yalda by staying up late or all night, a practice known as Shab Chera meaning 'night gazing'. Fruits and nuts are eaten, especially pomegranates and watermelons, whose red color invokes the crimson hues of dawn and symbolize Mithra.

Satanism

- Sol Invictus: 25 December – A TST Satanic celebration of being unconquered by superstition and consistent in the pursuit and sharing of knowledge.

Secular

- World AIDS Day: 1 December
- International Day of Disabled Persons: 3 December
- Human Rights Day: 10 December
- Zamenhof Day: 15 December – Birthday of L. L. Zamenhof, inventor of Esperanto; holiday reunion for Esperantists
- Soyal: 21 December – Zuni and Hopi
- Winter Solstice or Summer Solstice: on or about 21 December
- Dongzhi Festival – a celebration of Winter
- Festivus: 23 December – a secular holiday created by Daniel O'Keefe and then made popular by his son Dan O'Keefe, a writer on the comedy television series Seinfeld, as an alternative to Christmas
- Newtonmas: 25 December – As an alternative to celebrating the religious holiday Christmas, some atheists and skeptics have chosen to celebrate 25 December as Newtonmas, due to it being Isaac Newton's birthday on the old style date.
- Boxing Day: 26 December
- Kwanzaa: 26 December–1 January – Pan-African festival celebrated in the US
- New Year's Eve: 31 December – last day of the Gregorian year
- Ōmisoka:31 December – Japanese traditional celebration on the last day of the year
- Hogmanay: night of 31 December–before dawn of 1 January – Scottish New Year's Eve celebration
- Watch Night: 31 December

Unitarian Universalism

- Chalica: first week of December – A holiday created in 2005, celebrated by some Unitarian Universalists.

Fictional or parody

- Erastide: In David Eddings' Belgariad and Malloreon series, Erastide is a celebration of the day on which the Seven Gods created the world. Greetings ("Joyous Erastide") and gifts are exchanged, and feasts are held.
- Feast of Winter Veil: 15 December–2 January – A holiday in World of Warcraft. This holiday is based on Christmas. Cities are decorated with lights and a tree with presents. Special quests, items and snowballs are available to players during this time. The character of "Greatfather Winter", who is modeled after Santa Claus, appears. Germanic tribes used to celebrate the Winter Solstice as a time to be thankful for the blessings given to them to survive harsh winters. The term "Weil", incorrectly translated to "veil", means abundance in German.
- Feast of Alvis: in the TV series Sealab 2021. "Believer, you have forgotten the true meaning of Alvis Day. Neither is it ham, nor pomp. Nay, the true meaning of Alvis day is drinking. Drinking and revenge."–Alvis
- Hogswatch: a holiday celebrated in the fictional Discworld. It is very similar to the Christian celebration of Christmas.
- Frostvale: the winter holidays in the Artix Entertainment universe
- Decemberween: 25 December – a parody of Christmas that features gift-giving, carol-singing and decorated trees. The fact that it takes place on 25 December, the same day as Christmas, has been presented as just a coincidence, and it has been stated that Decemberween traditionally takes place "55 days after Halloween". The holiday has been featured in the Homestar Runner series.
- Wintersday, the end-of-the-year celebration in the fictional universe of the Guild Wars franchise, starts every year mid December and ends the next year on early January.
- IES Competition Time, Don's Event questions on the number of trips he took all over the world and in return offering prizes for the person who can guess closest. Follows this up with everyone's favourite Andrew Award presentation.
- Winter's Crest: the winter celebration held on the continent of Tal'Dorei in the world of Exandria, as featured in the RPG show Critical Role.
- Candlenights: pan-religious, pan-sexual, personal pan pizza winter holiday created by Justin, Travis, and Griffin McElroy. Featured on the podcasts My Brother, My Brother, and Me, and Adventure Zone.
- Snowdown: A celebration observed in Runetera, The world in which League of Legends is set. During snowdown, starting in December and ending in January "Frost-chilled days give way to colder nights, but the warmth of Snowdown calls together kindred spirits and foes alike." During this time, winter game modes, winter cosmetic map changes, and new Snowdown skins are released, as well as the previous years' Snowdown skins being made available again.
- Life Day: Wookiee celebration of life, featured in the Star Wars Holiday Special, in which Wookiees gather with family, wear long red robes, sing under sacred The Tree of Life and reminisce.
- The Dawning: A celebration of the Light of the Traveler, and a time to spread cheer and give gifts to help keep The Darkness at bay during the long days of the winter months. Celebrated in the Destiny franchise of video games.

== Movable date ==
The following festivals have no fixed date in the Gregorian calendar, and may be aligned with moon cycles or other calendars.

Chinese/Vietnamese/Korean/Mongolian/Tibetan

- Lunar New Year: late January–mid February – considered the end of winter in the traditional Lunar calendar

Persian

- Sadeh: A mid-winter feast to honor fire and to "defeat the forces of darkness, frost and cold". Sadé or Sada is an ancient Iranian tradition celebrated 50 days before Nowruz. Sadeh in Persian means "hundred" and refers to one hundred days and nights left to the beginning of the new year celebrated at the first day of spring on 21 March each year. Sadeh is a midwinter festival that was celebrated with grandeur and magnificence in ancient Iran. It was a festivity to honor fire and to defeat the forces of darkness, frost, and cold.
- Chahar Shanbeh Suri: Festival of Fire, Last Tuesday of the Iranian Calendar year. It marks the importance of the light over the darkness, and arrival of spring and revival of nature. Chahārshanbe–Sūri (Persian: چهارشنبه‌سوری), pronounced Chārshanbe–Sūri (Persian: چارشنبه‌سوری) is the ancient Iranian festival dating at least back to 1700 BCE of the early Zoroastrian era.[1] The festival of fire is a prelude to the ancient Norouz festival, which marks the arrival of spring and revival of nature. Chahrshanbeh Soori, is celebrated the last Tuesday night of the year.

Mandaeism

- Parwanaya: Five days that Hayyi Rabbi created the angels and the universe. The 5 epagomenals (extra days) inserted at the end of every Šumbulta (the 8th month) constitute the Parwanaya intercalary feast.
- Dehwa Daimana: Birthday of John the Baptist.
- Kanshi u-Zahli: New Year's Eve
- Dehwa Rabba: New Year's Day
- Dehwa d-Šišlam Rabba (Classical Mandaic: ࡃࡉࡄࡁࡀ ࡖࡔࡉࡔࡋࡀࡌ ࡓࡁࡀ) or Nauruz Zūṭa (Classical Mandaic: ࡍࡀࡅࡓࡅࡆ ࡆࡅࡈࡀ): Little New Year, on the 6th-7th days of Daula, corresponding to Epiphany in Christianity. The Night of Power takes place on the night of the 6th day (similar to Qadr Night), during which the heavenly gates of Abatur are open to the faithful. Priests visit Mandaean households and give them myrtle wreaths to hang on their houses for the rest of the year to protect against evil. The households also donate alms to the priests.
- Dehwa Hanina (Classical Mandaic: ࡃࡉࡄࡁࡀ ࡄࡍࡉࡍࡀ) or Dehwa Ṭurma: the Little Feast, begins on the 18th day of Taura. This holiday commemorates the ascension of Hibil Ziwa from the underworld to the Lightworld. The feast lasts for three days. On the first day, Mandaean families visit each other and have a special breakfast of rice, yogurt, and dates. Baptisms are performed, and the dead are commemorated with lofani (ritual meals).
- Ead Fel: (Memorial Day) Crushed dates with roasted sesame seeds are eaten.
- Ashoriya (Ashuriyah): Day of remembrance for the drowned people of Noah's flood. Grains and cereals are eaten. Mandaeans believe that on this day, Noah and his son Sam made the food of forgiveness of sins for the souls of those who died in the flood. The food of forgiveness consists of seven grains representing the seven days of the week, and from the grounding of these seven grains came the name Abu Al-Harees. (See Ashure or Noah's pudding)

Islam

- Ramadan: During this holy time, the ninth month of the Islamic calendar year, Muslims do not eat, drink, or smoke from sunrise to sunset for an entire month. Instead, they spend their days in worship, praying in mosques. At the end of Ramadan, people celebrate with a festival known as Eid al-Fitr.
- Eid al-Fitr is the earlier of the two official holidays celebrated within Islam (the other being Eid al-Adha). The religious holiday is celebrated by Muslims worldwide because it marks the end of the month-long dawn-to-sunset fasting of Ramadan. The day is also called Lesser Eid, or simply Eid
- Eid al-Adha is the latter of the two official holidays celebrated within Islam (the other being Eid al-Fitr). The day is also sometimes called Big Eid or the Greater Eid.
- Islamic New Year, also called the Hijri New Year or Arabic New Year, is the day that marks the beginning of a new lunar Hijri year, and is the day on which the year count is incremented.
- Ashura is an Islamic holiday that occurs on the tenth day of Muharram, the first month in the Islamic lunar calendar.
- Mawlid is the observance of the birthday of the Islamic prophet Muhammad which is commemorated on 12 Rabi' al-Awwal, the third month in the Islamic calendar.
- Isra and Mi'raj are the two parts of a Night Journey that, according to Islam, the Islamic prophet Muhammad (570–632) took during a single night around the year 621. The journey and ascent are marked as one of the most celebrated dates in the Islamic calendar.
- Mid-Sha'ban also Bara'at Night, is a Muslim holiday observed by Muslim communities on the night between 14 and 15 Sha'ban (the same night as Shab-e-barat)
- Day of Arafah is an Islamic holiday that falls on the 9th day of Dhu al-Hijjah of the lunar Islamic Calendar. It is the holiest day in the Islamic calendar (the holiest night being The Night of Power), the second day of the Hajj pilgrimage, and the day after is the first day of the major Islamic holiday of Eid al-Adha.

Judaism

- Pesach: late March or in April Festival celebrating the Hebrews captivity in Egypt at the time when God commanded Moses to ask for the Hebrew people to be released. As a result of being denied, 10 plagues came upon Egypt. One being the Angel of death coming and the first born son of each home dying. But God commanded the Hebrews to apply lambs blood to the door posts as a sign for the Angel to pass that house.
- Shavuot: mid May to mid June
- Rosh Hashanah: usually September, sometimes early October
- Yom Kippur: late September, early October
- Sukkot: sometimes late September, usually October
- Hanukkah – Ḥănukkāh, usually spelled חנוכה, pronounced [χanuˈka] in Modern Hebrew; a transliteration also romanized as Chanukah), also known as the Festival of Lights or the Feast of Dedication, is an eight-day Jewish holiday commemorating the re-dedication of the Holy Temple (the Second Temple) in Jerusalem at the time of the Maccabean Revolt against the Seleucid Empire of the 2nd century BC. Hanukkah is observed for eight nights and days, starting on the 25th day of Kislev according to the Hebrew calendar, which may occur at any time from late November to late December in the Gregorian calendar.
- Purim: late February, early March

Hinduism

- Diwali: mid-October–mid-November – known as the Festival of Lights, this Hindu holiday celebrates the victory of good over evil. The five-day festival is marked by ceremonies, fireworks and sweets.
- Navratri: The great nine nights of the Goddess Durga, commemorating Her victory against the demon Mahishasura.
- Kartik Purnima
- Onam
- Janamashtami
- Rama Navami
- Maha Shivaratri
- Sharad Purnima / Lakshmi Puja / Kali Puja
- Vasant Panchami
- All Hindu festivals except Gandhi Jayanti.

Slavic

- Malanka caps off the festivities of the Christmas holidays
- Maslenitsa in Slavic mythology, a celebration of the imminent end of the winter

Christian

- Shrove Tuesday: one day before Ash Wednesday, 47 days before Easter
- Easter: the first Sunday after the Paschal full moon/the first full moon after the vernal equinox—shortly after Passover; typically in April, but sometimes in March or May
- Good Friday: Good Friday is a Christian religious holiday commemorating the crucifixion of Jesus Christ and his death at Calvary. The holiday is observed during Holy Week as part of the Paschal Triduum on the Friday preceding Easter Sunday, and may coincide with the Jewish observance of Passover. It is also known as Holy Friday, Great Friday, Black Friday, or Easter Friday, though the last term properly refers to the Friday in Easter week.
- Advent: Advent is the preparation season for Christmas, when the first candle is lit on the Advent wreath and decorations go up. It starts on the first of four Sundays that precede Christmas. It can be as early as 27 November or as late as 3 December, depending on which day of the week Christmas falls. It will start on 1 December if Christmas is on a Wednesday.

Pastafarian

- Holiday: Around the time of Christmas, Hanukkah and Kwanzaa (generally known as the Christmas and holiday season), Pastafarians celebrate a vaguely defined holiday named "Holiday". Holiday does not take place on a specific date so much as it is the Holiday season itself. There are no specific requirements for Holiday, and Pastafarians celebrate Holiday however they please. They also celebrate Pastover and Ramendan.

Religion

Many religions whose holidays were formulated before the worldwide spread of the Gregorian calendar have been assigned to dates either according to their own internal religious calendar, or moon cycles, or otherwise. Even within Christianity, Easter is a movable feast and Christmas is celebrated according to the older Julian calendar instead of the Gregorian by some sects of the religion.

== See also ==
- List of holidays by country
- List of minor secular observances
