= Evolution Day =

Anniversary of publication of On the Origin of Species, 24 November

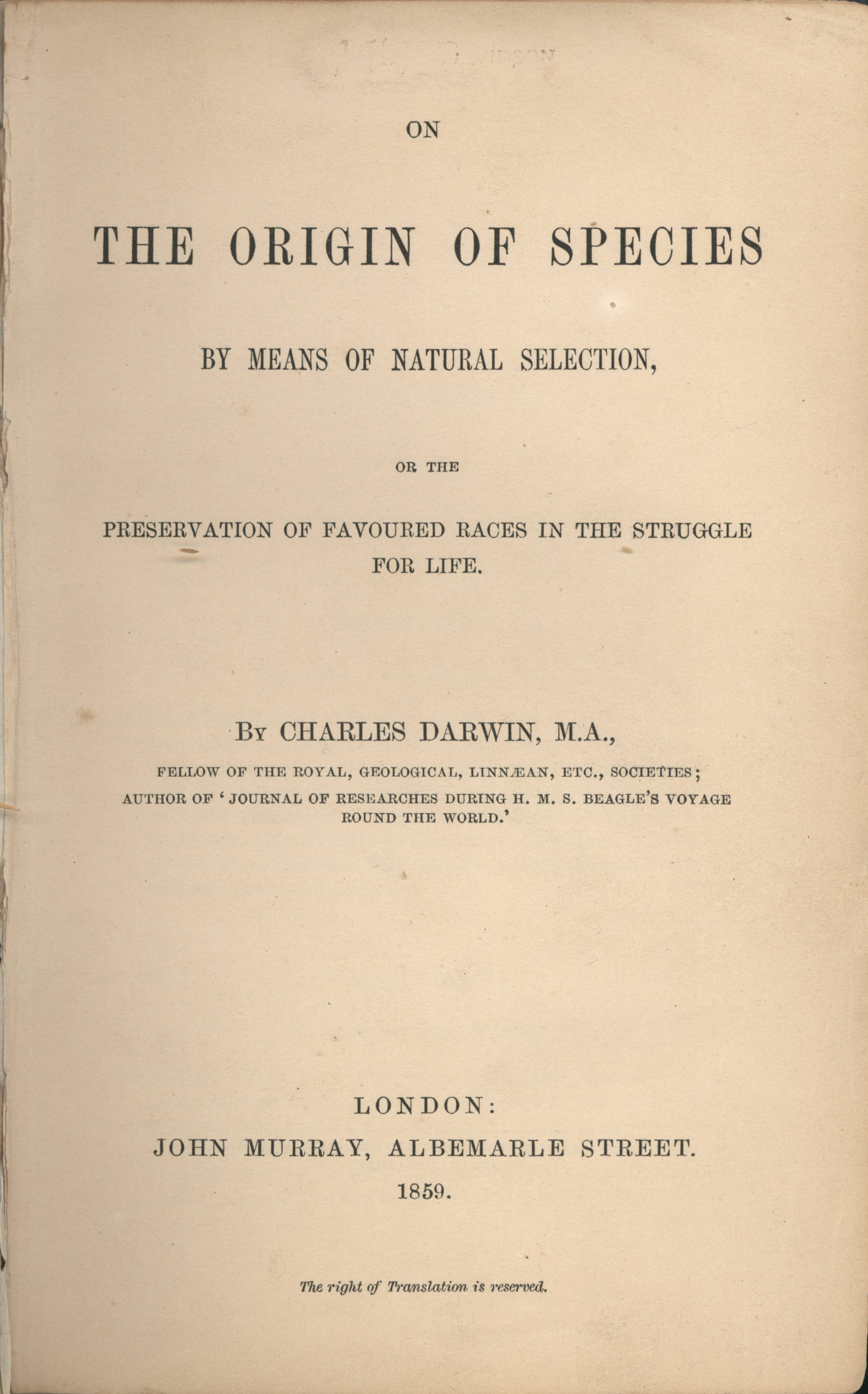
- The title page of the first (1859) edition of On the Origin of Species by Charles Darwin
- Observed by: Humanists and others
- Type: Historical
- Significance: The anniversary of the initial publication of Darwin's Origin of Species, which introduced the concepts of evolution and natural selection to the public.
- Date: 24 November
- Next time: 24 November 2026
- Frequency: annual
- Related to: Darwin Day

Evolution Day is a celebration to commemorate the anniversary of the initial publication of On the Origin of Species by Charles Darwin on 24 November 1859. Such celebrations have been held for over a century, but the specific term "Evolution Day" for the anniversary appears to be a neologism which was coined prior to 1997. By highlighting Darwin's contributions to science, the day's events are used to educate about evolutionary biology. It is similar to the better-known Darwin Day, held on the anniversary of his birth (12 February 1809). It is unrelated to the secularization campaign by the Giordano Bruno Foundation to have the German public holiday of Ascension Day renamed to "Evolutionstag" (Evolution Day).

== Commemorations ==
The year 1909, the 50th anniversary of the publication of On The Origin of Species and the 100th anniversary of Darwin's birth, saw several major events celebrating both. At Cambridge, more than 400 scientists and dignitaries from 167 countries met in a widely reported event of public interest to honour Darwin's contributions and discuss the latest discoveries and ideas related to evolution, the New York Academy of Sciences held a celebration at the American Museum of Natural History, and the Royal Society of New Zealand held an event with "a very large attendance".

The Darwin Centennial Celebration (1959) had a major, well publicised event from 24–28 November at the University of Chicago.

In 2009, the BBC aired BBC Darwin Season, a series of television and radio programs, to celebrate Darwin's bicentenary and the 150th anniversary of the publication of the Origin.

== See also ==
- Evolution Sunday
