= Michael Zimmerman (historian) =

German historian (1951–2007)

See Michael Zimmerman for other people by a similar name.

Michael Zimmermann (17 November 1951 – 20 January 2007) was a German historian, best known for his book on the Nazi extermination of the Sinti and Romani people, Rassenutopie und Genozid: Die Nationalsozialistiche Loesung der Zigeuner Frage (1996).

Zimmermann worked as a historian with the city of Essen (directing an exhibition project on Essen under National Socialist rule), and was an assistant professor at Bochum University; he was also a visiting professor at the Institute for Contemporary History at the University of Vienna. He published many works on the history of Gypsies in Germany and Central Europe, and on the history of German Jewry, as well as on the subjects of National Socialism and racism in general.
