= World Humanist Day =

Humanist holiday

World Humanist Day is a Humanist holiday celebrated annually around the world on the June solstice, which usually falls on June 21. According to Humanists International, the day is a way of spreading awareness of Humanism as a philosophical life stance and means to effect change in the world. It is also seen as a time for Humanists to gather socially and promote the positive values of Humanism.

== History ==
The holiday developed during the 1980s as several chapters of the American Humanist Association (AHA) began to celebrate it. At the time, the date on which it was celebrated varied from chapter to chapter, with selections such as the founding date of the IHEU, or other significant dates. From the late 1980s to the early 1990s, the AHA and IHEU passed resolutions declaring World Humanist Day to be on the northern summer solstice.

== Format and activities ==
The manner in which World Humanist Day is celebrated varies considerably among local Humanist groups, reflecting the individuality and non-dogmatism of Humanism as a whole. Whilst the event might be a simple gathering, such as a dinner or picnic, with ample time for both socialising and reflection, the method of celebration is down to the individual Humanists. Some groups actually develop intricate social rituals, music, and proceedings which highlight the metaphoric symbolism of the solstice and the light (knowledge) which brings us out of darkness (ignorance).

== Today ==
World Humanist Day is a holiday in many Humanist organizations; many of them recognize it and plan events and activities around the holiday. Humanists International lists several different ways that national and local Humanist groups celebrate World Humanist Day. For example, the Dutch Humanistisch Verbond broadcast short films about World Humanist Day on Dutch TV in 2012. In 2013, the first National Humanist Day was organized in The Netherlands. The Humanist Association of Ireland held poetry readings in the park to celebrate the day. The Humanists of Florida Association has recommended groups hold Introduction to Humanism classes on World Humanist Day.

== See also ==
- Darwin Day
- Human Rights Day
- HumanLight
- Solstice
- World Humanitarian Day
