= National Day of the Deaf =

Brazilian commemorative day

The National Day of the Deaf (Portuguese: Dia Nacional dos Surdos) is a national commemorative day in Brazil. This commemorative day was created by the law n. 11,796 (October 29, 2008), inviting citizens to reflection on the rights and inclusion of deaf people in Brazilian society.

The date chosen was September 26 since the first deaf school was created in the country on this day, in 1857. Nowadays, the institution still exists as the National Institute for Deaf Education.

== See also ==
- Deaf history in Brazil
- International Week of the Deaf
- International Day of Sign Languages
