= International Day of Sign Languages =

Annual UN observance on September 23

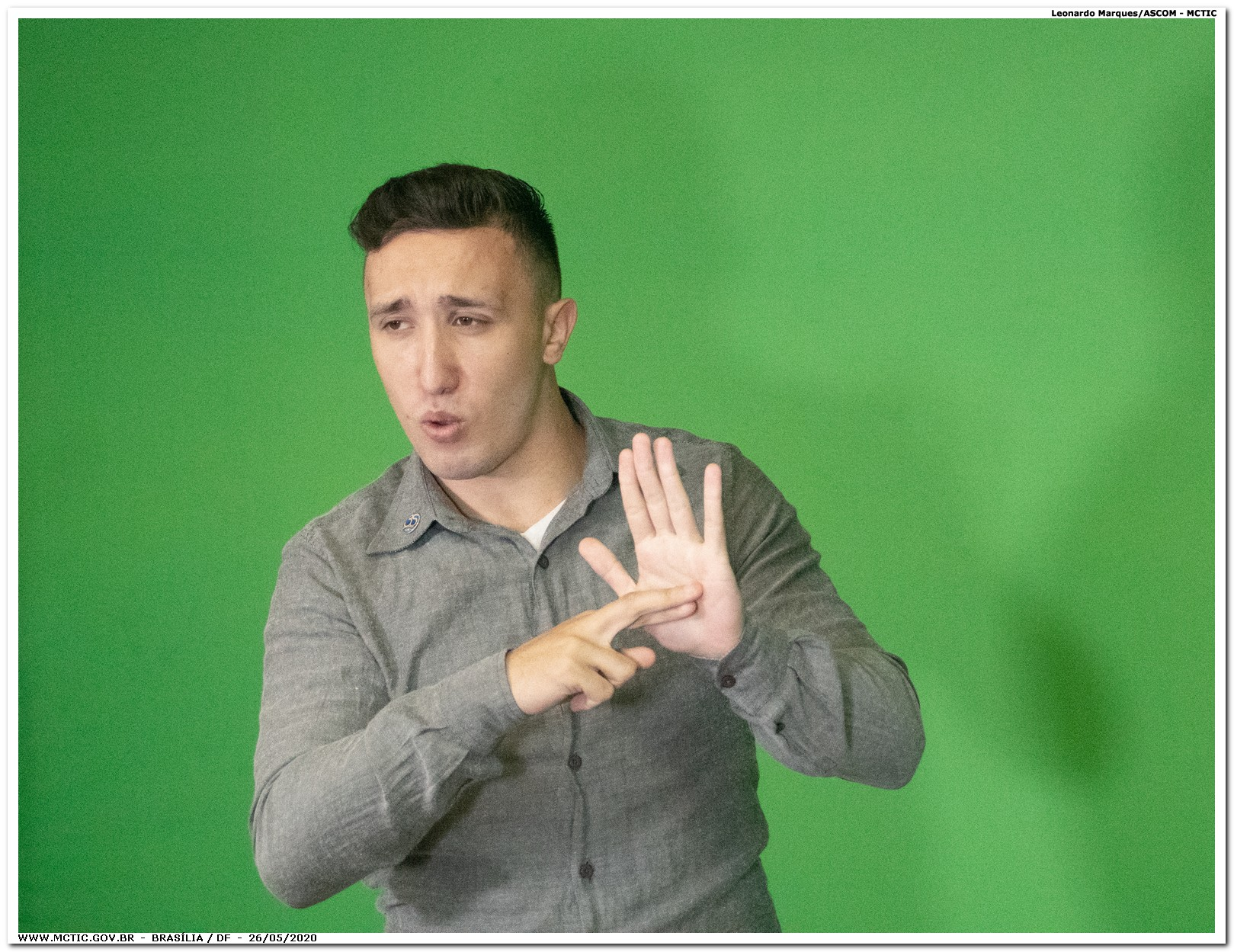
- The official logo of International Day of Sign Languages
- Also called: IDSL
- Observed by: Worldwide
- Begins: 23 September 2018 (7 years ago)
- Date: 23 September
- Next time: 23 September 2026
- Duration: 1 week
- Frequency: annual
- Related to: International Week of the Deaf

International Day of Sign Languages (IDSL) is celebrated annually across the world on 23 September, taking place during International Week of the Deaf.

The day was established by the United Nations General Assembly and first celebrated in 2018. September 23rd was chosen as the day on which the World Federation of the Deaf was established in 1951. The resolution establishing the IDSL references the 2006 UN Convention On The Rights Of Persons With Disabilities (CRPD) and its call to "recognize, accept and promote the use of sign languages" as a major factor in establishing the day of observance.

== Themes ==
- 2018: With Sign Language, Everyone is Included!
- 2019: Sign Language Rights for All!
- 2020: Sign Languages Are for Everyone!
- 2021: We Sign for Human Rights!
- 2022: Sign Languages Unite Us!
- 2023: A World Where Deaf People Everywhere Can Sign Anywhere!
- 2024: Sign up for sign language rights!
- 2025: No Human Rights Without Sign Language Rights
- 2026: Declaring Deaf People’s Human Rights

== See also ==
- World Braille Day - 4 January
- National Day of the Deaf (Brazil) - 26 September
- International Day for Universal Access to Information - 28 September
- International Day of Persons with Disabilities - 3 December
- International Year for Disabled Persons (1981)
