= Darwin Day =

Annual commemoration of Charles Darwin and science

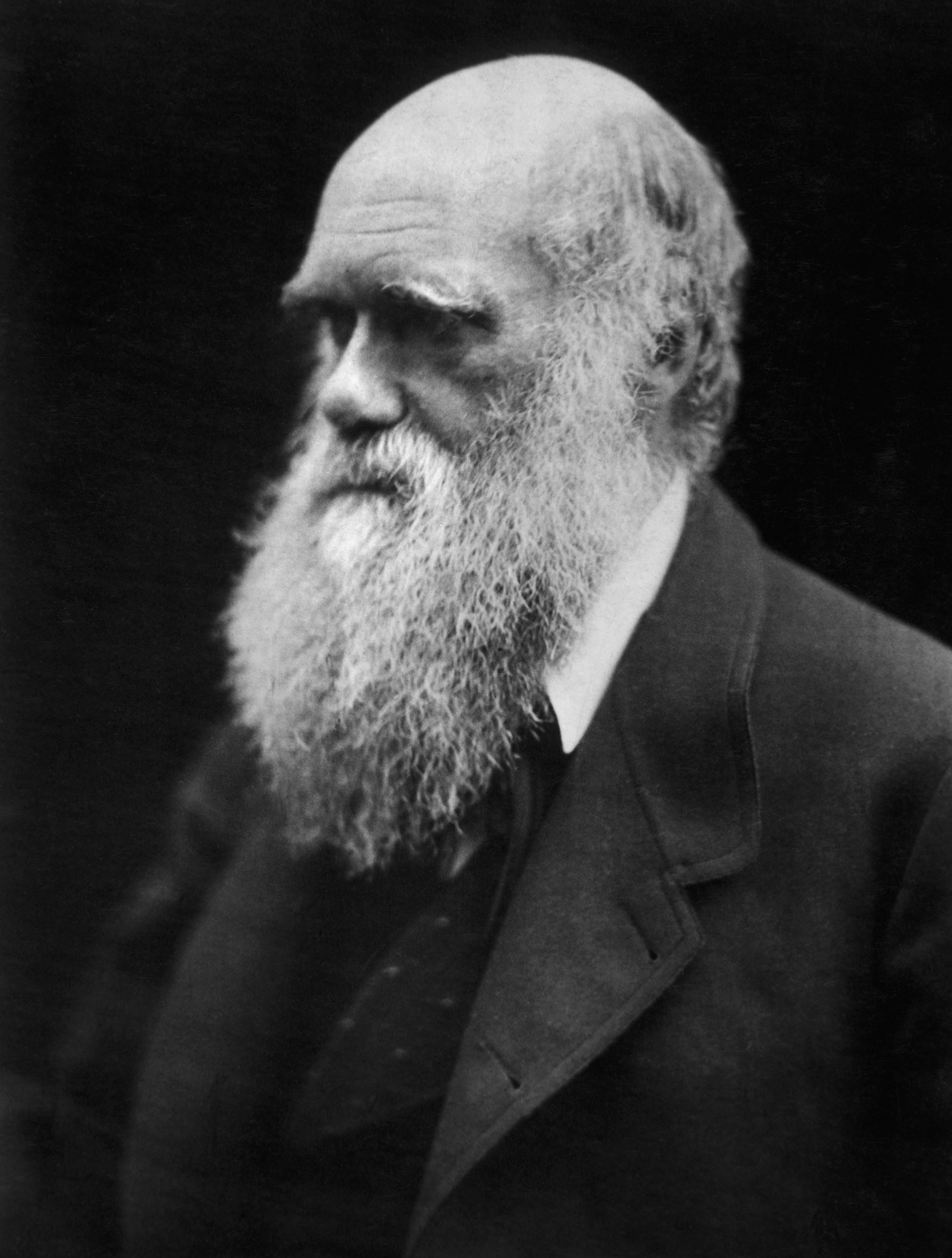
- Darwin at 59
- Observed by: Various groups and individuals
- Significance: The day celebrates Darwin's life and work
- Celebrations: Various
- Date: 12 February
- Next time: 12 February 2027
- Frequency: annual

Darwin Day is a celebration to commemorate the birthday of Charles Darwin on 12 February 1809. The day is used to highlight Darwin's contributions to science and to promote science in general. Darwin Day is celebrated around the world.

== History ==
The celebration of Darwin's work and tributes to his life have been organised sporadically since his death on 19 April 1882, at age 73. Events took place at Down House, in Downe on the southern outskirts of London where Darwin and members of his family lived from 1842 until the death of his wife, Emma Darwin, in 1896.

In 1909, more than 400 scientists and dignitaries from 167 countries met in Cambridge to honour Darwin's contributions and to discuss vigorously the recent discoveries and related theories contesting for acceptance. This was a widely reported event of public interest. Also in 1909, on 12 February, the 100th birth anniversary of Darwin and the 50th anniversary of the publication of On The Origin of Species were celebrated by the New York Academy of Sciences at the American Museum of Natural History. A bronze bust of Darwin was unveiled. On 2 June 1909 the Royal Society of New Zealand held a "Darwin Celebration". "There was a very large attendance."

On 24–28 November 1959, The University of Chicago held a major celebration of Darwin and the publication of On the Origin of Species, the largest event of the Darwin Centennial Celebration. Scientists and academics sometimes celebrated 12 February with "Phylum Feast" events—a meal with foods from as many different phyla as they could manage, at least as early as 1972, 1974, and 1989 in Canada. In the United States, Salem State College in Massachusetts has held a "Darwin Festival" annually since 1980, and in 2005, registered "Darwin Festival" as a service mark with the US Patent and Trademark Office.

The Humanist Community of Palo Alto, California, was motivated by Dr. Robert Stephens in late 1993 to begin planning for an annual Darwin Day celebration. Its first public Darwin Day event was a lecture by Dr. Donald Johanson (discoverer of the early hominid "Lucy"), sponsored by the Stanford Humanists student group and the Humanist Community on 22 April 1995. The Humanist Community continues its annual celebration.

In the early 1990s, The London Evolution Group was formed to bring together London-area evolutionary biologists, especially from University College London, the Natural History Museum, London, and Imperial College, as well as other universities and research institutions in and around London. Their first official meeting, named the "Darwin's Birthday Party" was held at the Linnean Society of London in 1994. The evolution of this Darwin celebration is detailed further below.

Independently, in 1997, Professor Massimo Pigliucci initiated an annual Darwin Day event at the University of Tennessee. The event included public lectures and activities as well as a teachers' workshop meant to help elementary and secondary school teachers better understand evolution and how to communicate it to their students, as well as how to deal with the pressures often placed on them by the creationism movement.

=== 2009 ===
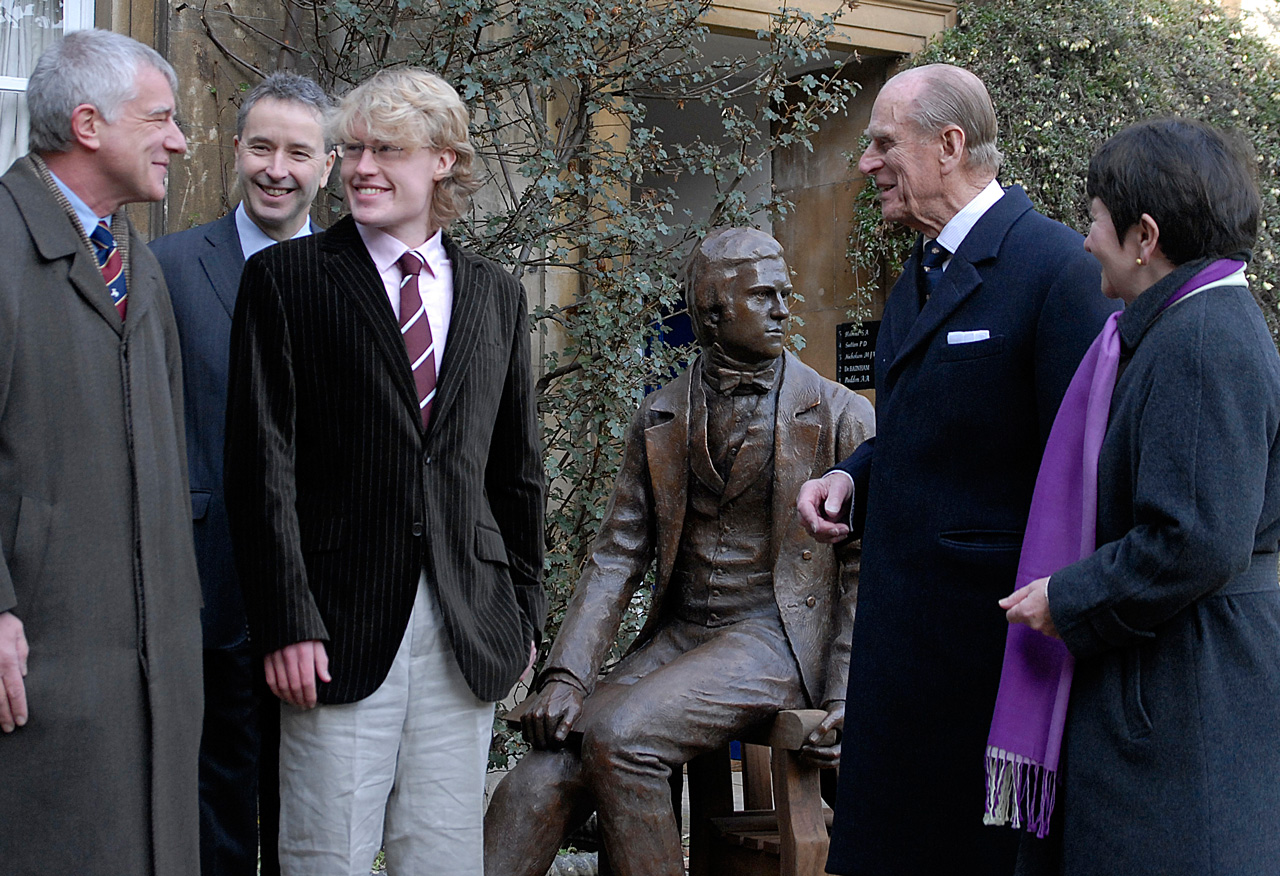
Unveiling of the Young Darwin statue at Christ's College, Cambridge. Left to right: Alan Smith, benefactor; Frank Kelly, Master; Anthony Smith; Prince Philip, Duke of Edinburgh, Chancellor; Alison Richard, Vice-Chancellor.

2009 was the 200th anniversary of Darwin's birth and it also marked the 150th anniversary of the publication of Darwin's On the Origin of Species. Events were planned, with the most prominent celebrations in Shrewsbury, the University of Cambridge and at the Natural History Museum in London.

Darwin's alma mater, Christ's College, Cambridge, commemorated the bicentenary with the unveiling of a life-sized bronze statue of the Young Darwin, sculpted by their graduate Anthony Smith. Prince Philip (then-chancellor of the university) unveiled the statue and it was later shortlisted for the Marsh Award for Excellence in Public Sculpture 2009. The same year, two well known evolutionary biologists, Richard Dawkins and Jerry Coyne, published book length treatments covering the evidence for evolution.

The Perth Mint, Australia launched a 2009 dated commemorative 1-ounce silver legal tender coin depicting Darwin, young and old; HMS Beagle; and Darwin's signature.

The bicentenary was also celebrated by the release of a Darwin biopic, Creation, directed by Jon Amiel and starring Paul Bettany and Jennifer Connelly.

=== Later ===
On 9 February 2011, California Representative Pete Stark introduced H. Res 81 to Congress designating 12 February 2011 as Darwin Day, calling Darwin "a worthy symbol of scientific advancement... and around which to build a global celebration of science and humanity." The resolution was a culmination of collaboration between Stark and the American Humanist Association, which had awarded Stark the Humanist of the Year award in 2008. In a statement on the House floor, Rep. Stark said, "Darwin's birthday is a good time for us to reflect on the important role of science in our society." In a press release from the American Humanist Association, executive director Roy Speckhardt said, "Stark's Darwin Day resolution is a thrilling step forward for the secular movement. Not only is this an opportunity to bring the scientific impact of Charles Darwin to the forefront, but this also signifies the potential for greater respect for scientific reasoning on Capitol Hill."

On 22 January 2013, New Jersey Representative Rush D. Holt, Jr., a Quaker Christian and nuclear physicist, introduced a resolution to the United States Congress designating 12 February 2013 (Charles Darwin's 204th birthday) as "Darwin Day" to recognise "the importance of sciences in the betterment of humanity". In 2015, Delaware's governor Jack Markell declared 12 February "Charles Darwin Day", making Delaware the first state in America to formally mark the occasion. House Resolution 67, introduced by Representative Jim Himes in the United States House of Representatives on 2 February 2015 would designate 12 February as Darwin Day in the United States. It would recognise Darwin as "a worthy symbol on which to focus...a global celebration of science and humanity."

== Darwin Day Program and Darwin Day Celebration ==
In 1992, "The London Evolution Group" was formed by evolutionary biologist James Mallet and systematic botanist Sandra Knapp. At first, this consisted of little more than a mailing list of evolutionary biologists in the London area. By 1994 plans had coalesced around an annual "Darwin's Birthday Party" at the Linnean Society of London in Piccadilly on or around 12 February to celebrate Darwin's work. The program consisted of two speakers, sometimes on opposite sides of some evolutionary question, followed by question and answer session and finally a reception. The program continues today in collaboration with the Centre for Ecology and Evolution (CEE), a London-area multi-institution consortium to host talks on evolutionary topics. Major players are University College London, the Linnean Society of London and the Natural History Museum, London, but many other universities and research institutions are involved. Today the annual February celebration is titled "Darwin Birthday Debate", but the spirit very much lives on.

In the late 1990s, two Darwin enthusiasts, Amanda Chesworth and Robert Stephens, co-founded an unofficial effort to promote Darwin Day. In 2001, Chesworth moved to New Mexico and incorporated the "Darwin Day Program". Stephens became chairman of the board and President of this nonprofit corporation with Massimo Pigliucci as Vice-President and Amanda Chesworth as member of the Board, Secretary, and Executive Director. Stephens presented the objectives of the organisation in an article titled "Darwin Day An International Celebration."

In 2002, Chesworth compiled and edited a substantial book entitled Darwin Day Collection One: the Single Best Idea, Ever. The objectives of the book were to show the multidisciplinary reach of Charles Darwin and to meld academic work with popular culture.

In 2004, the New Mexico corporation was dissolved and all its assets assigned to the "Darwin Day Celebration", a non-profit organisation incorporated in California in 2004 by Dr. Robert Stephens and others and the Mission Statement was expanded.

Darwin Day Celebration redesigned the website, from a static presentation of information about the Darwin Day Program to a combination of education about Darwin and the Darwin Day Celebration organisation, including automated registration and publication of planned and past celebratory Events and the automated registration of people who want to receive emailings or make public declaration of support for Darwin Day. The website is now operated by the International Darwin Day Foundation, an autonomous program of the American Humanist Association.

Darwin Day is also celebrated by the University of Georgia. The event is co-sponsored by the Franklin College of Arts and Sciences, Division of Biological Sciences, Odum School of Ecology and the departments of cellular biology, plant biology, and genetics. Mark Farmer, a professor and division chair of biological sciences and organiser of Darwin Day at UGA. Farmer said he got the idea from the International Darwin Day Foundation and brought the event to UGA in 2009 in time for the 150th anniversary of the publication of "Origin of Species" and the 200th anniversary of Darwin's birth. The university celebrates the impact that Darwin's work had on the scientific community through a series of lectures around campus.

The Ethical Humanist Society of Long Island celebrates with programs that appeal to children and adults both. The Clergy Letter Project encourages evolution-affirming churches to participate in Evolution Weekend, on the Sunday closest to this date, to learn about and discuss evolution.

Darwin Day and Darwin week is also celebrated at Southern Illinois University, and has been celebrated annually since 2006 when it commenced with a talk by Tim Berra.

== Events ==
Various events are conducted on Darwin Day around the world. They have included dinner parties with special recipes for primordial soup and other inventive dishes, protests with school boards and other governmental bodies, workshops and symposia, distribution of information by people in ape costumes, lectures and debates, essay and art competitions, concerts, poetry readings, plays, artwork, comedy routines, re-enactments of the Scopes Trial and of the debate between Thomas H. Huxley and Bishop Samuel Wilberforce, library displays, museum exhibits, travel and educational tours, recreations of the journey of HMS Beagle, church sermons, movie nights, outreach, and nature hikes. The Darwin Day Celebration Web site offers free registration and display of all Darwin Day events. Some celebrants also combine Darwin Day with a celebration of Abraham Lincoln's Birthday (February 12th). Still others celebrate the many noted individuals that influenced or were influenced by Darwin's work, such as Thomas H. Huxley, Charles Lyell, Alfred Russel Wallace, Carl Sagan, and Ernst Mayr.

== Supporters ==
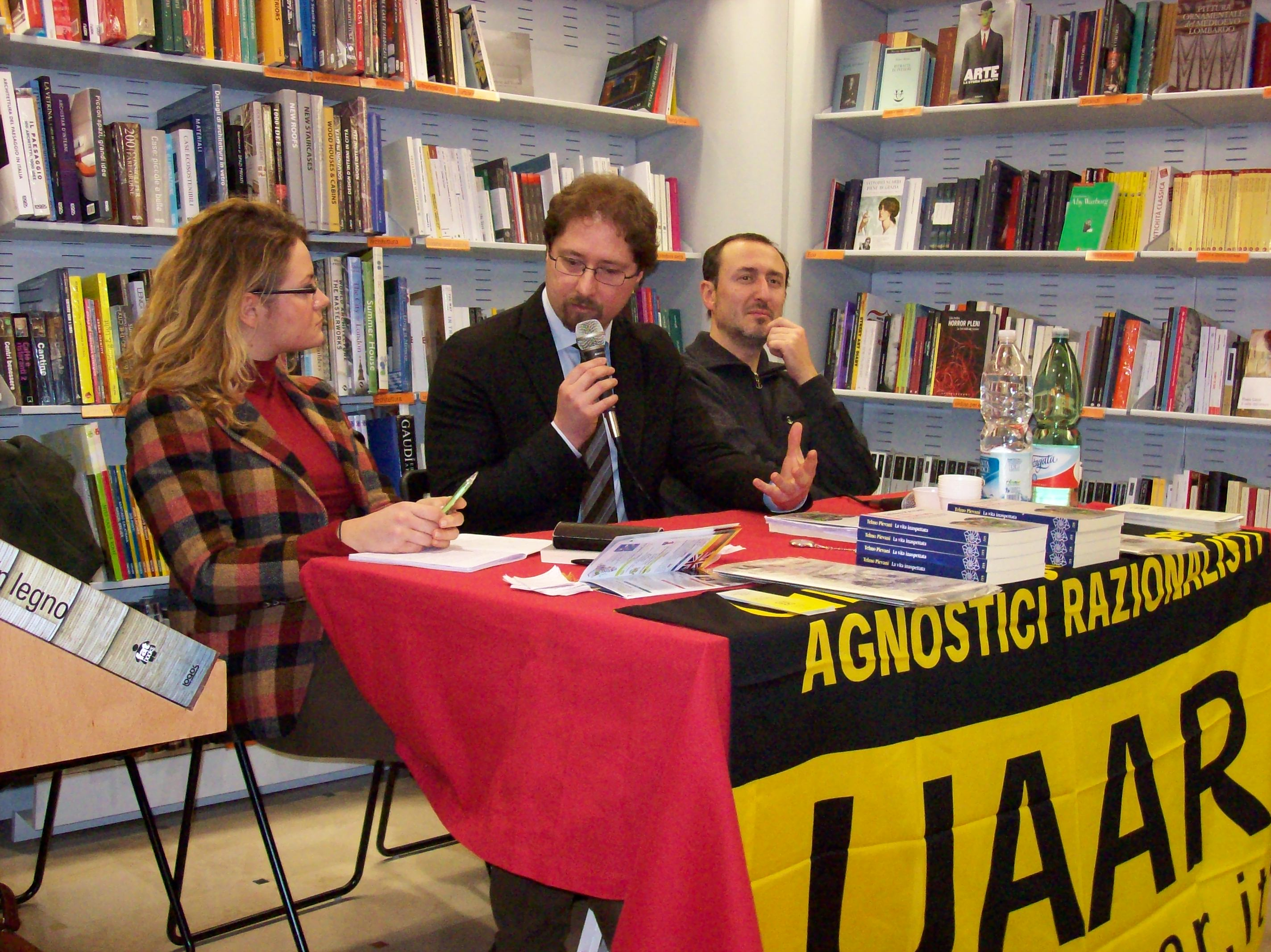
Philosopher Telmo Pievani in Rome at the 2012 Darwin Day organised by UAAR.

Support for Darwin Day comes from both secular and religious organisations. Many Christians who support the concept of evolutionary creation, such as the Biologos Foundation and GC Science, celebrate Darwin Day, believing that evolution was a tool used by God in the creation process. Some free-thought organisations that support Darwin Day include Council for Secular Humanism, The Freedom from Religion Foundation, the Humanist Association of Canada the Center for Inquiry and the American Humanist Association in the United States, as well as the British Humanist Association in the UK, have helped to spread awareness about Darwin Day. In 1999, the Campus Freethought Alliance and the Alliance for Secular Humanist Societies began promoting Darwin Day among members. Humanist and sceptic groups welcomed the event and an increase in celebrations on or around 12 February spread across the US and in several other countries. The organizers behind this effort included the International Humanist and Ethical Union, Massimo Pigliucci, Amanda Chesworth, and Joann Mooney.

D. J. Grothe continues to champion this effort among groups associated with the Center for Inquiry. The Center's branches across the world also organise Darwin Day events. Free Inquiry magazine, the flagship publication of the Council for Secular Humanism, and Skeptical Inquirer, the flagship publication of the Committee for Skeptical Inquiry, advertised the event and attracted further individuals and groups. The Secular Student Alliance, and other organisations committed to reason and rationality also participate in the annual celebration.

With Robert Stephens, a scientist, as its President, Darwin Day Celebration has received support from scientists and science enthusiasts across the globe. Educators began to participate by offering special lessons to their students on or around 12 February. Darwin Day Celebration has joined COPUS, the Coalition on the Public Understanding of Science, reflecting an increased emphasis on science education and appreciation.

Public relations emails to major publications led to coverage by media such as The Guardian in the UK, Scientific American, New Scientist, the Discovery Channel. In 2006 Darwin Day was covered by major news syndicates such as Associated Press, Knight-Ridder, and The New York Times. Over 150 articles appeared in major newspapers across the world and helped to attract more participants.

Scientific organisations such as the National Center for Science Education, and the Linnaean Society, have endorsed the holiday. Scientists, philosophers, historians, and physicians lent their names in support of the effort, including Daniel Dennett, Steven Pinker, Eugenie Scott, Steven Jones, Elliott Sober, Sir John Maddox, Helena Cronin, William Calvin, John Rennie, Paul Kurtz, Carl Zimmer, Edward O. Wilson, Michael Shermer, Susan Blackmore, Michael Ruse, Richard Leakey, Niles Eldridge, and Colin Tudge. Musicians and entertainers such as Richard Miller and Stephen Baird also participated.

In 2004, Michael Zimmerman, a professor of biology and dean of the College of Liberal Arts and Sciences at Butler University, founded the Clergy Letter Project in which over 11,100 clergy, as of 18 April 2008, have signed a declaration that a person of faith does not have to choose either belief in God or belief in evolution. In 2006 Zimmerman developed the Evolution Sunday movement. In 2007 lectures and sermons were presented to roughly 618 congregations across the United States and five other countries, on Darwin's birthday. Evolution Sunday is intended to show that faith and evolutionary science are compatible in many religious traditions. In 2008, Evolution Sunday was expanded to an Evolution Weekend to incorporate a wider range of faith traditions and 814 congregations from nine countries participated.

== See also ==
- BBC Darwin Season
- Evolution Day
- HumanLight
