= Human Rights Day =

International annual celebration of human rights

- Human Rights Logo, unveiled in New York on 23 September 2011
- Also called: HRD
- Observed by: UN Members
- Celebrations: Worldwide
- Begins: 1948; 78 years ago
- Date: 10 December
- Duration: 5 days
- Frequency: Annual

Human Rights Day (HRD) is celebrated annually around the world on 10 December.

The date was chosen to honor the United Nations General Assembly's adoption and proclamation, on 10 December 1948, of the Universal Declaration of Human Rights (UDHR), the first global enunciation of human rights and one of the first major achievements of the new United Nations. The formal establishment of Human Rights Day occurred at the 317th Plenary Meeting of the General Assembly on 4 December 1950, when the General Assembly declared resolution 423(V), inviting all member states and any other interested organizations to celebrate the day as they saw fit.

The day is normally marked both by high-level political conferences and meetings and by cultural events and exhibitions dealing with human rights issues. Besides, it is traditionally on 10 December that the five-yearly United Nations Prize in the Field of Human Rights and Nobel Peace Prize are awarded. Many governmental and non-governmental organizations active in the human rights field also schedule special events to commemorate the day, as do many civil and social-cause organisations.

== History ==
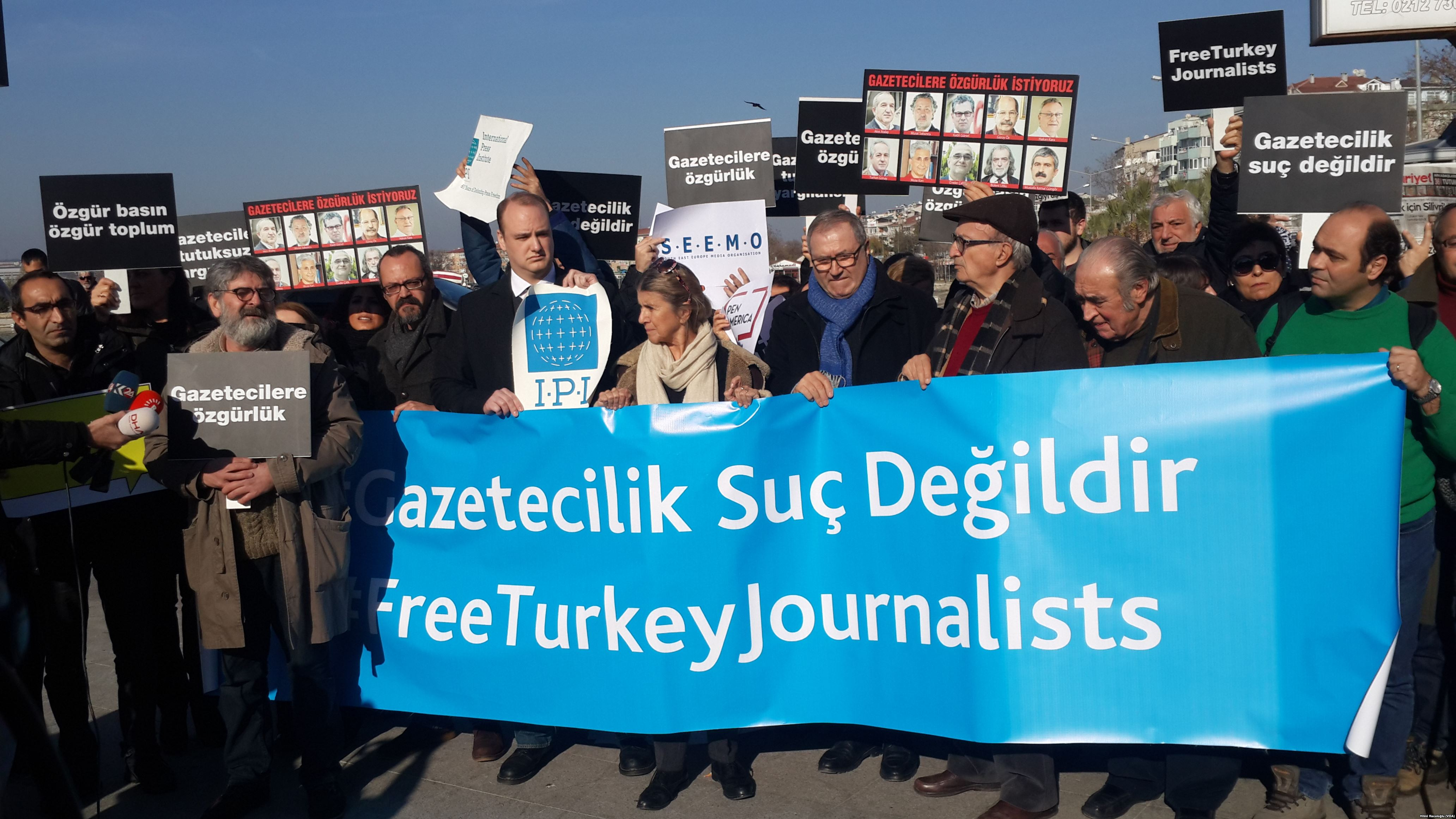
Turkish journalists protesting imprisonment of their colleagues, 10 December 2016

Human Rights Day is the day in 1948 the United Nations General Assembly adopted the Universal Declaration of Human Rights.

The formal inception of Human Rights Day dates from 1950, after the Assembly passed resolution 423(V) inviting all States and interested organisations to adopt 10 December of each year as Human Rights Day. The popularity of the day can be shown by the fact that the commemorative Human Rights Day stamp issued by the United Nations Postal Administration in 1952, received approximately 200,000 advance orders.

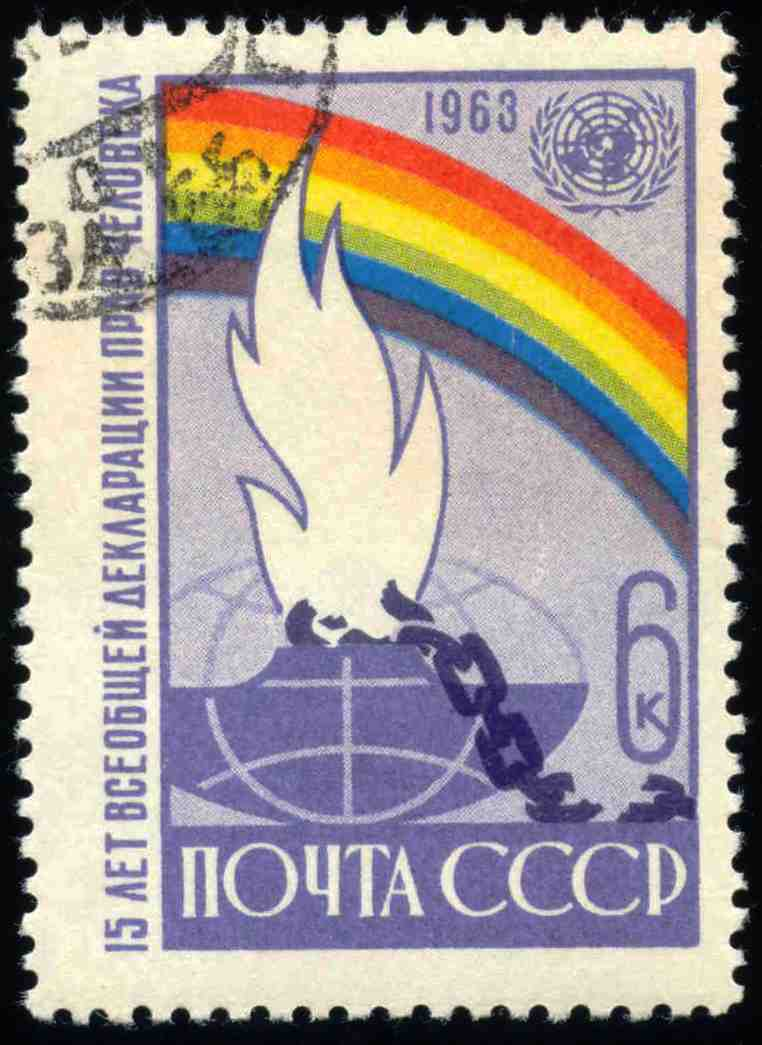
A 1963 postage stamp from Soviet Union, commemorating the 15th anniversary of the Universal Declaration of Human Rights

When the General Assembly adopted the Declaration, with 48 states in favor and eight abstentions, it was proclaimed as a "common standard of achievement for all peoples and all nations", towards which individuals and societies should "strive by progressive measures, national and international, to secure their universal and effective recognition and observance". The measure was received by both advocates and critics alike as "being more declarative than legislative, more suggestive than binding."

Although the Declaration with its broad range of political, civil, economic, social and cultural rights is not a binding document, it inspired more than 60 human rights instruments which together constitute an international standard of human rights. Today the general consent of all United Nations Member States on the basic Human Rights laid down in the Declaration makes it even stronger and emphasizes the relevance of Human Rights in our daily lives.

The High Commissioner for Human Rights, as the main United Nations rights official and his Office plays a major role in coordinating efforts for the yearly observation of Human Rights Day:

Today, poverty prevails as the gravest human rights challenge in the world. Combating poverty, deprivation and exclusion is not a matter of charity, and it does not depend on how rich a country is. By tackling poverty as a matter of human rights obligation, the world will have a better chance of abolishing this scourge in our lifetime... Poverty eradication is an achievable goal.

— UN High Commissioner for Human Rights Louise Arbour, 10 December 2006

The 60th anniversary of the Universal Declaration of Human Rights occurred on 10 December 2008, and the UN Secretary-General launched a year-long campaign leading up to this anniversary. Because the UDHR holds the world record as the most translated document (except for the Bible), organizations around the globe used the year to focus on helping people everywhere learn about their rights.

On 9 December 2001, President George W. Bush made a Presidential proclamation that Human Rights Week began on 9 December. He also made the same proclamation on 10 December 2008.

== Past observances ==
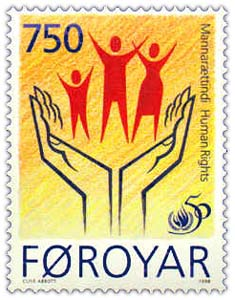
A 1998 postage stamp from Faroe Islands

Year	Actions
1979	Shih Ming-teh organized a human rights campaign in Kaohsiung, Taiwan. This led to the Kaohsiung Incident characterized by three rounds of arrests and mock trials of political opponents of the ruling Kuomintang party and their subsequent imprisonment.
1983	President Raúl Alfonsin, of Argentina, decided to assume office on 10 December 1983, ending the military dictatorship that had ruled the country since 1976. The election of that day for his inauguration was related to human rights violations committed during the dictatorship. From then on, all presidential inaugurations have taken place on 10 December.
2004	International PEN announced the launch of a new campaign to secure the release from prison of "cyber-dissidents" in PR China, Maldives and Vietnam.; The Inter-American Commission on Human Rights, the UN's Special Representative for Human Rights Defenders and the African Union's Commission on Human and Peoples' Rights issued a joint communiqué in which they commended the European Union for its recent adoption of a set of guidelines for protecting human rights defenders and urged the world's other regions to take similar steps in that direction.; The American Association for the Advancement of Science organised a seminar in New York City on academic freedom in Iraq.; Human Rights Day is endorsed by the International Humanist and Ethical Union (IHEU) as an official day of Humanist celebration.
2006	In an interesting coincidence, former Chilean dictator Augusto Pinochet, known for human rights violations committed during his authoritarian rule, died of a heart attack on 10 December 2006, at the age of 91.
2008	Gay rights activists in the U.S. state of California urged people to support equal rights by "calling in 'gay'" to work. This was in response to the renewed ban on gay marriage when Proposition 8 passed earlier in the year.; Several people were detained in China after around 300 people signed an online petition titled Charter 08 for the government to improve human rights in the country. In Beijing, a small protest was broken up that took place outside the foreign ministry.; UNYA Australia celebrated Human Rights Day with the write4rights campaign, asking young people to contribute a message about human rights by phone or on a website for display in Australian State capital cities.; Amnesty International organised a large event in Paris, France, to commemorate the 60th anniversary of the UN resolution.; Celebrations took place in Phnom Penh and around Cambodia, including a march by 5000 people, and a further 1000 people releasing balloons, organised by NGOs.; Other celebrations and events took place in Russia and India.
2009	10 December 2009 marked as 61st anniversary of the Universal Declaration of Human Rights. Tom Malinowski from Human Rights Watch in Washington, D.C., commented that there had been progress in human rights over the last 40 years: "I think there is greater awareness around the world that people have fundamental rights and that those rights are enshrined in both law domestically and internationally".
2011	Following a year of protest in many countries, from Tunisia to Cairo to the Occupy movement, the theme of 2011 recognised the significance of social media and technology in assisting human rights defenders in new ways.
2012	Inclusion and the right to participate in public life was the theme of 2012 Human Rights Day. The focus in 2012 was on all people to make their voices heard and be included in political decision making. "My Voice Counts" slogan was seen in the occupy movement around the world in protest of economic, political and social inequality.
2013	Celebrating twenty years working for your rights was the theme of the 2013 Human Rights Day celebration. Twenty Years ago the creation of the position of the High Commissioner for Human Rights was established which empowered an official, independent voice to speak worldwide for human rights.
2014	Every day is Human Rights Day is the slogan for the year 2014. Human Rights 365 celebrates the Universal Declaration on Human Rights which states that everyone, everywhere, at all times are entitled to their human rights. Human Rights belong to everyone equally and "binds us together as a global community with the same ideals and values."
2015	The theme for 2015 is "Our Rights, Our Freedoms, Always."
2016	The theme for 2016 is "Stand up for someone's rights today!"
2017	The theme for 2017 is "Let's stand up for equality, justice and human dignity"
2018	The theme for 2018 is "stand up for the human rights"
2019	Civil Human Rights Front organised a rally in Hong Kong on the Sunday, 8 December to mark the Human Rights Day two days away. The organiser estimated about 800,000 people took part, while the police had an estimate of 183,000 people. The march started from Victoria Park in Causeway Bay and was the biggest of its kind since the march in mid-August as part of 2019–20 Hong Kong protests movement in 2019. Citizens were calling for their five demands, including an independent inquiry into Police misconduct allegations during the 2019–20 Hong Kong protests that occurred in the city during the past 6 months, and also universal suffrage.
2020	The theme for 2020 is "Recover Better – Stand Up for Human Rights".
2021	The theme for 2021 is "Equality - Reducing inequalities, advancing human rights".
2022	The theme for 2022 is "Dignity, Freedom and Justice for All".
2023	The theme for 2023 is "Freedom, Equality and Justice for All".
2024	The theme for 2024 is "Our Rights, Our Future, Right Now".
2025	The theme for 2025 is "Human Rights, Our Everyday Essentials"

== Date variance ==
In South Africa, Human Rights Day is celebrated on 21 March, in remembrance of the Sharpeville massacre which took place on 21 March 1960. This massacre occurred as a result of protests against the Apartheid regime in South Africa. South African Human Rights Day was declared a national holiday when the ANC was elected as the government with Nelson Mandela as the first democratically elected leader. Parliament's role on this day is to empower the people so that the democratic processes becomes known to all South Africans.

It is celebrated on 11 December in Kiribati.

== See also ==
- HumanLight
- International observance
- International Day in Support of Victims of Torture
- Stalker International Film Festival on Human Rights
- World Humanitarian Day
- World Humanist Day
- United Nations
