= Stephen Baird =

American musician

Stephen Baird is an American singer-songwriter, and member of The Galapagos Mountain Boys. His specialty is adapting and parodying Christmas carols and hymns, replacing their original content with scientific and secular themes and lyrics.

== Biography ==
Stephen Miller Baird was born April 18, 1944, in Chelsea, Massachusetts. He was raised in the Bible Belt before converting to rationalism as a student at Stanford University.

He went on to earn his MD from Stanford in 1971, specialized in research in Leukemias and Lymphoma, and is Professor Emeritus of Clinical Pathology at UCSD's School of Medicine. Dr. Baird is also past Chief of Laboratory Medicine at the San Diego Veterans Administration Medical Center. Although retired he still teaches a freshman seminar in the Biology department at UCSD and collaborates on prostate cancer stem cell research.

He met his wife, Carol Davidson, when he was 13 in Burbank, CA. They married in 1970 and they have two sons and four grandchildren.

== Career ==
Stephen Baird was forced to play cello as a child, but let that training lapse. He learned to play guitar in the 1980s and began putting medical and scientific concepts to music while teaching medical school classes. His bluegrass style is applied to topics ranging from gravity to sexually transmitted diseases to false gods. He released his first album of self-described "scientific gospel" music in 1998. In 2000, he formed the band The Opossums of Truth with like-minded individuals Dwight Worden, Mike McColm, Ron Jackson and son Daniel Baird. Upon Jackson's untimely death in 2007, the band reformed as The Galapagos Mountain Boys.

First with The Opossums of Truth and now with The Galapagos Mountain Boys, Baird has been a performer at Darwin Day events since 2002, drawing on his stable of tunes on evolution and natural selection.

== Discography ==
Dr. Stephen Baird has released six albums of scientific gospel music:

- Hallelujah! Evolution! (1998)
- Ain't Gonna Be No Judgment Day (2002)
- Water On Mars (2003)
- Breakin' the Rules (2004)
- Darwin, Darn It! (2009)
- And For THIS You Expect A PhD?! (2009)
