= International Week of the Deaf =

September observance

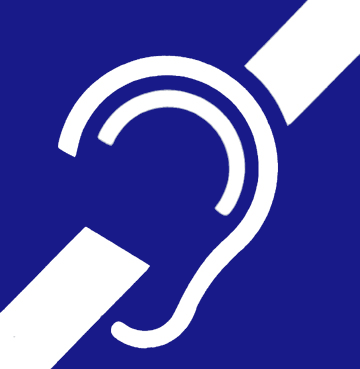
- International Symbol for Deafness
- Also called: IWDeaf
- Observed by: Worldwide
- Duration: 1 week
- Frequency: annual
- Related to: International Day of Sign Languages (IDSL)

International Week of the Deaf (IWDeaf) is celebrated annually across the world during the last full week of September since 2009. In 2018, it was celebrated together with the official International Day of Sign Languages, declared by the United Nations (UN), for the first time. The World Federation of the Deaf (WFD), its national associations, and their affiliates all over the world observe International Week of the Deaf from Monday through Sunday, culminating in International Day of the Deaf on the final Sunday of the week.

In order to commemorate International Week of the Deaf, the WFD invites its national associations and their affiliates to center their celebrations on the theme of Human Rights through Sign Languages. With this emphasis, deaf culture and the accomplishments of deaf people are highlighted more and are positively portrayed. This emphasis fosters better deaf people's rights advocacy activities and strengthens the bonds of solidarity between deaf people and those who support them.

International Week of the Deaf is observed year-round in the United States, not just the last full week in September. For instance, the NAD participated in the Midwest DeaFest, which four state associations of the deaf jointly sponsored in August 2009. In celebration of the births of Thomas Hopkins Gallaudet (December 10, 1787) and Laurent Clerc (December 26, 1785) respectively, a library may host an exhibit in December. Affiliate organizations or other groups may also have Deaf Festivals on a specific day or month (such as April).

Previous events held in the United States include performances by performing artists, seminars, exhibitions of art, film festivals, historical displays, Deaf Festivals, booths in nearby malls, and cultural activities held in conjunction with sporting events.

== Themes ==
Year	Theme	Published date
2026	Declaring Deaf People's Human Rights	
2025	No Human Rights Without Sign Language Rights	
2024	Sign up for Sign Language Rights	
2023	A World Where Deaf People Everywhere Can Sign Anywhere!	
2022	Building Inclusive Communities for All	
2021	Celebrating Thriving Deaf Communities	
2020	Reaffirming Deaf People’s Human Rights	
2019	Sign Language Rights for All!	September 23, 2019
2018	With Sign Language, Everyone is Included!	March 16, 2018
2017	Full Inclusion with Sign Language!	
2016	With Sign Language, I am Equal.	
2015	With Sign Language Rights, Our Children Can!	
2014	Strengthening Human Diversity	
2013	Equality for Deaf People	
2012	Sign Bilingualism is a Human Right!	
2011	Accessibility to Information and Communication	
2010	Deaf Education	
2009	Deaf People’s Cultural Achievements	

== See also ==
- National Day of the Deaf - Brazilian observance on September 26
- International Day of Deafblindness - UN observance on June 27
