= International Day of Deafblindness =

UN observance day

The International Day of Deafblindness is an international day that takes place annually on 27 June. The day was officially recognized by the United Nations in 2025 by Resolution A/RES/79/294. Its main goal is to raise awareness about the realities faced by people with deafblindness. Its creation was advocated for by the World Federation of the Deafblind (WFDB).

On every anniversary, deafblind people from all over the world share their own realities and experiences through videos and events.

== See also ==
- International Week of the Deaf
