= Michael Zimmerman =

Michael Zimmerman may refer to:

- Michael Zimmerman (biologist) (born 1953), American biologist at Butler University
- Michael Zimmerman (historian) (1951–2007), German historian
- Michael Zimmerman (jurist and Buddhist teacher) (born 1943), Zen teacher and former Utah Supreme Court Chief Justice
- Michael Zimmerman (tennis) (born 1970), American tennis player
- Michael E. Zimmerman (born 1946), philosopher at the University of Colorado at Boulder
