= Michael Zimmerman (biologist) =

American biologist

See Michael Zimmerman for other people by this name.

Michael Zimmerman (born 1953) is an American biologist and former Vice President for Academic Affairs / Provost at The Evergreen State College in Olympia, Washington. He previously served in a number of academic and administrative positions including Dean of the College of Liberal Arts and Sciences at Butler University in Indianapolis, Indiana, and Dean of the College of Letters and Science at the University of Wisconsin–Oshkosh for 14 years. Before moving to Wisconsin, Zimmerman spent 12 years at Oberlin College as a professor of biology and associate dean of the College of Arts and Sciences. Prior to that he worked at the College of William & Mary as well as Hampshire College.

Zimmerman holds an A.B. degree in Geography from the University of Chicago and a Ph.D. in Evolutionary Biology and Ecology from Washington University in St. Louis.

Zimmerman has worked mostly on plant-animal interactions, in particular when associated with pollination, and has been elected a fellow of the American Association for the Advancement of Science. He has an interest in science literacy in general, and, more specifically, in the creation–evolution controversy, and organized the Clergy Letter Project and Evolution Sunday. The latter was dramatically expanded and renamed Evolution Weekend in 2008. He is a regular contributor to The Huffington Post and he is represented as a speaker by Ovation Agency, Inc. In 2007, he was awarded a Friend of Darwin award by the National Center for Science Education.

Michael Zimmerman has written one general book, Science, Nonscience, and Nonsense: Approaching Environmental Literacy, published by Johns Hopkins University Press.

== Books ==
- Zimmerman, Michael (1995). Science, Nonscience, and Nonsense: Approaching Environmental Literacy. Baltimore, MD: Johns Hopkins University Press. ISBN 0-801-85090-8. LCCN 95005006. OCLC 31901503.
