= Clergy Letter Project =

Project in support of evolution

- Formation: 2004
- Founder: Michael Zimmerman
- Type: Project
- Purpose: To support of the teaching of evolution
- Region served: United States
- Methods: Collects signatures in support of letters from American Christian, Jewish, Unitarian Universalist, and Buddhist clergy
- Official language: English, Spanish, Portuguese, and French
- Website: www.theclergyletterproject.org

The Clergy Letter Project is a project that maintains statements in support of the teaching of evolution and collects signatures in support of letters from American Christian, Jewish, Unitarian Universalist, Buddhist, and Humanist clergy. The letters make reference to points raised by intelligent design proponents. There are five separate letters: A Christian Clergy Letter, a Rabbi Letter, a Unitarian Universalist Clergy Letter, a Buddhist Clergy Letter, and a Humanist Clergy Letter. As of October, 2022, there were 15,679 signatures from Christian clergy, 839 signatures from Jewish rabbis, 688 signatures from Unitarian Universalist clergy, 75 signatures from Buddhist clergy, and 58 signatures from Humanist clergy.

This effort was initiated in 2004 by the biologist Michael Zimmerman, past vice president for academic affairs and provost at Evergreen State College in Olympia, Washington. The letter was written by John McFadden, pastor of the First Congregational United Church of Christ in Appleton, Wisconsin.

The project also encourages congregations to participate in Religion and Science Weekend by sponsoring events in which clergy and congregations are encouraged to learn about and discuss the positive intersections of religion and science. The weekend chosen is the closest Sunday to Charles Darwin's birthday, February 12. Evolution Sunday events first took place in 2006 and the project changed from "Sunday" to "Weekend" in 2008 to be more inclusive, and in 2022 changed Evolution to Religion and Science. The Clergy Letter Project states that Religion and Science Weekend activities are "an opportunity for serious discussion and reflection on the relationship between religion and science" and in an effort "to elevate the quality of the discussion on this critical topic, and to show that religion and science are not adversaries." The project states that events are specifically intended to emphasize that "Religious people from many diverse faith traditions and locations around the world understand that evolution is quite simply sound science; and for them, it does not in any way threaten, demean, or diminish their faith in God. In fact, for many, the wonders of science often enhance and deepen their awe and gratitude towards God."

== Statement ==
The letters are entitled An Open Letter Concerning Religion and Science. The four letters have somewhat distinct texts.

The Clergy Letter - from American Christian Clergy – An Open Letter Concerning Religion and Science

Within the community of Christian believers there are areas of dispute and disagreement, including the proper way to interpret Holy Scripture. While virtually all Christians take the Bible seriously and hold it to be authoritative in matters of faith and practice, the overwhelming majority do not read the Bible literally, as they would a science textbook. Many of the beloved stories found in the Bible – the Creation, Adam and Eve, Noah and the ark – convey timeless truths about God, human beings, and the proper relationship between Creator and creation expressed in the only form capable of transmitting these truths from generation to generation. Religious truth is of a different order from scientific truth. Its purpose is not to convey scientific information but to transform hearts.

We the undersigned, Christian clergy from many different traditions, believe that the timeless truths of the Bible and the discoveries of modern science may comfortably coexist. We believe that the theory of evolution is a foundational scientific truth, one that has stood up to rigorous scrutiny and upon which much of human knowledge and achievement rests. To reject this truth or to treat it as "one theory among others" is to deliberately embrace scientific ignorance and transmit such ignorance to our children. We believe that among God's good gifts are human minds capable of critical thought and that the failure to fully employ this gift is a rejection of the will of our Creator. To argue that God's loving plan of salvation for humanity precludes the full employment of the God-given faculty of reason is to attempt to limit God, an act of hubris. We urge school board members to preserve the integrity of the science curriculum by affirming the teaching of the theory of evolution as a core component of human knowledge. We ask that science remain science and that religion remain religion, two very different, but complementary, forms of truth.

In addition to English, the Christian version of the project has also been translated to Spanish, Portuguese, and French.

Rabbi Letter

The Clergy Letter - from American Rabbis – An Open Letter Concerning Religion and Science

As rabbis from various branches of Judaism, we the undersigned, urge public school boards to affirm their commitment to the teaching of the science of evolution. Fundamentalists of various traditions, who perceive the science of evolution to be in conflict with their personal religious beliefs, are seeking to influence public school boards to authorize the teaching of creationism. We see this as a breach in the separation of church and state. Those who believe in a literal interpretation of the Biblical account of creation are free to teach their perspective in their homes, religious institutions and parochial schools. To teach it in the public schools would be to assert a particular religious perspective in an environment which is supposed to be free of such indoctrination.

The Bible is the primary source of spiritual inspiration and of values for us and for many others, though not everyone, in our society. It is, however, open to interpretation, with some taking the creation account and other content literally and some preferring a figurative understanding. It is possible to be inspired by the religious teachings of the Bible while not taking a literalist approach and while accepting the validity of science including the foundational concept of evolution. It is not the role of public schools to indoctrinate students with specific religious beliefs but rather to educate them in the established principles of science and in other subjects of general knowledge.

Unitarian Universalist Letter

The Clergy Letter - from Unitarian Universalist Clergy – An Open Letter Concerning Religion and Science

As Unitarian Universalists, we draw from many sources, including "Wisdom from the world's religions which inspires us in our ethical and spiritual life," and "Humanist teachings which counsel us to heed the guidance of reason and the results of science, and warn us against idolatries of the mind and spirit." While most Unitarian Universalists believe that many sacred scriptures convey timeless truths about humans and our relationship to the sacred, we stand in solidarity with our Christian and Jewish brothers and sisters who do not read the Bible literally, as they would a science textbook. We believe that religious truth is of a different order from scientific truth. Its purpose is not to convey scientific information but to transform hearts.

Fundamentalists of various traditions, who perceive the science of evolution to be in conflict with their personal religious beliefs, are seeking to influence public school boards to authorize the teaching of creationism. We see this as a breach in the separation of church and state. Those who believe in a literal interpretation of the Biblical account of creation are free to teach their perspective in their homes, religious institutions and parochial schools. To teach it in the public schools would be to assert a particular religious perspective in an environment which is supposed to be free of such indoctrination.

We the undersigned, Unitarian Universalist clergy, believe that the timeless truths of the Bible and other scriptures may comfortably coexist with the discoveries of modern science. We believe that the theory of evolution is a foundational scientific truth, one that has stood up to rigorous scrutiny and upon which much of human knowledge and achievement rests. To reject this truth or to treat it as "one theory among others" is to deliberately embrace scientific ignorance and transmit such ignorance to our children. We urge school board members to preserve the integrity of the science curriculum by affirming the teaching of the theory of evolution as a core component of human knowledge. We ask that science remain science and that religion remain religion, two very different, but complementary, forms of truth.

Buddhist Clergy Letter

The Clergy Letter - from American Buddhist Clergy – An Open Letter Concerning Religion and Science

"If scientific analysis were conclusively to demonstrate certain claims in Buddhism to be false, then we must accept the findings of science and abandon those claims or adopt them as metaphor."

The Universe in a Single Atom

Tenzin Gyatso - The Dalai Lama

As the above quote indicates, the Buddhist tradition is primarily a rational religion. The earliest Buddhist teachings are intended to help all sentient beings to live a life of integrity in harmony with reality. While the specific science of evolution is not explicitly taught in our faith, it is implicit in the core teaching of interdependent origination, which demonstrates that all things are interconnected and contingent upon one another for their form and development. Likewise, a creator deity is not relied upon for a creation story. The ancient Indian fables of the Buddha’s various incarnations from animal to human are readily understood not as a literal history but as metaphor describing the evolving nature of life. In fact, the concept of Buddha itself is best understood as a symbol for humanity’s evolutionary potential. For all of these reasons, we admonish public school boards to affirm their commitment to teaching the science of evolution. We understand the role of public schools is to educate students in the established principles of science and in other subjects of general knowledge.

Humanist Clergy Letter

The Clergy Letter - from American Humanist Clergy – An Open Letter Concerning Religion and Science

As Humanists, we have adopted a lifestance that is guided by reason, inspired by compassion, and informed by experience. Humanism is not anti-religious. It embraces a progressive philosophy which affirms our ability and responsibility to lead ethical lives of personal fulfillment that aspire to the greater good of humanity. Humanist clergy serve a growing number of individuals who variously identify as Humanists, agnostics, non-religious, and atheists, and their allies, by providing leadership, moral guidance, rites of passage, and life celebration services in a similar fashion to the clergies of other traditions.

Fundamentalists of various religions who perceive the science of evolution to be in conflict with their sectarian beliefs are seeking to influence public education authorities to require or authorize the teaching of creationism or to deprecate the teaching of evolution. We see this as a breach of the separation of church and state. Those who believe in a literal interpretation of the biblical or other religious accounts of creation are free to teach their perspectives in their homes, religious institutions, and private religious schools. But to teach creationism in its various forms, or to compromise the teaching of evolution to placate religious sensibilities, in the public schools would be to assert a particular religious perspective in an environment which is supposed to be free of such indoctrination.

We, the undersigned Humanist clergy, stand in agreement with the global scientific community that the evidence of cosmological, geological, and biological evolution is overwhelming. This consensus is in no way particular to Humanism, and we stand in solidarity with our colleagues of the Christian, Jewish, Unitarian Universalist, Muslim, and Buddhist faiths who have also embraced evolution as a vital scientific concept essential to public science education curricula. Teaching evolution in a public science classroom is no more an endorsement of Humanism than it would be of any of these otherwise disparate religious orientations..

We believe that evolution is a foundational scientific truth, one that has stood up to rigorous scrutiny and upon which much of human knowledge and achievement rests. Omitting evolution from science teaching, or treating it dismissively as “only a theory,” miscommunicates its centrality in modern biology and threatens students’ understanding of the very nature of science. Along with our religious allies of other traditions, we ask that science remain science and that religion remain religion. We urge public education authorities to preserve the integrity of the science curriculum by affirming the teaching of evolutionary theory as a core component of human knowledge.

== History ==
The project was organized in 2004 by Michael Zimmerman, then a biology professor and dean of the College of Science and Letters at University of Wisconsin–Oshkosh. He was motivated to create a petition by the actions of the school board in Grantsburg, Wisconsin, which had passed some anti-evolution policies in the summer of 2004. Zimmerman was a veteran of similar disputes in Ohio, when he was a professor at Oberlin College. After Zimmerman watched Christian fundamentalist clergy from Dover, Pennsylvania, on the television program Nightline insisting that decisions about teaching evolution in schools was equivalent to a choice between heaven and hell, he recruited the husband of the head of the university Psychology Department, John McFadden, pastor of the First Congregational United Church of Christ in Appleton, Wisconsin, to write a letter describing how science and religion can co-exist.

Zimmerman worked with local clergy in Wisconsin to get clergy to sign this letter, and within a few weeks he had collected almost 200 clergy signatures. The signed letter was delivered to the Grantsburg School Board on December 16, 2004. This effort, together with those of other concerned groups of educators, citizens and scientists, lead the Grantsburg School Board to rescind its policies.

After this success, Zimmerman was encouraged to organize a nationwide campaign and gather more signatures. By September 12, 2005, the Clergy Letter Project had collected more than 7,500 signatures. By the beginning of December 2005, the project had amassed more than 10,000 signatures. Most of the clergy who signed are Protestant, an artifact of the way that people were originally invited to sign the letter. Email invitations were sent; it was easier to get email addresses for some churches and denominations than others.

The clergy letter was at first limited to Christian clergy, and Zimmerman declined offers from Jewish and Muslim clergy. Zimmerman stated that "Since it is fundamentalist Christian ministers who have been shouting to the American people that they must choose between religion and science, it seemed reasonable to have thousands upon thousands of Christian clergy assert otherwise. It simply wouldn't be very persuasive to have leaders of other religions saying to Christians that Christian fundamentalist ministers are not speaking for all Christians...the Clergy Letter Project and Evolution Sunday are not designed to change the minds of fundamentalists. Rather, our goal is to educate the vast majority of Christians who, if told they have to choose between religion and modern science, are likely to opt for religion."

More recently, four additional statements have been added to the project: a Jewish rabbi letter, a Unitarian Universalist clergy letter, a Buddhist clergy letter, and a Humanist clergy letter.

== Evolution Weekend and related activities ==
Zimmerman and the Clergy Letter Project also organize "Evolution Weekend," an annual movement to encourages churches to discuss the role of science and religion in sermons, discussion groups, seminars, and other activities on the weekend nearest to February 12, the birthday of Charles Darwin (Darwin Day). The day began in 2006 as "Evolution Sunday," gaining attention from The New York Times. In 2008, it was renamed "Evolution Weekend" to incorporate more faith traditions. In 2011, 652 congregations from all 50 states and the District of Columbia as well as 13 countries participated in Evolution Weekend activities.

Zimmerman and the Clergy Letter Project maintain a list of 1,052 scientists from all 50 states, the District of Columbia, Puerto Rico, and 32 countries, who have agreed to serve as "technical consultants to clergy members who have questions about the science associated with all aspects of evolution." The project states that "The very existence of this list clearly demonstrates the willingness of scientists to work collaboratively with clergy members. Together, scientists and clergy members demonstrate that religion and science can have a complementary and positive relationship with one another."

Evolution Weekend often gained attention from several news outlets, with participating clergy being interviewed in local publications.

== Reaction from creationists ==
The creationist Discovery Institute, which arranged its own anti-evolution petition called A Scientific Dissent from Darwinism in 2001 criticized the project. Discovery Institute communications director Rob Crowther asserted that the disputes about evolution was "purely a scientific debate" and that clergy petitions are irrelevant, stating that clergy "don't make any difference," since "We don't think there is anything religious at all to the theory of intelligent design." Zimmerman described this argument as part of the problem, as intelligent design tried to undermine science by changing it from a study of the natural world to include supernatural explanations, and it was important for clergy to defend science against these attacks.

Ken Ham and Mark Looy of the creationist organization Answers in Genesis have repeatedly condemned Evolution Sunday/Evolution Weekend activities as a "Darwin praise service" and expressing dismay that "over 10,200 clergy had signed this awful letter." Ham and Looy also criticized Zimmerman's fundraising efforts through the Christian Alliance for Progress. Answers in Genesis published a list of "modern scientists who have accepted the biblical account of creation." The majority are not biologists. The group has also organized "Creation Sunday" in response to Evolution Weekend, and has promoted the Creation Letter Project in response to Clergy Letter Project.

Jonathan Dudley, a divinity student at Yale University and author of the book Broken Words: The Abuse of Science and Faith in American Politics (2011), wrote approvingly of Evolution Sunday in the Yale Daily News on January 24, 2007, while still worrying that congregations were not being taught to think for themselves with this current campaign, any more than subscribing to fundamentalist Christian Biblical literalist doctrines. This caused Discovery Institute fellow Jonathon Wells to write a scathing article in the Yale Daily News about Evolution Sunday, "Darwinism," and Zimmerman. Wells repeated creationist objections to evolution by claiming that there is no evidence of evolution and condemning evolution for not being in agreement with the views of 40% of the American public. Zimmerman responded to Wells' attack with a column in the Yale Daily News pointing out the copious errors of fact in Wells' article. Wells followed this with a letter to the editor in the Yale Daily News. Wells brushed over the points Zimmerman had raised, and focused on whether the word "Darwinism" is appropriate or not. Wells also responded with vigor to two others who had written letters to the editor critical of his original article. Finally, Wells claimed that the only reason to stage Evolution Sunday is because evolution is not "scientifically sound or religiously neutral," and that it is "promoting an anti-religious philosophy disguised as empirical science." University of Iowa faculty member Tara C. Smith noted several other responses to this episode in her blog, Aetiology.

== See also ==
- A Scientific Support for Darwinism
- Creation and evolution in public education in the United States
- Creation–evolution controversy
- Level of support for evolution
- Project Steve
- Theistic evolution
