= HumanLight =

Humanist holiday

- Official HumanLight Symbol used in HumanLight celebrations
- Observed by: United States and some other countries
- Type: Cultural or religious
- Significance: Provides humanists and secular people with an opportunity to commemorate the December holiday season.
- Celebrations: Reason; Compassion; Hope; Humanity
- Date: December 23
- First time: December 23, 2001
- Related to: Humanism

HumanLight is a Humanist holiday celebrated annually on December 23. HumanLight was first celebrated in 2001, and was created to provide a specifically Humanist celebration during the western world's holiday season. The New Jersey Humanist Network founded the holiday in 2001 to aid secular people in commemorating the December holiday season without encroaching on other adjacent events—both religious ones such as Christmas and secular ones such as Solstice. The inaugural event involved only the founding organization, but is now celebrated by many secular organizations and individuals across the United States and other countries. Various organizations have recognized the holiday, including the American Humanist Association in 2004. The HumanLight Committee maintains the official HumanLight webpage and engages with humanist organizations and the media about the holiday.

HumanLight is a secular holiday that focuses on the "positive, secular human values of reason, compassion, humanity and hope". While there are no universally accepted ways to commemorate the holiday, modern celebrations typically involve a communal meal among a family or group. The use of candles to symbolize reason, hope, compassion, and humanity has become widespread among those celebrating. Groups today also observe the holiday using charity work, gift exchanges, and other ideas associated with holidays and celebrations.

== Etymology and meaning ==
The name HumanLight comes from a non-supernatural emphasis on humanity with "Light" pointing to human reason. The event is designed to celebrate the "positive human values of reason, compassion, humanity and hope".

== Origins and history ==
HumanLight's origins stem from members of the New Jersey Humanist Network asking in the late 1990s how secular people could best participate in the December holiday season. The inaugural event occurred at the Verona Park Boathouse in Verona, New Jersey on December 23, 2001, and was attended by nearly 100 people, including prominent Humanist Paul Kurtz.

Celebration of the holiday has expanded since its inaugural event. By 2010, there were at least thirty known public celebrations, and multiple secular organizations—including the American Humanist Association—had endorsed the holiday. The ceremonies themselves have also evolved. The first event involved a meal among its participants, along with artistic performances and other activities. Over the years, additional traditions have been added.

The December 23 date allows HumanLight to connect itself to the December holiday season without interfering with other winter holidays which many Humanists may also celebrate, such as Christmas. This was by design, as Patrick Colucci of the HumanLight Committee has stated that "We're not out to take Christmas away from anyone who wants to celebrate it."

== Symbols ==
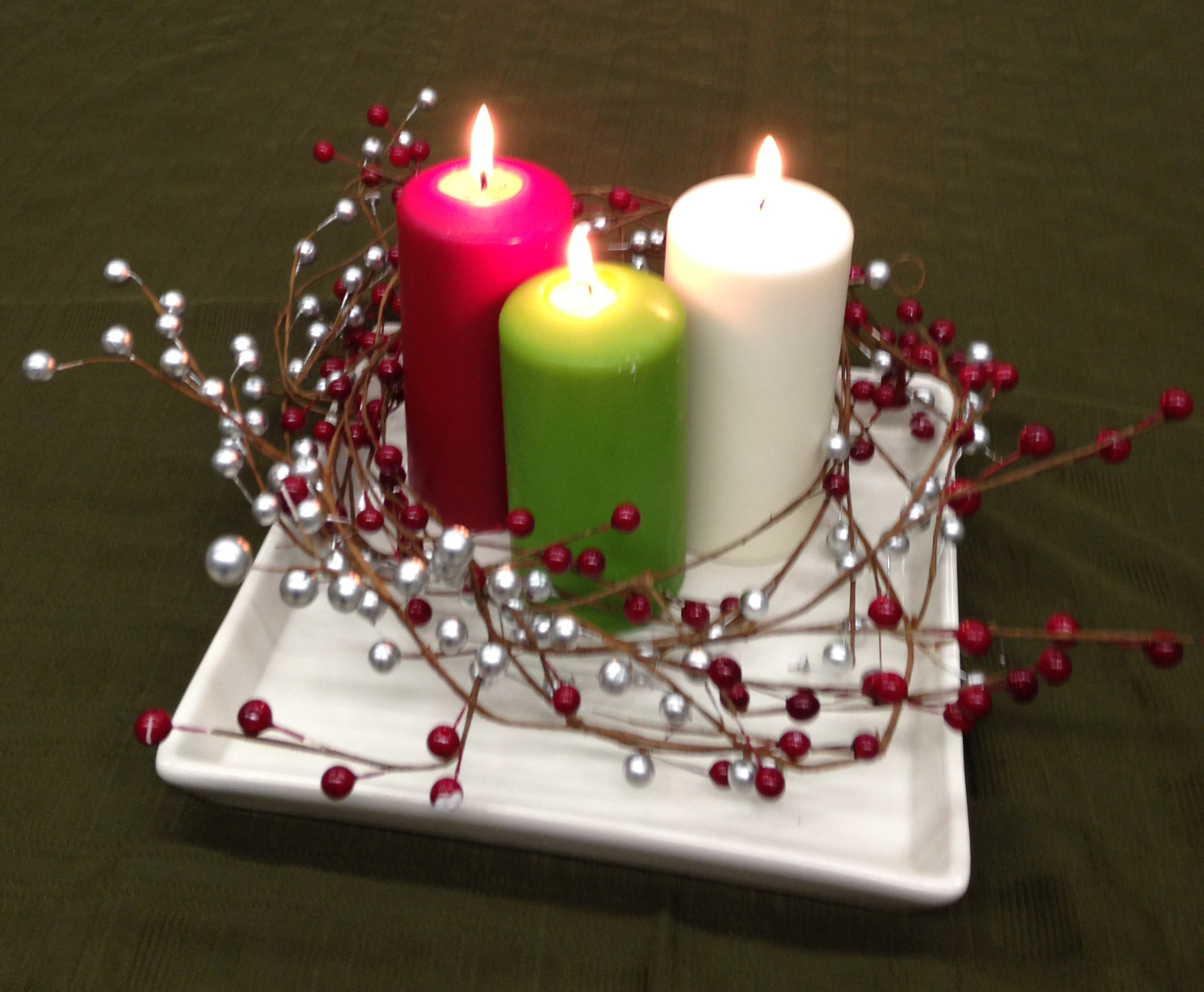
Candle display following a Candle Lighting ceremony during a HumanLight celebration in Germany in 2014

The HumanLight symbol was designed by a volunteer artist; the initial symbol appeared with a single figure, but was adjusted to include three figures in 2009 to reflect the "community nature" of the holiday. The current symbol "depicts the light of the sun, and human figures celebrating with arms outstretched. The font characters composing HumanLight are of a festive, decorative nature."

There are no universal traditions, but over time the use of candles has become significant. Candles and decorations have at times used the colors blue, red, and yellow/gold, to represent both the colors of the HumanLight symbol as well as reason, compassion, and hope. There are no set colors for candle-lighting ceremonies, and both three and four candle ceremonies have been seen, with a fourth candle representing humanity.

== Observance ==
Although the first HumanLight celebration was with a large group at a public location, HumanLight is also celebrated as families or individuals, and can be in public or private venues, such as homes. There are no firm requirements for HumanLight celebrations. Even the date of celebration is flexible. For example, although HumanLight Day is December 23, if that date in a particular year falls on a weekday, organizers can schedule the celebration on the previous weekend, if needed.

Although there are no requirements, there are a wide variety of possible themes and events to include in a HumanLight ceremony or celebration. These include "science book exchanges," music, and children's activities, among others. Charitable works and donations are also common parts of HumanLight celebrations. Private events at home tend to involve more disparate activities, but frequently involve a meal with family and friends. The HumanLight Committee recommends keeping three principles central in any event: (1) promoting the positive values of Humanism, (2) avoiding negative messages related to religions, and (3) keeping it family and children-friendly.

== See also ==
- List of multinational festivals and holidays
- Religious humanism
- World Humanist Day
