= List of schools in the Roman Catholic Diocese of Fall River =

List of schools in the Roman Catholic Diocese of Fall River.

== 5-12 schools ==
- Saint Pope John Paul II High School (9-12) and St. Francis Xavier Preparatory School (5-8) (Hyannis) - Merged into a single administration in 2013.

== High schools ==
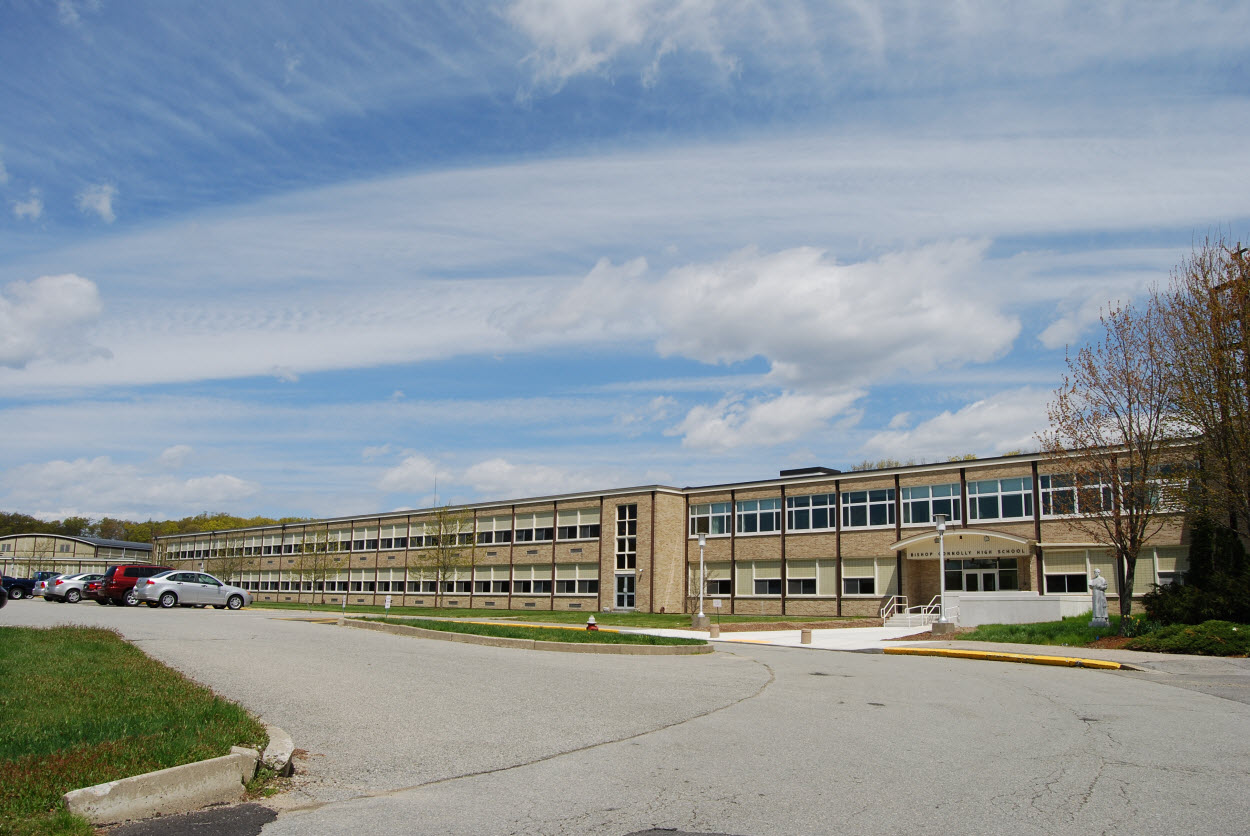
Bishop Connolly High School

- Bishop Connolly High School (Fall River)
- Bishop Stang High School (Dartmouth)
- Bishop Feehan High School (Attleboro)

== Elementary schools ==
- St. Francis Xavier School (Acushnet)
- St. John the Evangelist School (Attleboro)
- St. Joseph School (Fairhaven) - Formerly St. Joseph-St. Therese School
- Espirito Santo School (Fall River) - Espirito Santo School opened on September 19, 1910, and was the first Portuguese grammar school to open in the United States. As of 2011 the majority of the students are ethnic Portuguese, and 70% of the students are bilingual.
- Holy Name School (Fall River)
- Holy 67 School (Fall River)
- Holy Trinity School (Fall River)
- St. Michael School (Fall River)
- St. Stanislaus School (Fall River)
- St. Mary School (Mansfield)
- All Saints Catholic School (New Bedford) - It was a merger of the St. Mary and St. Joseph-Therese schools, while using the St. Mary Campus, and formed in 2010.
- Holy Family-Holy Name School (New Bedford)
- St. James St. John School (New Bedford)
- St. Mary-Sacred Heart School (North Attleboro)
- St. Pius X School (South Yarmouth)
- Our Lady of Lourdes School (Taunton) - Located in the Weir Village neighborhood, it opened in 1963. It was previously a K-5, and then PK-5 school. It became a Pre-Kindergarten through grade 4 school when St. Mary's Primary closed in 2018; the 5th grade was given to Coyle and Cassidy School. In 2020 it became a PK-8 school; as Coyle and Cassidy closed, Our Lady of Lourdes took the middle school grades.

== Former schools ==
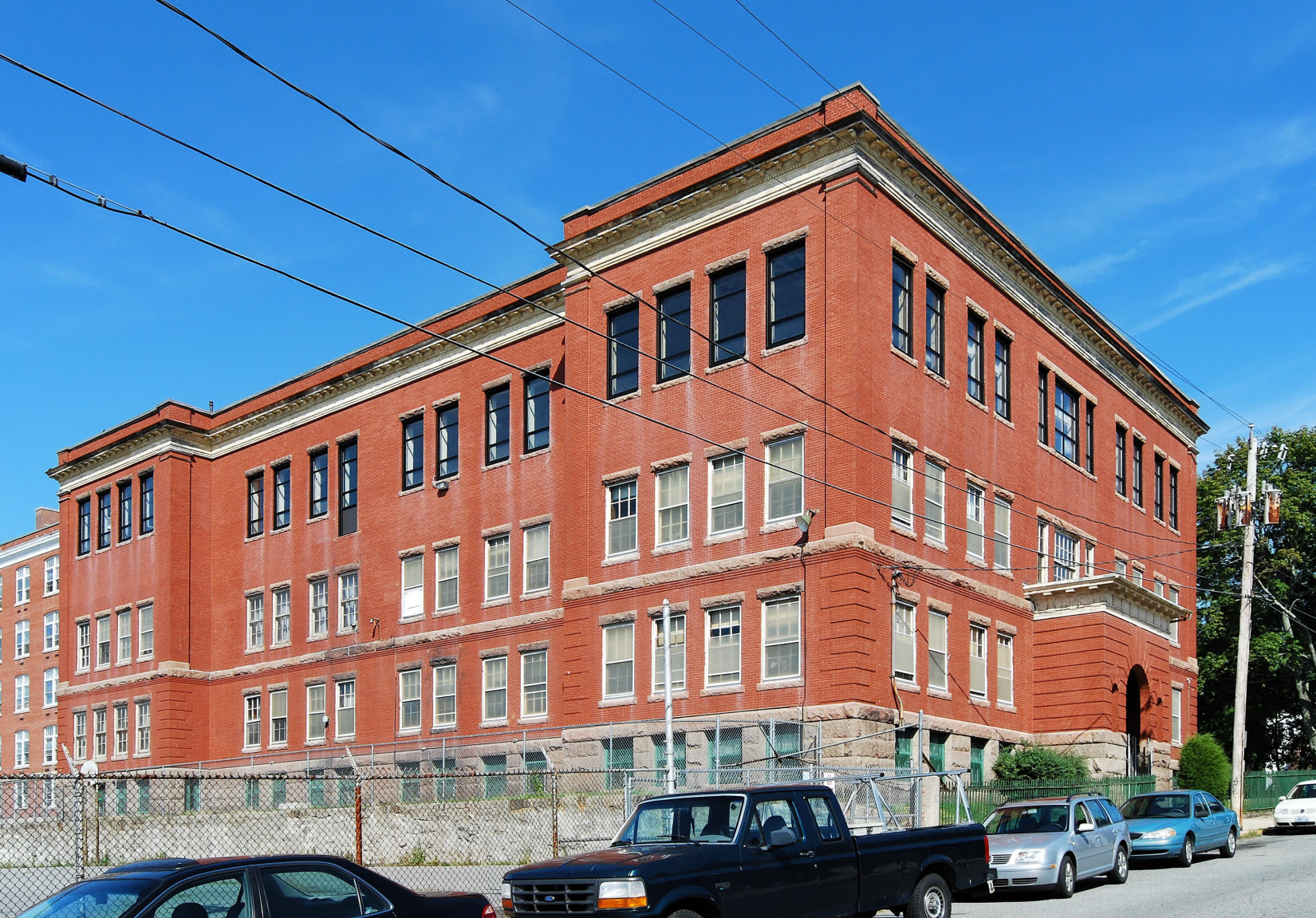
Notre Dame School

K-12 schools

- St. Vincent's Residential/Special Education Treatment Center (Fall River) - It served as the on-site school, serving K-12, for the St. Vincent's Home. Its average enrollment was 120. The school was dismantled after the State of Massachusetts introduced the Children's Behavioral Health Initiative (CBHI).

Secondary (middle and high)

- Coyle and Cassidy School (Taunton) - Merged into Bishop Connolly in 2020 in the wake of the COVID-19 pandemic, with Our Lady of Lourdes School in Taunton taking the middle school students.
- Taunton Catholic Middle School (TCMS) (Taunton) - The building opened in 1932. The school merged into Coyle and Cassidy in 2014. Bristol Community College moved into the ex-TCMS campus that year. Stefan Swaintek of The Taunton Daily Gazette wrote in 2014 that "The closing of Taunton Catholic Middle School is drawing some mixed feelings from former students."

Primary

- St. Margaret Primary School (Buzzards Bay) - It closed in 2020 in the wake of the COVID-19 pandemic. Schools taking former St. Margaret's students include St. Francis Xavier, St. Joseph, and St. Pius X.
- Notre Dame School (Fall River) - Located in the Flint neighborhood, it opened in 1876 and closed in 2008.
- St. Anne School (Fall River)
- St. Jean Baptiste School (Fall River)
- SS. Peter & Paul School (Fall River) - It opened circa 1923 In the 2011–2012 school year it had 172 students, and this declined to 111, or 112, in the 2012–2013 school year. The school tried to combine grade levels and allow self-paced advancement through the "mastery level" format, and accordingly did not require as many teachers. The students were grouped into: early years, primary, intermediate and middle. Kathleen Burt, the principal, stated that this did not attract new students even though it benefited those already at the school. 79 students were registered as students for the 2013–2014 school year, which did not happen, by the March 1, 2013 deadline. The school closed in 2013.
- Our Lady of Mt. Carmel School (New Bedford) - It opened with grades 1–3 in 1941, with additional levels afterwards. In the 1990s it established a preschool; it was a PreK-8 school at the end of its life. It closed in 2007. Joseph Sullivan stated that this was due to the declining enrollment and the increase in expenses. Its final graduating class numbered six.
- St. Anthony School (New Bedford) - It opened in 1896 and closed in 2007.
- St. Joseph-St. Therese School (New Bedford) - It had 225 students in 2000. This declined to 138 in 2005 but went up to 152 in 2010. It merged into all Saints in 2010.
- St. Mary School (New Bedford) - It had 214 students in 2005, which declined to 180 in 2010. It merged into all Saints in 2010.
- St. Mary's Primary School (Taunton) - It opened in 1908. It was previously known as St. Mary's School and St. Mary's Elementary School. Circa 2008 its enrollment was about 266; this fell to 133 in 2018. The school closed that year. Principal Michael O’Brien stated that the state of the physical plant was one factor in the school's closure. The school did not have an elevator. In addition to the physical plant factor, the diocese also no longer wished to cover the school's expenses. In 2018 it was $500,000 in debt for salaries and other items, and it also had a $1.5 million debt for 2006-2014 medical/dental insurance costs.
- Holy Trinity Parish School (West Harwich) - Operated 1965–1971.
- Holy Trinity Regional School (West Harwich) - An independent (non-diocesan) school, was located in the former Holy Trinity Parish School Building. It served Kindergarten through grade 2 upon its September 1994 opening and expanded with one grade level each until it became a full K-8 school. In 2006 it expanded with preschool but it also ended middle school grades. Therefore, it was Pre-Kindergarten through 5 in the end of its life. It faced deepening expenses; from 2007 to 2012 it had budget deficits of about $96,000, with $150,000 of a deficit for the 2011–2012 school year. It closed in 2012.

Preschool

- St. Saviour Day Nursery (New Bedford)
- Villa Fatima Pre School (Taunton)
