= James Louis Connolly =

American prelate (1894–1986)

His Excellency, The Most Reverend James Louis Connolly
- Bishop of Fall River; Titular Bishop of Mylasa; Titular Bishop of Thibuzabetum.
- Diocese: Diocese of Fall River
- In office: May 17, 1951 - October 30, 1970
- Predecessor: James Edwin Cassidy
- Successor: Daniel Anthony Cronin

Orders
- Ordination: December 21, 1923 by Daniel Francis Feehan
- Consecration: May 24, 1945 by John Murray

Personal details
- Born: November 15, 1894 Fall River, Massachusetts
- Died: September 12, 1986 (aged 91) Fall River
- Denomination: Roman Catholic
- Education: St. Charles College; The Sulpician Seminary; Catholic University of Leuven
- Motto: Auspice Maria (Under the protection of Mary)

Ordination history of James Louis Connolly
History
Episcopal consecration
- Consecrated by: John Gregory Murray (St. Paul)
Episcopal succession
Bishops consecrated by James Louis Connolly as principal consecrator
- James Joseph Gerrard: March 19, 1959
- Humberto Sousa Medeiros: June 9, 1966

James Louis Connolly (November 15, 1894 – September 12, 1986) was an American prelate of the Roman Catholic Church. He served as bishop of the Diocese of Fall River in Massachusetts from 1951 to 1970.

== Biography ==
=== Early life ===
James Connolly was born on November 15, 1894, in Fall River, Massachusetts, to Francis and Agnes (née McBride) Connolly. After graduating from B.M.C. Durfee High School in Fall River, he studied at St. Charles College in Catonsville, Maryland. Connolly then entered the Sulpician Seminary in Washington, D.C.

=== Priesthood ===
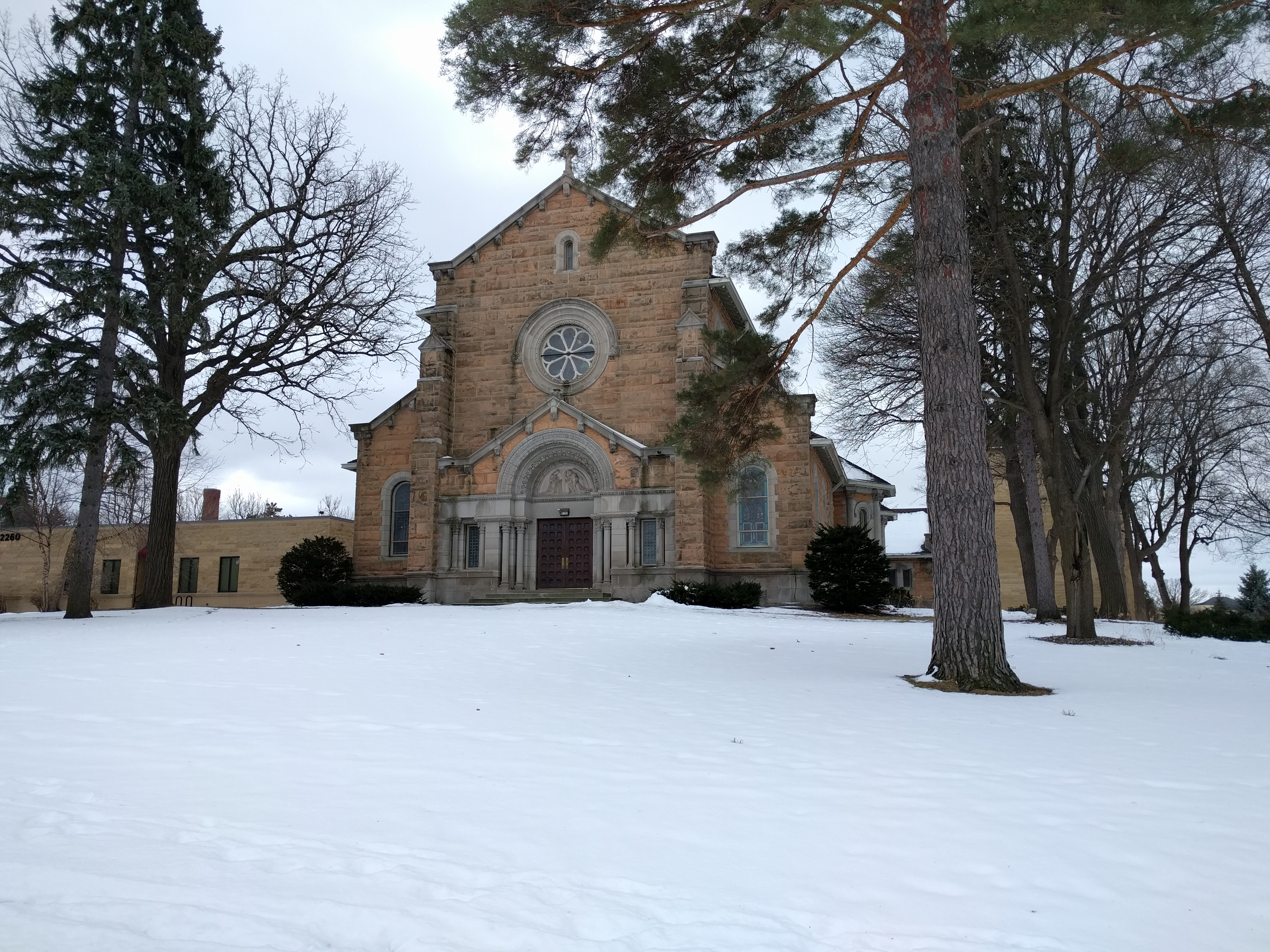
Saint Paul Seminary, St. Paul, Minnesota (2016)

Connolly was ordained to the priesthood by Bishop Daniel Feehan for the Diocese of Providence on December 21, 1923. After his ordination, Connolly served as a curate at Our Lady of Lourdes Parish in Wellfleet, Massachusetts.

In 1924, after being incardinated, or transferred, to the Archdiocese of St. Paul in Minnesota, Connolly entered Catholic University of Leuven in Leuven, Belgium. He earned a doctorate in historical science summa cum laude in 1928. After receiving his doctorate, Connolly traveled to St. Paul, Minnesota, where he served as a professor and then rector of Nazareth Hall Preparatory Seminary in Arden, Hills, Minnesota, from 1940 to 1943 and Saint Paul Seminary in St. Paul from 1943 to 1945.

=== Coadjutor Bishop and Bishop of Fall River ===
On April 7, 1945, Connolly was appointed coadjutor bishop of Fall River and titular bishop of Mylasa by Pope Pius XII. He received his episcopal consecration at the Cathedral of Saint Paul in St. Paul on May 24, 1945, from Archbishop John Murray, with Bishops William O. Brady and Leo Binz serving as co-consecrators. In addition to his episcopal duties, he served as pastor of Sacred Heart Parish from 1945 to 1951. Upon the death of Bishop James Cassidy, Connolly automatically succeeded him as the fourth bishop of Fall River on May 17, 1951.

During his tenure as bishop, Connolly erected 15 new parishes, 17 schools, and 33 churches. He also established the following high schools in the diocese:

- Bishop Stang High School in North Dartmouth
- Bishop Feehan High School in Attleboro
- Bishop Cassidy High School in Taunton
- Bishop Connolly High School in Fall River

Connolly encouraged vocations, ordaining a total of 230 priests (130 for the diocese and 100 for religious communities) during his administration. He founded the diocesan newspaper, The Anchor, in 1957. He attended all four sessions of the Second Vatican Council in Rome between 1962 and 1965.

=== Retirement and legacy ===
On October 30, 1970, Pope Paul VI accepted Connolly's resignation as bishop of Fall River and appointed him titular bishop of Thibuzabetum. He resigned his titular see on December 31, 1970. James Connolly died on September 12, 1986, at St. Anne's Hospital in Fall River, aged 91.

== Works ==
- John Gerson: Reformer and Mystic (1928)

Catholic Church titles
Preceded by James Edwin Cassidy	Bishop of Fall River; 1951 – 1970	Succeeded by Daniel Anthony Cronin
