= Bad Schönborn =

- Municipality
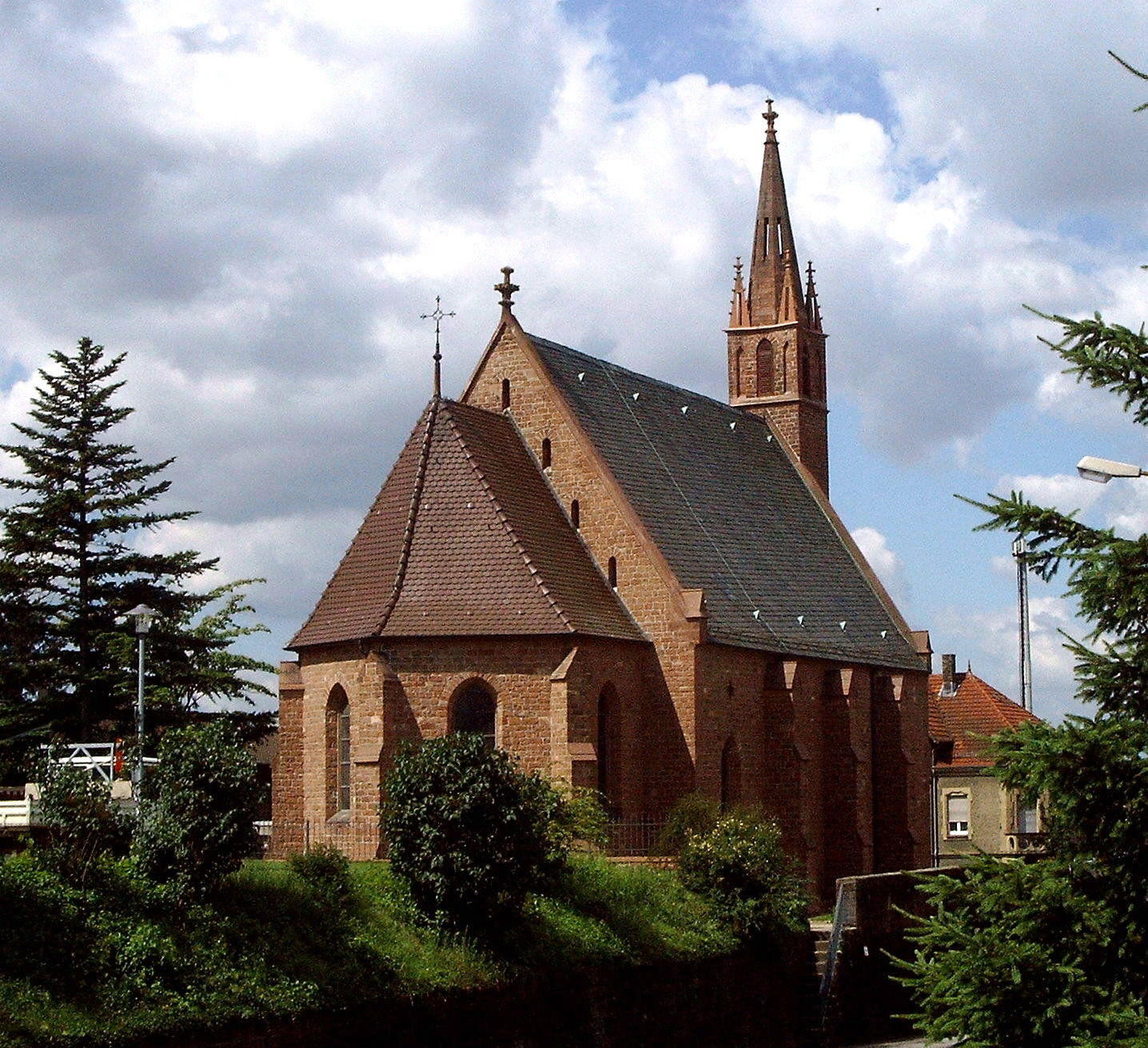
- Church of Saint Roch in Bad Mingolsheim

- Flag Coat of arms

- Location of Bad Schönborn within Karlsruhe district
- Interactive map of Bad Schönborn
- Location within Germany Location within Baden-Württemberg
- Coordinates: 49°12′N 8°39′E
- Country: Germany
- State: Baden-Württemberg
- Admin. region: Karlsruhe
- District: Karlsruhe

Government
  - Mayor (2019–27): Klaus Detlev Huge (SPD)

Area
  - Total: 24.1 km^{2} (9.3 sq mi)
- Elevation: 122 m (400 ft)

Population (2025-12-31)
  - Total: 13,529
  - Density: 561/km^{2} (1,450/sq mi)
- Time zone: UTC+01:00 (CET)
  - Summer (DST): UTC+02:00 (CEST)
- Postal codes: 76669
- Dialling codes: 07253
- Vehicle registration: KA
- Website: www.bad-schoenborn.de

Bad Schönborn (German pronunciation: [baːt ˈʃøːnbɔʁn]) is a municipality in northern Karlsruhe district in Baden-Württemberg, Germany. It is located on the Bertha Benz Memorial Route.

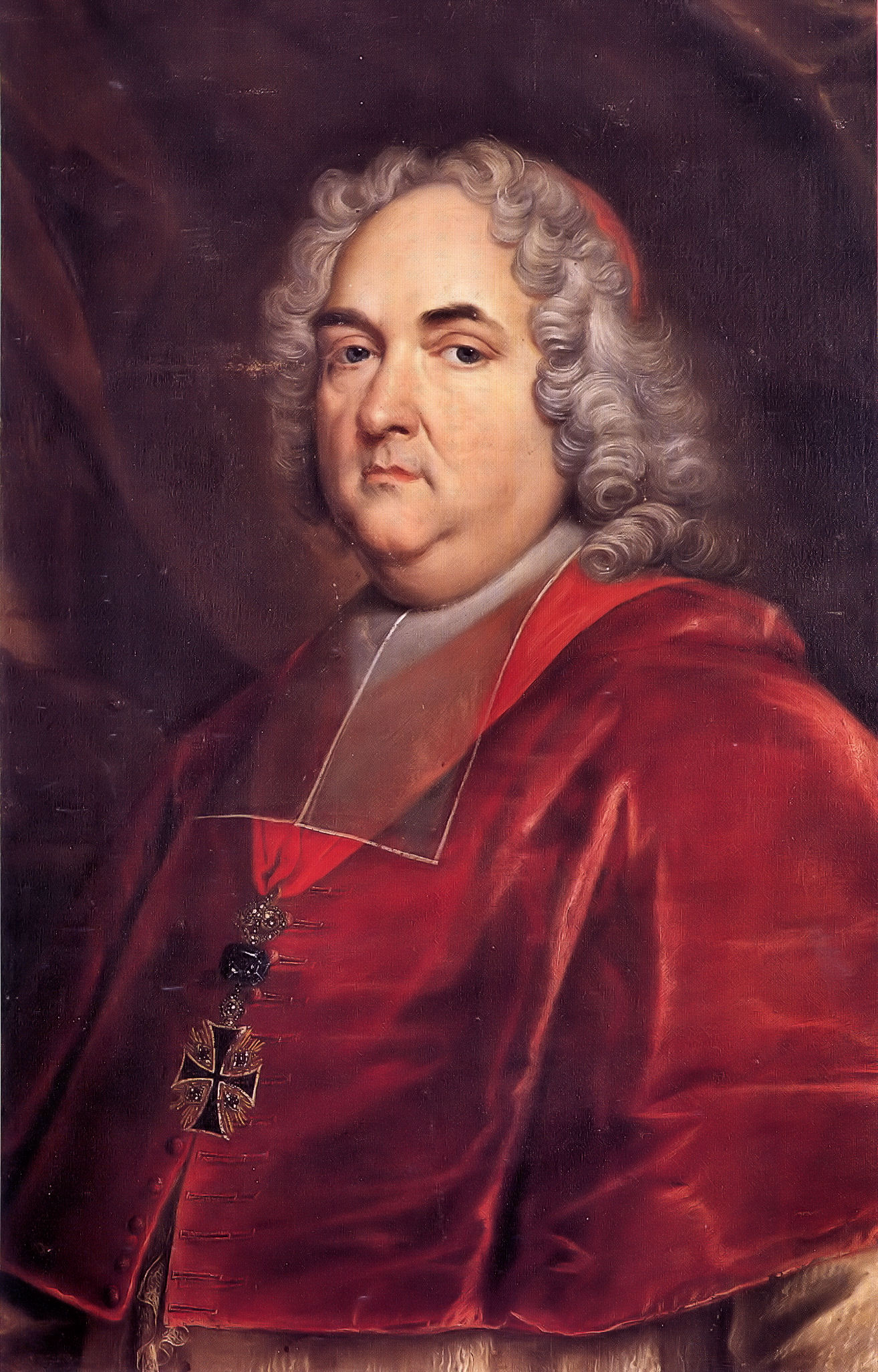
Damian Hugo von Schönborn

In 1971, two previous towns Bad Langenbrücken and Bad Mingolsheim were combined, and the town was named Bad Schönborn after Damian Hugo von Schönborn, archbishop of Speyer (1719–1743), who built Kislau Castle in Bad Mingolsheim.

Bad Schönborn is famous for being a health resort with mineral springs, and this spa offers the largest roofed swimming area in Germany to people with a wide range of diseases, e.g. rheumatism. Bad Schönborn is one of the well-known health resorts in Baden-Württemberg due to its sulfur and thermal water. It has numerous spa and rehabilitation facilities. The development of the St. Lambertus thermal fountain, which the former mayor Willhauck promoted, was a major factor in the upswing of the health resort. Under his successor, Bender, the Thermarium was inaugurated in the current spa area in Mingolsheim in 1975. The most important local clinics and rehabilitation centers are the St. Rochus Clinic in Bad Mingolsheim, the Sigmund-Weil and Gotthard Schettler Clinic, and the Sigel Clinic and the Mikina Clinic in Bad Langenbrücken.

Archbishop Franz Christoph von Hutten founded the sulphur spa in Bad Langenbrücken in 1766.

A famous citizen is the minister of the interior of Baden-Württemberg parliament Heribert Rech.

The Battle of Mingolsheim took place near Mingolsheim during the Thirty Years' War on April 27, 1622.

== Notable People from Bad Schönborn ==
- Peter Luder (1415–1472) a professor of Latin at the University of Heidelberg
- Franz Mone (* 12. May 1796 in Mingolsheim) a historian and archeologist
- Al (Albert) Sieber (* 27. February 1843 in Mingolsheim) Chief of Scouts during the Apache Wars
- William Stang (* 21. April 1854 in Langenbrücken) Bishop of Fall River in Massachusetts], the Bishop Stang High School is named in memory of William Stang.
