= James Gerard =

James Gerard may refer to:

- James W. Gerard (1867–1951), American lawyer and politician and US ambassador to Germany
- Jim Gerard (Richard James Gerard; born 1936), New Zealand politician
- James Gerard (clergyman) (1741–1783), warden of Wadham College, Oxford
- James Gilbert Gerard (1795–1835), Scottish surgeon and explorer

== See also ==
- James Gerard Kennedy Sr. (1907–1997), founder of James G. Kennedy & Company
- James Joseph Gerrard, bishop of the Catholic Church in the United States
- Gerard James (disambiguation)
