= George William Coleman =

American Catholic bishop (1939–2024)

His Excellency, The Most Reverend George William Coleman
- Bishop of Fall River
- See: Diocese of Fall River
- Appointed: April 30, 2003
- Installed: July 22, 2003
- Retired: July 3, 2014
- Predecessor: Seán Patrick O'Malley
- Successor: Edgar Moreira da Cunha

Orders
- Ordination: December 16, 1964 by Francis Frederick Reh
- Consecration: July 22, 2003 by Gabriel Montalvo Higuera, Daniel Anthony Cronin, and Seán Patrick O'Malley

Personal details
- Born: February 1, 1939 Fall River, Massachusetts, U.S.
- Died: May 24, 2024 (aged 85) Fall River
- Education: College of the Holy Cross; Saint John's Seminary; Pontifical North American College; Pontifical Gregorian University
- Motto: Domini sumus (We are the Lord's)

Styles of George William Coleman
- Reference style: His Excellency; The Most Reverend
- Spoken style: Your Excellency
- Religious style: Bishop

George William Coleman (February 1, 1939 – May 24, 2024) was an American prelate of the Roman Catholic Church. Coleman served as bishop of the Diocese of Fall River in Massachusetts from 2003 to 2014.

== Biography ==
=== Early life and education ===
George Coleman was born on February 1, 1939, to George and Beatrice (née Shea) Coleman in Fall River, Massachusetts; he had one sister, Eileen. Raised in Somerset, Massachusetts, he attended Village Elementary School. Coleman graduated from Monsignor James Coyle High School in Taunton, Massachusetts in 1957.

While studying at the College of the Holy Cross in Worcester, Massachusetts, Coleman decided to enter the priesthood. He attended St. John's Seminary in Boston and then the Pontifical North American College in Rome. Coleman completed his theological studies at the Pontifical Gregorian University in Rome, receiving a Licentiate in Theology.

=== Ordination and ministry ===
On December 16, 1964, Coleman was ordained to the priesthood in Rome at St. Peter's Basilica by Bishop Francis Reh for the Diocese of Fall River. On returning to Massachusetts, Coleman served as associate pastor of St. Kilian's Parish in New Bedford, Massachusetts. In 1967, he was assigned to ministry at St. Louis Parish in Fall River and in 1972 to Our Lady of Victory Parish in Centerville, Massachusetts.

In 1977, Coleman was appointed director of the diocesan Department of Education. He assumed the additional post in 1982 of pastor of St. Patrick's Parish in Fall River. From 1985 to 1994, Coleman served as pastor of Corpus Christi Parish in Sandwich, Massachusetts, concurrently serving as dean of the Cape Cod & Islands Deanery in the diocese from 1990 to 1994.

In 1994, Coleman was appointed vicar general and moderator of the curia of Fall River by then Bishop Seán O'Malley. Coleman was also raised to the rank of honorary prelate of his holiness in 1994 by Pope John Paul II. When Bishop O'Malley was appointed in 2002 as bishop of the Diocese of Palm Beach, John Paul II chose Coleman to serve as diocesan administrator for the Diocese of Fall River.

=== Bishop of Fall River ===
On April 30, 2003, John Paul II appointed Coleman as the seventh bishop of Fall River. He was consecrated at the Cathedral of Saint Mary of the Assumption in Fall River on July 22, 2003, by Archbishop Gabriel Higuera, with Archbishop Daniel Cronin and Bishop O'Malley serving as co-consecrators. For his episcopal motto, Coleman chose Letter to the Romans (14:8): "Domini sumus -- We are the Lord's".

=== Retirement and death ===
On July 3, 2014, Pope Francis accepted Coleman's resignation as bishop of Fall River.Coleman died on May 24, 2024, in Fall River at the age of 85.

== See also ==
- Catholic Church hierarchy
- Catholic Church in the United States
- Historical list of the Catholic bishops of the United States
- List of Catholic bishops of the United States
- Lists of patriarchs, archbishops, and bishops

== Episcopal succession ==
Catholic Church titles
Preceded by Seán Patrick O'Malley, OFM Cap	Bishop of Fall River; 2003–2014	Succeeded by Edgar Moreira da Cunha, S.D.V.
