= Humberto Sousa Medeiros =

Catholic cardinal (1915–1983)

His Eminence Humberto Sousa Medeiros GCC GCIH
- Cardinal, Archbishop of Boston
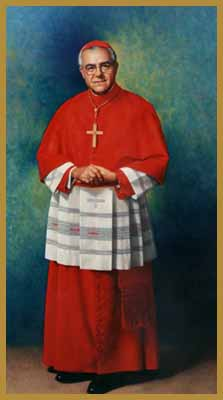
- See: Boston
- Appointed: September 8, 1970
- Installed: October 7, 1970
- Term ended: September 17, 1983
- Predecessor: Richard Cushing
- Successor: Bernard Law
- Other post: Cardinal-Priest of Santa Susanna
- Previous post: Bishop of Brownsville (1966-1970)

Orders
- Ordination: June 15, 1946 by James Edwin Cassidy
- Consecration: June 9, 1966 by James Louis Connolly
- Created cardinal: March 5, 1973 by Paul VI
- Rank: Cardinal-priest

Personal details
- Born: October 6, 1915 Arrifes, São Miguel Island, Azores, First Portuguese Republic
- Died: September 17, 1983 (aged 67) Boston, Massachusetts, US
- Motto: Adveniat regnum tuum (Thy kingdom come)

Styles of Humberto Sousa Medeiros
- Reference style: His Eminence
- Spoken style: Your Eminence
- Informal style: Cardinal
- See: Boston

Humberto Sousa Medeiros GCC GCIH (October 6, 1915 – September 17, 1983) was a Portuguese-born American Catholic prelate who served as Archbishop of Boston from 1970 until his death in 1983, and was created a cardinal in 1973. Medeiros previously serve as Bishop of Brownsville from 1966 to 1970.

An ecclesiastical conservative, Medeiros was considered a champion of the immigrant worker, the poor and minorities. Medeiros was an outspoken opponent of capitalism, denouncing an economic system that "considers profit the key motive for economic progress, competition the maximum law of economics, and private ownership of the means of production an absolute right that carries no corresponding social obligations." His appointment as Archbishop of Boston was controversial among Irish Catholics, who viewed the Portuguese as "third-class Catholics". The protests against the new archbishop included vandalism against the local Catholic institutions and a burning cross on the lawn of the diocese's chancery.

Medeiros criticized the American involvement in the Vietnam War and condemned the bombing of Hanoi in a 1972 Christmas homily. He strongly supported integration in the United States, but did not support desegregation busing; nevertheless, he refused to let parents enroll their children in parochial schools as a means of avoiding it. His policies on the topic of sexual abuse were controversial. Medeiros transferred John Geoghan from parish to parish, despite multiple credible accusations of sexual abuse by Geoghan. He personally knew of dozens of sexual abuse accusations against Paul Shanley.

== Early life ==
Humberto Sousa Medeiros was born on October 6, 1915, in the civil parish of Arrifes, on the island of São Miguel, Azores, a part of Portugal, to Antonio Medeiros and Maria de Jesus Sousa Massa Flor. He was baptized in the parish of Nossa Senhora da Saúde on November 1, 1915. His father raised vegetables and ran a small variety store. In 1931, the Medeiros family emigrated to the United States, settling in Fall River, Massachusetts. The family attended St. Michael's Parish in Fall River, a national parish for the Portuguese.

Forced to leave school at age 16, Humberto swept floors in a local textile mill for 62 cents a day, studying English in his spare time. He was able to return to school in 1935, when his younger brothers became old enough to work to support the family. After graduating first in his class from B.M.C. Durfee High School Fall River in 1937, he went to Washington, D.C. to attend the Catholic University of America. He became a naturalized American citizen and obtained a Master of Philosophy degree in 1942 and a Licentiate of Sacred Theology in 1946.

== Priesthood ==
Medeiros was ordained to the priesthood in Fall River by Bishop James Edwin Cassidy on June 15, 1946. After his ordination, the diocese assigned Medeiros as an assistant pastor at St. John of God Parish in Somerset, Massachusetts. In 1949, he returned to Catholic University to pursue his doctoral studies. He earned a Doctor of Sacred Theology from the Pontifical Gregorian University in Rome in 1952.

After returning to Fall River, Medeiros was assigned to Holy Name Parish in Fall River and named assistant chancellor of the diocese. He later served as vicar for religious, vice-chancellor, and finally chancellor. The Vatican elevated him to the title of monsignor in 1958. Medeiros was named pastor of St. Michael's Parish in 1960.

== Episcopal ministry ==
Ordination history of Humberto Sousa Medeiros
History
Priestly ordination
- Ordained by: James Edwin Cassidy
- Date: June 15, 1946
Episcopal consecration
- Principal consecrator: James Louis Connolly
- Co-consecrators: James Joseph Gerrard, Gerald Vincent McDevitt
- Date: June 9, 1966
- Place: St. Mary's Cathedral, Fall Rivers, Massachusetts
Cardinalate
- Elevated by: Pope Paul VI
- Date: March 5, 1973
Episcopal succession
Bishops consecrated by Humberto Sousa Medeiros as principal consecrator
- Lawrence Joseph Riley: February 2, 1972
- Joseph Francis Maguire: February 2, 1972
- Thomas Vose Daily: February 11, 1975
- John Michael D'Arcy: February 11, 1975
- Joseph John Ruocco: February 11, 1975
- John Joseph Mulcahy: February 11, 1975
- Daniel Anthony Hart: October 18, 1976
- Alfred Clifton Hughes: September 14, 1981

=== Bishop of Brownsville ===
Coat of arms as bishop of Brownsville

On April 14, 1966, Medeiros was appointed bishop of Brownsville by Pope Paul VI. He received his episcopal ordination on June 9, 1966, from Bishop James Louis Connolly, with bishops James Joseph Gerrard and Gerald Vincent McDevitt serving as co-consecrators, at St. Mary's Cathedral in Fall River.

Medeiros' appointment to Brownsville came at the time of a threatened farm workers' strike. Many of the lay faithful of the diocese were Mexican-American migrant workers. At the beginning of his tenure as bishop, Medeiros sold the episcopal limousine and converted most of the episcopal residence into a dormitory for visiting priests. He frequently traveled with migrant workers to celebrate mass in the fields during the harvest season. Medeiros spent Christmas and Easter visiting prisoners in Texas jails. He also served as the chaplain of the Texas state council of the Knights of Columbus.

=== Archbishop of Boston ===
Medeiros was appointed archbishop of Boston on September 8, 1970. He was installed on October 7th, 1970. The appointment of Medeiros, a Portuguese-American, surprised Irish Catholics in Boston, as they had long dominated the local clergy. Some Irish Catholics in Boston considered the Portuguese to be "third-class Catholics". In the days leading up to and following Medeiros' arrival, local Catholic institutions were targeted by vandals. In one instance a cross was burned on the lawn of the diocese's chancery.

Pope Paul VI created Medeiros as cardinal priest of the Church of Santa Susanna in Rome during the consistory of March 5, 1973. Medeiros in 1974 pleaded with the Vatican to lift the excommunication of Reverend Leonard Feeney, who disobeyed church authority and took a strict interpretation of the doctrine of Extra Ecclesiam nulla salus.

Medeiros served as a special papal envoy to the celebration of the 60th anniversary of the apparitions of Our Lady of Fátima in Portugal in May 1977.He participated in the conclaves of August and October 1978, that selected Popes John Paul I and John Paul II, respectively.

Medeiros transferred Reverend John Geoghan from parish to parish despite multiple credible accusations of sexual abuse. He knew of dozens of sexual abuse accusations against Paul Shanley.

=== Death ===
Medeiros died on September 17, 1983, from heart failure during open heart surgery in Boston, at age 67. He was interred by request with his parents in Saint Patrick's Cemetery in Fall River. Massachusetts Governor Michael Dukakis described Medeiros as a "gentle, compassionate man".

== Legacy ==
- The Cardinal Medeiros Towers is a federal housing development for the elderly and disabled in Fall River.
- The Cardinal Medeiros Residence for retired priests is located in Fall River.
- The Cardinal Medeiros Trust fund was created in 1981 by the Texas Knights of Columbus State Council Charities to provide educational grants to families of Knights.
- Boston College named the freshman honors dormitory "Medeiros" in his honor.
- Cardinal Medeiros Avenue in Cambridge, Massachusetts, is named after him.
- The main auditorium of the Catholic University of Portugal's campus in Lisbon is named in his honor.
- A statue on his honor was inaugurated in his home parish of Arrifes on 10 June 2000, at the Portugal Day.

== Viewpoints ==
=== Abortion ===
In 1971, Medeiros described abortion as "the new barbarism". In 1974, Medeiros refused to allow the baptism in the archdiocese of the child of a Marlboro, Massachusetts, woman who supported the establishment of an abortion-information clinic.

Before the primaries for the 1980 US congressional elections, Medeiros issued a pastoral letter that stated, "Those who make abortion possible by law cannot separate themselves from the guilt which accompanies this horrendous crime and deadly sin." His words were considered to be directed at pro-choice candidates for congress James Michael Shannon and Barney Frank. Medeiros was criticized by some as violating the separation of church and state.

=== Capitalism ===
Medeiros' pastoral letter "Man's Cities, God's Poor" for Boston in 1972 reflected his passion for the poor.

Medeiros was an advocate of workers, supporting their demands for a minimum wage at $1.25 an hour. He also became known as an outspoken opponent of capitalism, denouncing an economic system that "considers profit the key motive for economic progress, competition the maximum law of economics, and private ownership of the means of production an absolute right that carries no corresponding social obligations."

=== Race ===
Medeiros strongly supported racial integration in the United States, but not desegregation via busing. He refused to let parents enroll their children in parochial schools as a means of avoiding it. In May 1976, he spoke out against the racism in South Boston, but apologized the following week.

=== War ===
An opponent of American involvement in the 1965 to 1975 Vietnam War, Medeiros condemned the 1972 bombing of Hanoi in what was then North Vietnam in a 1972 Christmas homily.

== Honors ==
- Grand-Cross of the Order of Christ, Portugal (3 March 1972)
- Grand-Cross of the Order of Prince Henry, Portugal (21 May 1972)

Catholic Church titles
Preceded by Richard Cushing	Archbishop of Boston; 1970–1983	Succeeded by Bernard Francis Law
Preceded by Adolph Marx	Bishop of Brownsville; 1966–1970	Succeeded by John Joseph Fitzpatrick
