= Frederick Anthony Donaghy =

American Catholic missionary and bishop

The Most Reverend Frederick A. Donaghy, M.M.
- Bishop of Wuzhou
- Church: Catholic Church
- Appointed: April 11, 1946
- Term ended: 1983

Orders
- Ordination: January 27, 1929
- Consecration: September 21, 1939 by James Edwin Cassidy

Personal details
- Born: January 13, 1903 New Bedford, Massachusetts
- Died: February 5, 1988 (aged 85) Ossining, New York

Frederick Anthony Donaghy, M.M. (January 13, 1903 – February 5, 1988) was an American-born Catholic missionary and bishop. As a member of the Catholic Foreign Mission Society of America (Maryknoll), he was assigned to missions in China. He served as the Bishop of Wuzhou from 1956–1975.

== Early life and education ==
Donaghy was born in New Bedford, Massachusetts, as one of six children to James and Rose (King) Donaghy. He graduated from the College of the Holy Cross in Worcester, Massachusetts, with a Bachelor of Arts in 1925 and began his studies for the priesthood at St. Mary's Seminary in Baltimore. His brother, William, became a Jesuit and later served as the president of the College of the Holy Cross.

Donaghy professed vows in the Catholic Foreign Mission Society of America in 1928 and was ordained a priest on January 27, 1929.

== Priesthood ==
His first mission assignment was to Kaying and he became fluent in the Hakka dialect. He was engaged in pastoral work and taught in the minor seminary. He was then assigned to Tsungow where he spent seven years. On July 20, 1939 Pope Pius XII appointed him as the Titular Bishop of Setea and Vicar Apostolic of Wuzhou.

== Episcopacy ==
Donaghy was consecrated by Bishop James Cassidy of Fall River on September 21, 1939. The principal co-consecrators were Bishop James Walsh, M.M., the Superior General of Maryknoll, and Auxiliary Bishop Richard Cushing of Boston. During World War II, Donaghy remained in Wuchow and was involved with relief work. Donaghy was appointed the first bishop of Wuzhou by Pope Pius XII on April 11, 1946. The Communists took over Wuchow three years later. He was interned for six months and then placed under house arrest before he was expelled from China in 1955. Donaghy was then named Dean of Miaoli and Group Superior for Maryknoll in Taiwan, Hong Kong and the Philippines. He served as Regional Superior of the Formosa-Hong Kong Region for two terms. Donaghy established the Congregation of the Sisters of the Sacred Hearts of Jesus and Mary. They are the first local congregation of religious sisters that were founded in Taipei. He attended all four sessions of the Second Vatican Council. He continued to be recognized as the diocesan bishop of Wuchow until his resignation was accepted by Pope John Paul II in 1983.

== Later life and death ==
Donaghy continued to live and work in Taiwan until 1987 when his decline in health forced his retirement to the St. Teresa Residence at Maryknoll in New York. He died there on February 5, 1988, at the age of 85. His funeral was celebrated at Maryknoll and he was buried, as he had wished, in the West Mountain Cemetery in Miaoli, Taiwan.
