= Gerard James (disambiguation) =

Gérard James is an American set decorator.

Gerard James may also refer to:

- Gerard Luz James (born 1953), United States Virgin Islander politician, funeral director and businessman
- Gerard James of the James baronets

== See also ==
- Gerard James Butler (born 1969), Scottish actor, producer, and singer
- James Gerard (disambiguation)
- Jerry James (disambiguation)
