= Jerry James =

Jerry James (or variants) may refer to:

- Jerry James (radio), of Heart Kent
- Gerry James, Canadian football player
- Jerry James, co-founder of Burning Man
- Jerry James, fictional character in Milwaukee, Minnesota

== See also ==
- Gerard James (disambiguation)
- Gerald James (disambiguation)
- Jeremy James (disambiguation)
