= Edgar Moreira da Cunha =

Brazilian-born American prelate

His Excellency, The Most Reverend Edgar Moreira da Cunha S.D.V.
- Bishop of Fall River
- Church: Roman Catholic Church
- Diocese: Fall River
- Appointed: July 3, 2014
- Installed: September 24, 2014
- Predecessor: George William Coleman
- Previous post: Auxiliary Bishop of Newark and Titular Bishop of Ucres (2003–2014)

Orders
- Ordination: March 27, 1982 by Joseph Abel Francis, SVD
- Consecration: August 4, 2003 by John J. Myers, Nicholas Anthony DiMarzio, and Arthur J. Serratelli

Personal details
- Born: August 21, 1953 (age 73) Riachão do Jacuípe, Brazil
- Education: Catholic University of Salvador; Immaculate Conception Seminary School of Theology
- Motto: Sufficit tibi gratia mea (My grace is enough for you)

Styles of Edgar Moreira da Cunha, S.D.V.
- Reference style: His Excellency; The Most Reverend
- Spoken style: Your Excellency
- Religious style: Bishop

Ordination history of Edgar Moreira da Cunha
History
Episcopal consecration
- Consecrated by: John J. Myers

Edgar Moreira da Cunha, S.D.V. (born August 21, 1953) is a Brazilian-born American Catholic prelate who has served as Bishop of Fall River in Massachusetts since 2014. He previously served as an auxiliary bishop of the Archdiocese of Newark in New Jersey and is a member of the Vocationists.

== Biography ==
=== Early life ===
Edgar M. da Cunha was born on August 21, 1953, in Nova Fátima, Bahia State, in Brazil. Deciding to become a priest as a teenager, he entered a minor seminary in Riachão do Jacuípe, Brazil that was run by the Vocationists. He professed his vows to the order on February 11, 1975.

Da Cunha later studied philosophy at the Catholic University of Salvador in Salvador, Brazil. He made his perpetual vows to the Vocationist Fathers on February 11, 1979. Da Cunha then moved to the United States to study theology at Immaculate Conception Seminary at Seton Hall University in South Orange, New Jersey. Da Cunha graduated from Immaculate Conception with a Master of Divinity degree.

=== Priesthood ===
Da Cunha was ordained into the priesthood for the Vocationist Fathers in the Church of St. Michael in Newark, New Jersey, on March 27, 1982, by Auxiliary Bishop Joseph Francis.

After his ordination, the Vocationist Fathers assigned Da Cunha in 1982 to serve as their director of vocations. The next year, he was also named as parochial vicar of Saint Nicholas Parish in Palisades Park, New Jersey. Da Cunha would later serve as parish administrator and finally as pastor. His tenure at the parish would last 18 years.

The Vocationist Fathers in 1998 appointed da Cunha as the master of novices and director of their House of Formation in Florham Park, New Jersey. They also appointed him as secretary of the Council of the Delegation of the Society of Divine Vocations. Da Cunha left Saint Nicholas in 2000 to become pastor at St. Michael's Parish in Newark, where he started a Portuguese language mass for Brazilian immigrants.

=== Auxiliary Bishop of Newark ===
Da Cunha was appointed an auxiliary bishop of Newark and titular bishop of Ucres on June 27, 2003, by Pope John Paul II. Da Cunha was consecrated at the Cathedral Basilica of the Sacred Heart in Newark on September 3, 2003, by Archbishop John J Myers, with Bishops Nicholas DiMarzio, and Arthur J. Serratelli serving as co-consecrators. Da Cunha became the first Brazilian-born Catholic bishop in the United States.

In October 2003, Myers appointed da Cunha as the regional bishop for Essex County, New Jersey. In 2005, Myers named him as vicar for evangelization and in 2013 as vicar general for the archdiocese. Da Cunha also served as a member of the archdiocesan board of consultors, the presbyteral council, the clergy personnel board, and the New Jersey Catholic Conference (NJCC) board of bishops.

=== Bishop of Fall River ===
On July 3, 2014, da Cunha was appointed by Pope Francis as the eighth bishop of Fall River; da Cunha was installed on September 24, 2014.

In May 2019, da Cunha suspended from ministry Reverend Bruce Neylon, pastor of Holy Trinity Parish in Fall River. The diocese had received credible accusations that Neylon had sexually abused a minor during the 1980s. On January 7, 2021, the diocese released a list of 75 priests who had been credibly accused or publicly accused of sexual abuse of minors and vulnerable adults. At that time, Da Cunha made this statement:

As your bishop, I am deeply and profoundly sorry for the abuse that was perpetrated by priests within this diocese and have recommitted myself to do everything in my power to ensure this never happens again.”

== See also ==
- Catholic Church hierarchy
- Catholic Church in the United States
- Historical list of the Catholic bishops of the United States
- List of Catholic bishops of the United States
- Lists of patriarchs, archbishops, and bishops

== Episcopal succession ==
Catholic Church titles
Preceded by George William Coleman	Bishop of Fall River; 2014–present	Incumbent
Preceded by –	Auxiliary Bishop of Newark; 2003–2014	Succeeded by –
