= Daniel Francis Feehan =

American prelate

His Excellency, The Most Reverend Daniel Francis Feehan
- Bishop of Fall River
- See: Diocese of Fall River
- In office: September 19, 1907; July 19, 1934
- Predecessor: William Stang
- Successor: James Edwin Cassidy

Orders
- Ordination: December 29, 1879 by Francis McNeirny
- Consecration: September 19, 1907 by Thomas Beaven

Personal details
- Born: September 24, 1855 Athol, Massachusetts
- Died: July 19, 1934 (aged 78)
- Denomination: Roman Catholic
- Education: St. Mary's College; St. Joseph's Seminary

Daniel Francis Feehan (September 24, 1855 – July 19, 1934) was an American Catholic prelate who served as bishop of Fall River in Massachusetts from 1907 until his death in 1934.

== Biography ==
=== Early life ===
Daniel Feehan was born on September 24, 1855, in Athol, Massachusetts, to William and Joanna (née Foley) Feehan. When he was a young child, his family moved to Millbury, Massachusetts. Feehan attended public schools in Millbury, where he befriended future US President William Howard Taft.

Feehan completed his classical and philosophical studies at St. Mary's College in Montreal, Quebec, graduating with a Bachelor of Arts degree in 1876. He then studied theology at St. Joseph's Seminary in Troy, New York, for three years.

=== Priesthood ===
Feehan was ordained to the priesthood at St. Joseph's for the Diocese of Springfield in Massachusetts by Bishop Francis McNeirny on December 29, 1879. After his ordination, the diocese assigned Feehan in 1879 as a curate at St. Bernard's Parish in Fitchburg, Massachusetts. He was transferred in 1886 to serve as pastor of St. Luke's Parish in West Boylston, Massachusetts. In 1889, he returned to St. Bernard's, serving there rector until 1907.

=== Bishop of Fall River ===
On July 2, 1907, Feehan was appointed the second bishop of Fall River by Pope Pius X. He received his episcopal consecration on September 19, 1907, at St. Mary of the Assumption Cathedral in Fall River from Bishop Thomas Beaven, with Bishops Matthew Harkins and Michael Tierney serving as co-consecrators. During his 27-year tenure, he became known as the "Benevolent Bishop" and established thirty-six parishes.

In January 1934, Pope Pius IX named Reverend James Edwin Cassidy as coadjutor bishop of the diocese to serve as Feehan's assistant and successor.

=== Death and legacy ===
Daniel Feehan died on July 19, 1934, at age 78. Bishop Feehan High School, a parochial school in Attleboro, Massachusetts, was named after him when it opened in 1961.

Catholic Church titles
Preceded by William Stang	Bishop of Fall River; 1907 – 1934	Succeeded by James Edwin Cassidy
