= Gerald James (disambiguation) =

Gerald James (1917–2006) was a British actor.

Gerald James may also refer to:

- Gerald James (cricketer) (1908–1967), Australian cricketer
- Gerry James (Gerald James, born 1934), Canadian football and ice hockey player
- For the British businessman in the Arms-to-Iraq affair, see Arms-to-Iraq

== See also ==
- Jerry James (disambiguation)
