= Gerald James =

British actor (1917–2006)

This is about the British actor. For others with this name, see Gerald James (disambiguation)

Gerald James (26 November 1917 – 10 June 2006) was a British actor best known for his character actor roles in British television productions such as The Sandbaggers, The Professionals, Secret Army, Sapphire & Steel, Hadleigh, The Pickwick Papers and The Ghosts of Motley Hall. He also appeared on stage with the Royal Shakespeare Company.

== Filmography ==
Year	Title	Role	Notes
1974	The Man with the Golden Gun	Frazier	
1978	My Way Home	Mr Bridge	
1978	Off to Philadelphia in the Morning	Mr Thomas	
1979	Yanks	Hotel porter	
1979	Sapphire and Steel	Mr Tully	
1987	Hope and Glory	Headmaster	
