= James Joseph Gerrard =

American Catholic bishop (1897–1991)

His Excellency, The Most Reverend James Joseph Gerrard
- Auxiliary Bishop of Fall River
- Church: Catholic Church
- See: Titular See of Forma
- Appointed: February 2, 1959
- In office: March 19, 1959 - January 12, 1976

Orders
- Ordination: May 26, 1923 by Daniel Francis Feehan
- Consecration: March 19, 1959 by James Louis Connolly

Personal details
- Born: June 9, 1897 New Bedford, Massachusetts, US
- Died: June 3, 1991 (aged 93) Fall River, Massachusetts, US
- Education: St. Laurent College; St. Bernard's Seminary

James Joseph Gerrard (June 9, 1897 – June 3, 1991) was a bishop of the Catholic Church in the United States. He served as an auxiliary bishop of the Diocese of Fall River in Massachusetts from 1959 to 1976.

== Biography ==
=== Early life ===
James Gerrard was born on June 9, 1897, in New Bedford, Massachusetts. He was educated at Holy Family High School in New Bedford and St. Laurent College in Montreal. He studied for the priesthood at St. Bernard's Seminary in Rochester, New York.

=== Priesthood ===
Gerrard was ordained a priest on May 26, 1923, for the Diocese of Fall River by Bishop Daniel Francis Feehan.

=== Auxiliary Bishop of Fall River ===
On February 2, 1959 Pope John XXIII appointed Gerrard as the titular bishop of Forma and auxiliary bishop of Fall River. He was consecrated at the Cathedral of Saint Mary of the Assumption in Fall River, Massachusetts, by Bishop James Connolly on March 19, 1959 The principal co-consecrators were Bishop Russell McVinney and Auxiliary Bishop Jeremiah Minihan. Gerrard attended the second session of the Second Vatican Council in 1963 in Rome.

Gerrard served as auxiliary bishop of Fall River until his resignation was accepted by Pope Paul VI on January 12, 1976. He died at the Catholic Memorial Home in Fall River, Massachusetts on June 3, 1991, at the age of 93.
