= William Stang =

German-born American prelate

His Excellency, The Right Reverend William Stang
- Bishop of Fall River
- See: Diocese of Fall River
- In office: May 1, 1904 - February 2, 1907
- Successor: Daniel Francis Feehan

Orders
- Ordination: June 15, 1878 by Victor-Auguste-Isidor Deschamps
- Consecration: May 1, 1904 by Matthew Harkins

Personal details
- Born: April 21, 1854 Langenbrücken, Grand Duchy of Baden, (now Germany)
- Died: February 2, 1907 (aged 52) Rochester, Minnesota, US
- Denomination: Roman Catholic
- Education: Sint-Niklaas minor seminary American College of Louvain
- Motto: Super rivos aquarum fructificate (Be fruitful above the streams of water)

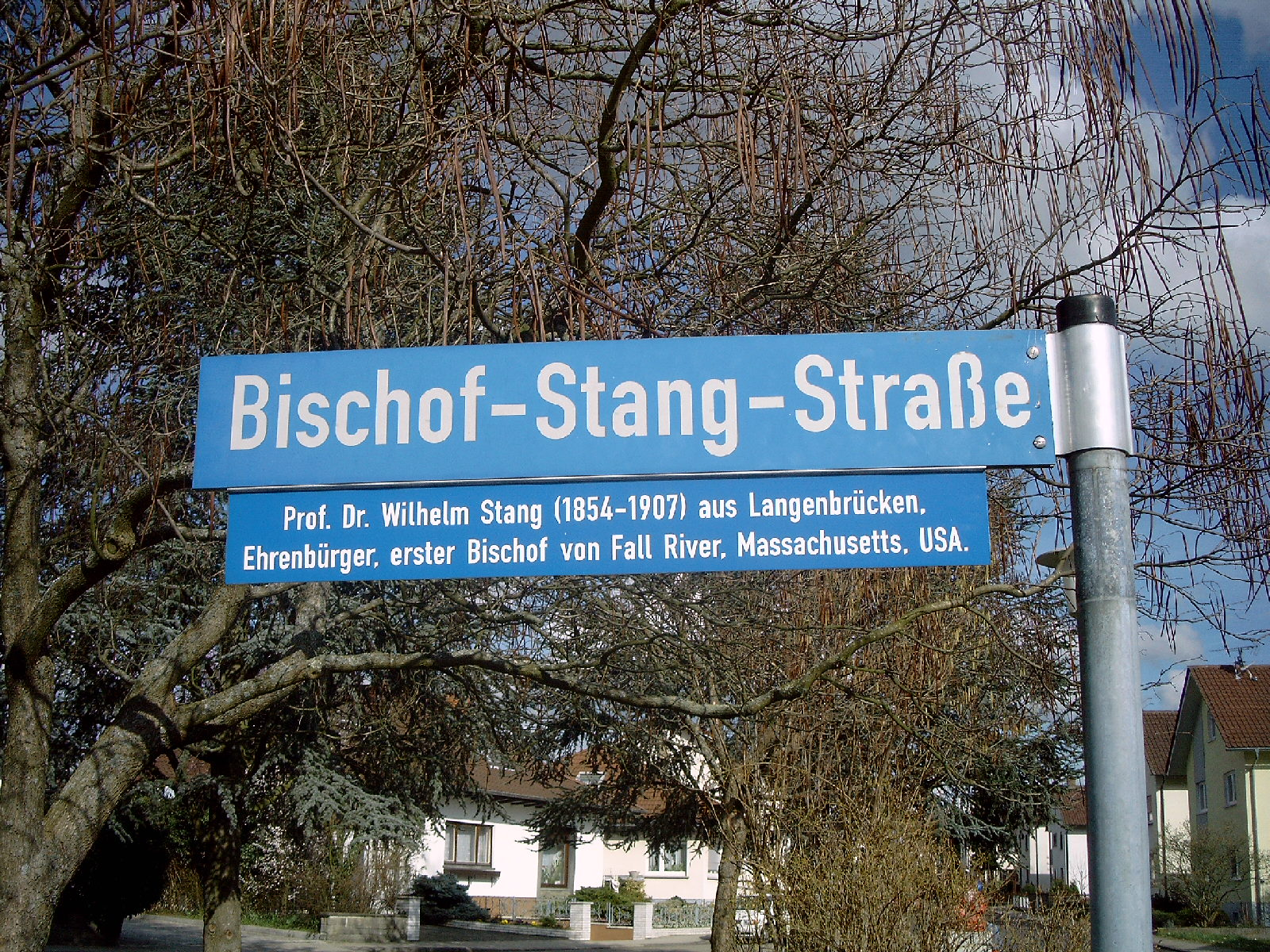
Street name in Bad Schönborn / Langenbrücken, Germany (2007)

William Stang (April 21, 1854 – February 2, 1907) was a German Catholic prelate who served as the first Bishop of Fall River from 1904 until his death in 1907.

== Biography ==
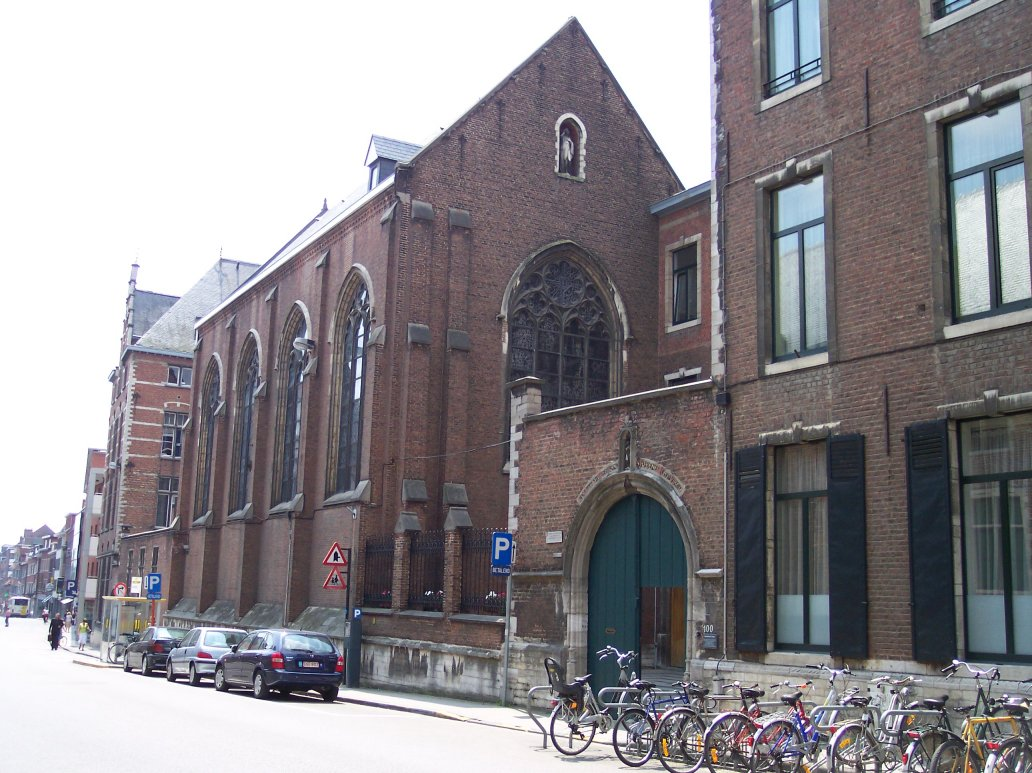
Former American College of Leuven, Leuven, Belgium

=== Early life ===
William Stang was born on April 21, 1854, in Langenbrücken in the Grand Duchy of Baden (in present-day Germany). He received his early education at the local gymnasium and then attended the minor seminary of Sint-Niklaas in Belgium.

Stang entered the American College of Leuven in Leuven, Belgium, in 1875, where he completed his theological studies. During this period, American dioceses were actively looking for priests in Europe. While at the American College, Stang was recruited by Thomas Hendricken, bishop of the Diocese of Providence in the United States, to minister to German-speaking Catholics in Rhode Island.

=== Priesthood ===
Stang was ordained to the priesthood in Mechelen, Belgium, by Cardinal Victor-Auguste-Isidore Dechamps for the Diocese of Providence on June 15, 1878. After his ordination, Stang taught for a few months at the Catholic University of Leuven in Leuven.

Stang immigrated to the United States in September 1878, settling in Providence, Rhode Island. The diocese assigned him primarily to minister to the German Catholic community while also serving as a curate at the Cathedral of Sts. Peter and Paul in Providence. He was named pastor of St. Anne's Parish in Cranston, Rhode Island, in 1884. Hendricken named Stang as rector of the Cathedral of Saints Peter and Paul, preaching in German there. Stang's ambition was to establish a German-language parish in the diocese, but the small German population of the diocese was unable to fund it.

When the Vatican appointed Reverend Matthew Harkins as bishop of Providence in 1886, Stang became one of his closest advisors. In 1887, Stang received a Doctor of Theology Degree from Georgetown University in Washington D.C. After returned to Providence, Stang was a driving force behind the founding in 1892 of St. Joseph's Hospital in Providence.

In 1895, Stang travelled to Belgium to serve at the Catholic University of Leuven as vice-rector and professor of moral theology. At Harkins' urging, Stang returned to Providence in 1899. While supervising St. Joseph's Hospital, he also became head of the diocesan Apostolate band. He was named pastor of St. Edward Parish in Providence in 1901 and also served as chancellor of the diocese.

=== Bishop of Fall River ===
On March 12, 1904, Stang was appointed the first bishop of the newly created Diocese of Fall River by Pope Pius X. He received his episcopal consecration on May 1, 1904, from Harkins, with Bishops Michael Tierney and John Brady serving as co-consecrators, at the Cathedral of Saints Peter and Paul,. On May 8, 1904, the Cathedral of St. Mary of the Assumption in Fall River was packed with worshippers for Stang's first mass. Police detachments had to control the crowd, estimated at 25,000 people, outside the building.

Throughout the 19th century, very few American religious sisters were available to teach in parish schools; they had to come from Europe and Ireland. During Stang's tenure, teaching sisters from the Holy Union order in France, fleeing secular regulation in that country, came to Rhode Island to minister to the growing Catholic French-Canadian population. Other Holy Union sisters came from Ireland to the diocese. Stang made it clear that he welcomed religious sisters of all nationalities. In his opinion, it was the priests who were most guilty of raising tensions between the ethnic groups in the diocese.

Catholic bishops of this era became concerned about the attraction of socialism to Catholic workers. A writer of several religious works, Stang authored a book titled Socialism and Christianity. It supported the rights of workers to organize in labor unions, but condemned socialism as anti-Catholic. In 1905, Stang addressed 4,000 attendees of the New York German Catholic State Federation meeting in Carnegie Hall in New York City. Speaking in German, Stang lamented the Catholic working men who had allegedly thrown down the bible and embraced socialism. He urged all Catholic societies to combat this menace.

During his short tenure as bishop, Stang established eleven parishes in the diocese. One new parishe was St. Boniface, a German-language parish in New Bedford, Massachusetts. Stang once described divorce as a pernicious practice...contrary to the moral order and the law of Christ, and condemned Saturday dances as a source of scandal [that] must be stopped at once. During Stang's tenure, the Dominican Sisters of the Presentation founded Saint Anne's Hospital in Fall River in 1906.

=== Death and legacy ===
In January 1907, Stang travelled to the Mayo Clinic in Rochester, Minnesota, for surgery to removed an intestinal tumor. The surgery was successful, but he developed an infection. William Stang died on February 2, 1907, in the Mayo Clinic at age 52.

Bishop Stang High School in North Dartmouth, Massachusetts, founded in 1959, is named in his honor. He is a member of the Rhode Island Heritage Hall of Fame in East Providence, Rhode Island.

== Published works ==
- The Life of Martin Luther
- The Eve of the Reformation
- More About the Huguenots, a response to a lecture by Professor William Granmell the Huguenots and the Edict of Nantes
- Germany's Debt to Ireland
- Pastoral Theology (1896)
- Historiographia Ecclesiastica (1897)
- The Business Guide for Priests (1899)
- Theologia Fundamentalis Moralis
- The Devil, Who He Is
- Spiritual Pepper and Salt (1901)
- Socialism and Christianity (1905)
- Medulla Fundamentalis Theologiae Moralis (1906).

Stang was also a contributor to the American Ecclesiastical Review.

== Publications ==
- Pastoral theology (New York, 1897)
- Historiographia Ecclesiastica quam historiae seriam solidamque operam navantibus (Freiburg, 1897)
- Business Guide for Priests (New York, 1899)
- The Devil, Who He Is and What He Does (Providence, 1900)
- Sozialismus und Christentum, with Rudolf Amberg (Socialism and Christendom, Einsiedeln, 1907)
- The Holy Hour of Adoration (New York, 1907)
- Medulla fundamentalis theologiae moralis quam seminaristis et presbyteris (Neo-Eboraci, Cincinnati, 1907)
- Life of Martin Luther
- The Eve of the Reformation
- More About the Huguenots
- Germany's Debt to Ireland
- Spiritual Pepper and Salt

== Episcopal succession ==
Catholic Church titles
| New title | Bishop of Fall River; 1904–1907 | Succeeded by Daniel Francis Feehan |
