= Joseph John Ruocco =

American Roman Catholic bishop

His Excellency, The Most Reverend Lawrence Joseph Riley
- Auxiliary Bishop of Boston; Titular Bishop of Polinianum
- Church: Catholic Church; Latin Church
- Archdiocese: Boston

Orders
- Ordination: May 6, 1948 by Richard Cushing
- Consecration: February 11, 1975 by Humberto Sousa Medeiros

Personal details
- Born: April 22, 1912 Boston, Massachusetts, US
- Died: July 26, 1980 (aged 68) Boston
- Motto: Deus caritas est (God is love)

Joseph John Ruocco (April 22, 1922 – July 26, 1980) was an American prelate of the Roman Catholic Church in the United States. He served as an auxiliary bishop of the Archdiocese of Boston in Massachusetts from 1975 to 1980.

== Early life ==
Joseph Ruocco was born in Boston, Massachusetts on April 22, 1922. He was ordained to the priesthood for the Archdiocese of Boston at the Cathedral of the Holy Cross in Boston on May 6, 1948 by Archbishop Richard Cushing.

== Auxiliary Bishop of Boston ==
On December 28, 1974, Ruocco was appointed titular bishop of Polinianum and auxiliary bishop of the Boston by Pope Paul VI. Ruocco was consecrated at the Cathedral of the Holy Cross by Cardinal Humberto Sousa Medeiros on February 11, 1975.

Ruocco died in Boston on July 26, 1980.
