= John Joseph Mulcahy =

His Excellency, The Most Reverend John Joseph Mulcahy
- Auxiliary Bishop of Boston; Titular Bishop of Penafiel
- Church: Catholic Church; Latin Church
- Archdiocese: Boston

Orders
- Ordination: May 6, 1948 by Richard Cushing
- Consecration: February 11, 1975 by Humberto Sousa Medeiros

Personal details
- Born: June 26, 1922 Boston, Massachusetts, US
- Died: April 29, 1994 (aged 71) Salem, Massachusetts, US
- Motto: Come Lord Jesus

John Joseph Mulcahy (June 26, 1922 – April 29, 1994) was an American prelate of the Roman Catholic Church in the United States. He served as an auxiliary bishop of the Archdiocese of Boston in Massachusetts from 1975 to 1992.

== Early life ==
John Mulcahy was born on June 26, 1922 in Boston, Massachusetts. He was ordained to the priesthood on May 1, 1947, for the Archdiocese of Boston by Cardinal Richard Cushing.

== Auxiliary Bishop of Boston ==
On December 28, 1974, Mulcahy was appointed titular bishop of Penafiel and auxiliary bishop of Boston by Pope Paul VI. He was consecrated at the Cathedral of the Holy Cross in Boston by Cardinal Humberto Sousa Medeiros on February 11, 1975.

Mulcahy resigned as auxiliary bishop of Boston on July 21, 1992. He died in Salem, Massachusetts, on April 29, 1994
