= James Edwin Cassidy =

American prelate

His Excellency, The Most Reverend James Edwin Cassidy
- Bishop of Fall River; Titular Bishop of Ibora
- See: Diocese of Fall River
- In office: July 28, 1934; May 17, 1951
- Predecessor: Daniel Francis Feehan
- Successor: James Louis Connolly
- Other posts: Auxiliary Bishop of Fall River (1930-1934); Coadjutor Bishop of Fall River (July 1934)

Orders
- Ordination: September 8, 1898 by Matthew Harkins
- Consecration: May 27, 1930 by Pietro Fumasoni Biondi

Personal details
- Born: August 1, 1869 Woonsocket, Rhode Island, US
- Died: May 17, 1951 (aged 81) Fall River, Massachusetts, US
- Denomination: Roman Catholic
- Education: St. Charles College; St. Mary's Seminary; Pontifical North American College
- Motto: In cruce salus (Salvation from the cross)

Ordination history of James Edwin Cassidy
History
Episcopal consecration
- Consecrated by: Pietro Fumasoni Biondi
- Date: May 27, 1930
Episcopal succession
Bishops consecrated by James Edwin Cassidy as principal consecrator
- Frederick Anthony Donaghy: September 21, 1939

James Edwin Cassidy GOC (August 1, 1869 – May 17, 1951) was an American prelate of the Roman Catholic Church. He served as bishop of the Diocese of Fall River in Massachusetts from 1934 until his death in 1951.

== Biography ==
=== Early life ===
James Cassidy was born on August 1, 1869, in Woonsocket, Rhode Island, to James and Mary (née Byrne) Cassidy. His father was from County Waterford and his mother from County Armagh in Ireland. James Cassidy attended St. Charles College in Ellicott City, Maryland, and St. Mary's Seminary in Baltimore. He continued his studies at the Pontifical North American College in Rome.

=== Priesthood ===
Cassidy was ordained to the priesthood in Providence, Rhode Island, by Bishop Matthew A. Harkins for the Diocese of Providence on September 8, 1898. Cassidy served as professor of science at St. Joseph's Seminary in Yonkers, New York, where he also worked as treasurer for three years. He then served a pastoral role at a parish in Attleboro, Massachusetts

Pope Pius X erected the Diocese of Fall River on March 12, 1904. At that point, Cassidy was incardinated, or transferred, from the Diocese of Providence to the new diocese. He was soon named chancellor of the diocese. From 1908 to 1913, Cassidy served as rector of St. Mary's Cathedral in Fall River. He was named vicar general of the diocese in 1909. The Vatican elevated him to the rank of domestic prelate in 1912. He was appointed pastor of St. Patrick's Parish in Fall River in 1913.

=== Auxiliary Bishop, Coadjutor Bishop and Bishop of Fall River ===
On March 21, 1930, Cassidy was appointed auxiliary bishop of Fall River and titular bishop of Ibora by Pope Pius XI. He received his episcopal consecration on May 27, 1930, from Archbishop Pietro Biondi, with Bishops Joseph John Rice and George Guertin serving as co-consecrators, at St. Mary's Cathedral. As an auxiliary bishop, he continued to serve as pastor of St. Patrick's and as vicar general.

Cassidy was named coadjutor bishop of the Diocese of Fall River on July 13, 1934. Upon the death of Bishop Daniel Feehan, Cassidy automatically succeeded him as the third bishop of Fall River on July 28, 1934.

During his 17-year tenure, Cassidy earned a reputation as a strong supporter of the Temperance movement a national movement against alcohol abuse. He also supported the rights of workingmen. He also took an active interest in the needs of the elderly, founding several homes for senior citizens.

In 1934, Cassidy called for the resignation of Will H. Hays as chairman of the Motion Picture Association of America. He stated that Hays was being "false to the trust imposed on him" and called him "a co-betrayer of with the movie industry of the sacred rights of parents to protection of the morals of their children." After the American entry into World War II in December 1941, Cassidy in 1942 declared that the Women's Army Auxiliary Corps (WAAC) contravened the teachings of the Catholic Church on the role of women. He expressed his hope that no Catholic women would join WAAC. Cassidy was the first American bishop to receive the crimson cross of the Order of Christ from the Portuguese government. In 1945, he received Reverend James Connolly as his coadjutor bishop.

In January 1951, Cassidy published a pastoral letter forbidding girls cheerleading at Catholic high schools in the diocese, citing the indecency of their outfits. He also banned football games at night.

=== Death and legacy ===
James Cassidy died on May 17, 1951, at his residence in Fall River at age 81.

== Honors ==
- Grand Officer of the Order of Christ, Portugal (22 September 1939)

Catholic Church titles
Preceded by Daniel Francis Feehan	Bishop of Fall River; 1934 – 1951	Succeeded by James Louis Connolly
