= St. John Paul II High School (Massachusetts) =

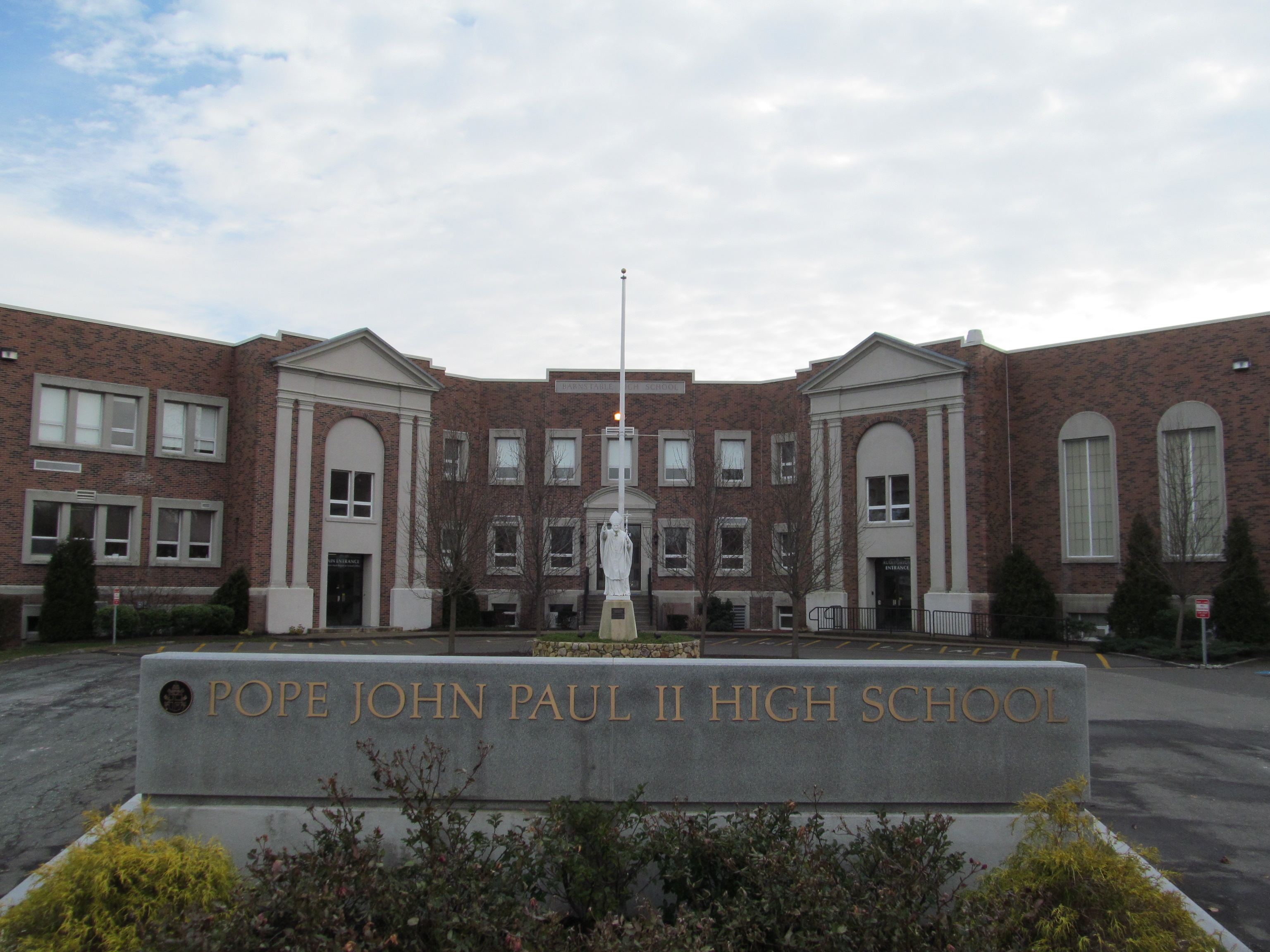

Location
- 120 High School Road; Hyannis, (Barnstable County), Massachusetts 02601; United States
- 41°38′53″N 70°17′5″W

Information
- School type: Private, High School
- Religious affiliation: Roman Catholic
- Established: 2007; 19 years ago
- Oversight: Diocese of Fall River
- Head of school: Mr. John Redding
- Teaching staff: 45.4 (FTE) (2015–16)
- Grades: 9–12
- Gender: Co-ed
- Enrollment: 496 (2015–16)
- Student to teacher ratio: 10.9∶1 (2015–16)
- Colors: Blue; Gold
- Athletics conference: Cape & Islands, Catholic Central
- Mascot: Lion
- Accreditation: New England Association of Schools and Colleges
- Communities served: Cape Cod, Martha's Vineyard, Nantucket
- Website: Official website

St. John Paul II School is a private, co-educational, Roman Catholic high school in Hyannis, Massachusetts serving students from Grade 5 to 12. It is located in the Roman Catholic Diocese of Fall River and maintains an enrollment of 450-500 students from Cape Cod, Canal Region, and South Shore area.

== Background ==
Operated by the Diocese of Fall River, St. John Paul II High School opened in 2007 (as Pope John Paul II High School) to serve the residents of Cape Cod, Massachusetts. In June 2013, the Diocese unified St. John Paul II High School with St. Francis Xavier Preparatory School (grades 5–8). The schools are located across the parking lot from each other. They operate as a 5–12 school with separate campuses for middle school and high school. Following the April 2014 canonization of St. John Paul II, Fall River Diocesan Bishop Edgar M. da Cunha, announced on December 8, 2014 that Pope John Paul II High School would now be called St. John Paul II High School.

In 2021, the school unified St. John Paul II High School (Gr. 9-12) and St. Francis Xavier Preparatory School (Gr. 5-8) and operate as one entity under a new name: St. John Paul II School.

== Academic programs ==
St. John Paul II School offers a college-preparatory curriculum, including College Preparatory, Honors, and Advanced Placement courses. In recent years, JPII offered AP English, AP Calculus AB, AP Biology, AP Chemistry, AP Physics, AP Environmental Science, AP U.S. History, AP Psychology, AP U.S. Government, AP Computer Science Principles, AP Seminar, and AP Statistics.
