= Coyle & Cassidy High School and Middle School =

Private high school in Taunton, Massachusetts, U.S.

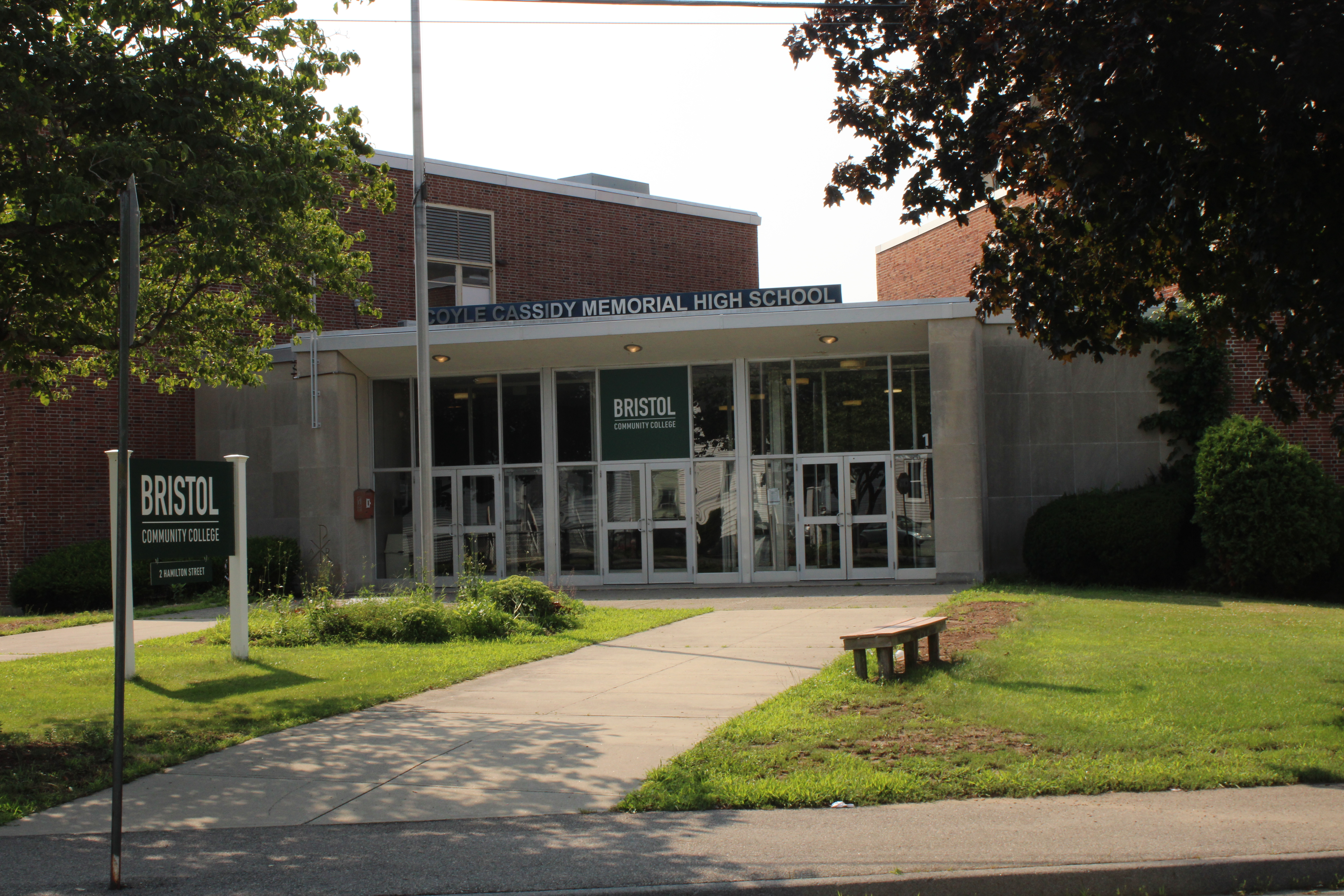
- The former school building, now a part of Bristol Community College, in 2023

Location
- 2 Hamilton Street; Taunton, Massachusetts 02780; United States; 41°54′33″N 71°5′42.5″W

Information
- Type: Private, coed high school
- Motto: Enter to Learn, Leave to Serve
- Religious affiliation: Roman Catholic
- Established: 1911
- Founder: James Coyle
- Closed: 2020
- Oversight: Diocese of Fall River
- CEEB code: 222120
- President: Chris Myron
- Principal: Kathleen St. Laurent
- Chaplain: William M. Rodrigues
- Grades: 9–12 (High School Division) 5–8 (Middle School Division)
- Enrollment: 503 (2013, before Middle School Division)
  - Grade 6: N/A
  - Grade 7: N/A
  - Grade 8: N/A
  - Grade 9: 111
  - Grade 10: 108
  - Grade 11: 151
  - Grade 12: 133
- Average class size: 24
- Student to teacher ratio: 13:1
- Campus: Urban
- Colors: Blue; Gold
- Slogan: Tradition Lives Here
- Fight song: "Charge On You Warriors"
- Athletics: MIAA
- Athletics conference: Eastern Athletic
- Sports: 22 varsity teams, 15 sports
- Mascot: Warrior
- Team name: Warriors
- Rivals: Taunton High School, Bishop Feehan High School
- Accreditation: New England Association of Schools and Colleges
- Newspaper: Warrior Word
- Tuition: High school: $10,050; Middle school: $8,850
- Website: Archived 9 January 2019 at the Wayback Machine

Coyle & Cassidy High School and Middle School (formerly St. Mary's High School, Monsignor Coyle High School, and Coyle and Cassidy High School) was a private, Catholic Diocesan school located in Taunton, Massachusetts, United States. The school had been a co-education middle and high school facility from 2014 until its 2020 closure. Coyle served students living within and beyond the Greater Taunton Area.

== History ==
=== 20th century ===
The school's history dates back to 1911, when Monsignor James Coyle, pastor of Saint Mary's Church, established Saint Mary's High School. The high school grew, and by the early 1930s the need for a larger school was apparent. In 1933, shortly after Monsignor Coyle's death, Monsignor Coyle High School opened on Summer Street, staffed by the Brothers of the Holy Cross. The boys' population transferred to Coyle, and the girls' population stayed at Saint Mary's under the guidance of the Holy Union Sisters. In 1963, a new high school for girls was opened on the corner of Hamilton Street and Adams Street, named for Bishop James Edwin Cassidy. However, given the economics of the time, the aging of the old Coyle High School building, and the lack of ordained staff for each school, it was decided in 1971 that the two schools would merge into Coyle-Cassidy High School in the Bishop Cassidy site. The former Monsignor Coyle High School building became known as the Taunton Catholic Middle School, and served the diocese until the 2014.

=== 21st century ===
In February 2014, the school announced that it would begin to host grades 6–8 in a new "Middle School Division", while grades 9-12 would be known as the "High School Division". This was in response to the shutting down of Taunton Catholic Middle School, which had hosted grades 5–8 in a previous Coyle location. The full name of the school was modified to include both divisions.

In the 2014–2015 school year, the school had 147 in the middle school level, and this increased to 159 in the 2015–2016 school year; Mary Pat Tranter, the president of the school, stated that she favored the middle school addition. In 2018 the 5th grade was added to Coyle and Cassidy as a result of grade realignments in Taunton; at the time a Catholic elementary there had closed.

In 2020, Coyle and Cassidy merged into Bishop Connolly High School in the wake of the COVID-19 pandemic, but Connolly did not take Coyle and Cassidy's middle school students, who were instead directed to Our Lady of Lourdes School in Taunton.

=== Post-Closure ===
In June 2021, the diocese would begin a five-year lease of the property with Bristol Community College, which rebranded it as their Taunton Center. Two years later, the diocese sold the property to the City of Taunton, which would transfer it to the Taunton Public School District the following year. As Bristol Community College's lease began nearing its end in 2025, the district chose to repurpose the space as a high-capacity middle school rather than continue its partnership.

Under Bristol Community College, the space was used as their primary venue for sports, and as their center for adult education. Shortly after leasing the space, the college would rebrand their gymansium with the school's Bayhawk branding.

== Academics and school campus ==
Coyle-Cassidy has been located at 2 Hamilton Street since 1971. In 1983, an athletic wing was added onto the existing academic wing. In 1997, a theater, tech center, new library, and two classrooms were added onto the academic wing. In 2006, the third floor of the building was remodeled into a state-of-the-art music and fine arts center. Also in 2013, Coyle-Cassidy received ownership of Our Lady of the Holy Rosary Parish, a Catholic church that is located about .25 miles away from Coyle on 80 Bay St. The parish center of the church is currently being used as an annex of Coyle-Cassidy.

The school places a heavy emphasis on technology, with most schoolwork done digitally. The school maintains two computer technology centers. Coyle-Cassidy also maintains three science labs: a physics lab, a chemistry lab, and a biology lab. The school planned to add a fourth lab, for biology, in the summer of 2013. This new lab would take the place of a former classroom. During each subsequent summer, the school was scheduled to renovate each of the three labs already in existence, as part of an effort to bolster its science program. However, with the transition to a grades 6-12 concept, major renovations took place during the summer of 2014 to update the new middle school area. This postponed each of the final three science lab projects by one year.

The school has three portable electronics carts: one for laptops, one for iPads, and one for Linux netbooks. This enables entire classes to be connected wirelessly. Students are also allowed and encouraged to use their own laptops, iPads, or other tablets for this purpose.

Beginning in the 2012–13 school year, one class in each department is conducted using iPads remotely in conjunction with the teacher and an overhead projector screen. Beginning with the 2013–2014 school year, every student at Coyle must have an iPad to use for note-taking, virtual textbooks, and other academic uses.

While the gymnasium itself was renovated in 2007, much of the athletic wing dates to its construction in 1983. The weight room was renovated in 2013 into a state-of-the-art fitness center for student athletes.

Incoming freshmen take a DFRCEC placement test. This, along with recommendations from middle school teachers, determines grade 9 class placement.

== Athletics ==
Coyle's athletic program is sanctioned by the Massachusetts Interscholastic Athletic Association (MIAA) and all of the school's teams compete in the Eastern Athletic Conference (EAC). Coyle's athletic teams play under the nickname "Warriors". The school has a long, cross-city rivalry with the Taunton High School "Tigers".

Currently, the school supports varsity teams in 16 different sports: baseball, basketball, cheerleading, cross country, American football, golf, ice hockey, indoor track, soccer, softball, swimming, tennis, track and field, volleyball, lacrosse, wrestling, and weightlifting. Most sports also consist of freshman and junior varsity teams.
