= Heribert Rech =

German lawyer and politician

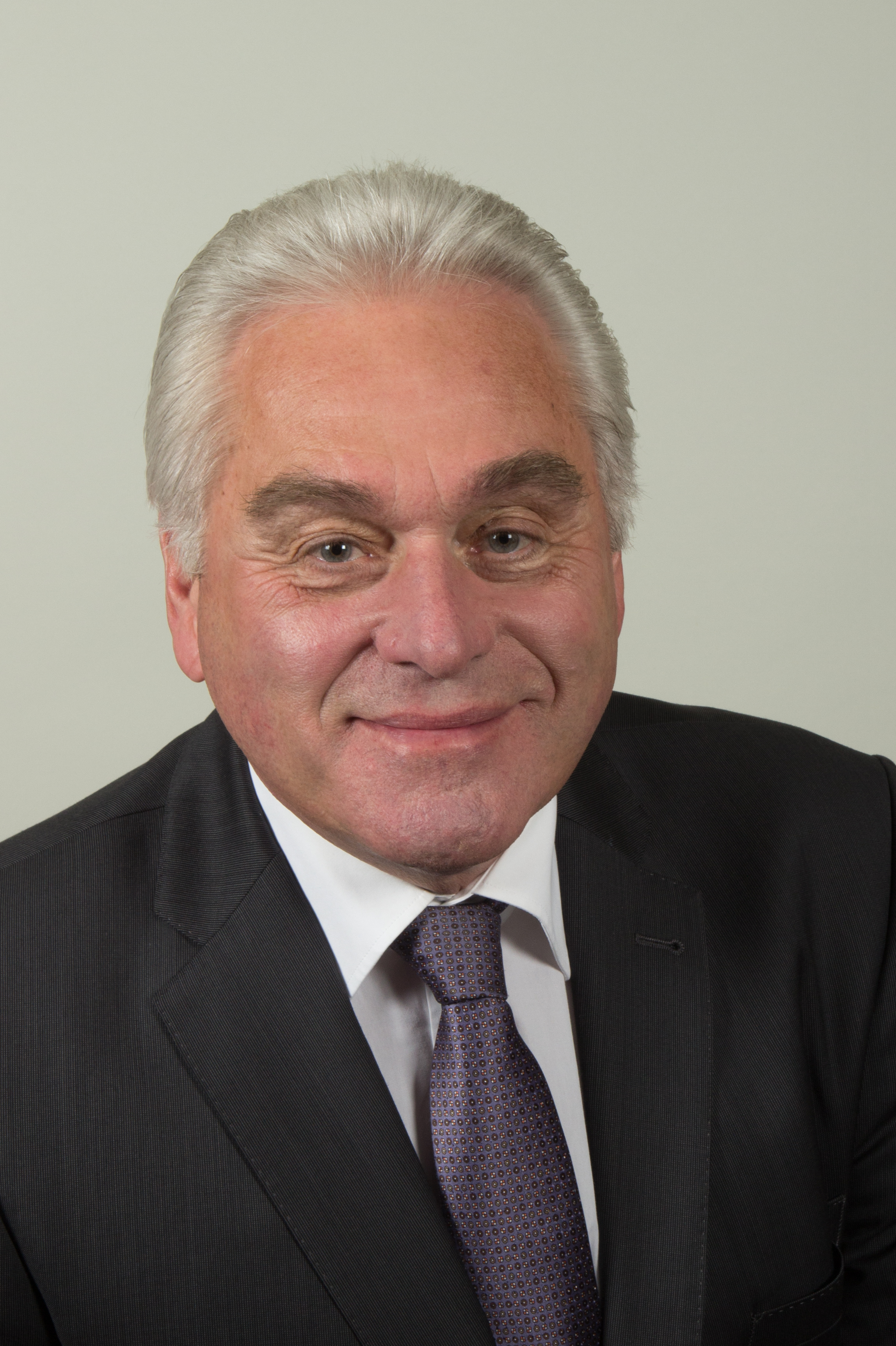
Heribert Rech, ehemaliger Minister in Baden-Württemberg

Heribert Rech (born April 25, 1950, in Östringen, Württemberg-Baden, West Germany) is a German lawyer and politician. Since 2004, he has been the Minister of the Interior in the German state of Baden-Württemberg.

Rech studied law in Heidelberg.

After riots were broken up by police, Rech denied that there was any police brutality, but if there was, they had been "confronted with a high potential for aggression" by civilians.

He is a widower and has two children.

== Books ==
Rech, Heribert. Die Nachwirkung Freiwilliger Betriebsvereinbarungen : Auswirkungen der Beendigung einer freiwilligen Betriebsvereinbarung auf darin vorgesehene Ansprueche und Anwartschaften. (German lang.). January 1997. ISBN 3-631-32107-4.

== See also ==
- Politics of Germany
