= Nova Fátima =

Municipality of Bahia, Brazil

Coordinates: 11°36′S 39°31′W

- Municipality
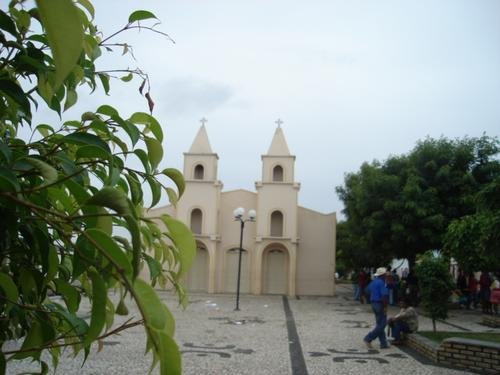

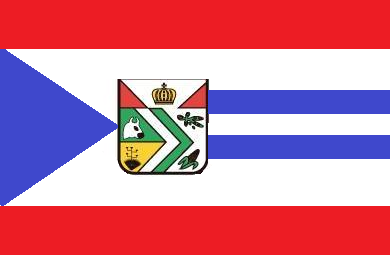
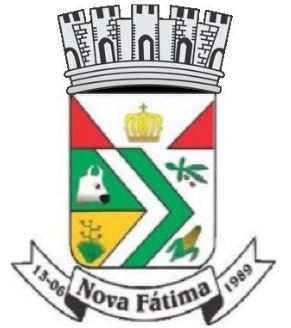
- Flag Coat of arms
- Interactive map of Nova Fátima
- Country: Brazil
- Region: Nordeste
- State: bahia

Population (2020)
  - Total: 7,821
- Time zone: UTC−3 (BRT)

Nova Fátima is a municipality in the state of Bahia in the North-East region of Brazil.

== See also ==
- List of municipalities in Bahia
