= James Gerard Kennedy Sr. =

American businessman

- Kennedy circa 1970-1980
- Born: February 7, 1907; Harlem, New York City
- Died: December 24, 1997 (aged 90); Larchmont, New York
- Occupation: Construction
- Spouses: Antoinette Granato (m. 1940–1942): Rita Massert
- Parent(s): James Joseph Kennedy (1866-1926); Katherine Carr (1865-1951)

James Gerard Kennedy Sr. (February 7, 1907 – December 24, 1997) a.k.a. James G. Kennedy, was the founder, president, and chairman of James G. Kennedy & Company, Inc. in New York City.

== Biography ==
James was born in 1907 in Harlem, New York City, the son of James Joseph Kennedy (1866–1926), a plasterer, and Katherine Carr (1865–1951). Both were immigrants from Ireland. His siblings include: Kathryn Kennedy (1897–1974) a.k.a. Sis Kennedy, who married Joseph O'Malley (1893–1985) who was the uncle of Walter Francis O'Malley (1903–1979), the owner of the Brooklyn Dodgers from 1950 to 1979; Mary Frances Kennedy (1898–1982); Josephine Kennedy (1899–1900) a.k.a. Sarah Kennedy; Thomas Kennedy (1901–1972); James Gerard Kennedy I (1902–1903); and Joseph Kennedy (1905–1983). In 1920 the family was living at West 160th Street in Manhattan.

He attended Townsend Harris High School and graduated in three years. He attended the Mechanical Institute in New York City. He then worked as a plasterer, as did his father. In 1935 he founded the eponymous James G. Kennedy & Co., Inc. He served during World War II with the Army Corps of Engineers. His first major renovation project was for Bankers Trust company for their building at 14 Wall Street.

He married Antoinette Granato (1916–1942) around 1940 and she died of cancer in 1942 after being hospitalized for 2 months. In 1991 his company began reconstruction of the Fifth Avenue headquarters of the American Irish Historical Society.

== Death ==
James died on December 24, 1997, in Larchmont, New York.
