= Diocese of Fall River =

Latin Catholic jurisdiction in the US

Diocese of Fall River Dioecesis Riverormenensis

Catholic
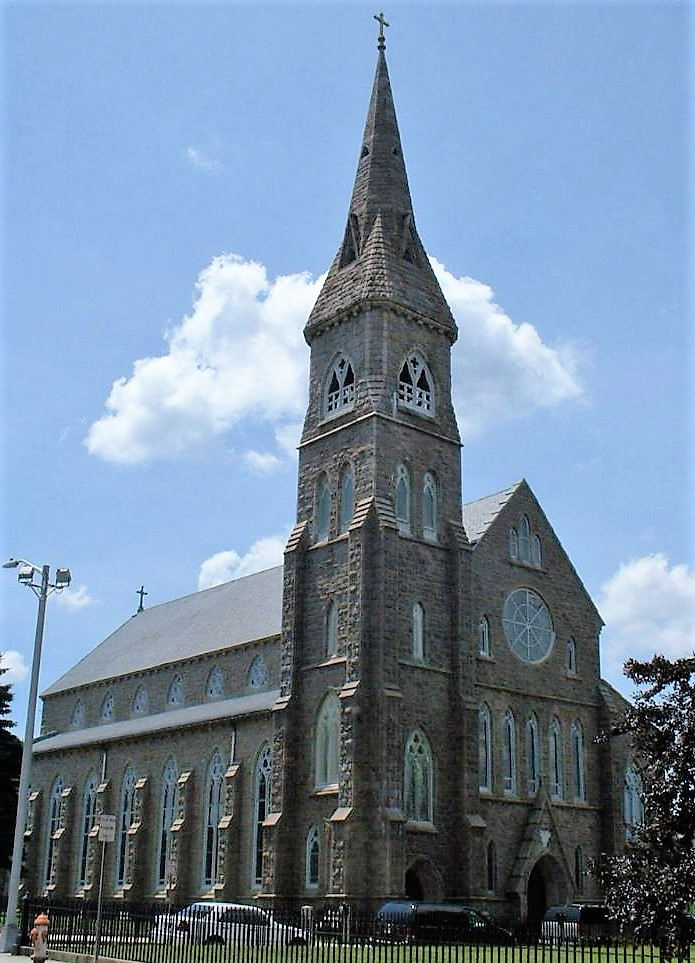
- Cathedral of St. Mary of the Assumption

- Coat of arms

Location
- Country: United States
- Territory: Massachusetts counties of Barnstable, Bristol, Dukes, Nantucket, and the towns of Marion, Mattapoisett, and Wareham on the south coast of Plymouth County
- Episcopal conference: United States Conference of Catholic Bishops
- Ecclesiastical region: Region I
- Ecclesiastical province: Boston
- Metropolitan: Boston
- Coordinates: 41°42′39″N 71°08′50″W

Statistics
- Area: 3,107 km^{2} (1,200 sq mi)
- Population: Total; Catholics: (as of 2021); 825,540 (Note: Annuario Pontificio (2022) via Catholic-Hierarchy.org); 275,290 (33.3%)
- Parishes: 78

Information
- Denomination: Catholic
- Sui iuris church: Latin Church
- Rite: Roman Rite
- Established: March 12, 1904
- Cathedral: Cathedral of St. Mary of the Assumption
- Patron saint: Saint Mary of the Assumption
- Secular priests: 123 plus 63 religious priests

Current leadership
- Pope: Leo XIV
- Bishop: Edgar Moreira da Cunha
- Metropolitan Archbishop: Richard Henning

Map
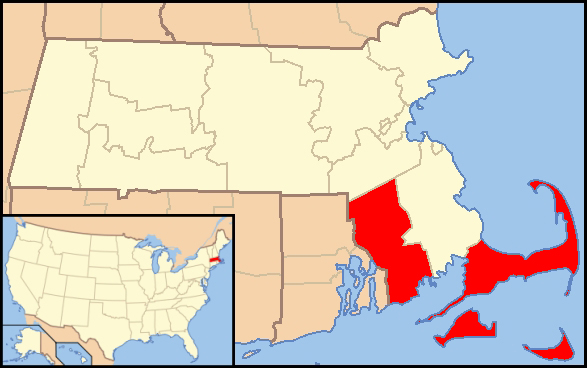

Website
- www.fallriverdiocese.org

The Diocese of Fall River (Latin: Dioecesis Riverormensis) is a diocese of the Catholic Church in southeastern Massachusetts in the United States. It is a suffragan diocese of the metropolitan Archdiocese of Boston. The mother church is St. Mary's Cathedral in Fall River. The bishop is Edgar Moreira da Cunha.

== Diocesan statistics ==
The Diocese of Fall River spans Barnstable, Bristol, Dukes, and Nantucket Counties. It also includes the towns of Marion, Mattapoisett, and Wareham along the coast of Plymouth County. The diocese covers Cape Cod and the islands of Martha's Vineyard and Nantucket.

== History ==
=== 1700 to 1808 ===
Before the American Revolution, the British Province of Massachusetts Bay, which included southern Massachusetts and Cape Cod, had enacted laws prohibiting the practice of Catholicism in the colony. It was even illegal for a priest to reside there. To gain the support of Massachusetts Catholics to fight against the British, revolutionary leaders were forced to enact religious freedom for Catholics in 1780.

After the Revolution ended in 1783, Pope Pius VI erected in 1784 the Prefecture Apostolic of the United States, encompassing the entire territory of the new nation. Pius VI created the Diocese of Baltimore, the first diocese in the United States, to replace the prefecture apostolic in 1789.

=== 1808 to 1900 ===
Pope Pius VII erected the Diocese of Boston on April 8, 1808, including all of New England in its jurisdiction. Bishop Jean-Louis de Cheverus of Boston established St Lawrence's Church, the first Catholic church in New Bedford in 1821,with the assistance of Portuguese sailors and Irish laborers. The first Catholic church on Cape Cod was St. Peter's, constructed in Sandwich in 1830. Fall River received it first Catholic church in 1837 when St. John the Baptist was completed. In 1869, the first Portuguese language parish in the country was erected in Fall River.

The Diocese of Providence was erected by Pope Pius IX on February 17, 1872. The pope removed the counties of Bristol, Barnstable, Dukes and Nantucket in Massachusetts from the Archdiocese of Boston.The present day Diocese of Fall River area would remain part of the Diocese of Providence for the next 32 years.

=== 1900 to 1950 ===
Pope Pius X erected the Diocese of Fall River on March 12, 1904. He took all of the Massachusetts counties from Diocese of Providence for the new diocese, making it a suffragan of the Archdiocese of Boston. William Stang of Providence was the first bishop. At the time of his appointment, the new diocese had 44 parishes serving 130,000 Catholics.

On May 8, 1904, St. Mary's Cathedral was packed with worshipers for Stang's first mass, with police detachments controlling the crowd, estimated at 25,000 people, on the street outside the building. During his tenure, Stang established eleven parishes and founded Saint Anne's Hospital in Fall River. One of the new parishes was St. Boniface, a German parish in New Bedford.

After Stang's death in 1907, Pius X appointed Daniel Feehan from the Diocese of Springfield in Massachusetts as the second bishop of Fall River that same year. During his 27-year tenure, Feehan established 36 parishes. To assist Feehan, Pope Pius IX named Auxiliary Bishop James Cassidy of Providence as coadjutor bishop of the diocese in 1934. Feehan died in office later that year and Cassidy automatically succeeded him as bishop. Bishop Feehan High School in Attleboro was named in his honor.

=== 1950 to 1970 ===
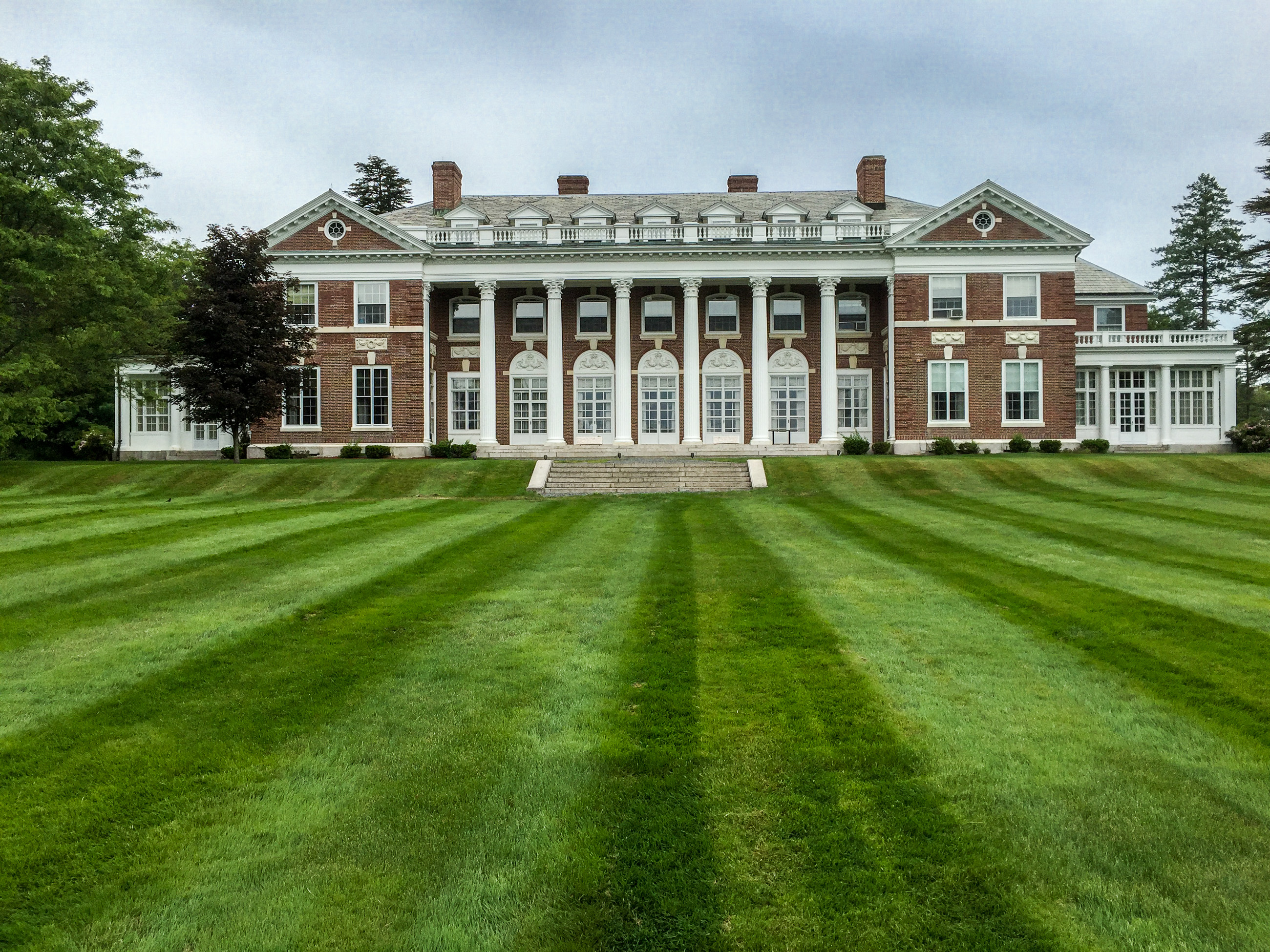
Stonehill College, Easton, Massachusetts (2006)

As bishop, Cassidy founded several homes for senior citizens. In 1945, Pope Pius XII appointed James Connolly of the Archdiocese of Saint Paul to serve as coadjutor bishop to assist Cassidy. In 1948, the Congregation of Holy Cross founded Stonehill College in Easton. In early 1951, Cassidy published a pastoral letter forbidding girls cheerleading at Catholic high schools in the diocese, citing what he termed the indecency of their outfits. He also banned football games at night.

Following Cassidy's death in 1951, Connolly automatically became the new bishop. Bishop Cassidy High School in Taunton, later renamed Coyle and Cassidy High School following its merger with the all-male Monsignor Coyle High School, was named in Cassidy's honor. As bishop, one of Connolly's special concerns was with providing secondary education in the four urban areas of the diocese. He constructed four Catholic high schools during his tenure. Bishop Connolly High School was dedicated to him in 1967. He also founded the diocesan newspaper, The Anchor.

=== 1970 to 2002 ===
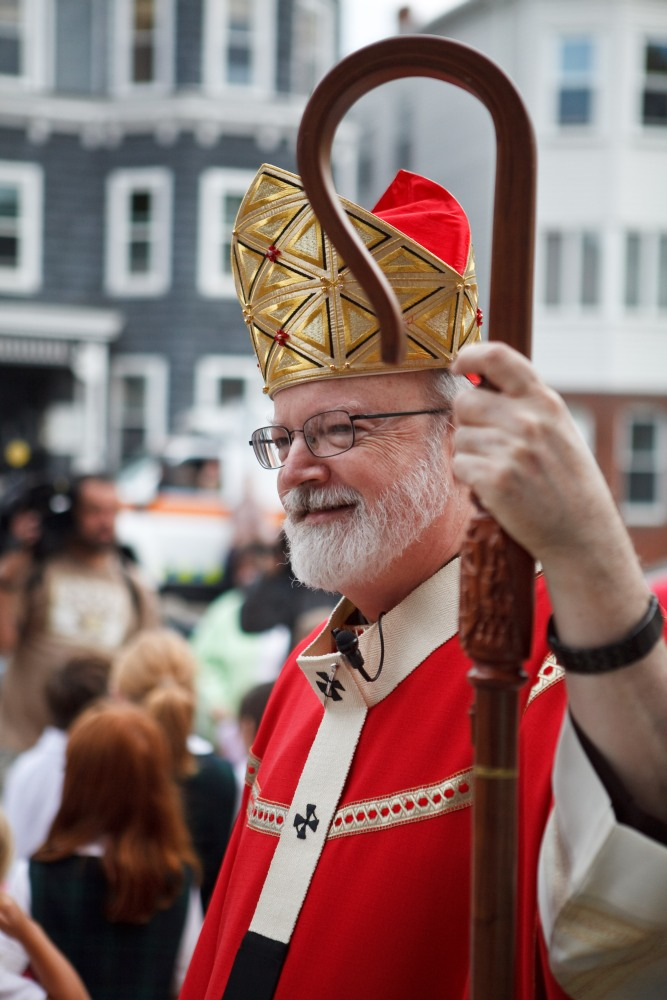
Cardinal O'Malley (2009)

After Connolly retired in 1970, Pope Paul VI appointed Auxiliary Bishop Daniel Cronin of Boston as the fifth bishop of Fall River. Cronin continued the work of implementing the decrees of the Second Vatican Council of the early 1960s. He supported liturgical renewal, continuing education of the clergy and the restoration of the permanent diaconate. Cronin expanded the Catholic Counseling and Social Services as well as the Family Life Ministry. Late in 1991, Pope John Paul II appointed Cronin as archbishop of the Archdiocese of Hartford.

To replace Cronin, John Paul II appointed Bishop Seán O'Malley of the Diocese of St. Thomas in 1992 as the new bishop of Fall River. He established an office for AIDS Ministry and two new residences for women and reorganized the diocesan administration. O’Malley created the Office of Pastoral Planning to assist him on merging parishes and assigning priests.

=== 2002 to present ===
In 2002, John Paul II named O'Malley as bishop of the Diocese of Palm Beach and appointed George Coleman of Fall River as his successor. In March 2005, Bernard Kelly, pastor of St. Joseph's Church in Barnstable, was indicted on embezzlement and filing false tax returns. He was accused of stealing over $500,000 from his church. In May 2005, the diocese settled a lawsuit against Kelly for $1.3 million.Kelly pleaded guilty in 2006 and was sentenced to seven years of probation.

In 2007, Coleman dedicated Pope John Paul II High School in Hyannis, the first Catholic high school on Cape Cod. He also created a directorship of Faith Formation, a youth ministry and a marriage and family ministry. Coleman retired as bishop of Fall River in 2014.

On July 3, 2014, Pope Francis appointed Auxiliary Bishop Edgar Moreira da Cunha from the Archdiocese of Newark as the eighth bishop of Fall River. The diocese in May 2025 announced the closure of five parishes due to the shortage of priests:

- St. Francis of Assisi Parish in New Bedford
- St. Theresa of the Child Jesus Parish in Attleboro
- Our Lady of Grace, St. George, and St. John the Baptist Parishes in Westport

As of 2026, Da Cunha is the current bishop of Fall River.

=== Sexual abuse ===
In the early 1990s, revelations surfaced about how the Diocese of Fall River protected the priest James Porter from charges of sexual abuse between 1960 and 1964. In 1960, the priest had been assigned to St. Mary's grammar school. Parents soon started filing complaints against him with the diocese. The diocese took no action until 1963; by that time, at least four parents had complained. The diocese then moved Porter to a parish in Fall River without notifying police or the new parish about the allegations. More complaints were made against Porter. In 1964, he was arrested on sex abuse charges. He was then sent for inpatient hospital treatment. He left the priesthood in 1974 and started a family. He was arrested several times in the following years and served multiple prison terms. He died in prison in 2005.

A lawsuit was filed in 2014 against Archbishop Cronin of Hartford by two men who claimed they were sexually abused as minors by Maurice Souza, a priest in East Falmouth. The plaintiffs claimed that Cronin, then bishop of Fall River, failed to properly supervise Souza, who allegedly molested the boys during the 1980s in East Falmouth and on athletic trips out of town. In January 2019, Cronin and the two men reached a settlement, with each man to receive $200,000.

In December 2020, a grand jury at Barnstable Superior Court indicted Mark R. Hession, a diocesan priest, on two counts of rape, one count of indecent assault and battery on a child under age 14, and one count of intimidation of a witness. Hession had worked closely with the Kennedy family and delivered the homily at Senator Ted Kennedy's funeral in 2009. The diocese in January 2021 released a list of 75 priests with credible accusations of sexual abuse, going back to 1904.

The diocese in May 2023 settled a lawsuit brought by Jason Medeiros. Three years early, Medeiros had alleged that the priest Richard DeGagne had sexually assaulted him when he was 12 and 13 years old in the 1980s at St. Anthony of Padua Parish in New Bedford. The diocese suspended DeGagne from his priestly duties in 2019.

The diocese in May 2025 removed Jay Mello as pastor of Saint Michael's and Saint Joseph's Parishes and suspended him from ministry. This was due to two credible allegations of sexual abuse from 2011.

== Bishops ==
=== Bishops of Fall River ===
1. William Stang (1904–1907)
2. Daniel Francis Feehan (1907–1934)
3. James Edwin Cassidy (1934–1951; coadjutor bishop 1934)
4. James Louis Connolly (1951–1970; coadjutor bishop 1945–1951)
5. Daniel Anthony Cronin (1970–1992), appointed Archbishop of Hartford
6. Seán Patrick O'Malley (1992–2002), appointed Bishop of Palm Beach and later Archbishop of Boston (created Cardinal in 2006)
7. George William Coleman (2003–2014)
8. Edgar Moreira da Cunha (2014–present)

=== Auxiliary Bishops of Fall River ===
- James Edwin Cassidy (1930–1934), appointed Coadjutor Bishop of Fall River (see above)
- James Joseph Gerrard (1959–1976)

=== Other diocesan priests who became bishops ===
- John Edward Morris (priest here, 1914–1921), appointed Prefect of Peng-Yang in 1930
- William Otterwell Brady, appointed Bishop of Sioux Falls in 1939
- Humberto Sousa Medeiros, appointed Bishop of Brownsville in 1966 and Archbishop of Boston in 1970; future Cardinal
- Joseph Patrick Delaney (priest here, 1960–1971), appointed Bishop of Fort Worth in 1981

== Education ==
=== Schools ===
- Bishop Feehan High School – Attleboro
- Bishop Stang High School – Dartmouth
- Saint John Paul II School – Hyannis

=== Colleges ===
Stonehill College – Easton

== Landmarks ==
In addition to St. Mary's Cathedral, two other major churches in the diocese are St. Anthony of Padua in New Bedford, Santo Christo Church and Shrine, and St. Anne's both in Fall River.

The Diocese of Fall River is also home to the National Shrine of Our Lady of La Salette, owned and operated by the Missionaries of Our Lady of La Salette.
