= Bishop Connolly High School =

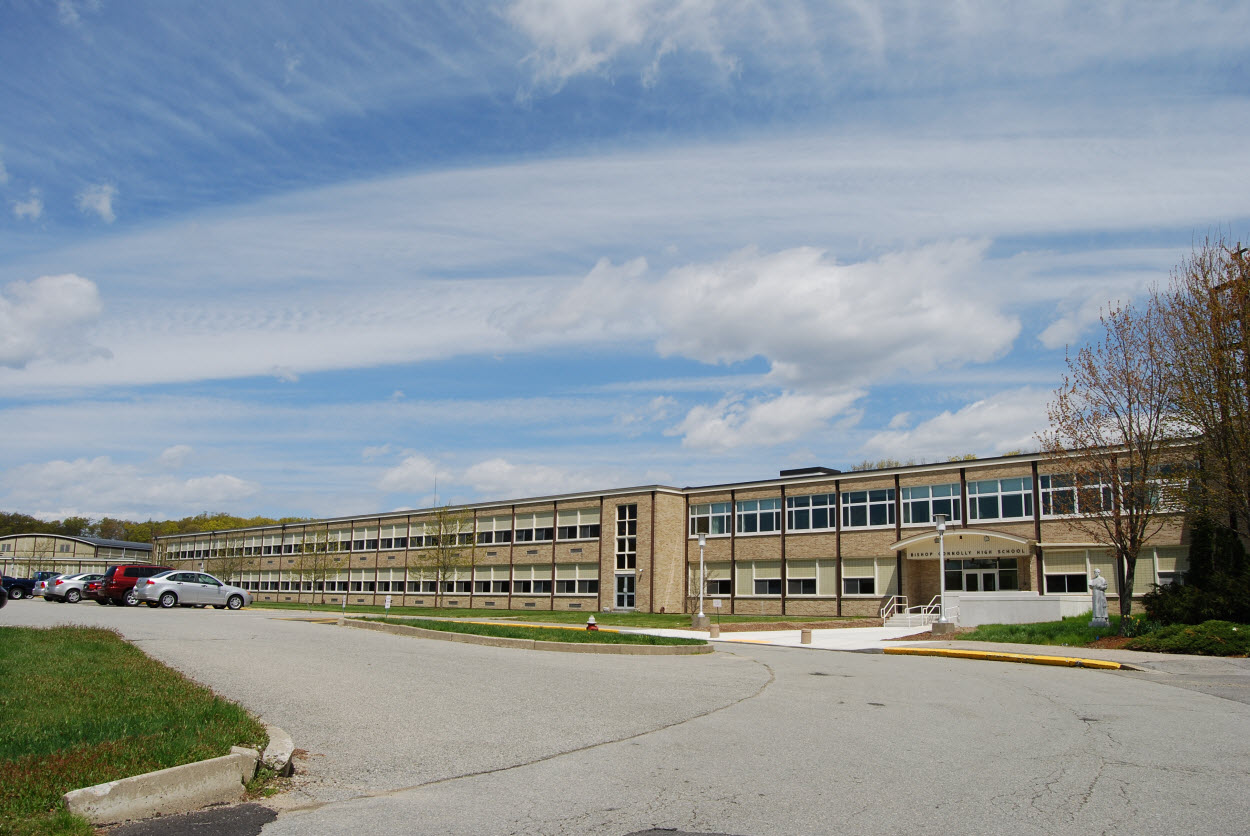

Location
- 373 Elsbree Street; Fall River, (Bristol County), Massachusetts 02720; United States; 41°42′55″N 71°7′16″W

Information
- Type: Private, Coeducational
- Motto: Non auditores tantum, sed factores verbi ("Not only hearers, but doers of the word" (from James 1:22))
- Religious affiliation: Roman Catholic
- Established: 1966
- Closed: 2023
- President: E. Christopher Myron (c. 2010-c. 2020)
- Principal: E. Christopher Myron (c. 2010-2019), Kathleen St. Laurent (2019-2023)
- Chaplain: Fr. Christopher M Peschel (2019-2022), Fr. Riley Williams (2022-2023)
- Grades: 9–12
- Campus: Suburban
- Colors: Red, White and Gold
- Athletics conference: Mayflower
- Team name: Cougars
- Accreditation: New England Association of Schools and Colleges
- Tuition: $11,000
- Website: www.bishopconnolly.com

Bishop Connolly High School was a co-educational Catholic high school in Fall River, Massachusetts.

== History ==
Connolly began operations as an all-boys Catholic high school in September 1966, operating from a different building, before moving into its Elsbree Street facility the next year; Connolly would stay there for the rest of the school's existence. The school would later become co-ed starting in the 1980-81 school year.

In 2020 Connolly took the high school students from Coyle And Cassidy School, which closed due to the COVID-19 pandemic.

Citing a decline in enrollment and financial strain due to the pandemic, the school closed following the end of the 2022-23 school year. The last day of class was on June 9, 2023; Connolly officially closed on June 30.

== Campus and building ==
Connolly's campus was approximately 60 acres (240,000 m^{2}). The campus was adjacent to Bristol Community College and B.M.C Durfee High School; Fall River's public high school is located directly across Elsbree Street. The campus contained a football field with bleachers and a concession stand, a soccer field, an outdoor non-rubber track, six tennis courts, a baseball field, a softball field and several practice fields.

The main school building was composed of three sections. The activities section contained a 1000-seat gymnasium, an 800-seat auditorium, and a 200-seat cafeteria at the far west end. The middle academic wing contained the classrooms and most offices. At the far east end is the former faculty house, which became the Cardinal Medeiros residence, a retirement home for diocesan priests. The library was located in a circular building in back of the main building and was renamed the "Academic Achievement Center" in 2012.

== Academics ==
From the 2013–2014 school year up until its closing in 2023, Bishop Connolly divided its curriculum into three departments: Humanities (English, History, Foreign Language, Religion), Math & Science, and Fine Arts/Athletics, each headed by one of three academic deans. Aside from college preparatory classes, Connolly also had extensive honors and Advanced Placement offerings, including Calculus AB/BC, Biology, Chemistry, English Literature, and US History. The average class size is 22–25 students. Honors sections averages 15–18 students, while AP courses tended to number 8–11 students or fewer.

Bishop Connolly High School was accredited by the New England Association of Schools and Colleges.

== Athletics ==
Connolly offered 23 different interscholastic sports for boys and girls and 38 separate teams throughout the year. Connolly was a member of The Massachusetts Interscholastic Athletic Associations's Mayflower League. The athletic squads were called the Cougars.

In 1993, the hockey program became the first Southeastern Massachusetts school to win a state championship. The Cougars have also won state championships in baseball (1990) and boys' tennis (1992)

On March 13, 2013, the boys' varsity basketball team won the Division IV State Championship at the TD Garden in Boston, MA. Bishop Connolly was recognized by Fall River Mayor William Flanagan and numerous state representatives.

Athletic Accomplishments

- Boys' Basketball - State Champions (2013)
- Boys' Hockey - State Champions (1993)

== Notable alumni ==
- Jasiel Correira (1991- ), former mayor of Fall River
- David Gauvin, amateur boxer
- Bob Tavares, ASCAP songwriter
