= Bishop Stang High School =

School in North Dartmouth, Massachusetts, United States

Location
- 500 Slocum Road; North Dartmouth, (Bristol County), Massachusetts 02747; United States; 41.636566°N 70.967860°W

Information
- Type: Private coed. high school
- Religious affiliation: Roman Catholic
- Established: 1959
- President: James Benson
- Chaplain: FR. Laurent Valliere
- Grades: 9–12
- Enrollment: 551
- Colors: Maroon & Gray
- Athletics conference: Catholic Central League
- Mascot: Spartans ("Sparty")
- Team name: Spartans
- Rival: Dartmouth, Bishop Feehan
- Accreditation: New England Association of Schools and Colleges
- Publication: ETHOS (literary arts magazine)
- Newspaper: Spartan Script
- Yearbook: The Torch
- Vice Principal of Academics: Daniel Dias
- Vice Principal of Student Affairs: Amy G Rodgers
- Athletic Director: Nate Greene
- Website: www.bishopstang.org

Bishop Stang High School is a private Catholic high school located in North Dartmouth, Massachusetts, in the New England region of the United States. It was the first diocesan secondary school in the Roman Catholic Diocese of Fall River, which includes the South Coast Massachusetts, including Cape Cod and the islands of Martha's Vineyard and Nantucket. The school is named after William Stang, the first bishop of the Diocese of Fall River, and has been coeducational since its founding.

== Location ==
It is located in the suburban town of Dartmouth, on the South Coast of Massachusetts. Stang's 8-acre (32,000 m^{2}) campus is 25 minutes west of Cape Cod and 20 minutes east of the Rhode Island border. Its 500-plus student body draws from more than 50 cities and towns in Massachusetts and Rhode Island.

Catholic secondary education in southeastern Massachusetts began in the early 20th century with local parochial schools affiliated with various Catholic parishes. Some of these, such as the now-closed Holy Family High School, located near St. Lawrence Church in New Bedford, had strong academic reputations and produced generations of prominent Catholic alumni in the region. While Stang was not the first Catholic secondary school in southeastern Massachusetts, it was the first regional, diocesan, coeducational institution. Founded in 1959, Stang's original faculty included Sisters of Notre Dame de Namur in full religious habit. The new 8-acre (32,000 m^{2}) campus across from the Country Club of New Bedford in then-pastoral Dartmouth drew students from cities and towns in a 60-mile (97 km) radius from Rhode Island to Cape Cod. In the years following the Second Vatican Council, the number of Sisters of Notre Dame decreased. By the 1970s the vast majority of faculty and administrators were lay men and women, and the remaining sisters dressed conservatively, but in lay clothing. Since its inception, Stang has had a large number of alumni return as teachers and administrators.

== Academics ==
Advanced placement courses at Bishop Stang are offered in Biology, Chemistry, Physics 1 and Physics 2, Calculus A/B, Calculus B/C, Statistics, Computer Science, English Language & Composition, English Literature, Psychology, United States History, Studio Art, and European History.

== Athletics and activities ==
Bishop Stang offers over 47 varsity, junior varsity, and freshman interscholastic sports teams including 27 varsity athletic teams and 19 sub-varsity teams. The school offers more than 25 co-curricular activities. Bishop Stang's athletic teams have historically been successful in both men's and women's sports.
