= Cathedral of St. Mary of the Assumption (Fall River, Massachusetts) =

Historic church in Massachusetts, United States

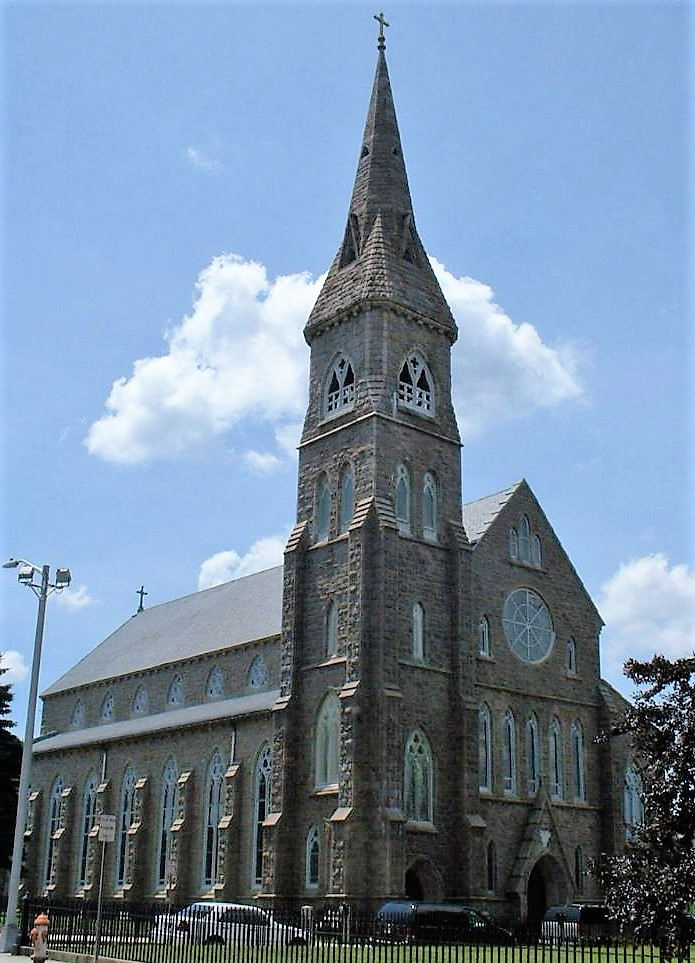
- Cathedral of St. Mary of the Assumption
- 41°41′55″N 71°9′28″W
- Location: 327 Second Street; Fall River, Massachusetts
- Country: United States
- Denomination: Roman Catholic Church

History
- Status: Cathedral
- Dedicated: 1855

Architecture
- Functional status: Active
- Heritage designation: NRHP
- Designated: 1983
- Architect(s): Patrick Keely (cathedral); Maginnis & Walsh (rectory)
- Style: Gothic Revival
- Groundbreaking: August 8, 1852

Specifications
- Length: 126 feet (38 m)
- Width: 76 feet (23 m)
- Height: 90 feet (27 m)

Administration
- Diocese: Fall River

Clergy
- Bishop(s): Most Reverend Edgar Moreira da Cunha, S.D.V.
- Rector: Rev. David C. Frederici
- St. Mary's Cathedral and Rectory
- U.S. National Register of Historic Places
- MPS: Fall River MRA
- NRHP reference No.: 83000723
- Added to NRHP: February 16, 1983

The Cathedral of Saint Mary of the Assumption, colloquially known as Saint Mary's Cathedral, is a historic church located in Fall River, Massachusetts. It is the cathedral and a parish church in the Diocese of Fall River. Built from 1852 to 1856, the cathedral and adjacent rectory were added to the National Register of Historic Places in 1983, as St. Mary's Cathedral and Rectory. It is the oldest extant church building in the city of Fall River, and was one of the city's first Catholic parishes. The cathedral is dedicated to Mary, mother of Jesus under the title of Our Lady of the Assumption.

== History ==
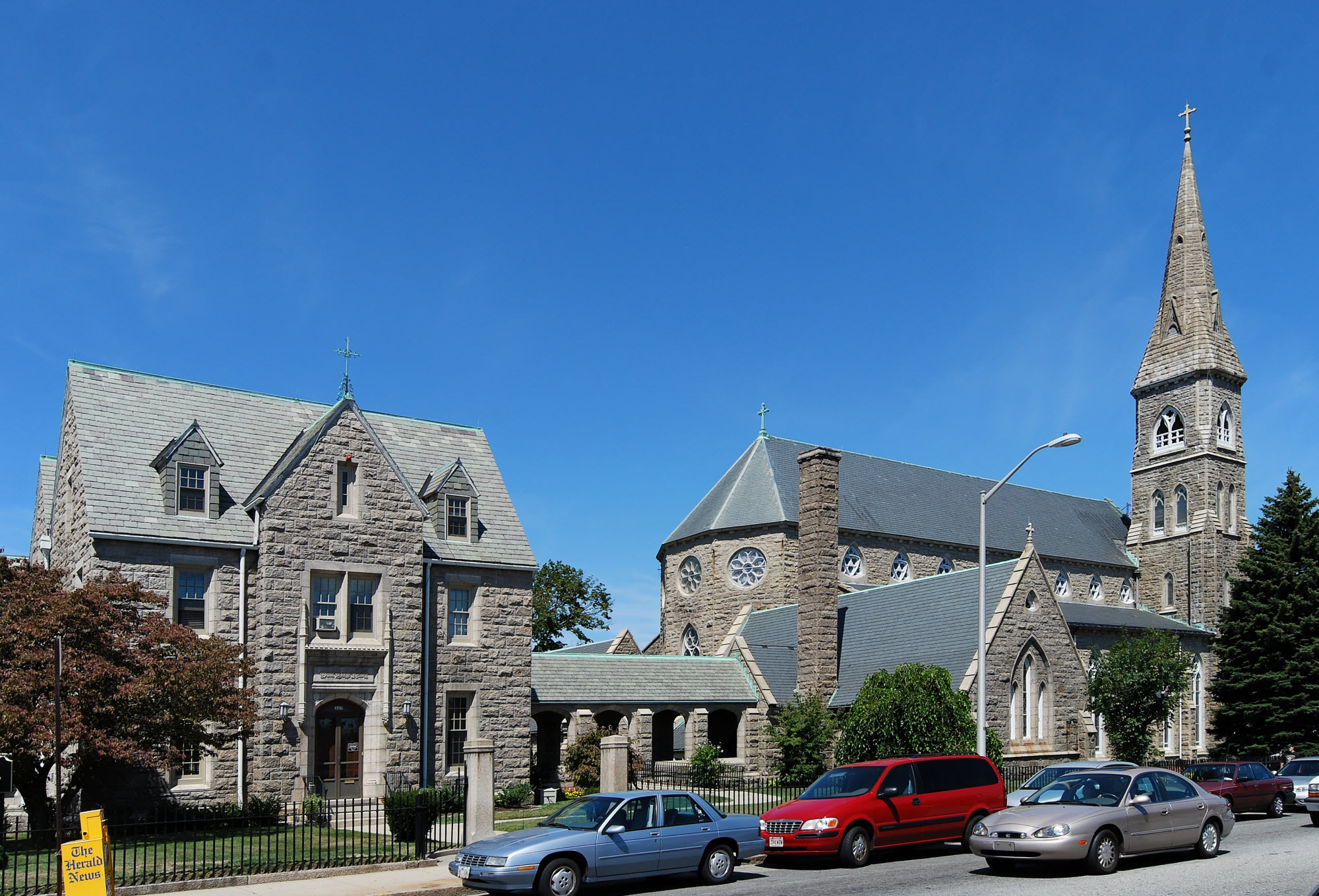
The rectory (left) and cathedral (right).

There were not enough Catholics in Fall River in the early 19th century to form a parish, so they were visited occasionally by a visiting priest. Property was finally acquired in 1835 from Peter McLarrin for $659. The parish of St. John the Baptist was established in 1838 and a small frame church building was constructed. Large numbers of Irish immigrants came to Fall River in the 1840s to work in the mills and they soon overwhelmed the small church.

Bishop John Fitzpatrick of the Diocese of Boston, which covered all of the State of Massachusetts at the time, laid the cornerstone for the present church on August 8, 1852, at the site of St. John the Baptist Church. The old church remained in place and continued in use while the new church was built around it. When it was time to put on the roof, the old church was dismantled and rebuilt in a near-by location. Parishioners helped in the construction of their new church. Bishop Fitzpatrick returned to dedicate the new St. Mary's Church on December 16, 1855. Finishing details were not completed until December of the following year, and the steeple was unfinished until 1858. In 1872, St. Mary's became a parish in the newly created Diocese of Providence. In 1901, Bishop Matthew Harkins of Providence consecrated the sanctuary, and in 1904 Pope Pius X named it the cathedral church of the newly founded Diocese of Fall River, its seat first held by Bishop William Stang.

Two chapels flank the cathedral. The Lady Chapel was completed in 1869. The Blessed Sacrament is reserved there and it has the daily Mass. The Bishop's Chapel was completed in 1935. It is dedicated to Saints John Fisher and Thomas More. Four bishops of Fall River are buried in the chapel's crypt. The cathedral has been renovated five times: 1890–1891, 1912–1913, 1951, 1978–79, and 2000.

The rectory and diocesan offices are attached to the rear of the cathedral by a colonnade. The original rectory was a Stick style residence. It was replaced in 1927 by the current rectory.

The cathedral is one of several grand Catholic churches built in the city during its heyday as an industrial center, including St. Anne Shrine, Good Shepherd Church (formerly Saint Patrick's), Sacred Heart Church, Espirito Santo, and Saint Joseph's Church, as well as several that have since been lost, including St. Matthieu's in the North End (taken by eminent domain in the 1960s) and Notre Dame de Lourdes in the Flint, which was destroyed in one of the city's most famous conflagrations on May 11, 1982.

== Architecture ==
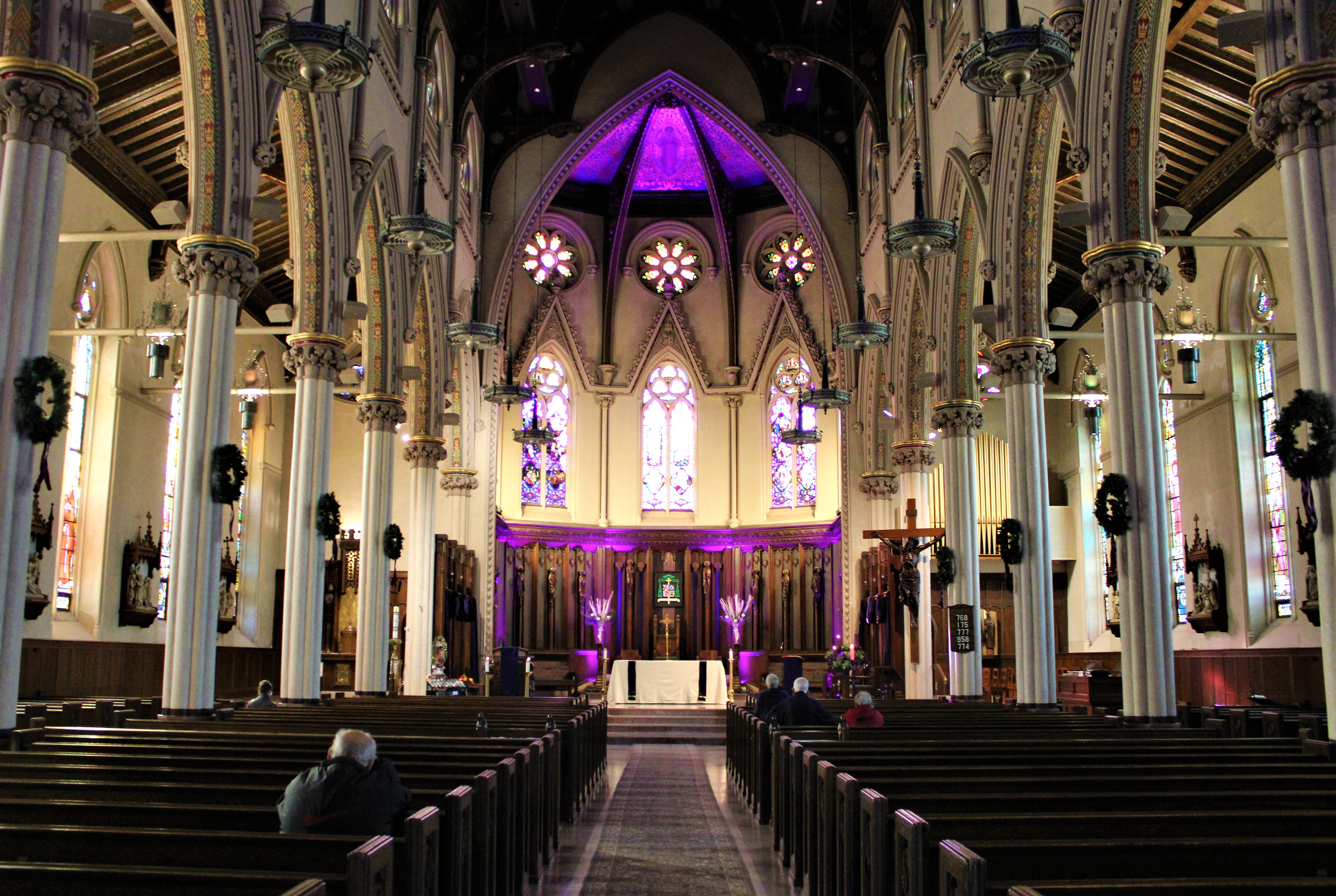
Cathedral interior

St. Mary's Cathedral was designed by prominent Brooklyn, New York church architect Patrick Keely in an “Early English” mode of the Gothic Revival style. He later designed St. Joseph (1880) and St. Patrick (1881–1889) churches in Fall River. The cathedral and the entire steeple are stonework composed of native granite. The naves are covered by a shingled roof. The building measures 126 by 76 feet (38 by 23 m) and the spire rises to a height of 190 feet (58 m). The main entrance is set in a shallow gabled frontispiece. Above it on the main facade is a rose window in the main gable.

The interior includes intricate woodwork, with some gilding above the sanctuary. The structure is divided into three naves by granite columns. The central nave rises above the side naves that flank it forming a clerestory that is lined with windows. It is capped by a hammer-beam ceiling that rises 90 feet (27 m) above the floor. The oldest of the stained glass windows are located in the nave. They were created in Germany and installed in 1891. The chancel widows were created in Brooklyn and installed in 1915. The Lancet windows in the rear gallery were created in Boston and installed in 1952.

The rectory was designed by the Boston architectural firm of Maginnis & Walsh. Like the cathedral, it was designed in the Gothic Revival style and its exterior is clad in granite.

== Organs ==
=== Original organ ===
The first organ of St. Mary's Cathedral was built in 1952 by George Kilgen & Son of St. Louis Missouri. Designed by Charles Chadwick, it was built as opus 4309 and had 33 ranks, and 2,166 pipes. Two identical cases were built in the rear of the cathedral with the organ console being placed in the choir loft. The console had 3 manuals with drawknob stops. A chamber was added to the north side of the cathedral to house the swell division. After many years of use, the pipe organ was placed in storage with hopes someday the instrument could serve as the basis for a larger organ. It was replaced with a 3 manual Allen Organ, the speakers for it being placed in the pipe organ case(s).

=== Current organ ===
The current organ of St. Mary's Cathedral was built in 2015 by the Peragallo Pipe Organ Company of New Jersey. The instrument is a combination of two organs, the original Kilgen from 1952, and the organ of Sacred Heart Church. Sacred Heart Church closed in 2014 and housed an 1883 E. and G.G. Hook and Hastings Co. organ. The instrument was built in Boston and later renovated by Peragallo. The new cathedral organ combines both of these instruments and their parts. The new organ was built for $179,350. and has many features the original organ did not have. The organ has an electronic choir division which is played from the right side of the altar. The console also has three manuals, two of which are from the Hook and Hastings instrument. The organ can be heard at the cathedral during weekend masses.

== See also ==
- List of Catholic cathedrals in the United States
- Cathedrals in the United States
- National Register of Historic Places listings in Fall River, Massachusetts
