= Bishop Feehan High School =

Location
- 70 Holcott Drive; North Attleboro, (Bristol County), Massachusetts 02703; United States; 41°57′51″N 71°17′42″W

Information
- Type: Private
- Religious affiliation: Roman Catholic
- Established: 1961
- President: Tim Sullivan '87
- Principal: Sean Kane
- Chaplain: Craig Pregana
- Faculty: 121
- Grades: 9–12
- Gender: Coeducational
- Enrollment: 1095 (2022)
- Average class size: 18
- Student to teacher ratio: 13:1
- Campus size: 42 acres
- Colors: Green; Gold; White
- Slogan: “Set your hearts on things above and not on things of earth.” ~ Colossians 3:2
- Athletics conference: Catholic Central League
- Mascot: Lucky the Leprechaun
- Team name: Shamrocks
- Rival: Attleboro High School North Attleboro High School Bishop Stang High School
- Accreditation: New England Association of Schools and Colleges
- Publication: "Cornerstone" (alumni magazine)
- Newspaper: The ‘Rock Report
- Yearbook: Flashback
- Tuition: $12,900 yearly
- Website: www.bishopfeehan.com

Bishop Feehan High School is a co-educational Catholic high school in Attleboro, Massachusetts. It is located in the Roman Catholic Diocese of Fall River. The school was built in 1961 and staffed by the Sisters of Mercy. The school has grown to over 1,000 students. Each class is approximately 250+ students, who are selected from a significantly larger pool of applicants.

The second of five regional, diocesan Catholic high schools constructed in the Diocese of Fall River, the school opened in the fall of 1961.

== Academics ==
Feehan offers 17 AP classes and honors courses in mathematics, foreign languages, English, science and the arts.

100% of Feehan most recent graduating class was accepted to a four-year institution and 98% enrolled at a four-year institution.

== Athletics ==
The athletic activities include football, marching band, ice hockey, cheerleading, volleyball, cross country, basketball, track, soccer, baseball, swim, lacrosse, water polo, fencing, and some others.

In 2026, Brody Bumila a player for both the basketball and baseball teams at Bishop Feehan was drafted by the Texas Rangers in the third round with the 89th pick in the Major League Baseball Draft. He will receive over $3 million in a signing bonus to join the organization.

== Notable athletic alumni ==
- Mark Schmidt (1981): Head Coach of Men's Basketball at St. Bonaventure University
- Mark Coogan (1984): Decorated track athlete, former collegiate track star at University of Maryland, and member of the 1996 U.S. Olympic team.
- Jim Renner (2001): Professional golfer
