= Cristiano Borro Barbosa =

Brazilian Catholic prelate in the United States (born 1976)

His Excellency, The Most Reverend Cristiano Borro Barbosa
- Auxiliary Bishop of Boston
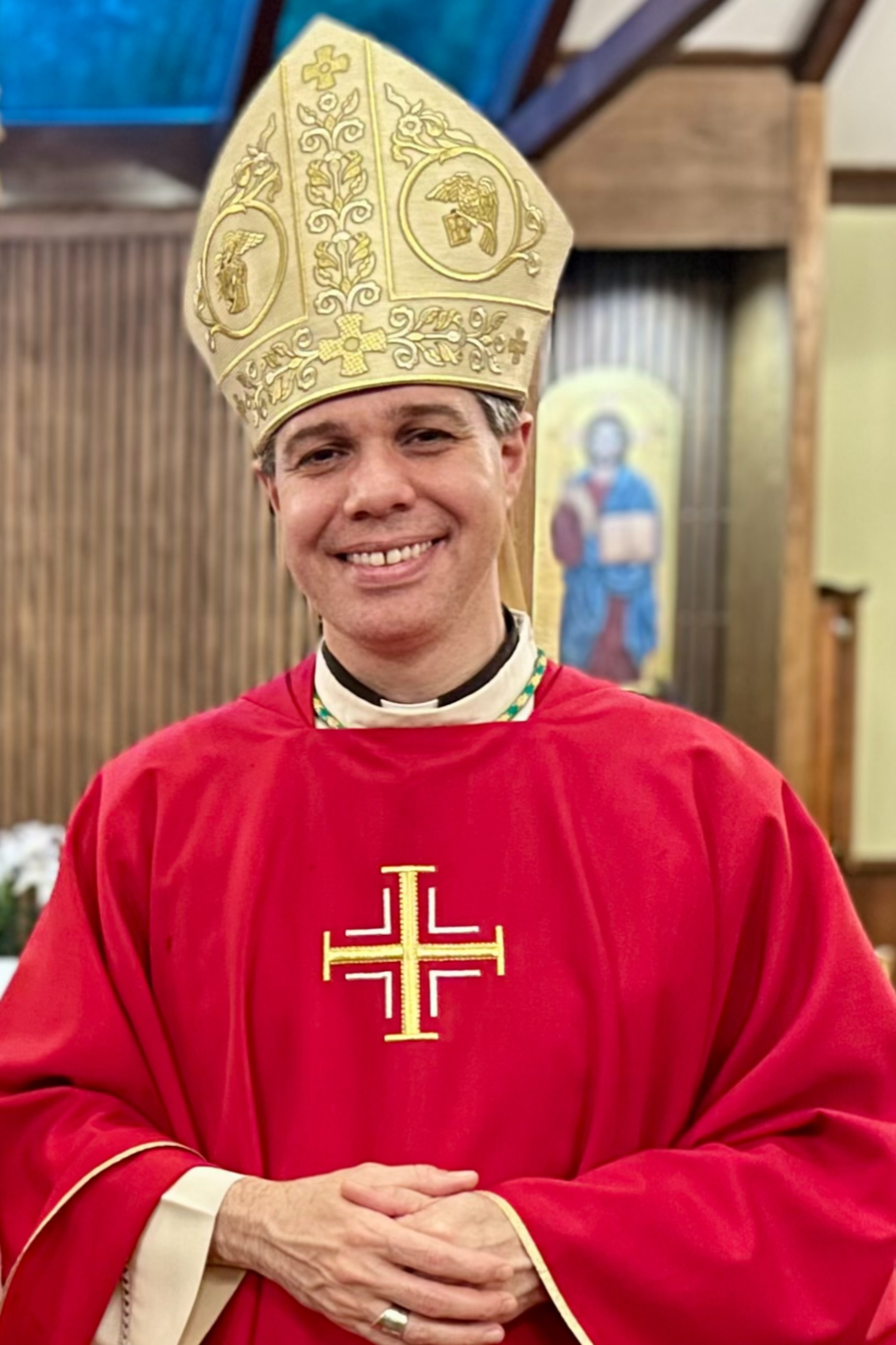
- Barbosa in 2025
- Church: Catholic Church; Latin Church
- Archdiocese: Boston
- Appointed: December 9, 2023
- Installed: February 3, 2024
- Other post: Titular Bishop of Membressa

Personal details
- Born: October 11, 1976 (age 49) Adamantina, São Paulo, Brazil
- Education: University of the Sacred Heart; Jesuit Faculty of Philosophy and Theology; Boston College School of Theology and Ministry
- Motto: Ut unum sint (Latin for 'That they may be one')

Ordination history
History
Priestly ordination
- Ordained by: Luiz Antônio Guedes
- Date: December 22, 2007
- Place: Paróquia Universitária do Sagrado Coração [Sacred Heart University Parish], Bauru, Brazil
Episcopal consecration
- Principal consecrator: Seán Patrick O'Malley
- Co-consecrators: Mark O'Connell, Robert P. Reed
- Date: February 3, 2024
- Place: Cathedral of the Holy Cross, Boston

Styles of Cristiano Guilherme Borro Barbosa
- Reference style: His Excellency; The Most Reverend
- Spoken style: Your Excellency
- Religious style: Bishop

Cristiano Guilherme Borro Barbosa (born October 11, 1976) is a Brazilian-born Catholic prelate who has served as an auxiliary bishop for the Archdiocese of Boston since 2023.

== Biography ==
=== Early life ===
Barbosa was born in Adamantina, Brazil, on October 11, 1976, to Antonio Dias Barbosa and Maria do Carmo Borro. He attended primary and secondary schools in Adamantina.

Deciding to become a priest, Barbosa entered the University of the Sacred Heart in Bauru, where he earned a Licentiate in Philosophy. He continued his education in 2005 at the Jesuit Faculty of Philosophy and Theology in Belo Horizonte, where he received a theology degree. Barbosa then enrolled in 2007 at the Pontifical Catholic University of Minas Gerais in Belo Horizonte, receiving a Master of Psychology degree.

=== Priesthood ===
Barbosa was ordained a priest for the Diocese of Bauru in Brazil on December 22, 2007, by Luiz Antônio Guedes, Bishop of Bauru.

Barbosa came to the United States in 2008 to study at the Boston College School of Theology and Ministry. During this period, he also served as a chaplain to the Portuguese and Brazilian Catholic communities in the archdiocese. Barbosa earned a Licentiate in Theology in 2011 and a Doctorate in Sacred Theology in 2019. His doctoral dissertation was titled "Speaking rightly about Christian hope and the resurrection of the body".

The archdiocese in 2019 assigned Barbosa as parochial vicar of two Cambridge parishes, Saint Anthony of Padua (Note: This parish serves the Portuguese-language community and is often known as "Saint Anthony of Padua or Lisbon".) and Saint Francis of Assisi, and then of three parishes in Lowell in 2019/20: Holy Family, Immaculate Conception, and Saint Anthony of Padua. In 2020, Barbosa joined the faculties of the Pope St. John XXIII National Seminary in Weston and of Saint John's Seminary in Boston.

Barbosa was incardinated, or transferred, from the Diocese of Bauru to the Archdiocese of Boston on November 5, 2021. On May 30, 2023, Cardinal Séan O'Malley appointed Barbosa as episcopal vicar for the central region of the archdiocese. This made him a member of the "cardinal's cabinet", of the priests' council, and of the archdiocesan board of consultors. He was also named secretary for evangelization and discipleship.

=== Auxiliary Bishop of Boston ===
Pope Francis appointed Barbosa as an auxiliary bishop of Boston on December 9, 2023. He was consecrated on February 3, 2024 at the Cathedral of the Holy Cross in Boston by O'Malley . His appointment made him the second youngest bishop in the United States and the second native Brazilian.

== See also ==
- Catholic Church hierarchy
- Catholic Church in the United States
- Historical list of the Catholic bishops of the United States
- List of Catholic bishops of the United States
- Lists of patriarchs, archbishops, and bishops
