= Peter J. Uglietto =

American prelate

His Excellency, The Most Reverend Peter J. Uglietto
- Auxiliary Bishop of Boston
- Church: Roman Catholic Church
- Archdiocese: Boston
- Appointed: June 30, 2010
- Installed: September 14, 2010
- Other post: Titular Bishop of Thubursicum

Orders
- Ordination: May 21, 1977
- Consecration: September 14, 2010 by Sean Patrick Cardinal O’Malley, Francis Xavier Irwin, and John Anthony Dooher

Personal details
- Born: September 24, 1951 (age 75) Cambridge, Massachusetts, US
- Education: Boston College; Saint John's Seminary; Pontifical Lateran University; Creighton University
- Motto: Guide our steps

Styles of Peter John Uglietto
- Reference style: His Excellency; The Most Reverend
- Spoken style: Your Excellency
- Religious style: Bishop

Ordination history of Peter J. Uglietto
History
Episcopal consecration
- Consecrated by: Sean Patrick Cardinal O’Malley

Peter John Uglietto (September 24, 1951) is an American Catholic prelate who has served as an auxiliary bishop for the Archdiocese of Boston in Massachusetts since 2010 and as vicar general since 2014.

== Biography ==
=== Early life ===
Peter Uglietto was born in Cambridge, Massachusetts, on September 24, 1951, the son of Salvatore and Dolores (Ciampi) Uglietto. He has two sisters. As a child, Peter Uglietto attended the St. Luke parish school in Cambridge before going to the Boston Archdiocesan Choir School in the same city. He then entered Boston College High School in Boston.

After graduating from high school, Uglietto entered Boston College, where he graduated in 1973 with a Bachelor of Arts degree. Having decided to enter the priesthood, he enrolled in Saint John's Seminary in Boston, receiving a Master of Divinity degree in 1977. Before his ordination, Uglietto served as a deacon at St. John the Baptist Parish in Quincy, Massachusetts.

=== Priesthood ===
Uglietto was ordained to the priesthood for the Archdiocese of Boston by Cardinal Humberto Medeiros on May 21, 1977, at the Cathedral of the Holy Cross in Boston. After his ordination, the archdiocese assigned Uglietto to pastoral positions in several parishes in Eastern Massachusetts over the next 11 years:

- St. Francis Xavier in Weymouth
- St. Gregory in Dorchester
- St. Margaret of Scotland in Dorchester

During this period, Uglietto also served as a retreat speaker for the archdiocesan Spiritual Development Office (1979 to 1988) and as adjunct spiritual director at St. John Seminary (1985 to 1988). For two years (1986 to 1988), he served as coordinator of spiritual directors and retreats with the diaconate program. In 1990, Uglietto began a three-year assignment as campus minister at Regis College in Weston, Massachusetts.

Uglietto earned a Licentiate in Sacred Theology from the Pontifical Lateran University at the Washington, D.C. campus of the John Paul II Institute. Uglietto has also received a Master of Christian Spirituality degree from Creighton University in Omaha, Nebraska. In 2005, Uglietto began serving at Pope John XXIII National Seminary in Weston, first as a professor of moral theology, then as rector and finally as president. He remained at the seminary until 2010.

=== Auxiliary Bishop of Boston ===
Uglietto was appointed as titular bishop of Thubursicum and auxiliary bishop of Boston on June 30, 2010, by Pope Benedict XVI. Uglietto was consecrated on September 14, 2010, by Cardinal Sean O’Malley at the Cathedral of the Holy Cross, with Bishops Francis Irwin and John Dooher serving as co-consecrators.

As auxiliary bishop, Uglietto was assigned the north region of the archdiocese. O'Malley appointed him as vicar general and moderator of the curia for the archdiocese in 2014.

== See also ==
- Catholic Church hierarchy
- Catholic Church in the United States
- Historical list of the Catholic bishops of the United States
- List of Catholic bishops of the United States
- Lists of patriarchs, archbishops, and bishops

== Episcopal succession ==
Catholic Church titles
Preceded by –	Auxiliary Bishop of Boston; 2010–present	Succeeded by Incumbent
Preceded by Sebastião Bandeira Coêlho	Titular Bishop of Thubursicum; 2010–present	Succeeded by Incumbent
