= Mark O'Connell (bishop) =

Canadian-born American prelate

His Excellency, The Most Reverend Mark O'Connell
- Bishop of Albany
- Church: Roman Catholic Church
- Diocese: Albany
- Appointed: October 20, 2025
- Installed: December 5, 2025
- Predecessor: Edward Bernard Scharfenberger
- Previous posts: Auxiliary Bishop of Boston and Titular Bishop of Gigthi (2016-2025)

Orders
- Ordination: June 16, 1990 by Bernard Law
- Consecration: August 24, 2016 by Seán Patrick O'Malley, Walter James Edyvean, and Peter J. Uglietto

Personal details
- Born: June 25, 1964 (age 61) Scarborough, Ontario, Canada
- Denomination: Roman Catholic
- Education: Boston College; Saint John's Seminary (Massachusetts); Pontifical University of the Holy Cross Rome
- Motto: Invenimus Messiam (We have found the Messiah)
- Coat of arms

Styles of Mark O'Connell
- Reference style: His Excellency; The Most Reverend
- Spoken style: Your Excellency
- Religious style: Bishop

Mark O'Connell (born June 25, 1964) is a Canadian-born American Catholic prelate who was appointed Bishop of Albany in October 2025, and was installed on December 5, 2025. He had served as an auxiliary bishop for the Archdiocese of Boston. He was the vicar general and moderator of the curia for the archdiocese from 2023 to 2025.

== Biography ==
=== Early life ===
Mark O'Connell was born in Scarborough, Ontario, on June 25, 1964, to Thomas F. and Margaret M. (Delaney) O'Connell, both American citizens. His father Thomas was the head librarian at York University in Toronto. Mark O'Connell has two older brothers and one older sister. The family returned to Massachusetts when Mark O'Connell was age 12, when father took a similar position at Boston College.

Mark O'Connell graduated from Dover-Sherborn High School in Dover, Massachusetts, in 1982. He then entered Boston College, earning a Bachelor of Arts degree in English and philosophy in 1986. Having decided to enter the priesthood, O'Connell then studied at Saint John's Seminary in Boston.

=== Priesthood ===
O'Connell was ordained into the priesthood at the Cathedral of the Holy Cross in Boston by Cardinal Bernard Law for the Archdiocese of Boston on June 16, 1990. After his ordination, O'Connell served in parishes in Woburn and Danvers and as a college chaplain at Salem State College, all in Massachusetts.

O'Connell undertook studies in canon law starting in 1997 at the Pontifical Athenaeum of the Holy Cross in Rome, completing his licentiate degree in 1999 and his doctorate in 2002. O'Connell's dissertation was titled The Mobility of Secular Clerics and Incardination. After returning to Boston, he joined the canonical affairs staff of the archdiocese in 2001 and was appointed judicial vicar in 2007, a position he held until 2018.

From 2009 to 2012, O'Connell served as a senior consultor to the Canon Law Society of America. He has also served on the faculty of Saint John's Seminary and the Pope St. John XXIII National Seminary in Weston, Massachusetts. From 2011 to 2014, O'Connell was a co-host on the daily radio program The Good Catholic Life, broadcast on radio station WQOM in Boston.

=== Auxiliary Bishop of Boston ===
Coat of Arms as Auxiliary Bishop of Boston

On June 3, 2016, Pope Francis appointed O'Connell as an auxiliary bishop of Boston and titular bishop of Gigthi in Tripolitana. He was consecrated on August 24, 2016, at the Cathedral of the Holy Cross by Cardinal Seán O'Malley, with Bishops Walter Edyvean and Peter Uglietto serving as co-consecrators.

As auxiliary bishop, O'Connell was assigned the north region of the archdiocese and appointed pastor of St. Theresa Parish in North Reading, Massachusetts, until December 2022. From January 2023, he served as vicar general and moderator of the curia of the archdiocese. For the US Conference of Catholic Bishops, O'Connell is a member of the Committee for the Protection of Children & Young People.

=== Bishop of Albany ===
On October 20, 2025, Pope Leo XIV named him the bishop of Albany, as successor to retiring Bishop Edward Scharfenberger. He was installed on December 5, 2025.

== See also ==
- Catholic Church hierarchy
- Catholic Church in the United States
- Historical list of the Catholic bishops of the United States
- List of the Catholic bishops of the United States
- Lists of patriarchs, archbishops, and bishops
