= Arthur Leo Kennedy =

American prelate

His Excellency, The Most Reverend Arthur Leo Kennedy
- Auxiliary Bishop Emeritus of Boston; Titular Bishop of Timidana
- Church: Roman Catholic Church
- Archdiocese: Boston
- Appointed: June 30, 2010
- Installed: September 14, 2010
- Retired: June 30, 2017
- Other post: Titular Bishop of Timidana

Orders
- Ordination: December 17, 1966 by Francis Frederick Reh
- Consecration: September 14, 2010 by Seán Patrick O'Malley, Walter James Edyvean, and Robert Francis Hennessey

Personal details
- Born: January 9, 1942 (age 84) Boston, Massachusetts
- Denomination: Roman Catholic
- Education: Boston Latin School; Saint John's Seminary (B.A.); Pontifical Gregorian University (S.T.L.); Boston University (PhD)
- Motto: Ut cognoscant Te (So that they may know You)

Styles of Arthur Leo Kennedy
- Reference style: His Excellency; The Most Reverend
- Spoken style: Your Excellency
- Religious style: Bishop

Ordination history of Arthur Leo Kennedy
History
Priestly ordination
- Ordained by: Francis Frederick Reh
Episcopal consecration
- Principal consecrator: Seán Patrick O'Malley
- Co-consecrators: Walter James Edyvean, Robert Francis Hennessey

Arthur Leo Kennedy (born January 9, 1942) is an American prelate of the Roman Catholic Church who served as an auxiliary bishop of the Archdiocese of Boston in Massachusetts from 2010 to 2017. After retirement, Kennedy took up residence at St. Mary's Parish in Dedham, Massachusetts.

Kenney currently serves as president of the new Catholic Institute of Technology in Castel Gandolfo, Italy.

== Biography ==
=== Early life and education ===
Arthur Kennedy was born on January 9, 1942, in Boston to Arthur and Helen (O’Rourke) Kennedy. He has four brothers (Kevin, Terrence, Christopher, and Brian) and one sister (Maurabeth). Kennedy has four nieces and four nephews. Kennedy attended Longfellow Elementary School in the Roslindale section of Boston and St. Aidan Grammar School in Brookline, Massachusetts. He then entered Boston Latin School for his secondary education, graduating in 1959.

Kennedy received his Bachelor of Arts in philosophy from Saint John's Seminary College in Boston in 1963.

=== Ordination, education and ministry ===
On December 17, 1966, Kennedy was ordained a priest of the Archdiocese of Boston in St. Peter’s Basilica in Rome by Bishop Francis Reh.

After his ordination, Kennedy was assigned to St. Monica Parish in Methuen, Massachusetts. He obtained a Licentiate of Sacred Theology from the Pontifical Gregorian University in 1967. In 1969, Kennedy was posted to St. Joseph Parish in East Boston, serving there until 1974.

In 1974, Kennedy went to Minnesota to join the faculty of the Theology and Catholic Studies departments at the University of St. Thomas (UST) in St. Paul. He earned his doctorate in systematic theology/philosophy of religion in 1978 from Boston University. In 1983, Kennedy was named as an associate professor at UST and in 2001 a full professor. While at UST, Kennedy performed pastoral duties at Holy Trinity Parish in South Saint Paul, Minnesota, from 1974 to 1982 and at the Church of the Assumption in St. Paul from 1982 to 2000.

Kennedy also served on the faculty of the Saint Paul Seminary School of Divinity in St. Paul (1990, 1995–2000, 2006) and was director of the Masters in Theology degree program.

In 2002, Kennedy was appointed as executive director of the Secretariat for Ecumenical and Interreligious Affairs for the United States Conference of Catholic Bishops in Washington, D.C. In 2007, Kennedy returned to Boston to serve as rector of Saint John's Seminary, holding that position until July 2012.

=== Auxiliary Bishop of Boston ===
On June 30, 2010, Pope Benedict XVI appointed Kennedy as auxiliary bishop of the Archdiocese of Boston and titular bishop of Timidana. He was consecrated by Cardinal Seán O'Malley on September 14, 2010, at the Cathedral of the Holy Cross in Boston. Kennedy's episcopal motto was: Ut cognoscant te, meaning, "so that they may know you" from Saint John's Gospel (John 17:3).

In January 2012, Cardinal O'Malley named Kennedy as episcopal vicar for the New Evangelization of the archdiocese.

=== Retirement and Beyond ===
Pope Francis accepted Kennedy's letter of resignation as auxiliary bishop of Boston on June 30, 2017.

In 2023, Kennedy accepted the position of university president at the Catholic Institute of Technology, an American STEM school based in Castel Gandolfo, Italy. That same year, Kennedy received the priest-scholar award from the Catholic Studies Department of UST.

== See also ==
- Catholic Church hierarchy
- Catholic Church in the United States
- Historical list of the Catholic bishops of the United States
- List of Catholic bishops of the United States
- Lists of patriarchs, archbishops, and bishops
