= Sexual abuse scandal in the Roman Catholic Diocese of Fall River =

The sexual abuse scandal in Fall River diocese is a significant episode in the series of Catholic sex abuse cases in the United States and Ireland. The Roman Catholic priest Father James Porter was convicted of molesting 28 children, but he admitted to have sexually abused at least 100 children of both sexes over a period of 30 years. He had started abusing his victims in the 1960s.

On June 16, 1992, following the Porter affair, Bishop Seán Patrick O'Malley was chosen to head the Diocese of Fall River in Massachusetts. He was installed on the following August 11. While Bishop of Fall River, O'Malley settled 101 abuse claims and initiated a zero-tolerance policy against sexual abuse. He also instituted one of the first comprehensive sexual abuse policies in the Roman Catholic Church.

== James Porter affair ==
Father James Porter was a Roman Catholic priest who was convicted of molesting 28 children; he admitted sexually abusing at least 100 of both sexes over a period of 30 years, starting in the 1960s.

== 101 abuse claims ==
On June 16, 1992, following the Porter affair, Bishop Sean O'Malley was chosen to head the Diocese of Fall River. He was installed on the following August 11. While Bishop of Fall River, O'Malley settled 101 abuse claims and initiated a zero-tolerance policy against sexual abuse. He also instituted one of the first comprehensive sexual abuse policies in the Roman Catholic Church.

== Laicization of Edward Paquette ==
Father Edward Paquette, who was dismissed from the Diocese of Fall River and stripped of his priestly faculties in 1963 after accusations of "improper behavior" with young boys, only to resurface a year later as a priest in Indiana and then in Vermont, was officially removed from the priesthood by Pope Benedict XVI.

== Continued allegations ==
The Survivors Network of those Abused by Priests has alleged that the Fall River Diocese has not done enough to inform the public about allegations against a Maine priest who once served in the Fall River and Attleboro areas, but diocesan officials have said that they already have done everything the group is now demanding.

== Lawsuit against former Bishop ==
In 2018, a judge ruled that a lawsuit against former Fall River Bishop Daniel Cronin, alleging that Cronin protected a priest who sexually abused two altar boys in the 1970s and 1980s, could proceed.

== 2020 lawsuits ==
In January 2020, it was announced lawsuits alleging sex abuse by nine priests and one church employment between 1947 and 1986 were filed against the Diocese of Fall River.

== Mark R. Hession affair ==
On December 11, 2020, a secret grand jury at Barnstable Superior Court indicted Father Mark R. Hession, also known as “Father Mark,” on two counts of Rape, one count of Indecent Assault and Battery on a Child Under Age 14, and one count of Intimidation of a Witness. Hession was known to many locals because of his past work at Our Lady of Victory Church. Hession also worked closely with the Kennedy family and even delivered the homily at Senator Edward “Ted” Kennedy’s funeral in August of 2009. Hession, who was arrested after he was charged, pled not guilty and posted bail on January 11, 2021. However, his passport was confiscated and he was ordered to stay away from the accuser. At the time he posted bail, it was acknowledged that Hession had been suspended from ministry by the Diocese of Fall River since 2019.

== See also ==
- Abuse
- Charter for the Protection of Children and Young People
- Child abuse
- Child sexual abuse
- Essential Norms
- National Review Board
- Pontifical Commission for the Protection of Minors
- Religious abuse
- Sexual abuse
- Sexual misconduct
- Spiritual abuse
