= John Anthony Dooher =

American prelate

His Excellency, The Most Reverend John Anthony Dooher
- Auxiliary Bishop Emeritus of Boston; Titular Bishop of Theveste
- Archdiocese: Boston
- Appointed: October 12, 2006
- Installed: December 12, 2006
- Retired: June 30, 2018
- Other post: Titular Bishop of Theveste

Orders
- Ordination: May 21, 1969 by Richard Cushing
- Consecration: December 12, 2006 by Seán Patrick O'Malley, Francis Xavier Irwin, and Walter James Edyvean

Personal details
- Born: May 3, 1943 (age 83) Dorchester, Massachusetts
- Motto: Come follow me

Styles of John Anthony Dooher
- Reference style: His Excellency; The Most Reverend
- Spoken style: Your Excellency
- Religious style: Bishop

John Anthony Dooher (born May 3, 1943) is an American prelate of the Roman Catholic Church. He served as an auxiliary bishop of the Archdiocese of Boston in Massachusetts from 2006 to 2018.

== Biography ==
=== Early life and education ===
John Dooher was born on May 3, 1943, in Dorchester, Boston, Massachusetts, to Irish immigrants Anthony (Tony) and Brigid (Patsy) Dooher. One of four children, he has two brothers, Francis and Terence, and one sister, Kathleen. Following the death of his aunt, many of his cousins moved in with his family. The Dooher family included several priests.

Dooher said that he was inspired to enter the priesthood as a young man by the Reverend Mortimer Gavin, who founded the Boston Labor Guild. Dooher studied at St. John's Seminary in Boston, obtaining a Bachelor of Arts degree in 1965 and a Master of Divinity degree in 1969.

=== Ordination and ministry ===
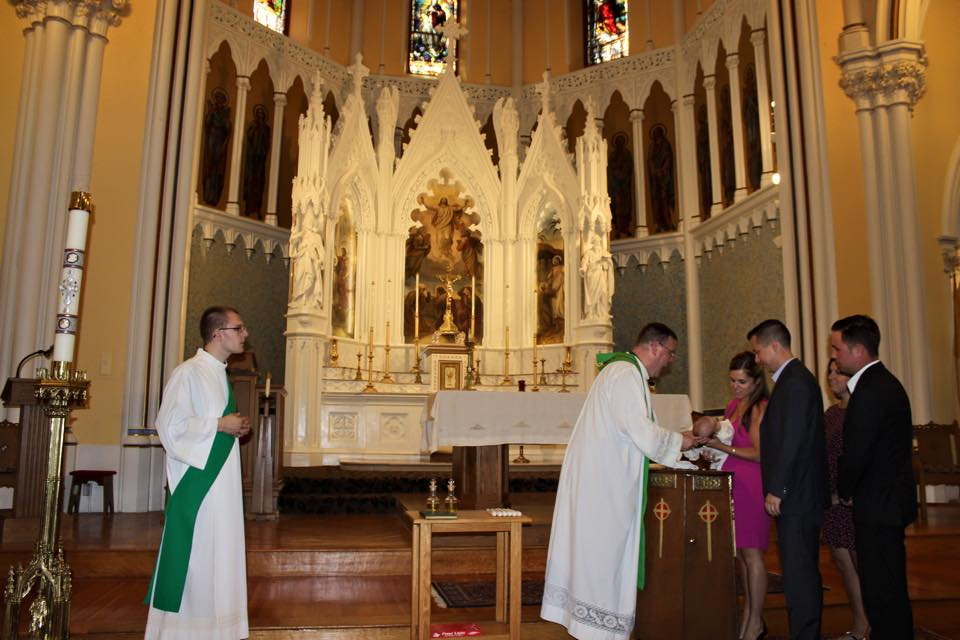
St. Mary's Church, Dedham, Massachusetts (2015)

Dooher was ordained to the priesthood for the Archdiocese of Boston on May 21, 1969, by Cardinal Richard Cushing. After ordination, Dooher served as associate pastor at St. Francis Xavier Parish in Weymouth, Massachusetts, also working as chaplain at South Shore Hospital in Weymouth and the Naval Air Station South Weymouth. In 1974, Dooher was posted to St. Augustine Parish in South Boston. During this period, he also served as president of the Priests' Senate (1978–1982) and director of the Office of Spiritual Development (1982–1991).

From 1991 to 1996, Dooher served in pastoral postings at St. Vincent de Paul Parish and Saints Peter and Paul Parish in Boston, which were later merged. In 1996, Dooher was named pastor of St. Mary of the Assumption Parish in Dedham, Massachusetts. At St. Mary's, Dooher also founded the Life Teen program. He said that Life Teen was

"one of the most satisfying things I've ever been involved with in ministry. If there's any group that needs to feel as if they belong to a church, its teenagers, and Life Teen really helps with that."

Dooher was part of the Singing Priests, a group that performed for various charities; he played the guitar, harp, and piano.

=== Auxiliary Bishop of Boston ===
On October 12, 2006, Pope Benedict XVI appointed Dooher as an auxiliary bishop of the Archdiocese of Boston and titular bishop of Theveste . He received his episcopal consecration on December 12, 2006, from Cardinal Seán O'Malley, with Bishops Francis Irwin and Walter Edyvean serving as co-consecrators. As an auxiliary, Dooher served as regional bishop for the South Pastoral Region.

Dooher's appointment was met with some criticism from advocates of sexual abuse victims' rights, who claimed that Dooher "abetted a harmful and immoral coverup for the Boston archdiocese" as a priest. He had been mentioned in a 2003 report by Massachusetts Attorney General Thomas Reilly as one of two priests who in the mid-1990's met with pastors in parishes affected by abuse cases. In a 2002 deposition by Bishop John McCormack, Dooher was noted as having participated in conversations in the archdiocese in 1994 about where to house abusive priests.

=== Retirement ===
On June 30, 2018, Pope Francis accepted Dooher's letter of resignation as auxiliary bishop of the Archdiocese of Boston after he reached the mandatory retirement age of 75.

== See also ==
- Catholic Church hierarchy
- Catholic Church in the United States
- Historical list of the Catholic bishops of the United States
- List of Catholic bishops of the United States
- Lists of patriarchs, archbishops, and bishops

== Episcopal succession ==
Catholic Church titles
Preceded by –	Auxiliary Bishop of Boston; 2006–2018	Succeeded by –
