= Archdiocese of Boston =

Latin Catholic jurisdiction in the US

Archdiocese of Boston Archidiœcesis Bostoniensis
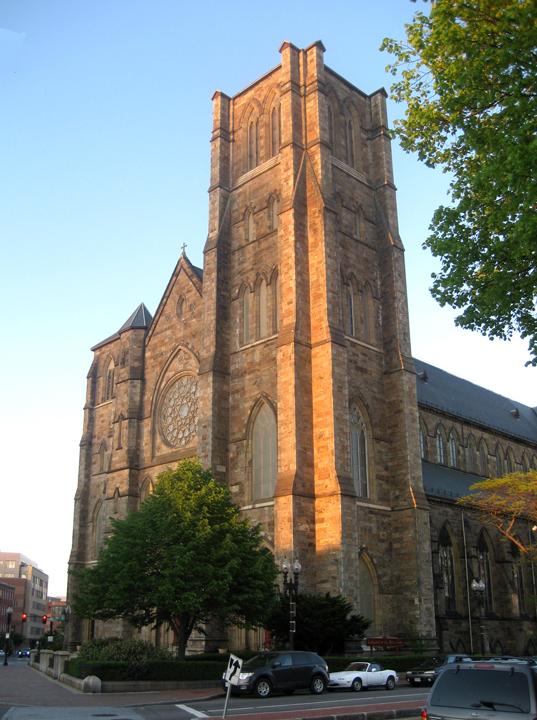
- Cathedral of the Holy Cross, Boston, 2007

- Coat of arms

Location
- Country: United States
- Territory: Essex County, Middlesex County, Norfolk County, Suffolk County, and also Plymouth County except the towns of Marion, Mattapoisett, and Wareham
- Ecclesiastical province: Boston
- Coordinates: 42°12′47″N 71°02′29″W

Statistics
- Area: 6,386 km^{2} (2,466 sq mi)
- Population: Total; Catholics: (as of 2021); 4,420,879; 1,989,396 (45%)
- Parishes: 266

Information
- Denomination: Catholic Church
- Sui iuris church: Latin Church
- Rite: Roman Rite
- Established: April 8, 1808; 218 years ago
- Cathedral: Cathedral of the Holy Cross
- Patron saint: Saint Patrick
- Secular priests: 952 (600 diocesan; 352 religious)

Current leadership
- Pope: Leo XIV
- Metropolitan Archbishop: Richard Garth Henning
- Auxiliary Bishops: Robert Francis Hennessey; Robert P. Reed; Peter J. Uglietto; Cristiano Borro Barbosa
- Bishops emeritus: Seán Patrick O'Malley; John Anthony Dooher; Arthur Kennedy

Map
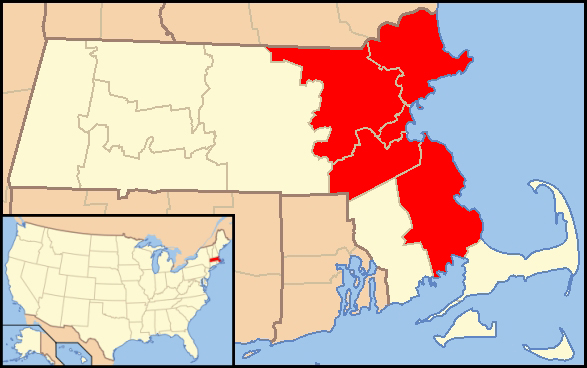

Website
- bostoncatholic.org

The Archdiocese of Boston (Latin: Archidiœcesis Bostoniensis) is an archdiocese of the Catholic Church in eastern Massachusetts in the United States. Its mother church is the Cathedral of the Holy Cross in Boston.

The Diocese of Boston was erected in 1808, branching off from the Diocese of Baltimore. It grew rapidly during the 19th century; today it is the fourth largest archdiocese in the United States. The current archbishop is Richard Henning.

== Territory ==
The Archdiocese of Boston encompasses Essex County, Middlesex County, Norfolk County, and Suffolk County in Massachusetts. It includes most of Plymouth County except for the towns of Marion, Mattapoisett, and Wareham.

== History ==
=== Early history ===
During the 17th century, the Massachusetts colonies enacted legal restrictions on Catholics, Anglicans, Quakers, and other non-Puritan Protestants. They also enacted specific bans on Catholic worship. By 1700, the British Province of Massachusetts Bay had made it a crime, with a potential life sentence, for a Catholic priest to reside in the colony.

With the start of the American Revolutionary War in 1776, attitudes towards Catholics shifted in the American colonies. The rebel leaders needed to gain the support of Catholics for their cause. In addition, the alliance with Catholic France fostered a more favorable attitude among Americans towards Catholicism. The Constitution of the new Commonwealth of Massachusetts, written by future US President John Adams and ratified in 1780, established religious freedom for Catholics in the new state. With the Massachusetts constitution being the first state constitution in the United States, its framework of government became a model for the constitutions of other states and, eventually, for the federal constitution.

In 1788, the Abbé de la Poterie, a former French naval chaplain, celebrated the city's first public mass in a converted Huguenot chapel at 24 School Street in Boston. It became Holy Cross Church, the first Catholic church in the Commonwealth. By 1800, two refugee priests from the French Revolution, Francis Anthony Matignon and John Cheverus, were ministering to the few Catholics in the region. They raised the funds to build a larger building, the Church of the Holy Cross (since demolished). With the erection of the Diocese of Baltimore in 1789, Catholics in Massachusetts now came under American Catholic jurisdiction.

=== 1800 to 1870 ===
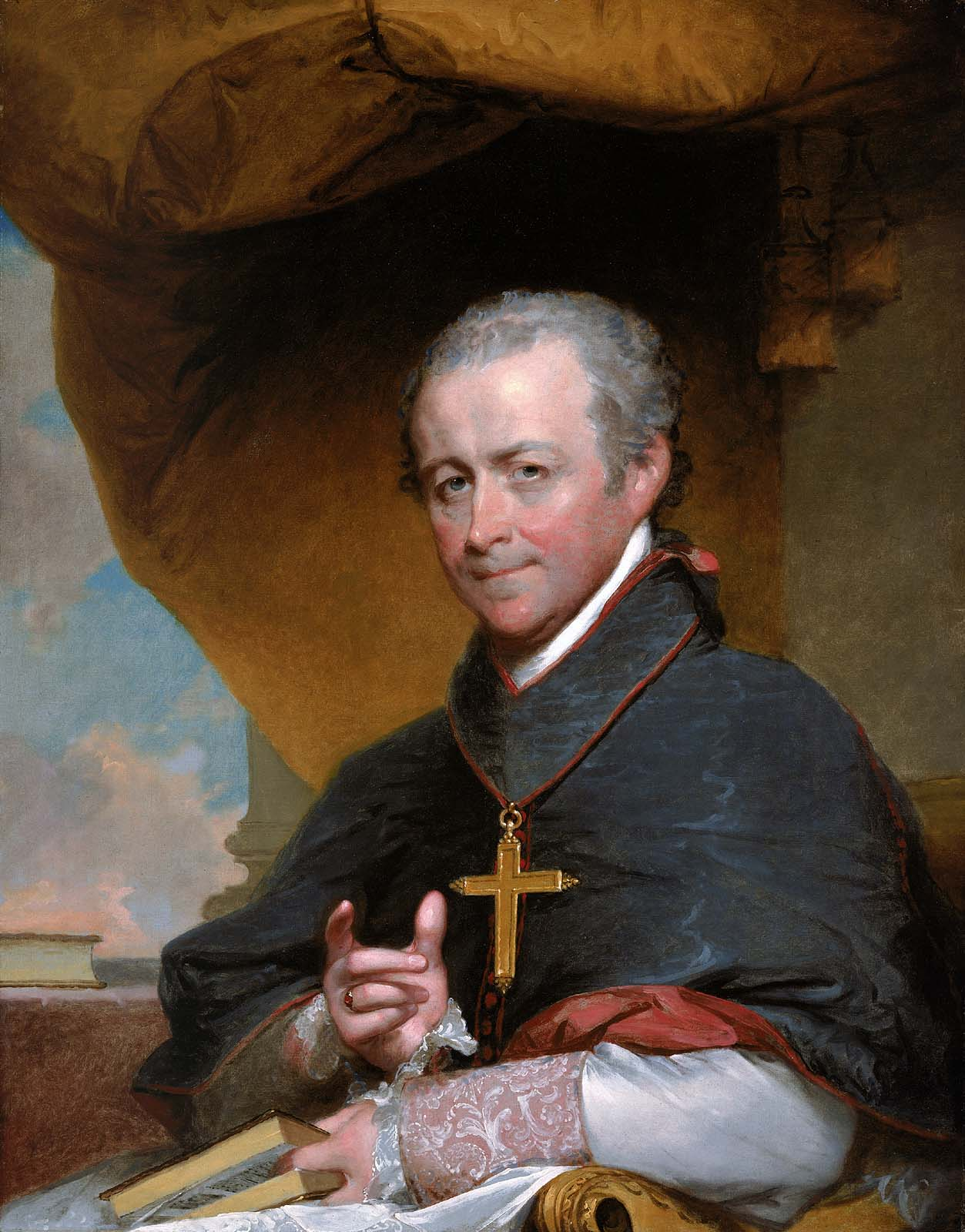
Portrait of Jean-Louis Lefebvre de Cheverus by Gilbert Stuart (1823)

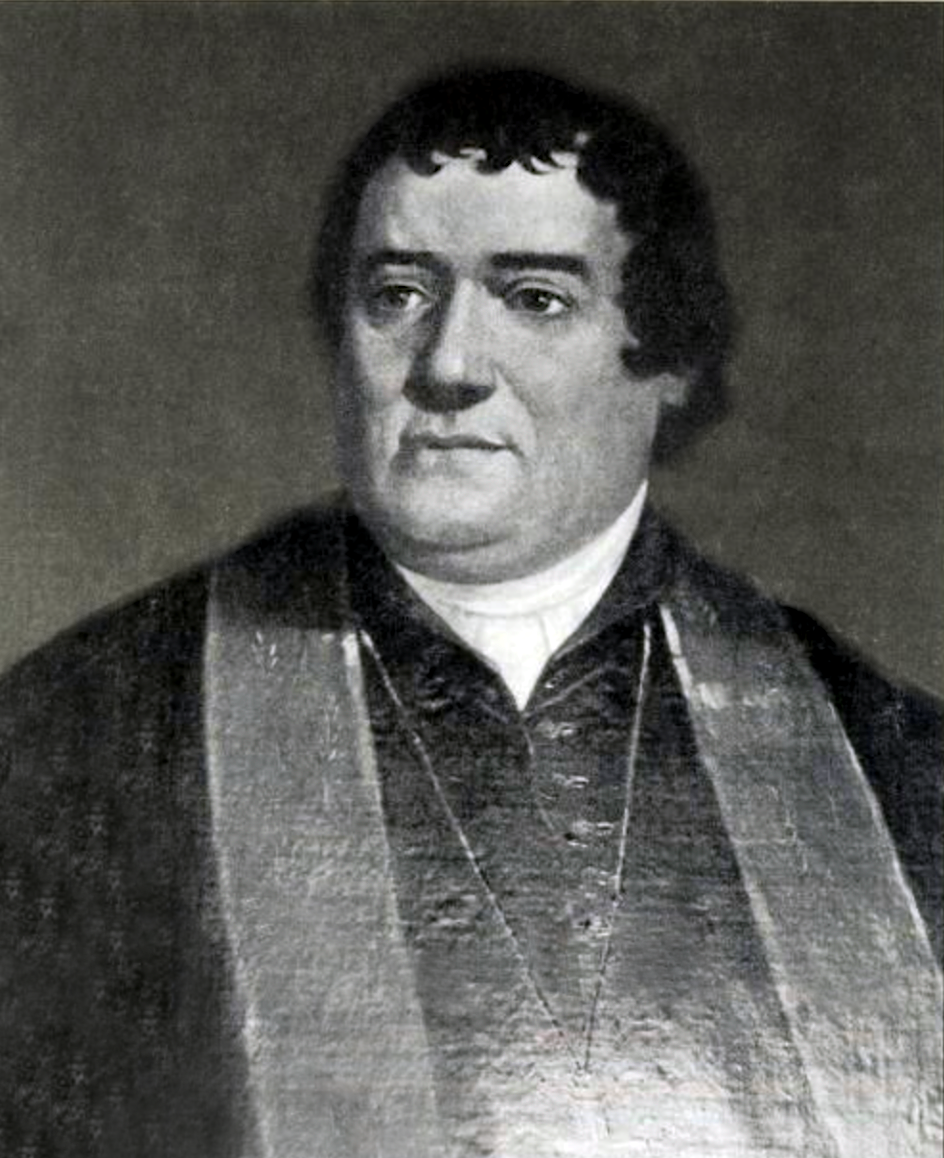
Bishop Fenwick (1846)

Pope Pius VII erected the Diocese of Boston on April 8, 1808, taking all of New England from the Diocese of Baltimore. The new diocese consisted of the states of Connecticut, Massachusetts (which included present-day Maine), New Hampshire, Rhode Island, and Vermont. The pope named Cheverus as the first bishop of Boston.

Cheverus supported the establishment in 1816 of the Provident Institution for Savings in Boston, the first chartered savings bank in the United States He believed the bank would help his parishioners establish good financial practices. In 1820, Cheverus oversaw the opening of an Ursuline convent in the rectory of Holy Cross Cathedral with a girls school for poor children. He was appointed in 1823 as bishop of Montauban in France.

Monsignor Benedict Fenwick was appointed the second bishop of Boston by Pope Leo XII on May 10, 1825. Though the ecclesiastical jurisdiction of the diocese encompassed all of New England, Fenwick had only two priests under his charge, who served three Catholic churches, besides the cathedral, in all of New England: Saint Augustine's Chapel in Boston, St. Patrick's Church in Newcastle, Maine, and a small church in Claremont, New Hampshire. Throughout New England, there were approximately 10,000 Catholics.

Due to significant Irish immigration, the Catholic population in the diocese grew to at least 30,000 by 1833. Fenwick traveled throughout the large territory to manage the diocese and administer the sacrament of confirmation. This included visiting Penobscot and Passamaquoddy tribes in Maine, who were largely Catholic, and were the subject of intensive proselytism by Protestant evangelists. Fenwick ordered the construction of St. Anne's Church in Old Town, Maine, for them in 1828, and sought to improve their schools.

Fenwick addressed a shortage of priests in his diocese by sending prospective seminarians to Maryland and Canada to be educated, and by incardinating several priests from other dioceses. He also trained several students in a makeshift seminary at his episcopal residence. As a result, the number of priests in the diocese had increased to 24 by 1833. At the same time, many new parishes were founded throughout New England.

On August 10, 1834, posters were displayed in Charleston that declared an ultimatum: unless the Ursuline Convent and Academy of Mount Benedict were investigated by the board of selectmen of Charlestown, it would be "demolished" by the "Truckmen of Boston." The following day, authorities were sent to inspect the convent. As they left, a mob of 2,000, wearing masks or painted faces, encircled the convent. They threw bricks through the windows, stole precious objects from the interior, and then lit it ablaze; the nuns fled. The fire department arrived, but did not attempt to extinguish the fire.

By the end of Fenwick's episcopate, the number of Catholics in the Diocese of Boston (after the removal of the Diocese of Hartford) had increased to 70,000, in addition to 37 priests, and 44 churches. Fenwick died in 1846.

Dioceses created out of the Diocese and Archdiocese of Boston
Date of diocese	Diocese name	Territory taken from Diocese and Archdiocese of Boston
1843	Diocese of Hartford	Connecticut, Rhode Island and counties in southeastern Massachusetts
1853	Diocese of Burlington	Vermont.
1853	Diocese of Portland	Maine and New Hampshire .
1870	Diocese of Springfield	Counties in western and central Massachusetts

=== 1870 to present ===
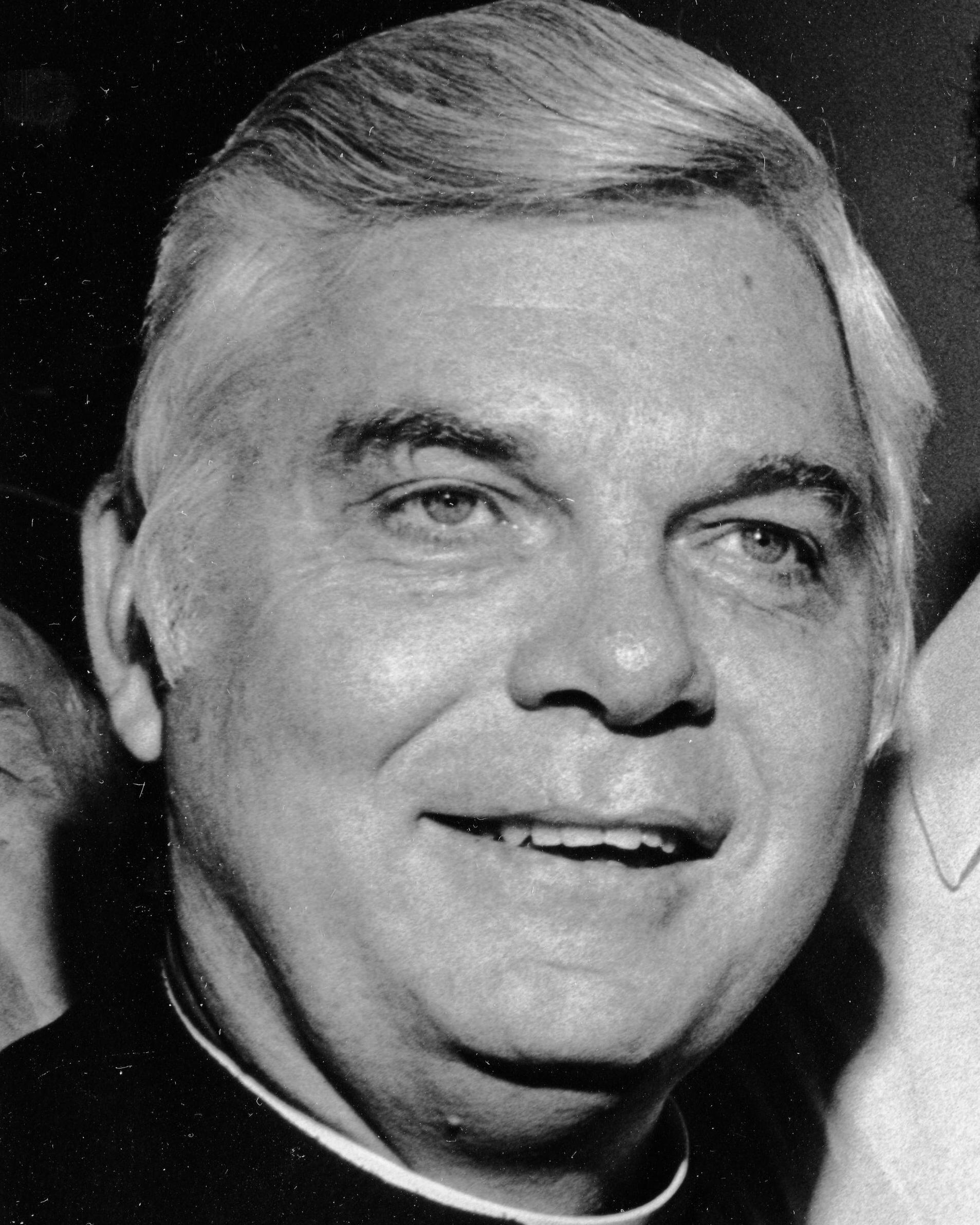
Cardinal Law (2013)

In the 1920s, Cardinal William O'Connell moved the chancery from offices near Holy Cross Cathedral in the South End to 127 Lake Street in the Brighton neighborhood of Boston. "Lake Street" was a metonym for the bishop and the office of the archdiocese.

At the beginning of the 21st century the archdiocese was shaken by accusations of sexual abuse by clergy that culminated in the resignation of its archbishop, Cardinal Bernard Francis Law, on December 13, 2002. In September 2003, the archdiocese settled over 500 abuse-related claims for $85 million. Victims received an average of $92,000 each. Perpetrators included 140 priests and two others.

In June 2004, the archdiocese sold the archbishop's residence and the chancery and surrounding lands in Brighton to Boston College, in part to defray costs associated with numerous cases of sexual abuse by clergy of the archdiocese. The archdiocesan offices of the archdiocese moved to Braintree. The archdiocesan seminary, Saint John's Seminary, remains on the property in Brighton.

Additional sex abuse allegations within the Archdiocese of Boston surfaced in later years. This included alleged abuse at Saint John's Seminary and Arlington Catholic High School. The Archdiocese of Boston lobbies against the proposed law to remove the statute of limitations on child sexual abuse lawsuits. From 2011 and 2019 the Catholic Church in Massachusetts spent over half a million dollars lobbying against such laws.

== Coat of arms ==
The coat of arms of the archdiocese has a blue shield with a gold cross and a gold "trimount" over a silver and blue "Barry-wavy" at the base of the shield.

- The "trimount" of three coupreaux represents the City of Boston, the original name of which was Trimountaine in reference to the three hills that were the site of the city's original settlement.
- The cross, fleurettée, honors the Cathedral of the Holy Cross. It also serves as a reminder that John Cheverus, the first bishop of Boston, and other early ecclesiastics were French.
- The "Barry-wavy" is a symbol of the sea. It alludes to Boston's role as a major seaport whose first non-indigenous settlers came from across the sea.

== Communications media ==
The diocesan newspaper The Pilot has been published in Boston since 1829.

The Catholictv Network was founded as the Catholic Television Center in 1955. From 1964 to 1966, it owned and operated the broadcast television station WIHS-TV.

== Ecclesiastical province ==
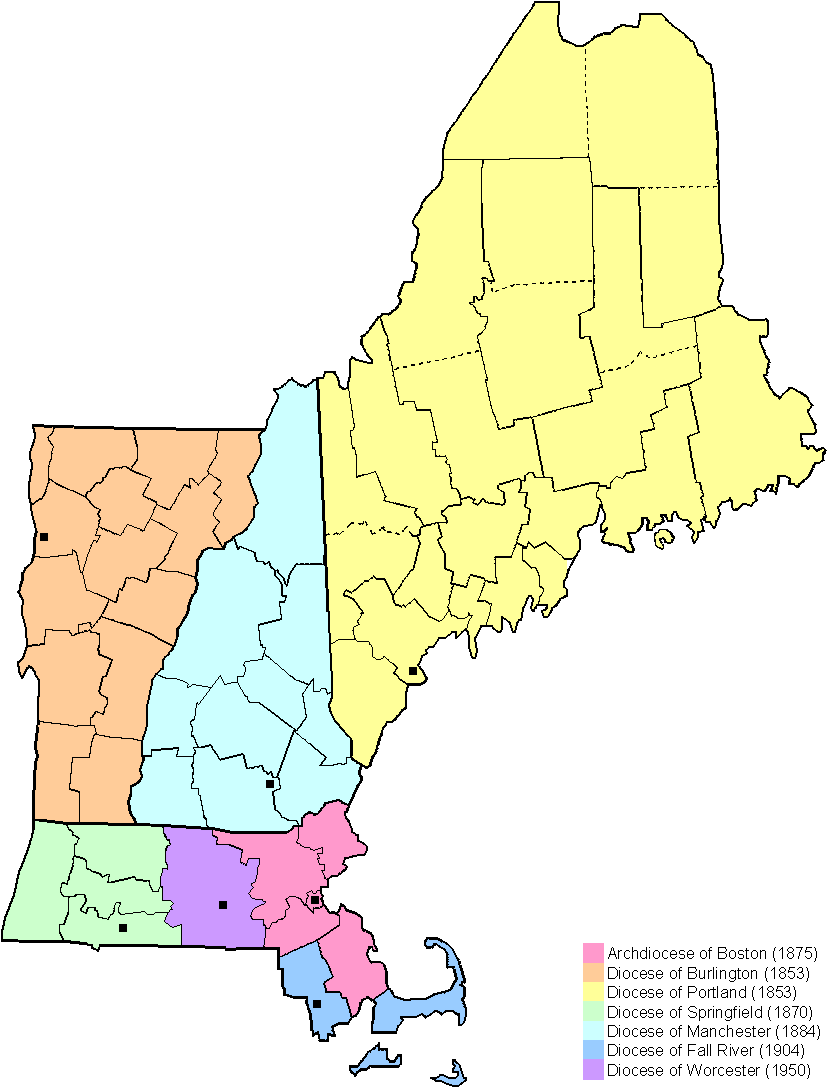
Ecclesiastical Province of Boston

The Archdiocese of Boston is also the metropolitan see for the ecclesiastical province of Boston. This means that the archbishop of Boston is the metropolitan for the province. The suffragan dioceses in the province are the Diocese of Burlington, Diocese of Fall River, Diocese of Manchester, Diocese of Portland, Diocese of Springfield in Massachusetts, and the Diocese of Worcester.

== Pastoral regions ==
The Archdiocese of Boston is divided into five pastoral regions, each headed by an episcopal vicar.

Pastoral regions of the Archdiocese of Boston
Pastoral region	Episcopal vicar	Territory	Parishes	Institutions of higher education	High schools	Primary schools	Cemeteries
Central	Auxiliary Bishop Cristiano B. Barbosa	Boston, Brookline, Cambridge,Somerville, Winthrop	64	Boston College; Emmanuel College; St. John's Seminary	6	29	8
Merrimack	Auxiliary Bishop Robert F. Hennessey	Northern Essex County, Northern Middlesex County	49	Merrimack College	3	(TBD)	4
North	Monsignor Brian McHugh	Southern Essex County, Eastern Middlesex County	64	none	4	6 (?)	11
South	Monsignor Robert Connors	Plymouth County, Eastern Norfolk County	59	Labouré College	3	(TBD)	3
West	Auxiliary Bishop Robert P. Reed	Southern Middlesex County, Western Norfolk Country	67	Regis College	3	11	7

== Bishops ==
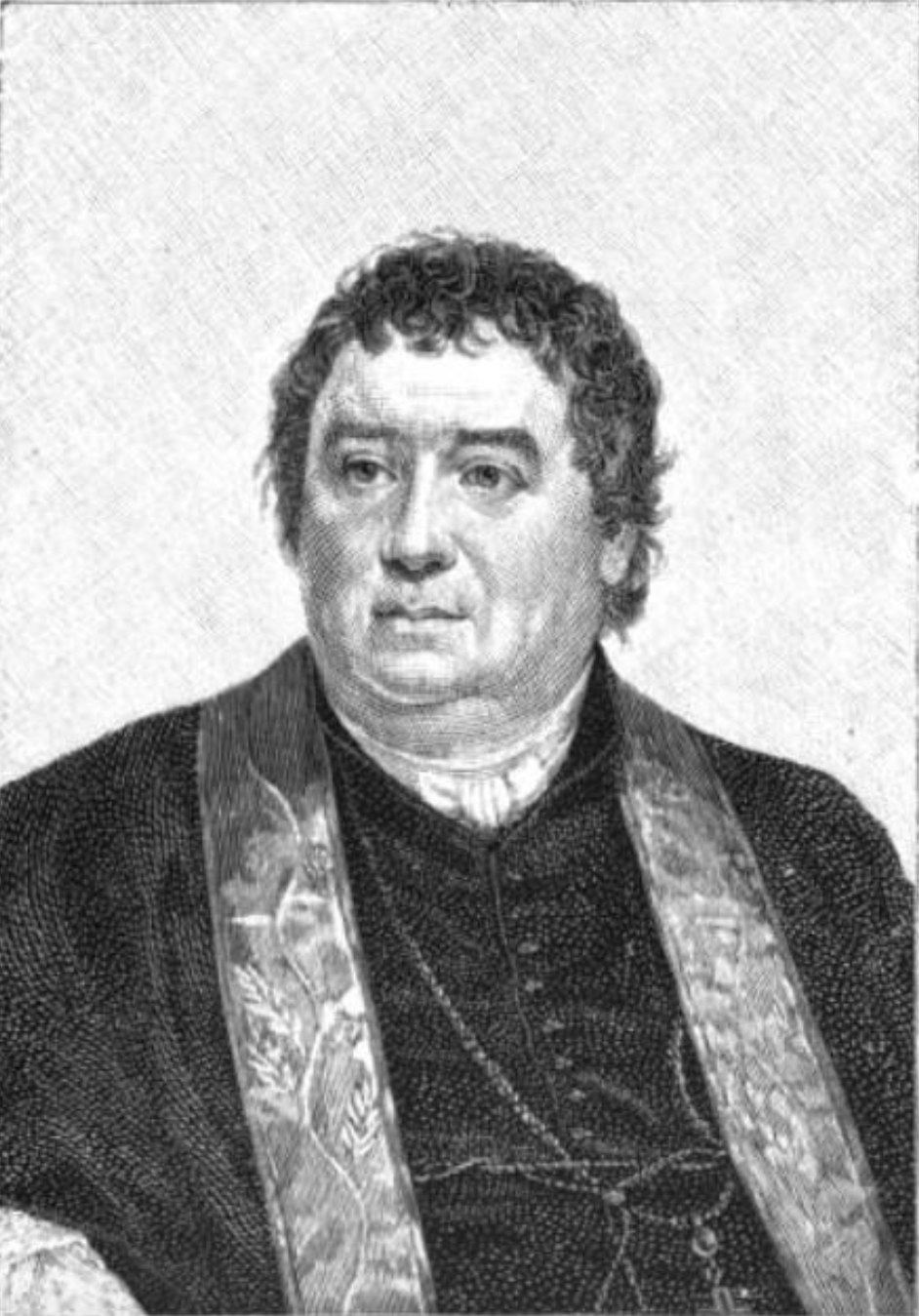
Bishop Fenwick (pre-1891)

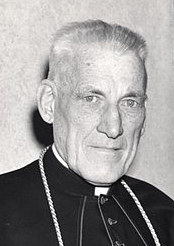
Cardinal Cushing (pre-1968)

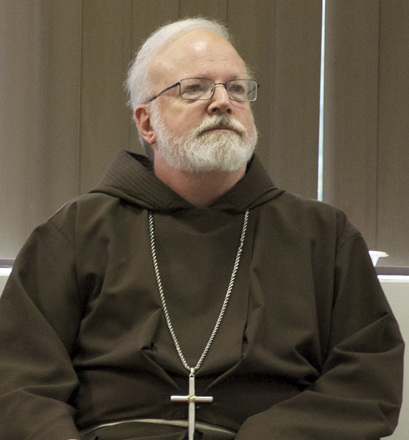
Cardinal O'Malley (2010)

=== Bishops of Boston ===
1. Jean-Louis Lefebvre de Cheverus (1808–1823) appointed Bishop of Montauban and later Archbishop of Bordeaux (elevated to Cardinal in 1836)
2. Benedict Joseph Fenwick (1825–1846)
3. John Bernard Fitzpatrick (1846–1866; coadjutor bishop 1844–1846)
4. John Joseph Williams (1866–1875; coadjutor bishop 1866); elevated to Archbishop

=== Archbishops of Boston ===
1. John Joseph Williams (1875–1907)
2. William Henry O'Connell (1907–1944; coadjutor archbishop 1906–1907)
3. Richard James Cushing (1944–1970)
4. Humberto Sousa Medeiros (1970–1983)
5. Bernard Francis Law (1984–2002), resigned; later appointed Archpriest of the Basilica di Santa Maria Maggiore
6. Seán Patrick O'Malley (2003–2024) (Note: Pope Francis accepted the resignation of Cardinal Seán P. O’Malley, OFM Cap., on August 5, 2024, and appointed Bishop Richard G. Henning of Providence, as his successor. Henning was installed on October 31, 2024.)
7. Richard Henning (2024–present)

=== Current auxiliary bishops of Boston ===
- Robert Francis Hennessey (2006–present)
- Peter John Uglietto (2010–present)
- Robert P. Reed (2016–present)
- Cristiano Borro Barbosa (2024–present)

=== Former auxiliary bishops of Boston ===
- John Brady (1891–1910)
- Joseph Gaudentius Anderson (1909–1927)
- John Bertram Peterson (1927–1932), Bishop of Manchester
- Francis Spellman (1932–1939), Archbishop of New York (Cardinal in 1946)
- Richard J. Cushing (1939–1944), Archbishop here (Cardinal in 1958)
- Louis Francis Kelleher (1945–1946)
- John Wright (1947–1950), Bishop of Worcester, then Bishop of Pittsburgh, then Prefect of the Congregation for the Clergy (elevated to Cardinal in 1969)
- Thomas Francis Markham (1950–1952)
- Eric Francis MacKenzie (1950–1969)
- Jeremiah Francis Minihan (1954–1973)
- Thomas Joseph Riley (1959–1976)
- Daniel A. Cronin (1968–1970), Bishop of Fall River and later Archbishop of Hartford
- Joseph Francis Maguire (1972–1976), Coadjutor Bishop of Springfield in Massachusetts and subsequently succeeded to that see
- Lawrence Joseph Riley (1972–1990)
- Joseph John Ruocco (1975–1980)
- Thomas Vose Daily (1975–1984), Bishop of Palm Beach and later Bishop of Brooklyn
- John Joseph Mulcahy (1975–1992)
- John Michael D'Arcy (1975–1985), Bishop of Fort Wayne-South Bend
- Daniel Anthony Hart (1976–1995), Bishop of Norwich
- Alfred C. Hughes (1981–1993), Bishop of Baton Rouge and later Archbishop of New Orleans
- Robert J. Banks (1985–1990), Bishop of Green Bay
- Roberto Octavio González Nieves (1988–1995), Coadjutor Bishop of Corpus Christi and subsequently succeeded to that see, and later Archbishop of San Juan in Puerto Rico
- John R. McNamara (1992–1999)
- John P. Boles (1992–2006)
- John Brendan McCormack (1995–1998), Bishop of Manchester
- William F. Murphy (1995–2001), Bishop of Rockville Centre
- Francis Xavier Irwin (1996–2009)
- Emilio S. Allué (1996–2010)
- Richard Joseph Malone (2000–2004), Bishop of Portland and later Bishop of Buffalo
- Richard Lennon (2001–2006), Bishop of Cleveland
- Walter James Edyvean (2001–2014)
- John Anthony Dooher (2006–2018)
- Arthur L. Kennedy (2010–2017)
- Robert P. Deeley (2013–2014), Bishop of Portland
- Mark William O'Connell (2016–2025), Bishop of Albany

=== Other archdiocesan priests who became bishops ===
- William Barber Tyler, Bishop of Hartford in 1843
- Patrick Thomas O'Reilly, Bishop of Springfield in Massachusetts in 1870
- James Augustine Healy, Bishop of Portland in 1875
- Lawrence Stephen McMahon (priest here, 1860–1872), appointed Bishop of Hartford in 1879
- Matthew Harkins, Bishop of Providence in 1887
- Edward Patrick Allen, Bishop of Mobile in 1897
- Louis Sebastian Walsh, Bishop of Portland in 1906
- John Joseph Nilan, Bishop of Hartford in 1910
- James Anthony Walsh, Superior General of Maryknoll and consecrated Titular Bishop in 1933
- Edward Francis Ryan, Bishop of Burlington in 1944
- John Joseph Glynn, Auxiliary Bishop for the Military Services, USA in 1991
- Richard Joseph Malone, Bishop of Portland in 2002 and later Bishop of Buffalo in 2012
- Christopher J. Coyne, Auxiliary Bishop of Indianapolis in 2011 and later Bishop of Burlington and Coadjutor Archbishop of Hartford in 2023 and succeeded to Archbishop of Hartford in 2024
- Paul Fitzpatrick Russell, Apostolic Nuncio to Turkey and Turkmenistan and Titular Archbishop in 2016

== Seminaries ==
- Pope St. John XXIII National Seminary, Weston
- St. John's Seminary, Brighton
- Redemptoris Mater Archdiocesan Missionary Seminary, Brookline

== Education ==
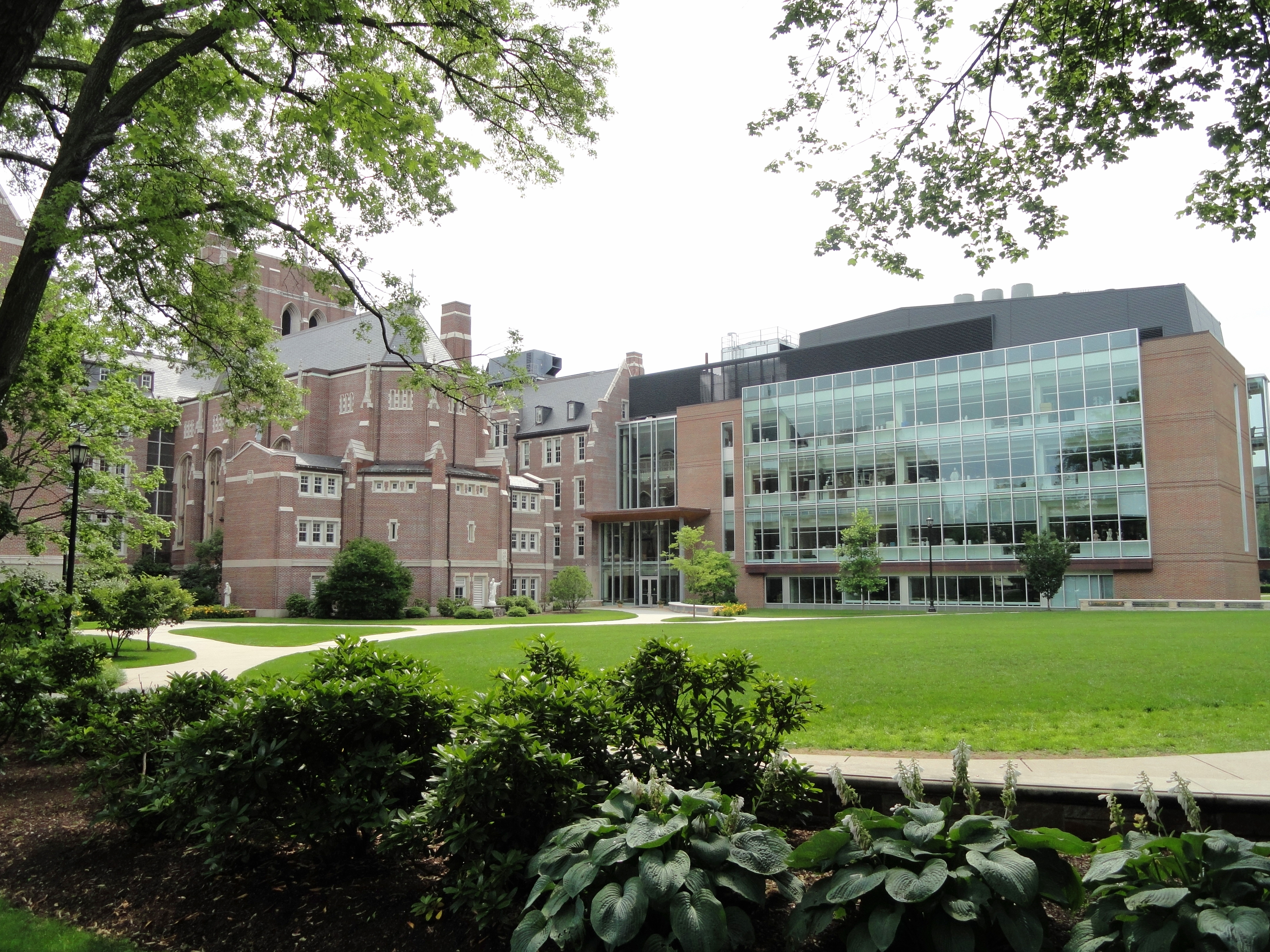
Emmanuel College, Boston, Massachusetts (2011)

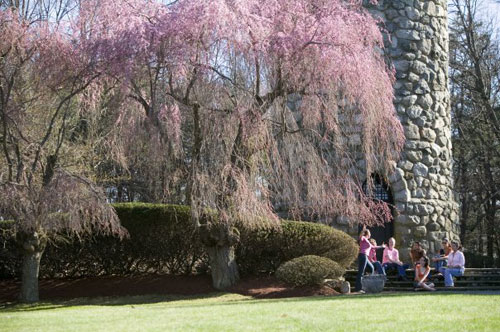
Regis College, Weston, Massachusetts (2011)

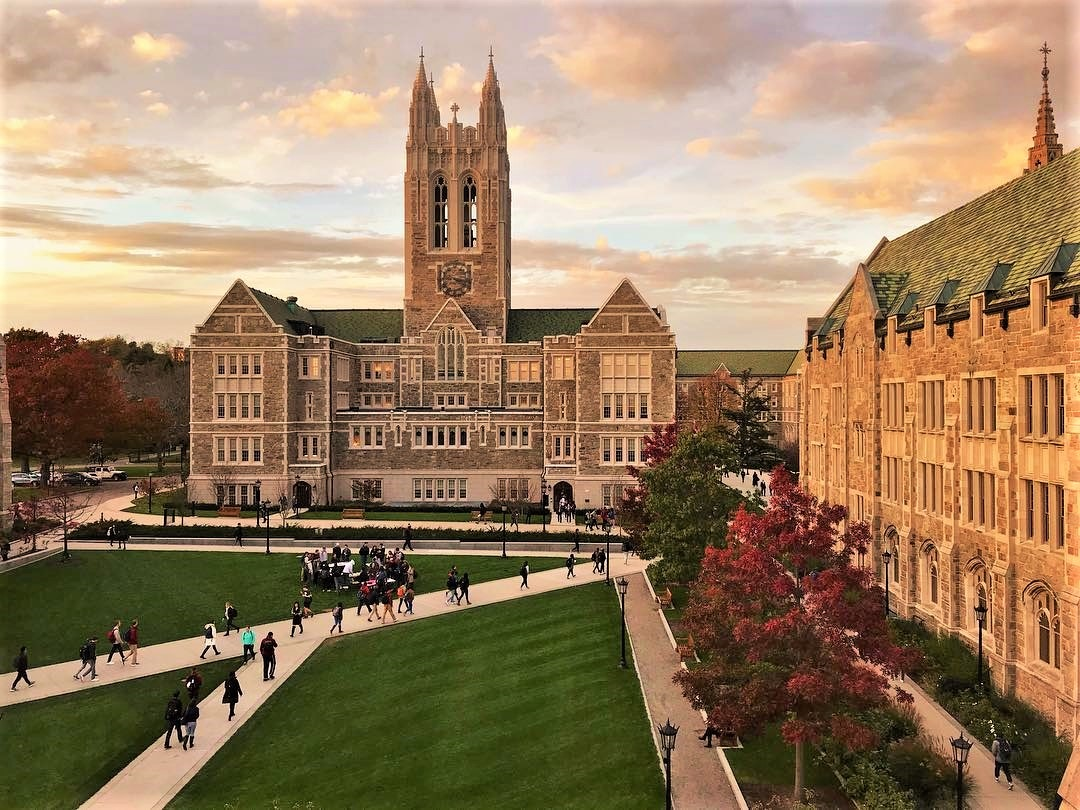
Boston College, Boston, Massachusetts (2018)

As of 2025, the archdiocese had 92 schools with approximately 32,000 students taught by 3,000 faculty members in pre-kindergarten through high school.

In 1993, the archdiocese had 53,569 students in 195 schools. Boston had the largest number of parochial schools: 48 schools with 16,000 students.

=== Colleges and universities ===
- Boston College, Chestnut Hill
- Emmanuel College, Boston
- Merrimack College, North Andover
- Regis College, Weston

=== High schools ===
School	Location	Affiliation with religious order or independent	Founded
Academy of Notre Dame	Tyngsboro	Sisters of Notre Dame de Namur	1854
Archbishop Williams High School	Braintree	Independent	1949
Arlington Catholic High School	Arlington	Independent	1960
Austin Preparatory School	Reading	Independent	1961
Bishop Fenwick High School	Peabody	Independent	1958
BC High	Dorchester (Boston)	Society of Jesus	1863
Cardinal Spellman High School	Brockton	Independent	1958
Cathedral High School	South End (Boston)	Independent	1926
Catholic Memorial	West Roxbury (Boston)	Congregation of Christian Brothers	1957
Central Catholic High School	Lawrence	Marist Brothers	1935
Fontbonne Academy	Milton	Sisters of St. Joseph	1954
Lowell Catholic	Lowell	Xaverian Brothers	1989
Malden Catholic	Malden	Xaverian Brothers	1968
Newton Country Day School of the Sacred Heart	Newton	Society of the Sacred Heart	1880
Notre Dame Academy	Hingham	Sisters of Notre Dame de Namur	1853
Notre Dame Cristo Rey High School	Lawrence	Sisters of Notre Dame de Namur	2004
Saint Joseph Preparatory Boston	Brighton (Boston)	Sisters of St. Joseph	2012
Saint Sebastian's School	Needham	Independent	1941
St. John's Prep	Danvers	Xaverian Brothers	1907
St. Mary's Lynn	Lynn	Independent	1881
Ursuline Academy	Dedham	Ursuline Sisters	1819
Xaverian Brothers High School	Westwood	Xaverian Brothers	1963

== Other facilities ==
The archdiocese previously used a headquarters facility in Brighton but sold it to Boston College in 2004 for $107,400,000.Steward Health Care System operates the former archdiocesan hospitals of Caritas Christi Health Care.

== Sources ==
- Clarke, Richard H. (1872). "Rt. Rev. Benedict Joseph Fenwick, D.D.". Lives of the Deceased Bishops of the Catholic Church in the United States. Vol. 1. New York: P. O'Shea. pp. 374–413. OCLC 809578529 – via Internet Archive.
- Lord, Robert H. (July 1936). "The Organizer of the Church in New England: Bishop Benedict Joseph Fenwick (1782–1846)". The Catholic Historical Review. 22 (2): 172–184. JSTOR 25013478.
- O'Connor, Thomas H. (1998). Boston Catholics: A History of the Church and Its People. Boston: Northeastern University Press. ISBN 1-55553-359-0 – via Internet Archive.
- Tager, Jack (2001). Boston Riots: Three Centuries of Social Violence. Boston: Northeastern University Press. ISBN 1-55553-461-9 – via Internet Archive.
