= John Bernard McDowell =

American prelate

Styles of John Bernard McDowell
- Reference style: The Most Reverend
- Spoken style: Your Excellency
- Religious style: Monsignor

John Bernard McDowell (July 17, 1921 – February 25, 2010) was an American prelate of the Roman Catholic Church who served as auxiliary bishop of the Diocese of Pittsburgh in Pennsylvania from 1966 to 1996.

== Biography ==
McDowell was ordained to the priesthood on November 4, 1945.

On July 19, 1966, McDowell was appointed as auxiliary bishop of Pittsburgh and titular bishop of Tamazuca. He was consecrated by Cardinal John Joseph Wright on September 8, 1966.

Auxiliary Bishop McDowell ordained the future Cardinal Archbishop of Boston, Seán Patrick O'Malley, O.F.M. Cap., to the priesthood on August 29, 1970.

McDowell retired on September 9, 1996.

Catholic Church titles
Preceded by –	Auxiliary Bishop of Pittsburgh; 1966 — 1996	Succeeded by –
