= Arlington Catholic High School =

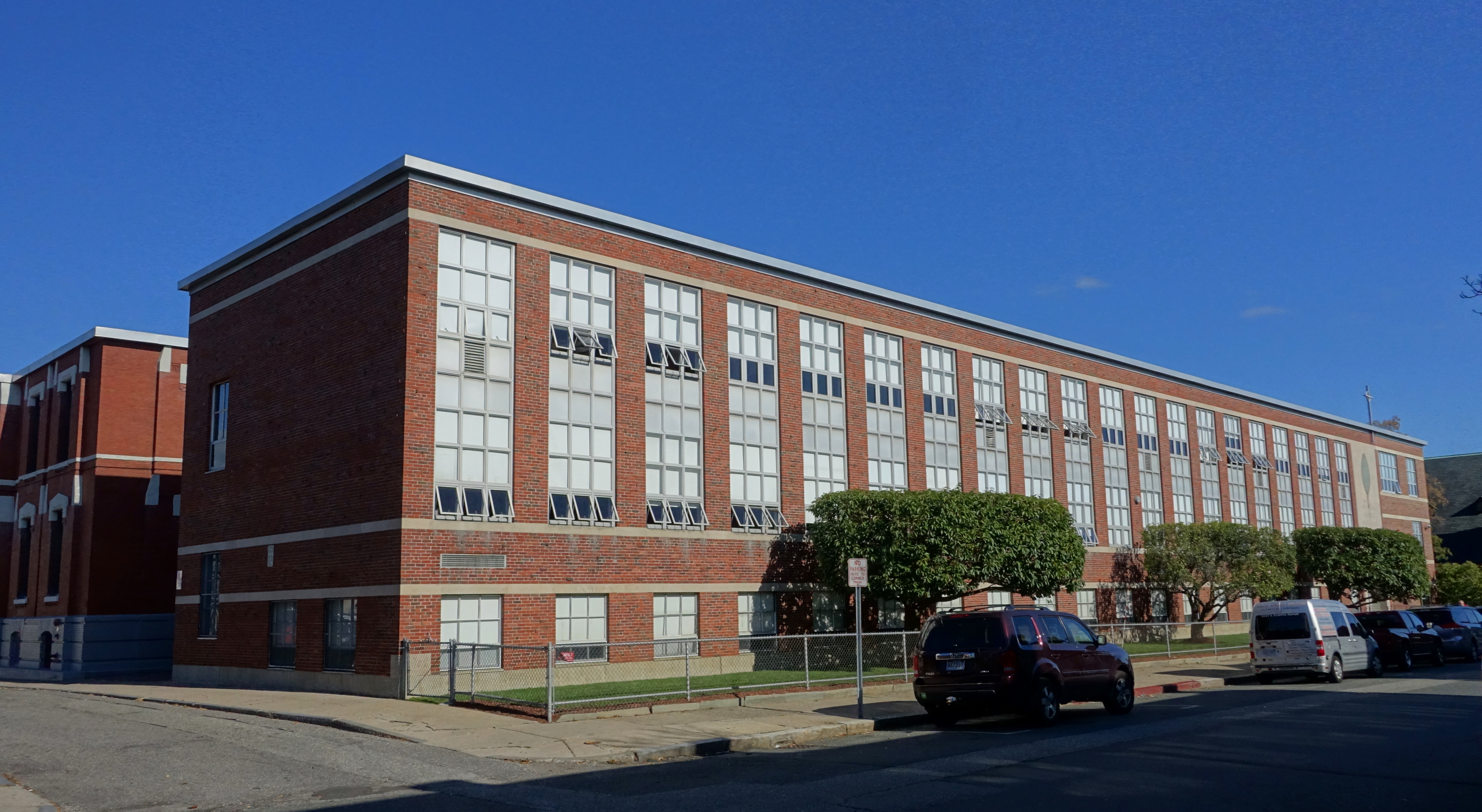

Location
- 16 Medford Street; Arlington, Massachusetts 02474; United States; 42°24′56″N 71°9′3″W

Information
- Type: Private, coeducational
- Motto: "Accept the Challenge"
- Religious affiliation: Roman Catholic
- Established: 1960
- Founder: Oscar O'Gorman
- Principal: John Graceffa
- Faculty: 70
- Grades: 9–12
- Enrollment: 791 (2008)
- Colors: Blue and gold
- Athletics conference: Catholic Central League
- Nickname: Cougars
- Accreditation: New England Association of Schools and Colleges
- Publication: Imaginary Gardens (literary magazine)
- Newspaper: Cougar Growl
- Website: School website

Arlington Catholic High School (ACHS) is a coeducational Catholic high school in Arlington, Massachusetts. It is located in the Roman Catholic Archdiocese of Boston and serves grades 9-12.

== History ==
The members of St. Agnes Parish, a Catholic church in Arlington, established the school in 1960. Monsignor Oscar O'Gorman headed the school's development. Initially the school had 9th grade students. The rear of the school building includes a portion of the Russell School, a Victorian-style school building first built in 1873. In 1956 Russell School closed due to the opening of nearby Francis E. Thompson Elementary School, and the first and second floors of the building were built into the Arlington Catholic facility.

Arlington Catholic's first class graduated in 1964.

== Student body ==
As of 2017 the school has about 650 students, including American students and students who were citizens of eight other countries. Students reside in over 47 communities in the area. Over 50 churches within the Roman Catholic Archdiocese of Boston had members who were students.

== Allegations of sexual abuse ==
Allegations of sexual abuse and a cover-up led to a lawsuit in 2023. It alleged that, between the years of 2011 and 2016, the man who was vice principal and later principal of the school sexually abused 3 students at the school. Local church leaders, including Boston Archbishop Sean Patrick O'Malley, were named as defendants in the lawsuit as well and were accused of being participants in the abuse cover-up. A similar lawsuit was filed in 2022, which detailed alleged abuse that occurred between 1999 and 2001. The principal was placed on administrative leave in 2016, pending the outcome of an investigation into an undisclosed incident. He did not return to the school. Separate allegations emerged in 2023—a teacher who had spent several years at the school and attained a position of power as head of the Mathematics program resigned due to "inappropriate conduct" with students.

== Athletics and student culture ==
As of 2017 the school's athletic program has twenty-six sports which have varsity-level teams.

In addition there are twenty-three activity programs and student clubs.

== Notable alumni ==
- Vicki Movsessian '90 - US Women's Hockey Team Olympic gold medalist in Nagano in 1998
- Julianne Nicholson '89 - actress; won Primetime Emmy Award for her role in HBO's Mare of Easttown (Law & Order: Criminal Intent)
- Mark J. Sullivan '72 - former Director of the United States Secret Service
