= Timidana =

Timidana is a titular see of the Roman Catholic Church.

Coat of arms of Arthur Leo Kennedy.

Timindana was founded during the Roman Empire, but the seat of the diocese is now lost to history, though it is known to be located in the Roman province of Mauretania Caesariensis in today's northern Algeria.

The only known bishop of antiquity in this diocese is Securo, who took part in the synod assembled in Carthage in 484 by the Vandal King Huneric, after which Securo was exiled.

Although the bishopric did not survive the Muslim conquest of the Maghreb, Timidana survives today as a titular bishopric and the current bishop is the auxiliary bishop emeritus of Boston, Arthur Leo Kennedy who replaced Walter Joseph Schoenherr in April 2007.
