= Seán Patrick O'Malley =

American Catholic prelate (born 1944)

His Eminence Seán Patrick O'Malley OFM Cap
- Cardinal, Archbishop Emeritus of Boston
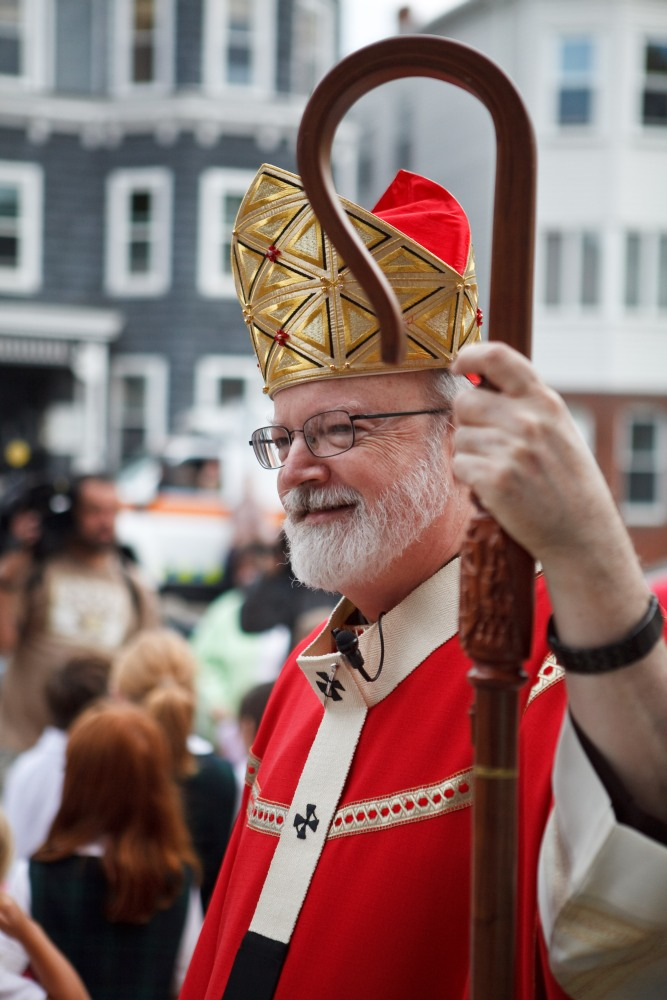
- O'Malley in 2009 outside Gate of Heaven Church, South Boston
- Church: Catholic
- Archdiocese: Boston
- Appointed: July 1, 2003
- Installed: July 30, 2003
- Retired: August 5, 2024
- Predecessor: Bernard Francis Law
- Successor: Richard Henning
- Other posts: Cardinal-Priest of S. Maria della Vittoria (2006–); Member, Council of Cardinals (2013–)
- Previous post: Coadjutor Bishop of Saint Thomas (1984–1985); Bishop of Saint Thomas (1985–1992); Bishop of Fall River (1992–2002); Bishop of Palm Beach (2002–2003); President, Pontifical Commission for the Protection of Minors (2014–2025)

Orders
- Ordination: August 29, 1970 by John Bernard McDowell
- Consecration: August 2, 1984 by Edward John Harper, James Aloysius Hickey, and Eugene Antonio Marino
- Created cardinal: March 24, 2006 by Pope Benedict XVI
- Rank: Cardinal-Priest

Personal details
- Born: Patrick O'Malley; June 29, 1944 (age 82) Lakewood, Ohio, US
- Denomination: Catholic Church
- Education: Catholic University of America
- Motto: Quodcumque dixerit facite (Latin for 'Do whatever He says')
- Styles
- Reference style: His Eminence; The Most Reverend Eminence
- Spoken style: Your Eminence
- Religious style: Cardinal
- Informal style: Cardinal

Ordination history
History
Priestly ordination
- Ordained by: John Bernard McDowell
- Date: August 29, 1970
Episcopal consecration
- Principal consecrator: Edward John Harper CSsR
- Co-consecrators: James Aloysius Hickey; Eugene Antonio Marino SSJ
- Date: August 2, 1984
Episcopal succession
Bishops consecrated by Seán Patrick O'Malley as principal consecrator
- John Anthony Dooher: December 12, 2006
- Robert Francis Hennessey: December 12, 2006
- Arthur Leo Kennedy: September 14, 2010
- Peter John Uglietto: September 14, 2010
- Donald Francis Lippert OFM Cap: February 4, 2012
- Robert Deeley: January 4, 2013
- Paul Fitzpatrick Russell: June 3, 2016
- Robert Philip Reed: June 3, 2016
- Mark William O'Connell: June 3, 2016
- William Draper Byrne: December 14, 2020
- Cristiano Guilherme Borro Barbosa: February 3, 2024
- James Thomas Ruggieri: May 7, 2024

Seán Patrick O'Malley OFM Cap (born June 29, 1944) is an American Catholic prelate who served as Archbishop of Boston from 2003 to 2024 and president of the Pontifical Commission for the Protection of Minors from 2014 to 2025. He is also a founding member of the Council of Cardinals, formed by Pope Francis in 2013. A member of the Order of Friars Minor Capuchin, he was made a cardinal by Pope Benedict XVI in 2006.

O'Malley was previously Bishop of Palm Beach from 2002 to 2003, Bishop of Fall River from 1992 to 2002, and Bishop of Saint Thomas from 1985 to 1992, after more than a year there as coadjutor.

== Biography ==
=== Early life ===
Patrick O'Malley was born on June 29, 1944, in Lakewood, Ohio, the son of Theodore and Mary Louise (née Reidy) O'Malley. Both parents were of Irish descent. O'Malley, his sister, and his older brother grew up in the South Hills area south of Pittsburgh, Pennsylvania, and in Reading, Pennsylvania. At age 12, he entered St. Fidelis High School Seminary in Herman, Pennsylvania, a boarding school for students who were considering joining the Franciscan order. While there, in addition to studying the normal high school subjects, he also studied Spanish, Portuguese, Greek, German, and Hebrew, while also being active in theatre.

After graduating from St. Fidelis, O'Malley attended Capuchin College and the Catholic University of America (CUA), both in Washington, D.C. On July 14, 1965, at age 21, O'Malley professed his vows in the Order of Friars Minor Capuchin and took the name Seán in honor of John the Apostle. He took his perpetual vows with the Capuchins in 1968.

As a subdeacon in 1968, he spent several months ministering with the Capuchins in the mountainous area around Utuado, Puerto Rico. After he was ordained a deacon, the Capuchins originally planned to send O'Malley to work in their missions on Easter Island, Chile; he even learned the local language, Rapa Nui, in preparation. However, before he could leave, the Archbishop of Washington asked O'Malley's provincial superior to keep him in Washington to work with an influx of thousands of Central American refugees.

=== Priesthood ===
O'Malley was ordained a priest for the Capuchins at St. Augustine Church in Pittsburgh on August 29, 1970, at age 26, by Auxiliary Bishop John McDowell. After his ordination, O'Malley graduated from CUA with a master's degree in religious education and a Ph.D. in Spanish and Portuguese literature. He served as a professor at CUA from 1969 to 1973.

After finishing at CUA, the Capuchins asked O'Malley to minister to Latinos at the Spanish Catholic Center in Washington, D.C. He opened a Spanish bookstore there and founded El Pregonero, the first Spanish language newspaper in the area. O'Malley reports that he says his daily prayers in Spanish.

In 1978, Cardinal William Baum appointed O'Malley as episcopal vicar for the Portuguese, Hispanic, and Haitian communities in the Archdiocese of Washington. Baum also appointed him as executive director of the archdiocesan Office of Social Ministry.

O'Malley later called his time in Washington an "uplifting experience and indeed a privilege and honeymoon of my priesthood”. He said that it led him to develop a lifelong commitment to social justice and the care of new immigrants.

=== Bishop of Saint Thomas ===
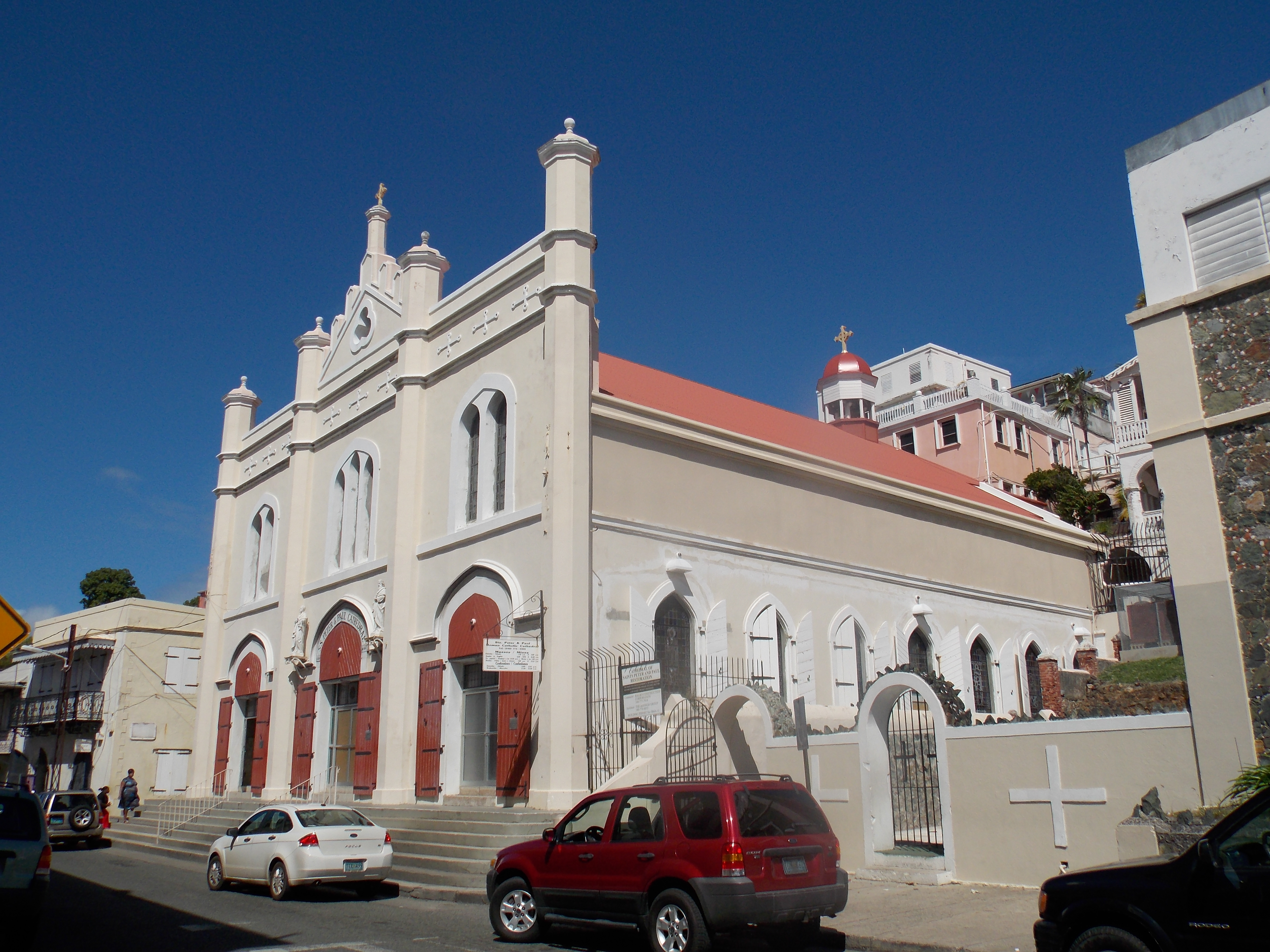
Saints Peter and Paul Cathedral, St. Thomas, US Virgin Islands (2015)

O'Malley was appointed coadjutor bishop of Saint Thomas on June 2, 1984, by Pope John Paul II. He received his episcopal consecration on August 2, 1984, from Bishop Edward Harper, with Archbishop James Hickey and Bishop Eugene Marino serving as co-consecrators. He was the first bishop of St. Thomas to be ordained on the Island of St. Thomas. O'Malley succeeded as bishop of Saint Thomas on October 16, 1985, when John Paul II accepted Harper's resignation.

O'Malley describes the Diocese of St. Thomas as a missionary diocese when he arrived, with a total annual budget of only $30,000. One of his first endeavors was to establish a Catholic newspaper, The Catholic Islander (now a triennial magazine), and a television station to unify the diocese across the islands and make people more aware of what was happening in other parishes.

In 1987, O'Malley established the Bethlehem House shelter for the homeless on St. Thomas and soon after opened a similar shelter on St. Croix. He also established a home for people suffering from HIV/AIDS.

O'Malley described Hurricane Hugo, which struck in 1989, as the biggest challenge of his tenure in the US Virgin Islands. His residence was destroyed and the islands were without water, electricity, and phones for six months and without television for a year.

After an appeal from O'Malley, Tom Monaghan, the founder of Domino's Pizza, sent a plane-load of generators to St. Croix. This was the first plane to land on the island after Hurricane Hugo. With the generators, O'Malley was able to open the Catholic schools in tents almost immediately, while the public schools remained closed for nearly two years.

O'Malley was named an honorary chaplain of the Sovereign Military Order of Malta in 1991.

=== Bishop of Fall River ===
Coat of arms as Bishop of Fall River

On June 16, 1992, John Paul II appointed O'Malley as bishop of Fall River. He was installed on August 11, 1992. As bishop, O'Malley first attempted to settle the sexual abuse scandal in the Fall River diocese.

In 1998, John Paul II appointed O'Malley to the Special Assembly for Oceania of the Synod of Bishops.

=== Bishop of Palm Beach ===
On September 3, 2002, John Paul II appointed O'Malley as bishop of Palm Beach. He was installed on October 19, 2002. O'Malley also tried to overcome the abuse scandal there. He also worked closely with the Portuguese-speaking and Hispanic population there.

=== Archbishop of Boston ===
Coat of Arms as Archbishop of Boston.

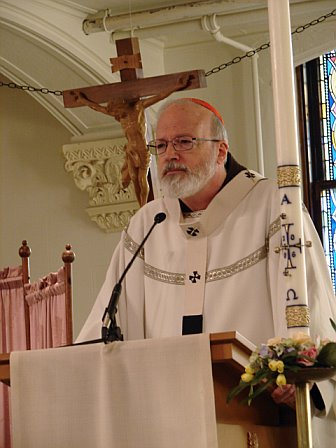
Cardinal O'Malley addresses Harvard University students at St. Paul's Catholic Church, Cambridge, Massachusetts (2006)

Known as a fixer in various Roman Catholic dioceses plagued by sexual abuse scandals, O'Malley was appointed by John Paul II as archbishop of Boston on July 1, 2003. He succeeded Cardinal Bernard Law, who had resigned as archbishop as a consequence of the sexual abuse scandal in the archdiocese.

==== Cardinal ====
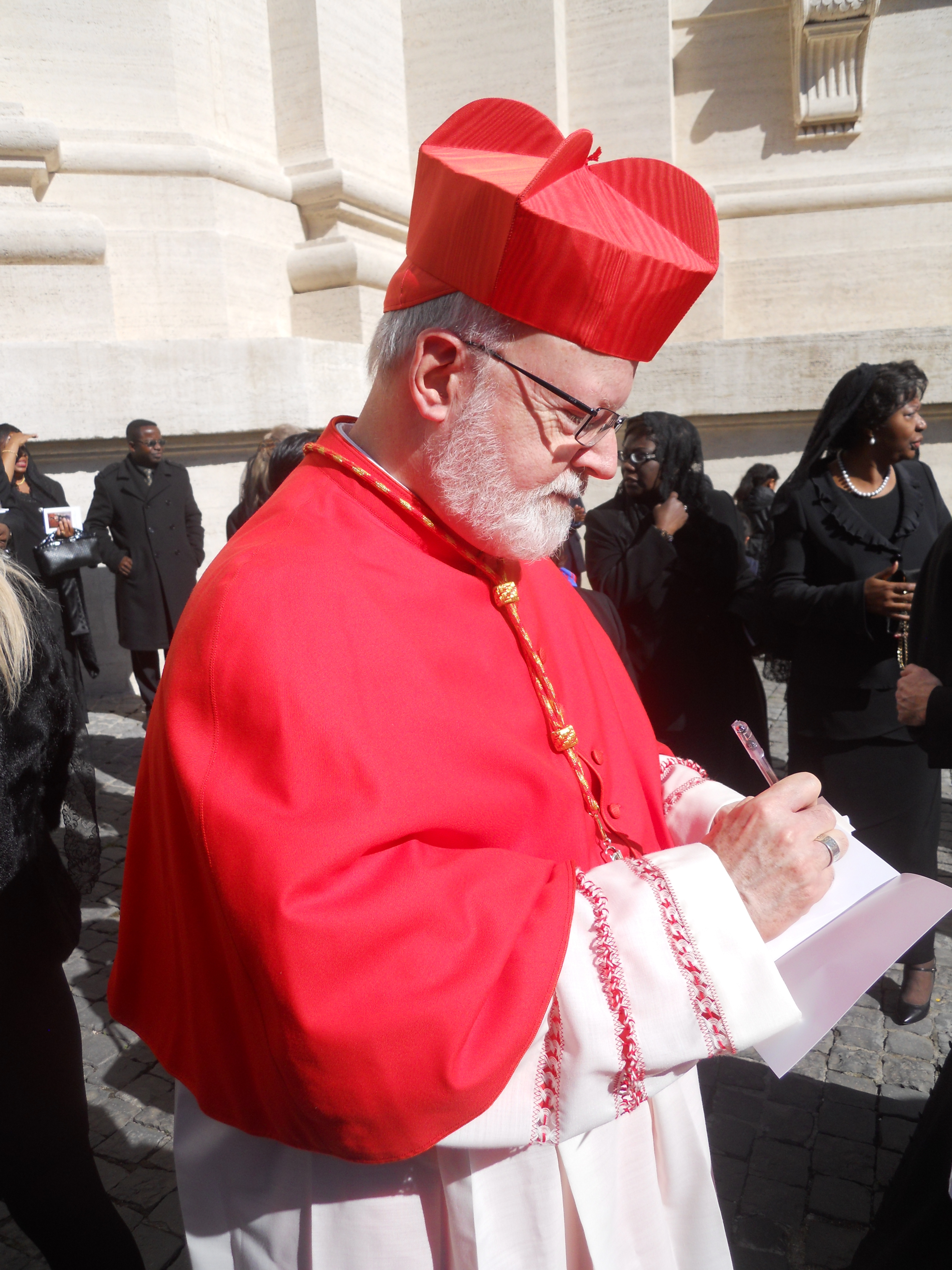
Cardinal O'Malley (2014)

Pope Benedict XVI elevated O'Malley to the rank of cardinal-priest in the consistory of March 24, 2006. O'Malley was assigned the titular church of Santa Maria della Vittoria in Rome. In May 2007, Benedict XVI named O'Malley as a member of both the Congregation for the Clergy and the Congregation for Institutes of Consecrated Life and Societies of Apostolic Life in the Roman Curia. In late September 2009, he became a member of the Presidential Council of the Pontifical Council for the Family.

In September 2006, O'Malley became the first cardinal to create a personal blog. In December 2006, he began offering a regular podcast as well. He viewed the podcasts as "yet another tool [he] can use to reach the young people in our Church who more and more are turning to the Internet for their information."

In June 2010, after the Ryan Report and Murphy Report on the abuses by the Church in Ireland, O'Malley was named along with others to oversee the apostolic visitation of certain dioceses and seminaries in Ireland. O'Malley was named as the visitor to the Archdiocese of Dublin and its suffragan dioceses of Ferns, Ossory, Kildare and Leighlin. He reported back to the Holy See on what steps the dioceses and seminaries had taken since the two reports were issued, and what else needed to happen.

O'Malley participated in the 2013 papal conclave, which elected Pope Francis. During the conclave, O'Malley was considered papabile, a contender for election to the papacy.

On April 13, 2013, O'Malley was appointed to a group of eight cardinals established by Francis a month after his election, to advise him and to study a plan for revising the Apostolic Constitution on the Roman Curia, Pastor bonus. The pope was already in contact with the members of this group. O'Malley accompanied Francis on a papal visit to Cuba on September 20, 2015.

O'Malley praised the new tone of Francis' papacy. He stated, however, that those who expected doctrinal changes from Francis on sexual ethics like abortion, contraception, and same-sex marriage would be disappointed. He also indicated that Francis would not alter the ban on communion for Catholics who divorced, then remarried, and that O'Malley saw no theological justification for doing so.

On March 22, 2014, Francis appointed O'Malley to the Pontifical Commission for the Protection of Minors and on December 17 of that year made him the commission's president.

On January 14, 2017, Pope Francis named O'Malley a member of the Dicastery for the Doctrine of the Faith. On October 15, 2020, the pope renewed O'Malley's term on the Council of Cardinal Advisers.

O’Malley is the Grand Prior of the USA Northeastern Lieutenancy of the Equestrian Order of the Holy Sepulchre of Jerusalem.

=== Retirement ===
In July 2019, the archdiocese announced that O'Malley had agreed to accept Pope Francis' request to remain as archbishop of Boston "for a few more years"; he had submitted his letter of resignation to the pope upon turning 75 years of age, per canon law. Archdiocese spokesperson Terry Donilon said that O'Malley was "really relieved" about the pope's decision and that "He loves being the archbishop of Boston and so we're pleased that that was settled right out of the box." The archdiocese statement also said that

"The Cardinal is pleased to have the continued confidence of the Holy Father and looks forward to continuing to serve the people of God in Boston and in support of the Pope’s ministry in leading the universal church."

In August 2024, as O'Malley approached his 80th birthday, Francis finally accepted O'Malley's resignation as archbishop of Boston. The pope appointed Bishop Richard Henning from the Diocese of Providence as his successor. O'Malley continued to administer the archdiocese as apostolic administrator until Henning's installation on October 31. At Pope Francis' request, he continued to serve as president of the Pontifical Commission for the Protection of Minors. His tenure at that Commission concluded when Pope Leo XIV appointed his successor on July 5, 2025.

== Views ==
=== Abortion ===
In November 2007 interview with the Boston Globe, O'Malley said that the Democratic Party had been persistently hostile to anti-abortion groups. He said the fact that many Catholic voters supported Democratic candidates "border[ed] on scandal."

In a November 2008 interview with the Boston Globe, O'Malley said that he would not deny communion to Catholic politicians in his diocese who supported legalized abortion unless the Vatican formally excommunicated them.

Despite criticism from conservative Catholics, including commentator Raymond Arroyo of Eternal Word Television Network, of his participation in the funeral service for US Senator Ted Kennedy, a long-standing supporter of legalized abortion, O'Malley assisted at the funeral mass and led a prayer. He called for less contentious political dialogue: "We will not change hearts by turning away from people in their time of need and when they are experiencing grief and loss." He said he appreciated Kennedy's work for social justice, but that "there is a tragic sense of lost opportunity in his lack of support for the unborn".

=== Caritas Christi and abortion services ===
In 2009, Caritas Christi Health Care, which the Archdiocese of Boston owned, proposed contracting with Centene Corporation, a Missouri-based health insurer, to provide certain healthcare services, including abortion and pregnancy termination services, through a jointly owned venture named Celticare. The new director of Caritas, Ralph de la Torre, announced the project as part of an effort to relieve the hospital system's financial problems while extending services to low income and underserved populations. In order for Caritas to participate in the Massachusetts state program CommonwealthCare, Caritas needed to provide access to mandated services, including some forbidden by Catholic teaching. Torre explained:

When a patient seeks such a procedure, Caritas healthcare professionals will be clear that (a) the hospital does not perform them and (b) the patient must turn to his or her insurer for further guidance. This, in fact, is the practice currently in place in the Caritas system as we work with other insurance companies under state laws that mandate access to procedures not provided within the Caritas system.

O'Malley asked the National Catholic Bioethical Center in Broomall, Pennsylvania, to review the contractual relationship, which theologians in a survey conducted by The Boston Globe in March had unanimously supported on the grounds that Catholic hospitals would not participate directly in providing abortion and the arrangement would allow Caritas to deliver much-needed services to the poor. The Catholic Action League of Massachusetts criticized the arrangement:

"With Caritas Christi now thoroughly embedded in the culture of death, we are now facing the end, in Massachusetts at least, of Catholic medical resistance to abortion and contraception. This tragic state of affairs is the personal responsibility of the Archbishop of Boston, Cardinal Sean O'Malley."

In June 2009, Caritas Christi, at O'Malley's insistence, terminated its partial ownership of Celticare. O'Malley said:

Throughout this process, our singular goal has been to provide for the needs of the poor and under-served in a manner that is fully and completely in accord with Catholic moral teaching. By withdrawing from the joint venture and serving the poor as a provider ... upholding Catholic moral teaching at all times, they are able to carry forward the critical mission of Catholic health care.

Anti-abortion activist groups varied in their responses. Some praised O'Malley's decision, but others continued to object that Caritas, as a participant in CommonwealthCare, is still required, even as it refuses to provide abortions, to engage in abortion referrals.

=== Middle East ===
In August 2014, O'Malley expressed support for Christians facing persecution in Sudan. He also offered his prayers for Christians who being forced out of their homes in Mosul in Iraq by Islamic State fighters who were occupying the city.

=== Same sex marriage and adoptions ===
O'Malley in March 2004 expressed his support for the Marriage Affirmation and Protection Amendment that was being proposed as a ballot member to reverse the recent legalization of same-sex marriage in Massachusetts. The initiative was defeated.

Massachusetts has included sexual orientation in its anti-discrimination statute since 1989, and it legalized same-sex marriage beginning May 17, 2004. Between about 1985 and 1995, Catholic Charities of Boston, which accepted state funds in support of its adoption services program, placed 13 children with same-sex couples out of 720 adoptions. Catholic Charities President J. Bryan Hehir explained the practice: "If we could design the system ourselves, we would not participate in adoptions to gay couples, but we can't. We have to balance various goods."

In December 2005, the lay-dominated board of Catholic Charities of Boston voted unanimously to continue adoptions by same-sex couples. On March 10, 2006, after unsuccessfully seeking help from Massachusetts Governor Mitt Romney in obtaining an exemption from the state's anti-discrimination statute, O'Malley and leaders of Catholic Charities announced that the agency would terminate its adoption work effective June 30, rather than continue to place children under the guardianship of LGBT couples. He said "This is a difficult and sad day for Catholic Charities. We have been doing adoptions for more than 100 years."

=== Leadership Conference of Women Religious ===
On October 1, 2009, O'Malley wrote a letter on behalf of the Committee on Clergy, Consecrated Life and Vocations of the United States Conference of Catholic Bishops (USCCB) to the Leadership Conference of Women Religious (LCWR). At that time, the LCWR was under investigation by the Congregation for the Doctrine of the Faith in Rome. In his letter, O'Malley praised a traveling exhibition created by LCWR that documented the work of religious sisters in the United States. He wrote that;

"The Church is grateful for all that your communities have done and continue to do to advance the mission of the Church, especially in the areas of health care, education, social services, and pastoral ministry, as are highlighted in the exhibit".

=== Racism ===
On the subject of reparations to the descendants of enslaved peoples in the United States, O'Malley suggested in March 2020, just before St. Patrick's Day, that providing educational opportunities to these people might be an answer. He characterized St. Patrick as the first abolitionist. In May 2021, during Asian American and Pacific Islander Heritage Month, O'Malley condemned violence on Asian-Americans and racism in general,

Racism perpetuates a basic untruth that purports an innate superiority of one group over another because of skin color, culture, or ethnicity. This attitude contradicts the biblical understanding of God's action in creation, whereby all human beings are made in image and likeness of God. Racism denies the dignity of each human being, revealed in the mystery of the Incarnation, and blasphemes the redemptive act of Christ, who died on the cross to save all people.

=== Sexual abuse ===
O'Malley, who replaced two previous bishops of Palm Beach that resigned after admitting to the molestation of children, instituted a system in which abuse allegations were referred to a social worker outside the church, and initiated a zero tolerance policy against sexual abuse, one of the first comprehensive sexual abuse policies in the Roman Catholic Church.

On December 5, 2013, O'Malley announced a pontifically approved commission, the Pontifical Commission for the Protection of Minors, whose purpose is to prevent clerical sexual abuse and to help victims. When the commission was established on March 22, 2014, O'Malley was named one of its first eight members. He supported the 2015 film Spotlight, which took an in-depth look at the wrongdoings of the Catholic Church in light of sexual abuse scandals.

On May 5, 2023, three former students at Arlington Catholic High School in Arlington, Massachusetts, filed a lawsuit in Suffolk Superior Court. The plaintiffs alleged that O'Malley and others in the archdiocese failed to protect them from a vice principal who sexually abused them. The alleged abuse took place between 2011 and 2016.

==== Theodore McCarrick and St. John's Seminary controversies ====
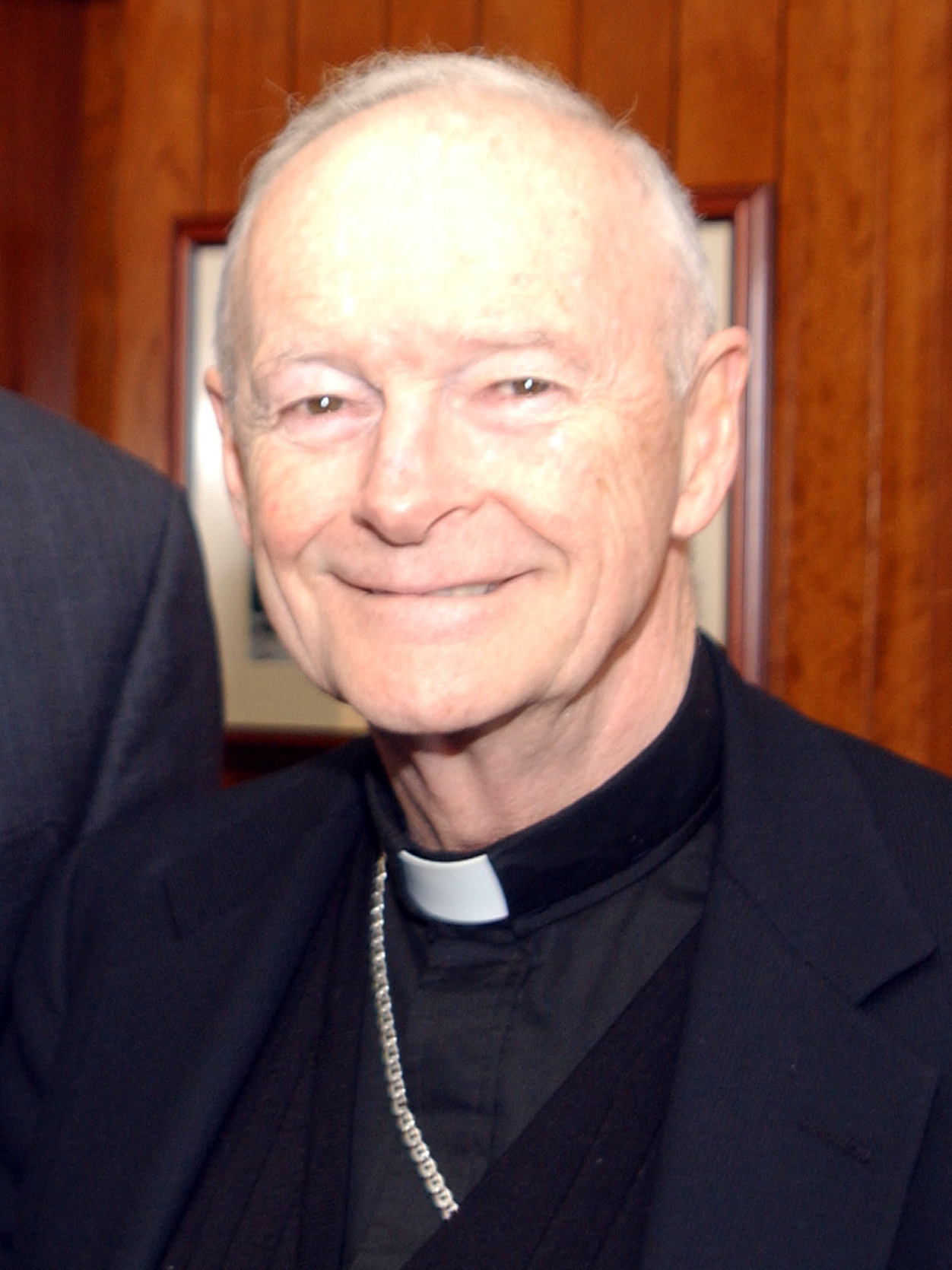
Former Cardinal Theodore McCarrick (2002)

In June 2018, it was revealed that O'Malley never responded to a letter sent to him in June 2015 by Reverend Boniface Ramsey, a New York priest, concerning sex abuse committed by then Cardinal Theodore McCarrick. Despite being required to enforce a zero-tolerance policy with regards to reporting sex abuse, O'Malley said that the archdiocesan staff handled the letter and never forwarded it to him.

Ramsey stated that he had reported the allegations against McCarrick to other Catholic officials before sending his letter to O'Malley. During the time the letter was sent, McCarrick and O'Malley were both working with Cuban Cardinal Jaime Ortega to mend relations between the United States and Cuba. McCarrick also accepted O'Malley's invitation to appear at the archdiocese "Celebration of the Priesthood" fundraising dinner in South Boston in September 2015.

On August 10, 2018, allegations of sexual misconduct surfaced at St. John's Seminary in Boston. On August 15, 2018, the archdiocese announced that O'Malley would not attend the World Meeting of Families in Dublin, Ireland in order to review these allegations. In November 2019, a months-long independent inquiry, led by former U.S. Attorney Donald K. Stern, confirmed there were specific instances of inappropriate conduct at the seminary, but no pervasive culture of excessive drinking or sexual activity.

== Honors ==
- Knight commander of the Order of Prince Henry, Portugal, 1985
- Grand-Cross of the Order of Prince Henry, Portugal (June 28, 2016)

== Bibliography ==
- O'Malley, Sean Patrick (December 2000). Peregrinos e Pastores: Exercicios Espirituai [Pilgrims and Shepherds: Spiritual Exercises] (in Portuguese). Editora Rei dos Livros. ISBN 9725109619.
- O'Malley, Sean Patrick (June 2010). Anel e Sandálias [Rings and Sandals] (in Portuguese). Pauline Books and Media. ISBN 9789896730994. EAN 560-3658113471
- O'Malley, Sean Patrick (June 2019). Gambiarras de Luz [Improvised Lighting] (in Portuguese). Paulinas Editora. ISBN 9789896736996.
- O'Malley, Sean Patrick (February 2022). Wanted: Friends and Footwashers. Paulist Press. ISBN 9780809156368.

== See also ==
- Catholic Church hierarchy
- Catholic Church in the United States
- Historical list of the Catholic bishops of the United States
- List of Catholic bishops of the United States
- Lists of patriarchs, archbishops, and bishops

Catholic Church titles
Preceded by Edward John Harper	Roman Catholic Bishop of St Thomas; 1985–1992	Succeeded by Elliot Griffin Thomas
Preceded by Daniel Anthony Cronin	Roman Catholic Bishop of Fall River; 1992–2002	Succeeded by George William Coleman
Preceded by Anthony O'Connell	Roman Catholic Bishop of Palm Beach; 2002–2003	Succeeded by Gerald Barbarito
Preceded by Bernard Francis Law	Roman Catholic Archbishop of Boston; 2003–2024	Succeeded by Richard Henning
Preceded by ?	Grand prior of the Northeastern Lieutenancy of the Order of the Holy Sepulchre; 2003–present	Incumbent
Preceded by Giuseppe Caprio	Cardinal-Priest of Santa Maria della Vittoria; 2006–present	Incumbent
