= James Porter (Catholic priest) =

American priest (1935–2005)

- Born: January 2, 1935; Revere, Massachusetts, U.S.
- Died: February 11, 2005 (aged 70); Tufts-New England Medical Center, Boston, Massachusetts, U.S.
- Occupation: Defrocked priest
- Status: Deceased
- Convictions: Sodomy (6 counts); Indecent assault and battery (27 counts); Unnatural and lascivious acts (7 counts); Assault and battery
- Penalty: 18 to 20 years imprisonment

James Porter (January 2, 1935 – February 11, 2005) was a Roman Catholic ex-priest who was convicted of molesting 28 children; he admitted to sexually abusing at least 100 children of both sexes over a period of 30 years, starting in the 1960s.

== Early life ==
Porter started both training for the priesthood and molesting children at a young age; he abused his earliest known victim in 1953, the summer before he entered seminary. He was ordained in 1959 and became a priest of the diocese of Fall River, Massachusetts.

== Crimes ==
Porter was assigned to St. Mary's parochial grammar school in North Attleboro, Massachusetts in April 1960 and put in charge of the altar boys. Porter gained a reputation there as a child molester, but no action was taken against him by the Catholic Church until 1963, by which time at least four parents had complained to his superiors about his inappropriate behavior. Rather than contact the police, however, Church officials moved Porter to a parish in Fall River, where further complaints about his behavior surfaced. In the early 1960s, Porter abused more than 60 North Attleboro children, and nearly 100 in southeastern Massachusetts.

In 1964, Porter was arrested for molesting a 13-year-old boy and sent to a mental institution for 13 months. Once released, he was quickly reassigned to another parish, the first of many such reassignments over the years. He was shuffled into two more parishes before more accusations piled up and he was hospitalized again in 1967, this time to a hospital run by fellow priests who practiced holistic psychotherapy upon its patients, many of whom were clergy members suffering from psychological problems. Porter's "problem" was not unique among the hospital's patients; two of them were later imprisoned for abusing, between them, hundreds of children.

Porter was released after a few months, once again declared cured, and given probationary assignments in parishes in Texas, New Mexico and Minnesota, all of which included access to children. Complaints surfaced by the dozen against Porter, but none of them resulted in disciplinary action beyond his being moved from post to post.

In 1973, Porter wrote a letter to Pope Paul VI requesting to be released from the priesthood, in which he admitted molesting children across five states. The Pope granted his request and, in 1974, Porter gave up his collar. He married, and eventually settled in Minnesota. He and his wife, Verlyne (née Bartlett), had four children. Following Porter's arrest years later, his family revealed that he was often emotionally and physically abusive toward them; Porter's son Sean also told authorities that his father had sexually abused him.

== Caught ==
In 1990, Frank Fitzpatrick went public with accusations that Porter had molested him as a child in the 1960s. Over the next two years, Fitzpatrick contacted the state police, the FBI, and the media. No one agreed to help him. He eventually reached attorney Roderick MacLeish, who had won a large sexual abuse case that year. MacLeish agreed to take the case on. He arranged for Fitzpatrick and five other Porter victims to talk to Joe Bergantino, an investigative reporter for WBZ-TV. Bergantino's piece—which included a confession from Porter that he molested dozens of children—attracted national news and eventually more than 100 victims came forward to accuse Porter. The Boston Globe published more than 100 articles about the case. In 1992, a series of investigative reports by ABC News producer Grace Kahng on Porter's crimes aired on Primetime Live, hosted by Diane Sawyer, which sparked national attention.

The initial Primetime Live broadcast noted that Porter had abused over 100 children in Massachusetts. Sawyer interviewed 30 adults who had been raped as elementary school children by Porter. The investigation and documents obtained by MacLeish revealed that instead of removing Porter after parents reported the abuse, the Catholic Church had moved him to a treatment center and then to Bemidji, Minnesota, where he continued to rape dozens of children. Primetime Live interviewed 30 of Porter's victims and their parents, and confronted the priest who had transferred Porter from Massachusetts to Minnesota knowing of his crimes. They also contacted Porter himself, who still had contact with children as a Sunday school teacher at his church. The ABC News investigation discovered and interviewed a local babysitter who said Porter had sexually abused her in 1984. After the report aired, it was discovered that Porter had also molested the babysitter's younger sister, a crime that was within the statute of limitations. This development allowed local Minnesota authorities to finally arrest Porter. Before Porter's arrest, Sawyer and her producer confronted the former priest at a local carnival.

== Arrest and first conviction ==
Within weeks of the ABC News broadcast, Porter was arrested, tried and convicted of sexually abusing his children's babysitter. He served four months of a six-month prison sentence before his conviction was overturned by the Minnesota Supreme Court.

The Porter case caused a national outcry and the U.S. Conference of Bishops adopted new guidelines for handling priests charged with child molestation.

== Second conviction and imprisonment ==
By 1993, dozens of lawsuits had cropped up against Porter in Minnesota, Texas and New Mexico; in Minnesota alone, he was charged with over 200 counts of sexual abuse. Porter's lawyer struck a plea bargain on 41 charges, and Porter was sentenced to 18 to 20 years in prison, with the possibility of parole, with counseling, after six years. Parole was consistently denied for several years. Porter completed his prison sentence in 2004, but was held until his death pending a civil commitment hearing.

== Death ==
Porter died on February 11, 2005, of cancer at New England Medical Center in Boston, where he had been transferred the month before from a Massachusetts hospital.

== In popular culture ==
The 1995 Law & Order episode "Bad Faith" and the 2010 Law & Order: UK episode "Confession" were based on Porter's case. His crimes were also referenced in the 2015 film Spotlight.
