= Lawrence Joseph Riley =

American Roman Catholic bishop

His Excellency, The Most Reverend Lawrence Joseph Riley
- Auxiliary Bishop of Boston; Titular Bishop of Daimlaig
- Church: Catholic Church; Latin Church
- Archdiocese: Boston

Orders
- Ordination: September 21, 1940 by Richard Cushing
- Consecration: December 7, 1971 by Humberto Sousa Medeiros

Personal details
- Born: September 6, 1914 Boston, Massachusetts, US
- Died: December 2, 2001 (aged 87) Boston
- Education: Pontifical Gregorian University; Catholic University of America
- Motto: Mane nobiscum, Domine (Stay with us, Lord)

Lawrence Joseph Riley (September 6, 1914 – December 2, 2001) was an American prelate of the Roman Catholic Church in the United States. He served as an auxiliary bishop of the Archdiocese of Boston in Massachusetts from 1971 to 1990

== Early life ==
Lawrence Riley was born on September 6, 1914, in Boston, Massachusetts. He resided in Rome at the Pontifical North American College while studying at the Pontifical Gregorian University. Riley also earned a degree from the Catholic University of America in Washington, D.C.

Riley was ordained to the priesthood at Sacred Heart Church in Newton Centre, Massachusetts, on September 21, 1940, for the Archdiocese of Boston by Bishop Richard Cushing.

== Auxiliary Bishop of Boston ==
On December 7, 1971, Riley was appointed titular bishop of Daimlaig and auxiliary bishop of Boston by Pope Paul VI. Riley was consecrated on February 2, 1972 at the Cathedral of the Holy Cross in Boston by Archbishop Humberto Sousa Medeiros. As auxiliary bishop, he served as pastor of Most Precious Blood Parish in Boston and as bishop of the Central Region of the archdiocese.Pope John Paul II named Riley as an assistant to the papal throne in 1987.

== Retirement and death ==
Riley retired as auxiliary bishop of Boston on January 22, 1990. He died in Boston on December 2, 2001 at age 87. He is buried at Holy Cross Cemetery in Malden, Massachusetts.
