= Walter James Edyvean =

American Catholic bishop (1938–2019)

His Excellency, The Most Reverend Walter James Edyvean
- Auxiliary Bishop Emeritus of Boston; Titular Bishop of Aeliae
- Archdiocese: Boston
- Appointed: June 29, 2001
- Installed: September 14, 2001
- Term ended: June 29, 2014
- Other post: Titular Bishop of Aeliae

Orders
- Ordination: December 16, 1964 by Francis Frederick Reh
- Consecration: September 14, 2001 by Bernard Francis Law, Lawrence Joseph Riley, and William Murphy

Personal details
- Born: October 18, 1938 Medford, Massachusetts, U.S.
- Died: February 2, 2019 (aged 80)

Styles of Walter James Edyvean
- Reference style: His Excellency; The Most Reverend
- Spoken style: Your Excellency
- Religious style: Bishop

Walter James Edyvean (October 18, 1938 – February 2, 2019) was an American prelate of the Roman Catholic Church. He was an auxiliary bishop of the Archdiocese of Boston who served from 2001 to 2014.

== Early life and career ==
Bishop Edyvean was born in Medford, Massachusetts, on October 18, 1938, and was the only child of Walter and Frances Edyvean. He attended local public schools and graduated from high school in 1956. Edyvean attended Boston College, obtaining a bachelor's degree in English literature in 1960. He studied at St. John's Seminary before furthering his studies in Rome at the Pontifical North American College and Pontifical Gregorian University, there earning a baccalaureate (1963) and licentiate in theology (1965). While in Rome, Edyvean was ordained to the priesthood by Bishop Francis Reh on December 16, 1964.

He was an assistant pastor at St. Joseph Church in Ipswich, Massachusetts from 1965 to 1968, and earned a doctorate in theology after further studies in Rome from 1968 to 1971. He was a faculty member of St. John's Seminary from 1971. Edyvean initially taught dogmatic theology before moving into the field of sacramental theology as an ordinary professor.

In 1990 he returned to Rome and was named capo ufficio of the Congregation for Catholic Education in the Roman Curia. Edyvean's role was to deal with Catholic colleges and universities across the world.

== Bishop ==
On June 29, 2001, Edyvean was appointed Auxiliary Bishop of Boston and Titular Bishop of Aeliae by Pope John Paul II. He was appointed at the same time as one of his former students, Richard G. Lennon. Edyvean received his episcopal consecration on the following September 14 at the Cathedral of the Holy Cross, Boston from Bernard Cardinal Law, with Bishops Lawrence Riley and William Murphy serving as co-consecrators. As an auxiliary bishop, he served as Regional Bishop of the West Pastoral Region and vicar general of the Archdiocese.

Thirteen years to the day after his appointment (June 29, 2014), Pope Francis accepted his retirement as Auxiliary Bishop in the Archdiocese of Boston. He died on February 2, 2019.

== See also ==
- Catholic Church hierarchy
- Catholic Church in the United States
- Historical list of the Catholic bishops of the United States
- List of Catholic bishops of the United States
- Lists of patriarchs, archbishops, and bishops

Catholic Church titles
Preceded by –	Auxiliary Bishop Emeritus of Boston; 2014–2019	Succeeded by –
Preceded by –	Auxiliary Bishop of Boston; 2001–2014	Succeeded by –
