= Francis Xavier Irwin =

American prelate (1934–2019)

His Excellency, The Most Reverend Francis Xavier Irwin
- Auxiliary Bishop of Boston; Titular Bishop of Ubaza
- Archdiocese: Boston
- Appointed: July 24, 1996
- Installed: September 17, 1996
- Term ended: October 20, 2009
- Other post: Titular Bishop of Ubaza

Orders
- Ordination: February 2, 1960 by Richard Cushing
- Consecration: September 17, 1996 by Bernard Francis Law; Theodore Edgar McCarrick; Robert Joseph Banks

Personal details
- Born: January 9, 1934 Medford, Massachusetts
- Died: October 30, 2019 (aged 85) Dennis, Massachusetts
- Motto: To live in joyful hope

Styles of Francis Xavier Irwin
- Reference style: His Excellency; The Most Reverend
- Spoken style: Your Excellency
- Religious style: Bishop

Francis Xavier Irwin (January 9, 1934 – October 30, 2019) was an American prelate of the Roman Catholic Church in the United States who served as an auxiliary bishop of the Archdiocese of Boston in Massachusetts from 1996 to 2009.

== Biography ==
=== Early life ===
Francis Irwin was born on January 9, 1934, in Medford, Massachusetts, one of seven children. He attended Boston College High School, then Boston College, and St. John's Seminary, all in Boston.

=== Priesthood ===
Irwin was ordained a priest for the Archdiocese of Boston by Cardinal Richard Cushing at the Cathedral of the Holy Cross in Boston on February 2, 1960.After his ordination, the archdiocese assigned Irwin as assistant pastor at St. Joseph Parish in Boston, St. Mary of the Assumption in Revere, Massachusetts, and then St. Patrick in Lawrence, Massachusetts.

In 1968, Irwin left St. Patrick to study again at Boston College for a degree in social work. Starting in 1970, he assumed a series of positions within Catholic Charities for the archdiocese as well as the archdiocesan social services Department. During this period, he spent 18 months teaching at Fordham University in New York City.

Irwin left his administrative posts in 1993 for an appointment as pastor of St. Agnes Parish in Arlington, Massachusetts.

=== Auxiliary Bishop of Boston ===
Pope John Paul II appointed Irwin as titular bishop of Ubaza and as an auxiliary bishop of Boston on July 24, 1996. He was consecrated by Cardinal Bernard Law at the Cathedral of the Holy Cross on September 17, 1996. As auxiliary bishop, Irwin was the regional bishop of the North Region of the archdiocese.

=== Retirement and death ===
Pope Benedict XVI accepted Irwin's resignation as auxiliary bishop of Boston on October 20, 2009.He died on October 30, 2019, at his home on Cape Cod in Massachusetts.
