= Pope St. John XXIII National Seminary =

Catholic seminary in Weston, Massachusetts

Coordinates: 42°20′22.71″N 71°18′39.49″W

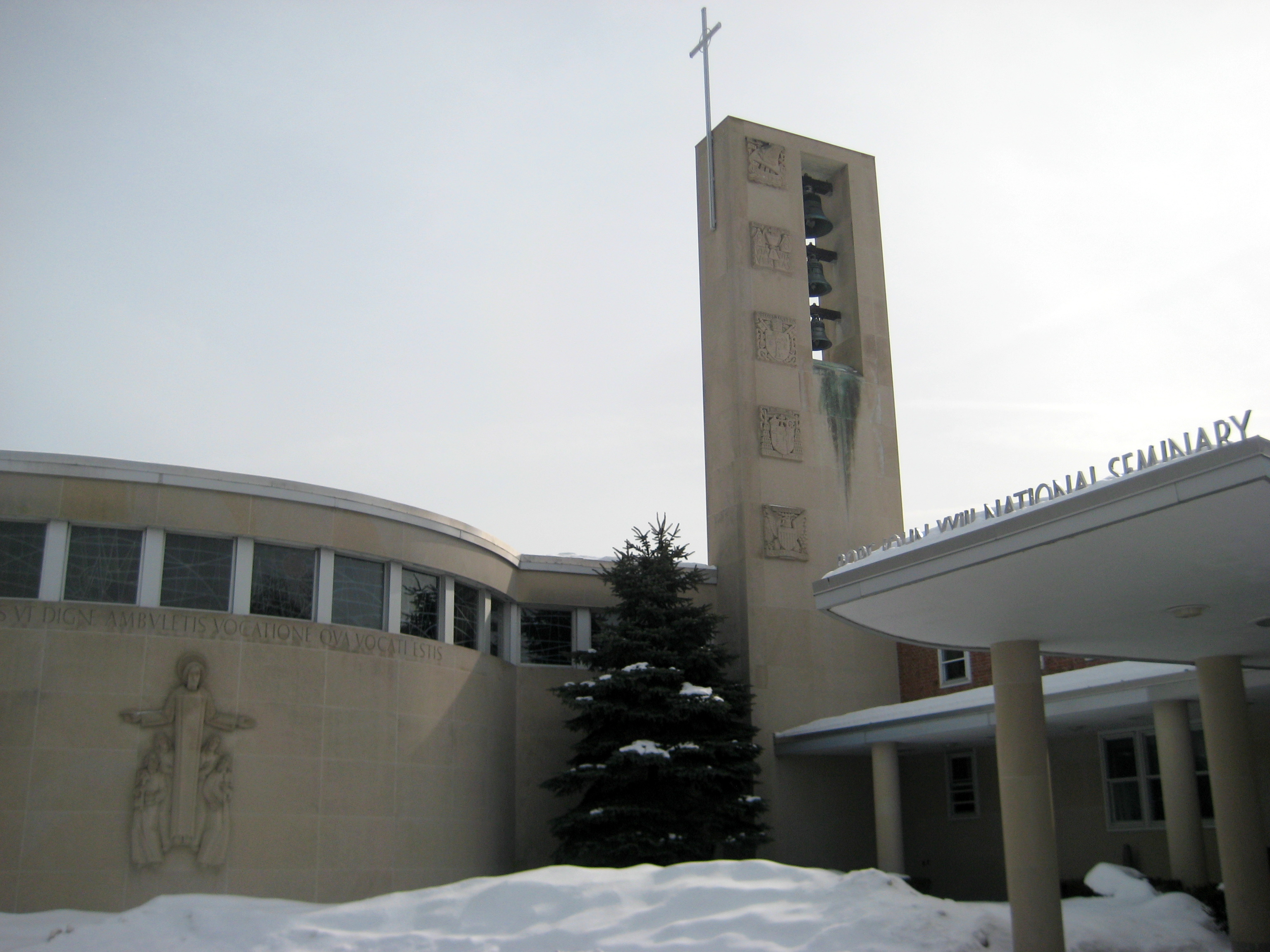
Pope St. John XXIII National Seminary in Weston, Massachusetts

Pope St. John XXIII National Seminary (formerly Blessed John XXIII National Seminary) is a Roman Catholic seminary in Weston, Massachusetts. It offers a graduate-level program designed for priesthood candidates aged 30 and above, often called "second-career vocations" or "delayed vocations".

Founded by Boston Archbishop Richard Cardinal Cushing in 1964, the seminary was chartered by the Commonwealth of Massachusetts in 1972 and became accredited by the Association of Theological Schools in 1983. It awards graduates the M. Div. degree.

== Gallery ==
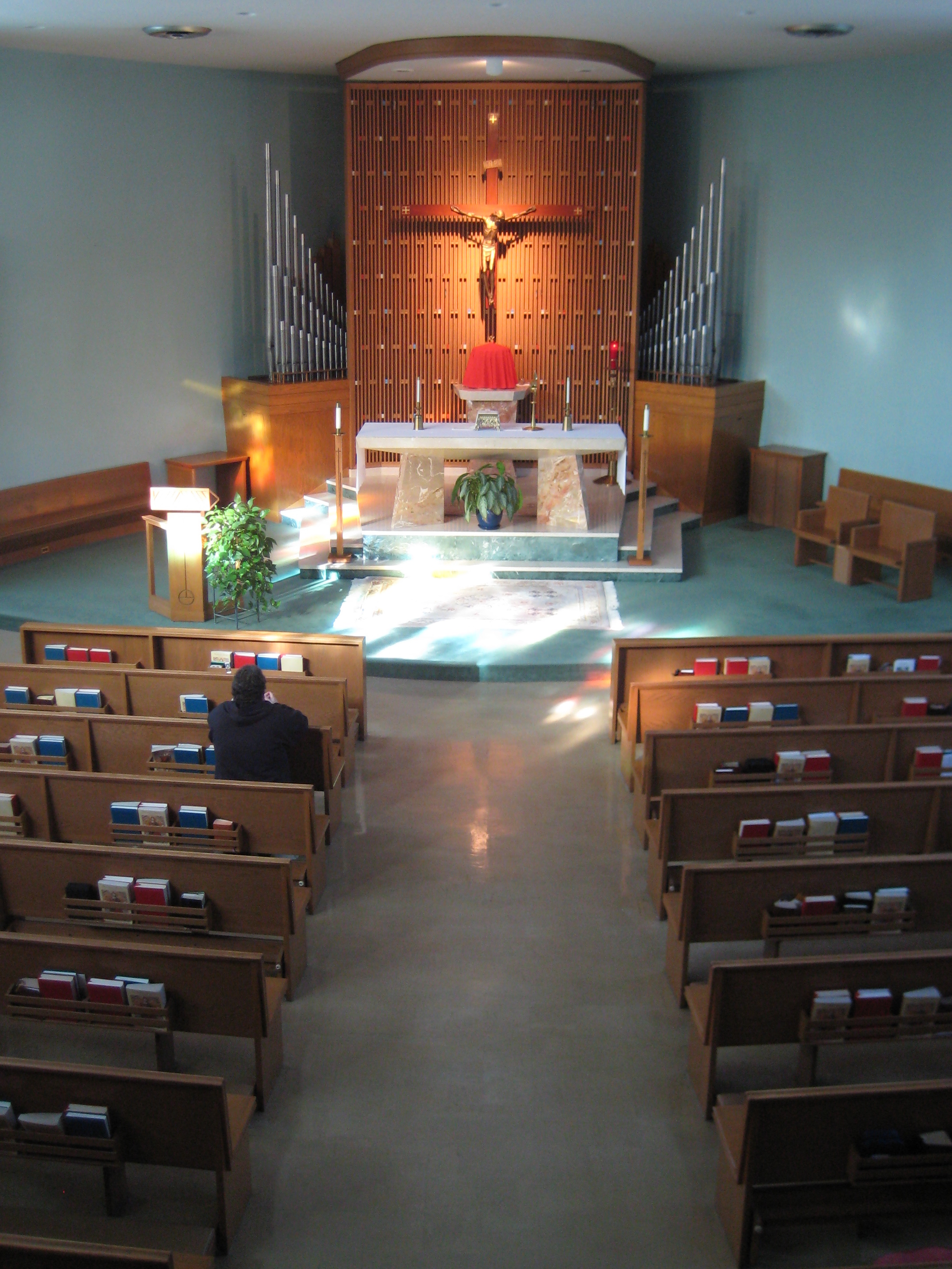
An aspiring seminarian on a vocational discernment retreat in solitary afternoon prayer before the altar in the chapel

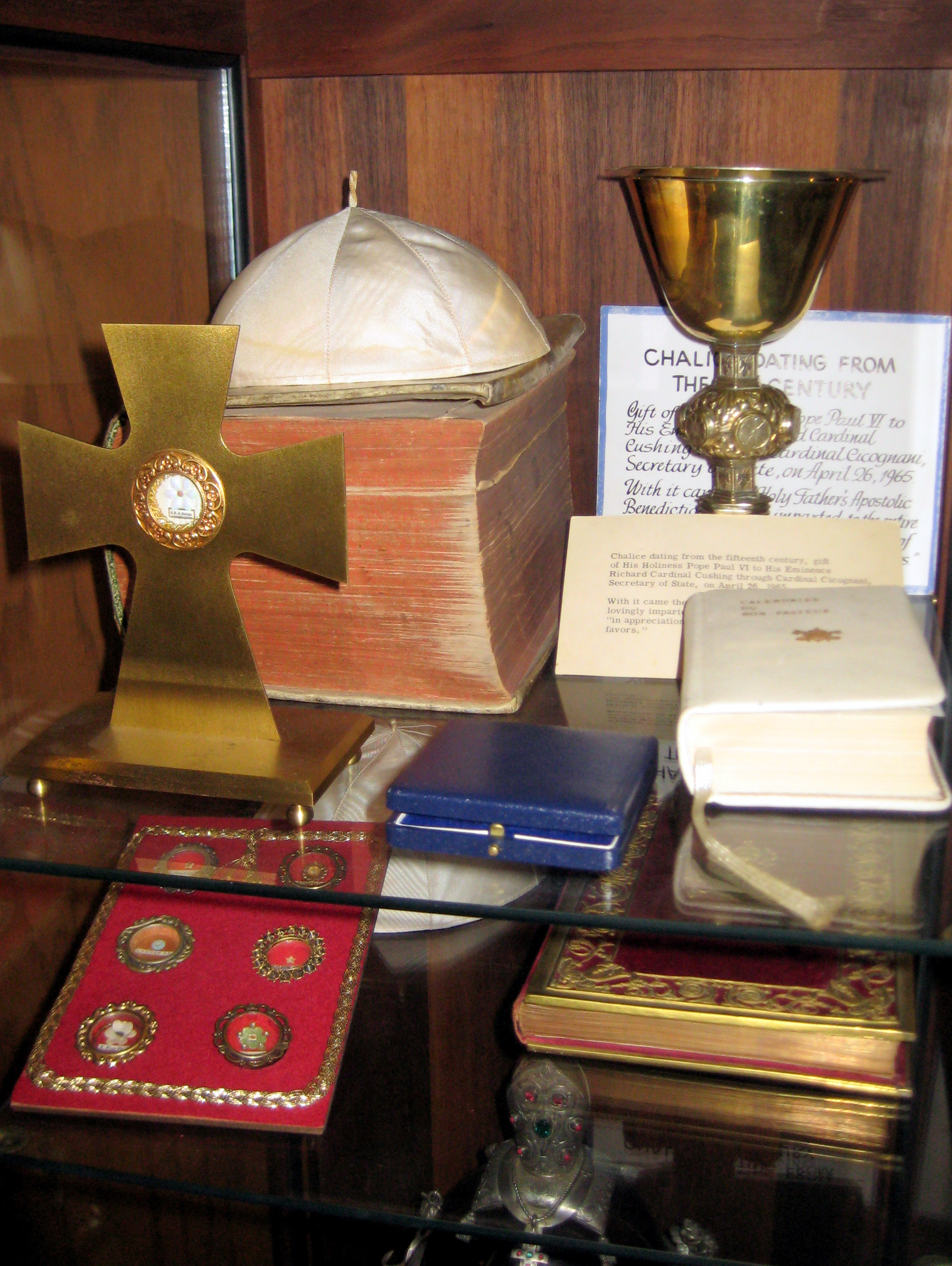
Collection of items in the sacristy including white papal zucchetti, a chalice from the 15th century, rare Roman Missals, and 1st degree relics from various Roman Catholic saints

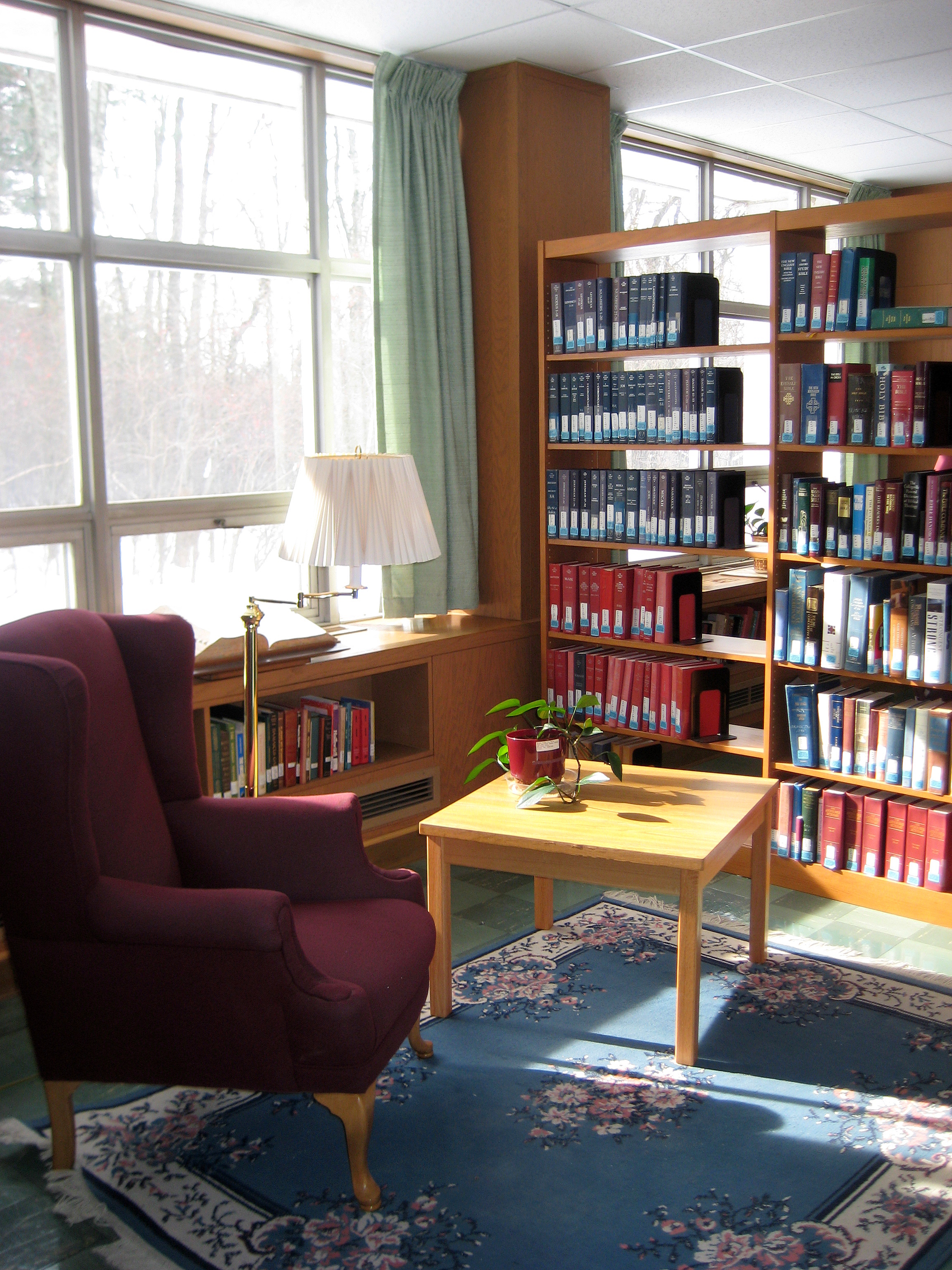
A reading area in the library of Pope St. John XXIII National Seminary

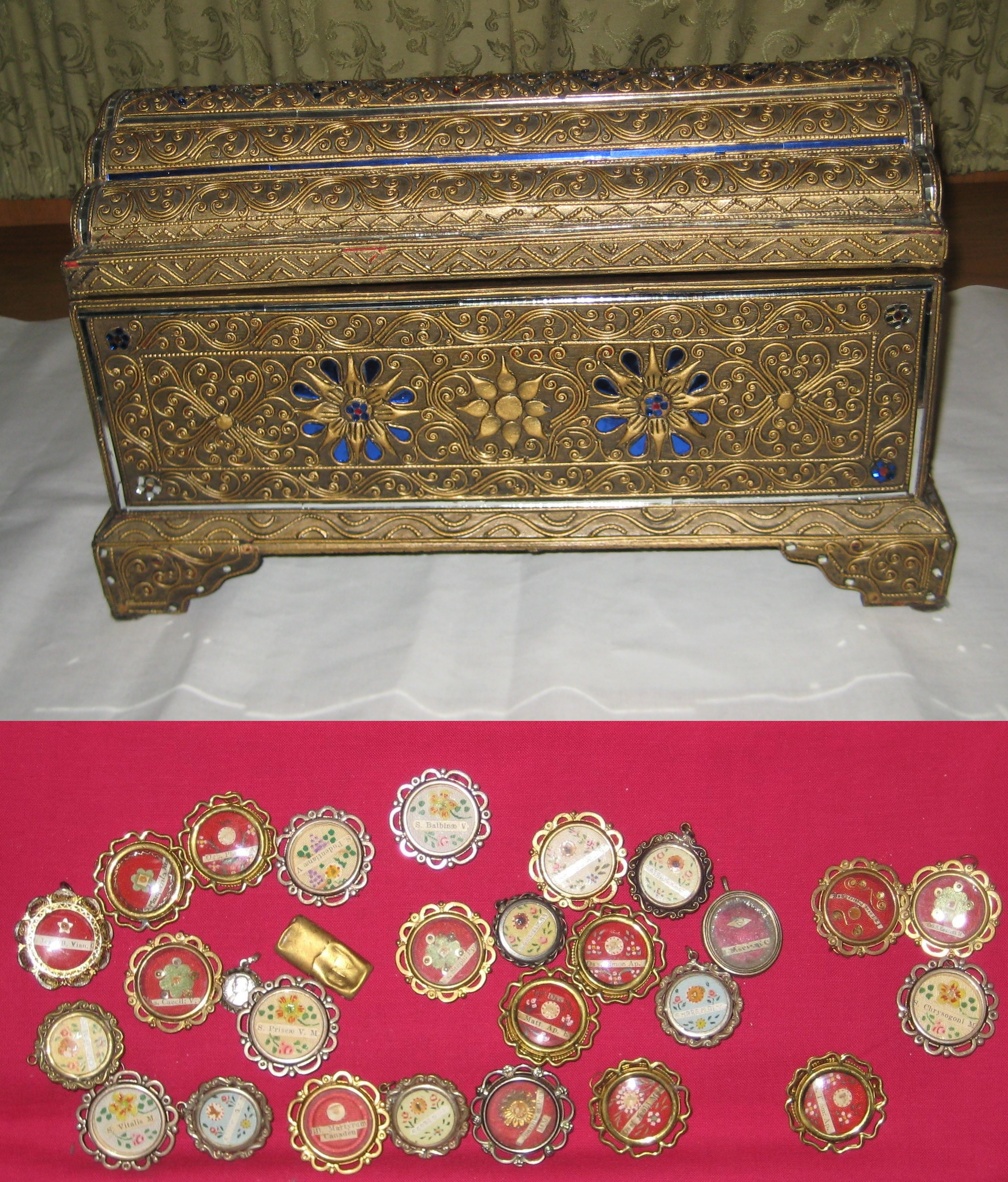
Reliquary with relics from St. James, St. Matthew, St. Philip, St. Simon, St. Thomas, St. Stephen and other saints
