= St. Joseph's Church (Fall River, Massachusetts) =

Historic church in Massachusetts, United States

- U.S. National Register of Historic Places
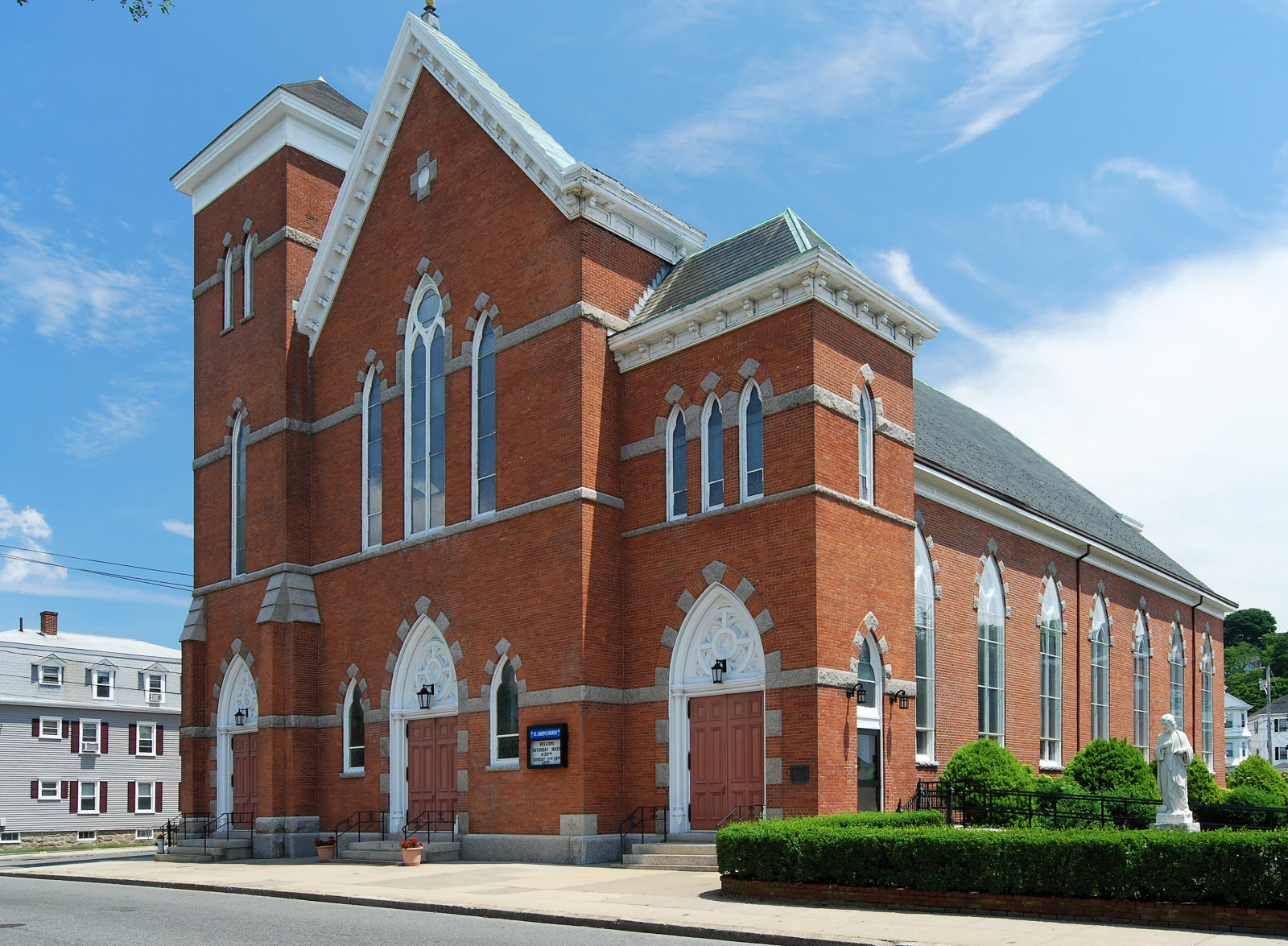

- Location within Massachusetts Location within the United States
- Location: Fall River, Massachusetts
- Coordinates: 41°43′7″N 71°8′52″W
- Built: 1880
- Architect: Patrick C. Keely
- Architectural style: Gothic Revival
- MPS: Fall River MRA
- NRHP reference No.: 83000720
- Added to NRHP: February 16, 1983

St. Joseph's Church is a historic church located at 1355 North Main Street in Fall River, Massachusetts. Designed by notable church architect Patrick C. Keely, it was built in 1880 in the Gothic Revival style. It was added to the National Register of Historic Places in 1983, the same day as St. Patrick's.

== History ==
The parish was founded to accommodate the growing numbers of Catholics who had settled in the northern section of the city in the 1870s to work in the cotton mills, including the Border City, Narragansett, Mechanics, Sagamore Mills. It was split off from St. Mary's in 1873.

=== Rev. William H. Bric ===
The first pastor was Reverend William H. Bric. Bric was born in Tralee, County Kerry, Ireland, in 1841, and made his preparatory studies for the priesthood at Killarney, and then at Cambrai, in southern France, after which he came to this country and was sent by the then Right Reverend Bishop Francis Patrick McFarland to the Seminary of Saint Sulpice at Baltimore, Maryland, where he was ordained to the priesthood. After curacies at Woonsocket, Rhode Island, and at the Providence Cathedral, he was named as pastor for Harrisville and Slatersville, Rhode Island, remaining in charge there for four years. Then it was that he was selected by Right Reverend Bishop Hendricken to form the new Saint Joseph's parish.

He arrived in the early part of April 1873 and made his abode in what was then known as the Leland house, located on North Main street at a point just north of the present President Avenue. The first mass celebrated there for the scattered flock that comprised the congregation, took place on Low Sunday, April 20, 1873. A temporary edifice was gotten under way in short order at a spot close by what is now known as Vestal Street across from the Old North Burial Ground, and here the Catholics of the northern section of the city worshiped for a period of between three and four years. Somerset was a mission of St. Joseph's until 1877.

Father Bric purchased a large tract of land at the corner of North Main and Weetamoe streets. To the rear portion of this lot was then removed the small building that was being used for Mass, and to it were added two wings and a small choir loft. As the congregation grew and the seating capacity became inadequate Bric decided that it was time to erect a new church building. Architect Patrick H. Keeley of Brooklyn, was entrusted with the working out of the details, and on Monday, August 5, 1880, ground was broken on the North Main Street side of the lot. The contract called for an excavation nine feet deep, the work to be finished within four weeks. And so it was done.

Bric, suffered from a heart condition and died on Saturday, August 7 at the age of thirty-nine, one week before the planned ceremony to lay the cornerstone. He'd been pastor for seven years. His funeral on the following Wednesday, August 11, was marked by a Solemn High Mass of Requiem; his body was subsequently placed in a tomb specially constructed in the basement of the church at a point under the altar. There was one of the largest gathering of people of all faiths that the northern section had ever witnessed, for the deceased had a citywide reputation for public service. Apart from his priestly duties and responsibilities, he had served two full terms of three years each as a member of the Fall River School Committee, being regarded far and wide in the community as a man of scholarly attainments and broad-minded views.

The laying of the cornerstone was carried out as per program in the presence of a great number of spectators. Right Reverend Bishop Hendricken, Bishop of Providence first read the prayers for the dead over the grave of the late pastor and then proceeded to the southwest corner of the building, where the exercises proper followed. Several of the church sodalities were grouped about the platform, their banners draped in deepest mourning. The handsome and massive piece of granite, with the numerals 1880 cut into it, marking the date of erection, was swung into place at the appointed moment under the direction of the contractors, Messrs. Hogan & Lord, the Right Reverend Ordinary using in laying the mortar a solid silver trowel that was then awarded to James Hayden of Durfee Street. Within the corner stone was deposited a copper box in which were copies of recent date of the Fall River Herald and News, Boston Herald and Pilot, and other newspapers; as well as coins, a portrait of Reverend Father Bric.

=== Rev. Andrew J. Brady ===
Following the death of Fr. Bric, the then curate, Rev. John H. Gormley, was "locum Tenens" until November 1, 1880, when selection was made of Rev. Andrew J. Brady. Brady, the second pastor of Saint Joseph's, was like his predecessor, a native of Ireland, born in a small village of County Cavan in 1847. Following a common school education, he pursued his collegiate and classical studies in one of the Irish colleges, then coming to this country and continuing his theological course in the Grand Seminary, Montreal, where he was ordained in 1871. His first assignment was to Olneyville, R.I., and, subsequently, he labored in Attleboro. When Reverend Father Matthias McCabe was transferred from Sandwich to the pastorate of the Church of the Sacred Heart in this city, his duties at Sandwich on Cape Cod were taken up by Rev. Father Brady, until drafted to take the place of the late Rev. Bric. He found St. Joseph's church in an incomplete state, but by his own energy and the encouragement of the parishioners the edifice was all but finished during his administration. An event of one year while he was pastor was the celebration of Saint John's day, when all of the French-speaking organizations of the city marched in parade from the center to Saint Joseph's Church and there attended the offering up of Holy Mass, with outdoor festivities following. Brady himself was not of strong health, suffering from rheumatism and Bright's disease. In the fall of 1884 he visited the Arkansas Hot Springs in the hope of gaining rest and relief, but this proved of little avail. He died on Ash Wednesday, February 18, 1885, at the age of thirty-eight. The funeral took place on the following Friday morning and the Solemn High Mass of Requiem marked the holding of the first religious service in the new Saint Joseph's Church. Alongside the body of the first pastor, the mortal remains of the second pastor were laid at rest in a vault in the basement. Two days later, on February 22, 1885, the initial Sunday devotions consisting of Masses and Vespers were held in the church.

=== Rev. Bernard Boyle ===
On Thursday, February 26, 1885 Rev. Bernard Boylan, assistant under Reverend Father Edward J. Mongan at Saint Mary's in North Attleboro, assumed charge at Saint Joseph's. Father Boylan, the third pastor in the half-century existence of Saint Joseph's, was born in Wareham, Mass., on September 25, 1853. He attended the public schools of his native town until he was 11 years of age and then prepared for college at Pierce Academy in Middleboro. In 1868 he entered Saint Charles' College at Ellicott City, near Baltimore, Md., where he completed the regular college courses and graduated with high honors in June 1872. The fall of that year marked his entrance as a student of Philosophy in Saint Laurent's College, near Montreal, he remaining there for a period of two years. Next, he engaged principally in the study of Dogmatic and Moral Theology, the Scriptures and Canon Law at the Grand Seminary in Montreal, the culmination of his efforts being his ordination to the priesthood there by Right Reverend Edward Charles Fabre, Bishop of the Diocese of Montreal, on December 23, 1876.

Having been adopted by the Providence Diocese, Reverend Father Boylan presented his letters to Right Reverend Bishop Hendricken and was selected by the latter as assistant to Reverend Doctor Michael A. Wallace, pastor of Saint Michael's church at South Providence, where he remained for eight months. In those comparatively early days of the Middle Western States there was a great demand for the services of Catholic priests, and Reverend Father Boylan was one of the first to respond to the call. He was stationed by the Right Reverend Bishop John L. Spalding of the Diocese of Peoria as pastor of Saint Paul's Church at Odell, Ill., and there he labored for five years with such marked success for his church and the people that some time subsequently, after he had returned to the East, a new parish was created in his Illinois settlement and in his honor it was named Saint Bernard's, a flattering but most worthy tribute.

Recalled to the Providence Diocese, the first assignment of the young clergyman was to Saint Charles' Church at Woonsocket, R.I., and three months afterwards he was transferred to Saint Mary's Church in North Attleboro. Upon the demise of Reverend Father Brady early in 1885, he was selected as the clergyman in the diocese best fitted to assume the burden of completing the erection of Saint Joseph's Church and arranging for the paying off of the large debt that had been necessarily contracted. In the earlier years of his pastorate he was often forced to carry on the work single-handed, owing to the scarcity of priests, but he never faltered or hesitated in his tasks.

Boylan's first energies were necessarily directed at completing the preparations for the dedication of the church which took place on Memorial Day of 1885, Saturday, May 30. Right Reverend Bishop Hendricken presided over the dedication, and this was followed by a Solemn High Mass. The sermon was by Reverend Father R.J. Barry of Hyde Park, who spoke in English and French from the text: "How goodly are thy tents, O Jacob, and thy tabernacles, O Israel."

Father Boylan reorganized the Sunday School, over which he placed as its first Superintendent William J. McGrath, drawn from the ranks of the Christian Doctrine Society, and who held the position for a number of years. The first mission in the parish history was in October 1886 and lasted two weeks - the first for the English-speaking members conducted by Reverend Fathers McGrath and Fitzpatrick, the second for the French speaking members in charge of Reverend Fathers Bournigable and Lagier, of the Oblate Order from Lowell.

During all these years the parish had been a mixed one, but with the increasing roll of French-Canadians they began to ask for the formation of a church of their own, and so on December 1, 1887, Saint Matthew's was set apart as a new parish with Reverend Father J.A. Payan as pastor.

In the summer of 1889 the old rectory was sold and moved off the premises, which soon housed a new building. The domestic affairs of the household are presided over by the two sisters of the pastor, the Misses Ellen E. and Kathryn A. Boylan.

On Sunday, November 22, 1889, the League of the Sacred Heart was introduced. Reverend Father Noonan, of the Society of Jesus, from Saint Joseph's Church in Providence, spoke at length at the morning masses that day on the advantages and blessings of membership in the league and again at the evening service.

In the fall of the following year, from October 26 to November 9, inclusive, a two weeks' mission was given by Passionist Fathers from Hoboken, N.J., Reverend Fathers Alphonsus and Norbert, the first week for the women and the second for the men.

A two weeks' mission was opened on Sunday, February 11, 1894, and was conducted with most successful spiritual results by Reverend Fathers James and Hyacinthe from the monastery of the Passionist Fathers at Hoboken, N.J. On the closing afternoon the first-named clergyman delivered a special discourse on "The Holy Name," and formed a society of that character, the first board of officers appointed by the pastor consisting of the later Reverend Father William S. Flynn (uncle of His Excellency William S. Flynn, present Governor of the State of Rhode Island), as Chaplain and Spiritual Director; Gilbert P. Cuttle as President; John Hanrahan as Vice-President; William J. McGrath as Secretary, and Michael Maley, Sr., as Treasurer.

On the afternoon of Sunday, June 2, during the Vesper service, the preacher was Reverend Father John A. Hurley, then of Pawtucket, R.I., but long since deceased, and a brother of Daniel Hurley of Stanley street and Mrs. Susan McDonald and Miss Mary Hurley of North Main street, all members of Saint Joseph's parish. The particular object of Reverend Father Hurley's presence at his old home church was to assist at the reorganization of two of the girls' societies - the Infant Jesus and Children of Mary.

Parish picnics were held at the old Ashley's Grove (now the site of Saint Vincent's Orphans' Home), with bazaars and dramatic entertainments and coffee suppers in the parish hall that was subsequently demolished in the course of improving the church grounds. A handsome, new, well-equipped Parochial School was built.

For a long period, Reverend Father Boylan was Treasurer of Saint Vincent's Orphans' Home, being the first to assume this position and retaining it until a permanent resident chaplain for this great local charity was appointed in the person of the Reverend Cornelius S. Kelly. While he was at the head of affairs, he was the director of numerous fairs, bazaars and like social ventures upon whose profit the institution well-nigh depended for the funds to support it and carry on its work. Likewise he was treasurer for several years of Saint Patrick's Cemetery and in the conduct of this was compelled to devote no inconsiderable part of his time to its supervision. He is now and has been for an extended period a member of the Board of Consultors of the Fall River Diocese. For a great many years he and his curates have ministered to the spiritual wants of the Catholic inmates of the City Hospital, as well as to those of the old City Almshouse when it was located within the parish lines, offering the Holy Sacrifice of the Mass on Sundays and holy days and attending to the sick and dying at any hour of the day or night.

One of the leading events in the social life of the parishioners of Saint Joseph's was the annual excursion a big summer event of the north end. It grew from a small party of a few hundred until it became known, in the words of Reverend Father Boylan, as the annual reunion, not alone of his own flock, but of countless former parishioners who had removed to various sections of the city and even to other nearby cities. The first affair of this nature took place on Tuesday, August 20, 1895, on steamer King Philip, to Crescent Park. Arranged at rather short notice, nevertheless the boat was well filled when it headed down the river to the summer resort. The next year, July 28, 1996, the crowd was so large that when Weetamoe Mill wharf was left behind the officials would not stop at the Globe wharf to pick up the delegation that was there awaiting the arrival of the craft.

Year after year thereafter until the earlier days of the Great World War struggle this outing was conducted regularly under the auspices of the Holy Name Society of the parish, and the series was regretfully terminated only when it became impossible to charter a boat of any kind for the purpose. Steamer Warwick, with a capacity of 1800, had been regularly leased for a date in the latter part of each July or the beginning of August when once it was seen that the King Philip could not begin to accommodate the party, and there have been occasions when the full limit was taken on the larger craft and latecomers were left on the wharf. Besides Crescent Park, the destination was often Rocky Point, and after spending several hours at the pleasure spot a sail through Newport Harbor was usually enjoyed on the homeward-bound trip.

Excursions were notable events for many older parishioners. On the day of the excursion, residents traveled to the wharf where a steamer picked up passengers ranging from infants to older adults. Reverend Father Boylan oversaw the departure and was the last to disembark at the end of the trip to ensure the event ran smoothly. In its final years, the event generated over one thousand dollars in profit for the parish before Saint Joseph's parish excursions were discontinued.

Mention may be made briefly of a large Sunday School for boys and girls, an Altar Society for married women, a League of the Sacred Heart, the Children of Mary Sodality, the Holy Name Society, and the Holy Angels' Sodality and the Sacred Heart Society for boys. It was Father Boylan's custom to arrange for special sermons during the Lenten periods of each year, with Missionary Fathers as the speakers, including the Dominican Fathers from Providence College.

Curates who have served at St. Joseph's include: 1874, Reverend Father Daniel A. Ryan; 1874, Reverend Father Edward E. Norbert; 1878, Reverend Father Thomas F. Briscoe; 1878-1881; Reverend Father John H. Gormley; 1881-1882, Reverend Father James F. Roach; 1883, Reverend Father James J. Brady, now pastor of Saint Killian's Church in New Bedford; 1883-1885, Reverend Father Michael P. Cassidy; 1885, Reverend Father Thomas P. Elliott; 1885, Reverend Father Daniel J. Coughlin; 1886-1887, Reverend Father William S. Flynn; 1888-1889, Reverend Father Daniel Driscoll, 1890-1896, Reverend Father William S. Flynn; 1896-1910, Reverend Father Thomas A. Kelly, now pastor of Saints Peter and Paul's Church in this city; 1910-1912, Reverend Father John F. McDonnell, now curate at the Church of the Sacred Heart in Springfield; 1912-1913, Reverend Father Timothy J. Duff; 1914-1921, Reverend Father John E. Morris, now attached to the Catholic Foreign Mission Seminary at Maryknoll, N.Y. The present young and energetic assistants of Reverend Father Boylan are Reverend Father Thomas P. Doherty, who with the exception of a few weeks has spent his entire priestly life here, and Reverend Father Thomas J. McLean, who came among us in 1921.

The Parochial School, a solid brick structure of two floors and eight rooms, with all the accessories, a large yard for play purposes in good weather and a clean and well-kept basement for use in adverse weather is located on the North High street side of the church property. At the beginning of the school year in September 1907, it was opened for business with Reverend father Thomas A. kelly in charge, he remaining at the helm until may of 1910; then followed Reverend Father John F. McDonnell until June 1912, Reverend Father Timothy J. Duff for one year and Reverend Father Thomas P. Doherty in June 1913.

At the head of the teaching faculty was Sister Mary Paula from the opening session until December 1908, Sister Mary Magdalen from January 1909 to June 1911, Sister Mary Ephrem from September 1911 to December 1913, Sister Mary Felix from December 1913 to June 1914, Sister Mary Catherine from September 1914 to June 1917, Sister Mary Assumpta from September 1917 to June 1919 and Sister Mary Augustine from September 1919 to the present day. The first graduating class numbered two, the second increased to three, there were 26 in 1922 and to date a total of 165 graduates. John Chippendale of Harvard street, to be ordained to the priesthood in May of this year, will have the signal honor of being the only graduate of the school so far to have conferred upon him the sacrament of Holy Orders.

A number of boys from Saint Joseph's have received the sacrament of Holy Orders. They are: Reverend Father Edward A. Higney, pastor of Saint Joseph's, Newport, R.I.; Reverend Father John A. Hurley (the only one deceased and at the time pastor of Saint Mary's, North Attleboro); Reverend Father David F. Sheedy, pastor of Saint John's, Attleboro; Reverend Father Peter J. Malone, pastor of the Holy Name, Providence; Reverend Father William K. Dwyer, pastor of Our Lady of Sorrows, Corona, L.I.; Reverend Father Daniel A. Dwyer, assistant to his brother at Corona; Reverend Father James R.J. Burns, curate at the Holy Name, New Bedford; Reverend Father Robert V. Dwyer, curate at Saints Peter and Paul's, New York City; Reverend Doctor Patrick A. Collis, professor of Latin at Saint Charles' Seminary, Overbrook, Pa.; Reverend Father John J. Shay, curate at Saint Mary's, Taunton; Reverend Father John Kelly, curate at Saint Mary's Cathedral, Fall River; Reverend Father Edward L. O'Brien, curate at Saint John's, Attleboro. In addition, Reverend Father Cornelius J. Holland, pastor of Saint Charles' Church, Woonsocket, was a resident of the parish at the time of his ordination.

The trustees of the church are Henry J. Whalen and James H. O'Neil.

The current Pastor is Rev. John Raposo.

== Architecture ==
The church is a large structure of brick with stone trimmings, 170 feet in length, 78 feet wide and surmounted by two golden crosses. The walls are 30 feet high, while from the loftiest point of the roof to the floor the distance is 73 feet. There is a seating capacity of about a thousand. Built without galleries, it is well lighted by several large stained glass windows on the north and south sides, and its cheerfulness is one of the things for which the church is noted. The pictures on the windows are emblematic of episodes in the life of Jesus. Among the donors of the original set of windows were Mr. and Mrs. James Hayden, Cornelius L. Kelly and Family, Mrs. David Sheedy and Family, Mr. and Mrs. John Collins, In Memory of Reverend Father Bric, In Memory of Reverend Father Brady and a number of the church societies.

The three broad entrances from North Main street open into large vestibules from which swinging doors lead into the body of the church. In the south and north vestibules stairs ascend to the choir gallery, which extends across the entire western portion of the edifice and to a depth of 30 feet. The nave is divided by three broad aisles. The flooring is of hard pine and the pews are of ash with black walnut trimmings. An even dozen iron pillars, six on each side, are enclosed in wood, presenting the appearance of clustered columns and upholding the hardwood groins that support the roof.

The ceiling and sides are frescoed in panels. Running almost the entire width of the church, the sanctuary has a smaller altar at either side, dedicated to Saint Joseph, the patron saint, and to the Blessed Virgin Mary. These, like the main altar, are painted in white and gold. A carpet on the floor of the sanctuary, green in color with red trimmings, adds the last detail to the beauteous ensemble.

The sanctuary is separated from the nave by a highly polished, elaborately carved oak railing, in front of which communicants kneel upon a raised step, and it matches superbly a most substantially built pulpit of oak with heavy brass trimmings. In the windows above the side altars are striking colored representations of the Glorification of Saint Joseph and of the Coronation of the Blessed Virgin Mary. On the wall back of the main altar and rising high above it is a large fresco of Christ's Crucifixion and Mary clinging to the cross; on the south wall a painting of the Resurrection and on the north wall one of the Annunciation.

The windows were replaced in 1921 by new ones, the donors of which were: Sanctuary, Sacrifice of Abraham, Gift of Mr. and Mrs. James H. Mahoney; Sacrifice of Melchisedech, In Memory of John J. and Mary Shay; Glorification of Saint Joseph, Gift of Altar Society; Coronation of the Blessed Virgin, Gift of Children of Mary Sodality. Vestry - Gift of Rev. Thomas J. McLean, in Memory of Evelyn Walsh; In Memory of Frank Sullivan. Vestibule - In Memory of Thomas Hudner; In Memory of Frank C. Sullivan; Confessionals - In Memory of Joseph H. Sullivan; In Memory of John R. Sullivan. Gallery - In Memory of Helen Powers; In Memory of Thomas O'Neil; In Memory of Parents of Mr. & Mrs. Owen Luddy; Gift of Mr. & Mrs. John R. Sullivan. Choir, in Rear of Organ - In Memory of Parents of Mr. & Mrs. James A. Burke; In Memory of Jeremiah and Annie Murphy; In Memory of Living and Dead members of the Holy Name Society. Nave - In Memory of Bernard and Bridget Mullaney; In Memory of Rev. Andrew J. Brady; In Memory of Mary L. Brady (by the Family); In Memory of Evelyn and Angela Whalen; In Memory of Richard and Mary Rigby (by the Family); In Memory of William and Jane Roscoe; In Memory of Mary O'Brien (by Michael O'Brien); In Memory of Catherine Higney (by the Family); In Memory of James and Mary Sullivan; In Memory of James and Kathryn Kerrigan (by the Family); In Memory of Sarah Sullivan; In Memory of Rev. William H. Bric; In Memory of James Sullivan.

On the walls between the windows, on the north and south sides, there were installed new stations of the cross of a most impressive character, the donors being, in the numerical order of their appearance: Reverend Father Bernard Boylan, Mr. and Mrs. John J. Shay, Mrs. and Miss Hannah Bric, Mrs. Mary Dwyer, Mrs. Mary Rigby, Mr. and Mrs. Michael Waldron, Mr. and Mrs. M.H. Sullivan, John Lewis, Mr. and Mrs. Daniel Riley, Mr. and Mrs. Leonard Walmsley, Hanora Crowther, Mr. and Mrs. Thomas O'Donnell, William Ashton, Mr. and Mrs.Luke Boylan.

The church's pipe organ was built in 1883 by W.K. Adams & Sons in Providence, Rhode Island. It is one of the largest built by them. It was once run by water and then by bellows.

== See also ==
- National Register of Historic Places listings in Fall River, Massachusetts nuns who taught there in 1960s.
