= Nativity of Our Lord Catholic Church, Chicago =

Church building in Chicago, IL

Coordinates: 41.827°N 87.643°W

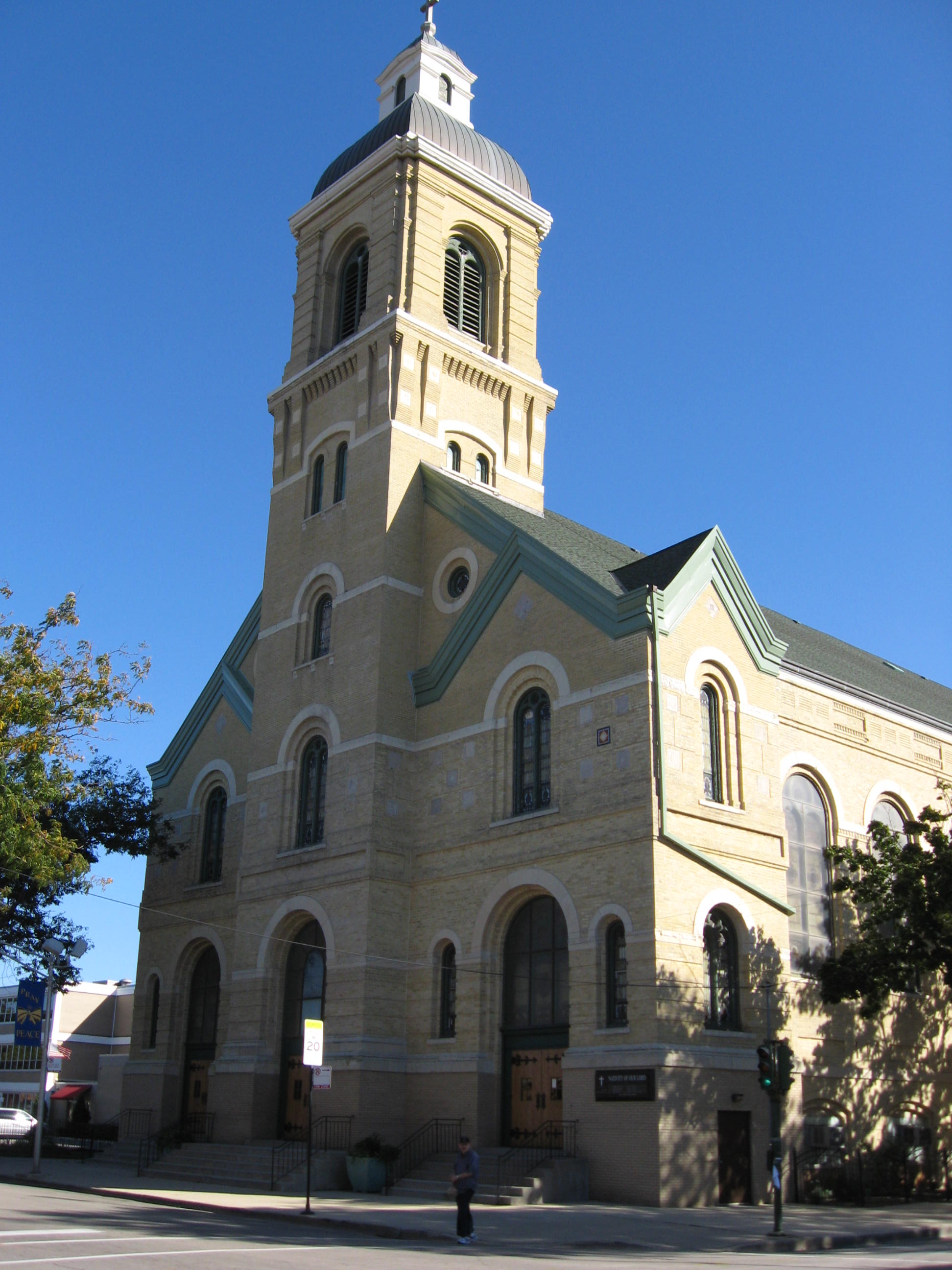
Nativity of Our Lord Church

Nativity of Our Lord Catholic Church is one of the oldest churches in Chicago, Illinois, founded in 1868. The church was designed by noted architect Patrick Keely, an architectural designer prominent throughout the 19th century. He also designed the Holy Name Cathedral in downtown Chicago.

Nativity of Our Lord Parish is part of the Roman Catholic Archdiocese of Chicago and is located in the city's Bridgeport neighborhood. Prominent church members include former Chicago Mayors Richard J. Daley and Richard M. Daley, as well as William M. Daley, former U.S. Secretary of Commerce and Chief of Staff for the Obama administration, and former State Senator and Representative and current Cook County Commissioner John P. Daley.

== Historical background ==
Nativity of Our Lord Parish was founded in 1868, to serve Irish Catholics who lived near the Union Stockyards. Bishop Thomas Foley appointed Rev. Michael Lyons to organize the new parish. Father Lyons purchased the J. McPherson Livery Stables at the northeast corner of Halsted and Egan (39th Street), which was at that time the southern border of the City of Chicago. The new parish was appropriately named "Nativity Church," since Christ was also born in a stable. It was dedicated on Palm Sunday, April 5, 1868. The parish grew and Rev. Jeremiah S. O'Neill was named to succeed Father Lyons. With the support of the parish, he acquired 15 lots at the corner of 37th and Dashiel (now Union Avenue) to construct the present church.

In 1874, Reverend Joseph M. Cartan was named pastor and quickly set about the work of building a greater parish and improving the lives of those who lived in Bridgeport. Father Cartan laid the cornerstone for the current church in 1876. Construction continued at a slow and steady pace. It was not until almost three years later that the lower church hall was finished sufficiently to hold services. On December 5, 1885, over nine years after the cornerstone was laid, Archbishop Patrick Feehan dedicated the Nativity of Our Lord Church. It was not until the following summer that decorating and final construction details were completed. The cost of the church was reported at $70,000.

== Architecture ==
The church was designed by Patrick Keely, who was a prolific designer contributing to over 600 churches in the United States. Other notable works by Keely include Holy Name Cathedral in Chicago, The Basilica of the Sacred Heart at Notre Dame University and the Cathedral of the Holy Cross in Boston.

== Stained glass ==
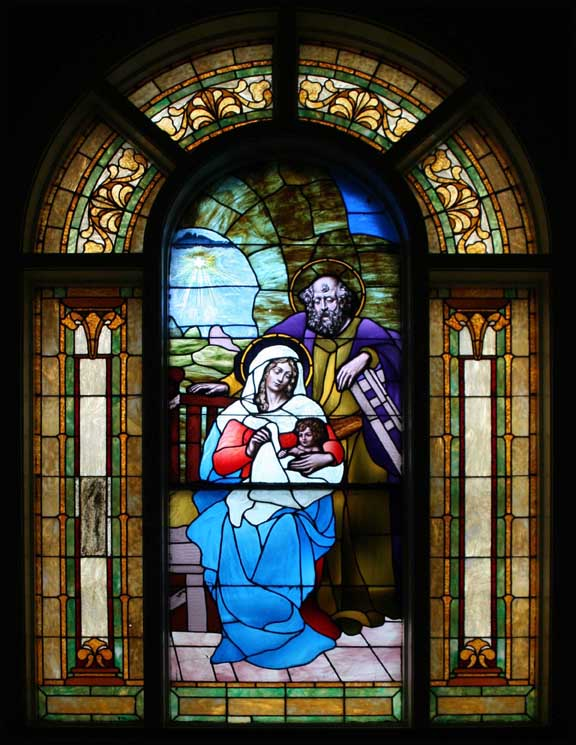
Nativity Chicago Main Entrance Stained Glass

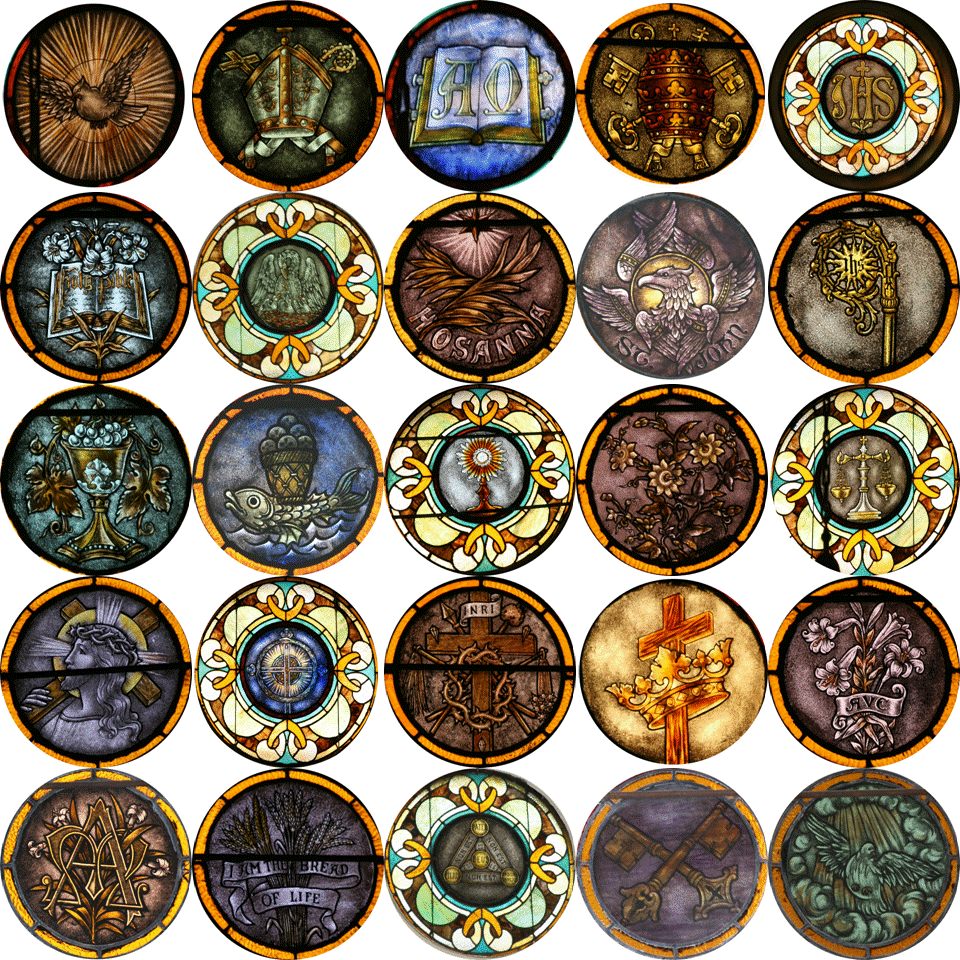
Stained glass insets

Integral to the beauty and warmth of Nativity is the warm, muted light that bathes the interior of the church. Over 185 stained glass windows provide beauty and illumination. Every façade contains stained glass. The fact that the church is intimate and inviting in spite of its considerable mass is due in large part to the warmth these windows bring.

Church records indicate that the current windows were installed in 1907 under the direction of then pastor Rev. James J. Flaherty. The windows can be divided into three primary sets: the nave windows lining the east and west walls of the church, the three windows above the narthex and the windows above the three front entrances. There are dozens of additional windows in the sacristy, the bell tower, and throughout the church. The windows are constructed with gothic patterns that show art nouveau influences. Most major panels have a unique round inset that features a classic, Munich-style stained glass with a religious symbol.

Through the generosity of many parishioners, these 168 heavenly and historic windows were restored to their original grandeur in 2010–2011, as the final phase of a five-year parish improvement process.

== Pastors ==
- Rev. Michael Lyons 1868–1871
- Rev. Jeremiah S. O’Neill 1871–1884
- Rev. Joseph M Cartan 1884–1907
- Rev. James J Flaherty 1907–1922
- Rev. Patrick C Conway 1922–1943
- Rev. Philip Hayes 1943–1949
- Rev. William I Murray 1949–1955
- Rev. Walter Lanus 1956–1960
- Rev. Michael J Conway 1960–1973
- Rev. John J Lydon 1973–1978
- Rev. Edward P O’Brien 1978–1990
- Rev. James P Kehoe 1990–2005
- Rev. Daniel J Brandt 2005–2011
- Rev. Joseph Altman 2011–present
