= St. Joseph's Catholic Church (Lewiston, Maine) =

Historic church in Maine, United States

- U.S. National Register of Historic Places
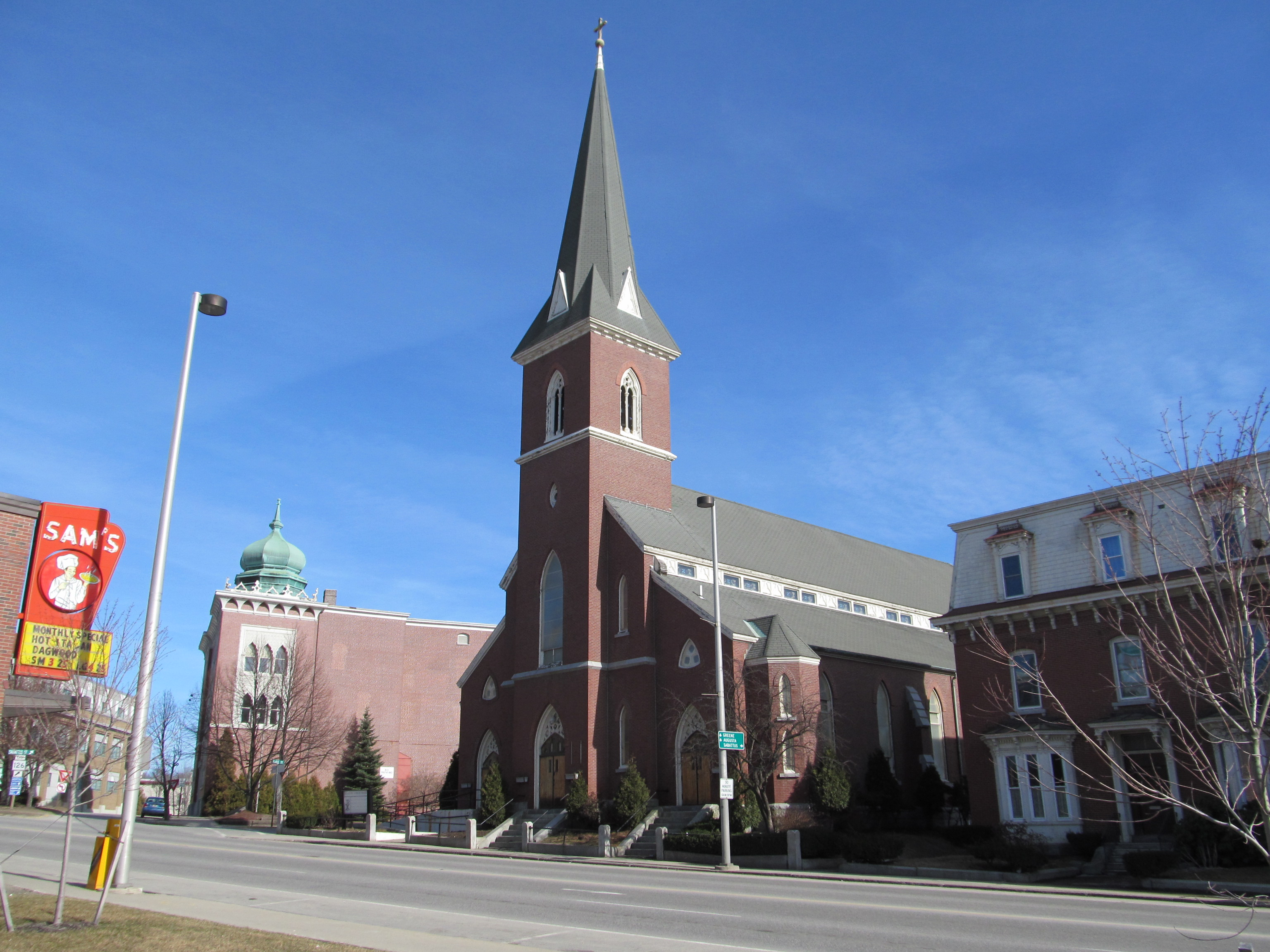
- St. Joseph's Catholic Church

- Location within Maine Location within the United States
- Location: 257 Main St., Lewiston, Maine
- Coordinates: 44°6′0″N 70°12′58″W
- Built: 1865
- Architect: Patrick C. Keely
- Architectural style: Gothic
- NRHP reference No.: 89000845
- Added to NRHP: July 13, 1989

St. Joseph's Catholic Church is a historic former church building at 257 Main Street in Lewiston, Maine. Built 1864–67, it was the first Roman Catholic church in the city, and is one of only two surviving buildings in the state designed by Patrick C. Keely. It was listed on the National Register of Historic Places in 1989. The church closed in 2009, and was in 2013 threatened with demolition. Alternative uses for the structure are still being sought. As of June 2026, construction fence surrounded the building, but it is unclear as whether demolition or renovation is taking place.

== Description and history ==
The former St. Joseph's Church stands on the northeastern fringe of Lewiston's downtown area, at the eastern corner of Main Street (Maine State Route 100) and Blake Street. It is a brick building with Gothic Revival style, and a projecting central tower. The main roof is gabled, with a level of clerestory windows. The tower has one of the three main entrances on the ground floor, a Gothic lancet-arch window on the second, and a belfry with lancet-arched openings on the third level. It is topped by an octagonal spire with cross finial.

Roman Catholic services began in Lewiston in the late 1840s, provided by traveling priests. St. Joseph's was organized 1857, with services held in a former Baptist church. This church was constructed in 1864–67, and was the third church commissioned by the Diocese of Portland from Patrick C. Keely. Keely went on to design several more, as well as the bishop's residence in Portland, but of the churches, only this one and the Cathedral of the Immaculate Conception in Portland survive.

The church served the diocese until it was closed in 2009; its stained glass windows and frescoes were then removed from the building. It was purchased in 2013 by Central Maine Healthcare (CMHC), which announced plans to raze the church and the adjacent rectory. Demolition of the church was delayed to allow alternative uses for the building to be identified, but the rectory was demolished in April 2015. CMHC placed the property back on the market in August 2017.

== See also ==
- National Register of Historic Places listings in Androscoggin County, Maine
