= Patrick Keely =

Irish-American architect

- Born: Patrick Charles Keely; August 9, 1816; Thurles, County Tipperary, Ireland
- Died: August 11, 1896 (aged 80)
- Spouse: Sarah Farmer
- Children: 17

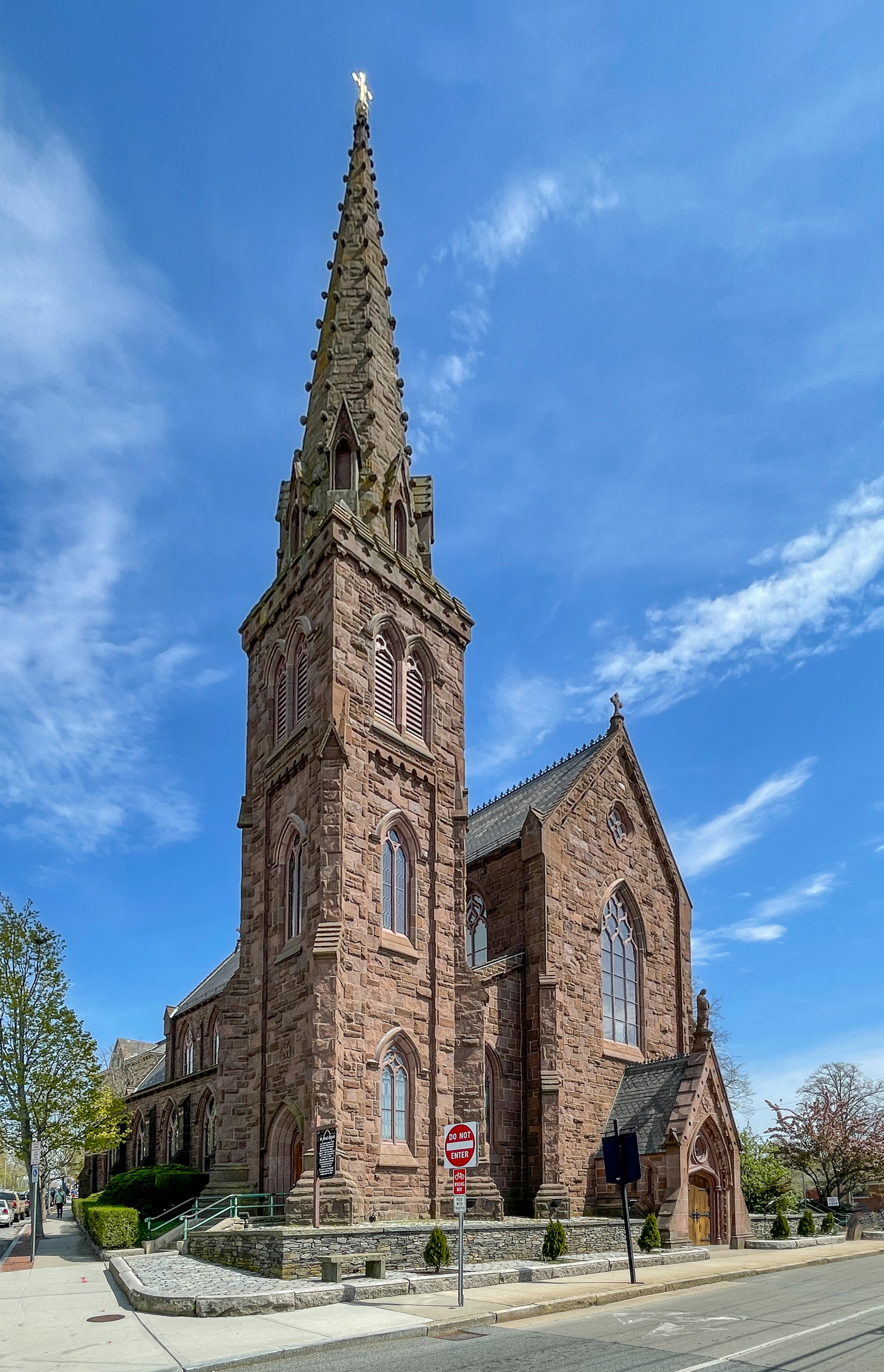
St. Mary's Church Complex in Newport, Rhode Island (1848), the oldest Catholic Church building in the state

Patrick Charles Keely (August 9, 1816 — August 11, 1896) was an Irish-American architect based in Brooklyn, New York, and Providence, Rhode Island. He designed nearly 600 churches and hundreds of other buildings for the Catholic Church or Catholic patrons in the United States and Canada, particularly in New York City, Boston and Chicago in the later half of the 19th century. He designed every 19th-century Catholic cathedral in New England. Several other church and institutional architects began their careers in his firm.

== Early life in Ireland ==
Keely was born in Thurles, County Tipperary, then a part of the United Kingdom of Great Britain and Ireland on August 9, 1816, to a family in comfortable circumstances. His draftsman and builder father introduced him to architecture and training in construction; having come from Kilkenny to work on the building of St. Patrick's College, Thurles and Patrick was educated there, though nothing is recorded of his architectural design education.

== Life in Brooklyn, New York ==
Keely emigrated to the United States, landing at Castle Garden in Manhattan in 1842, and settling in Brooklyn. He arrived at a time when Catholicism in the United States was expanding from its initial footholds in Baltimore, New York City and Boston. Initially, he worked as a carpenter and builder since there were few trained architects practicing and most structures were erected with the design assistance of the client and builder alone. Common practice held that the builder, whether trained as mason or carpenter, crafted his own plans, and details were often executed without even the aid of drawings. For a number of years Keely worked at his trade without attracting attention. During this time, he met the Rev. Sylvester Malone, a Roman Catholic priest his own age.

In 1844 Malone was appointed pastor of St. Mary's Church in Williamsburg, Brooklyn, and set about building a new church. As Know nothing sentiment was strong in the area, Malone let it out that the land he had purchased was for a cemetery. When the people in the area decided that they would rather have a church than a graveyard, opposition subsided. Together with Keely, he worked out a plan for a Gothic church possessing pointed arches, pinnacles, and a few buttresses. Working as a carpenter, Keely produced designs from which the new church was built in 1846. Malone renamed it the Church of Ss. Peter and Paul to avoid confusion with another St. Mary's in Manhattan. The stained glass was by the Morgan Brothers, thus establishing a business relationship with Keely that carried through a number of projects. The church was demolished in 1957, when a new Ss. Peter and Paul was built.

In 1846, Keely married Sarah Farmer; they had seventeen children, ten of whom lived to adulthood. Two of his sons worked in his office, another became a successful musician, the fourth, a physician. Sarah Keely died in 1876.

== Architectural career ==
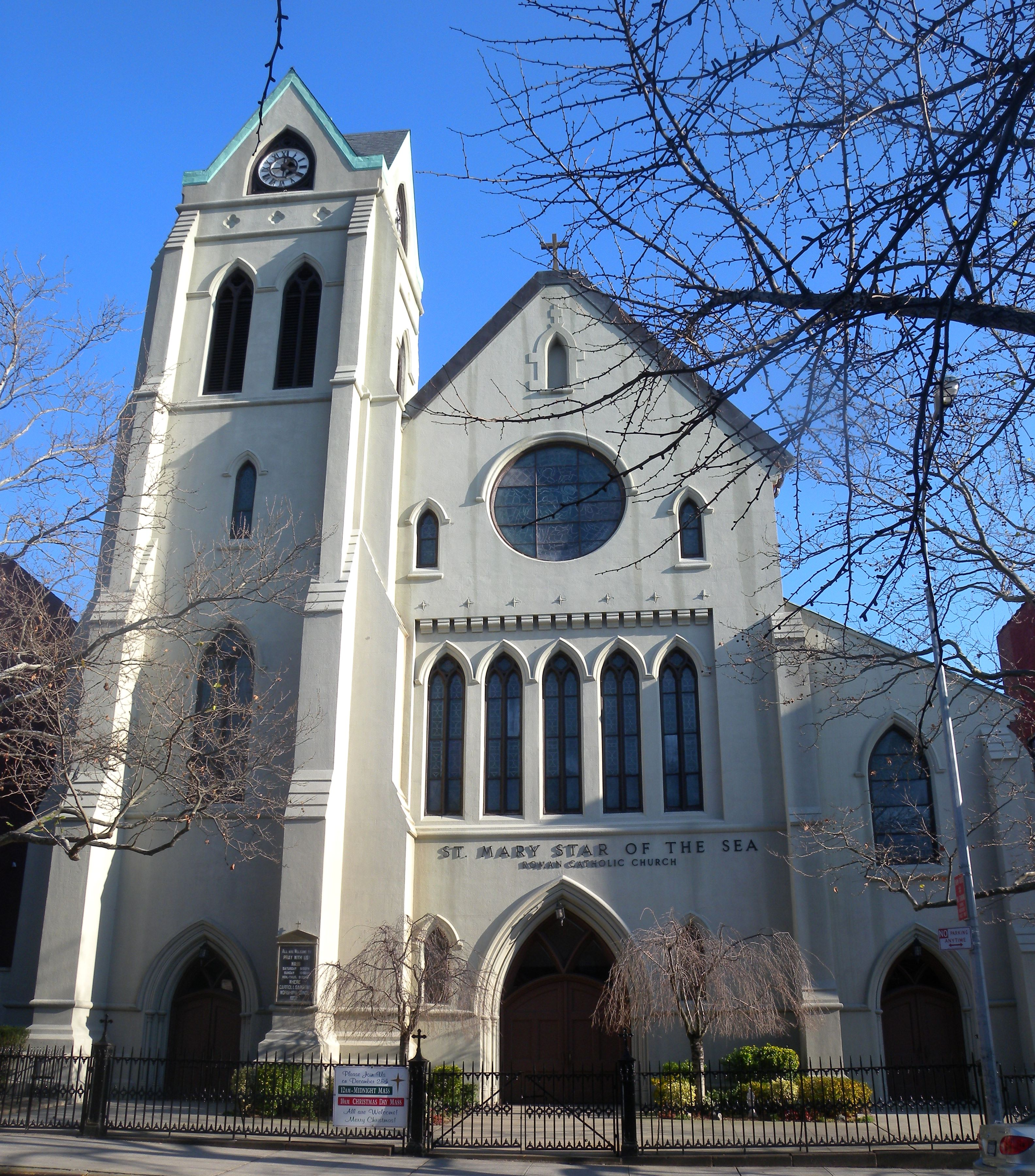
Mary Star of Sea RCC 467 Court St., 1853

The Church of Sts. Peter and Paul was considered an epoch in Catholic building in America. The much-praised work established him as a competent architect and builder at a time when a number of new Roman Catholic churches were being planned "but a relative scarcity of competent architects of the Roman Catholic faith, and Keely's reputation for honesty and integrity quickly made him a popular choice among the hierarchy and clergy throughout the eastern United States."

Thereafter, Keely effectively became the in-house architect for the Roman Catholic archdioceses and was approached from all sides with requests for designs of churches and other necessary structures for an expanding religious life. Art historian William Pierson Jr. said of Keely that "... he developed a practice which ultimately became a virtual monopoly in Catholic Church building for more than a quarter of a century."

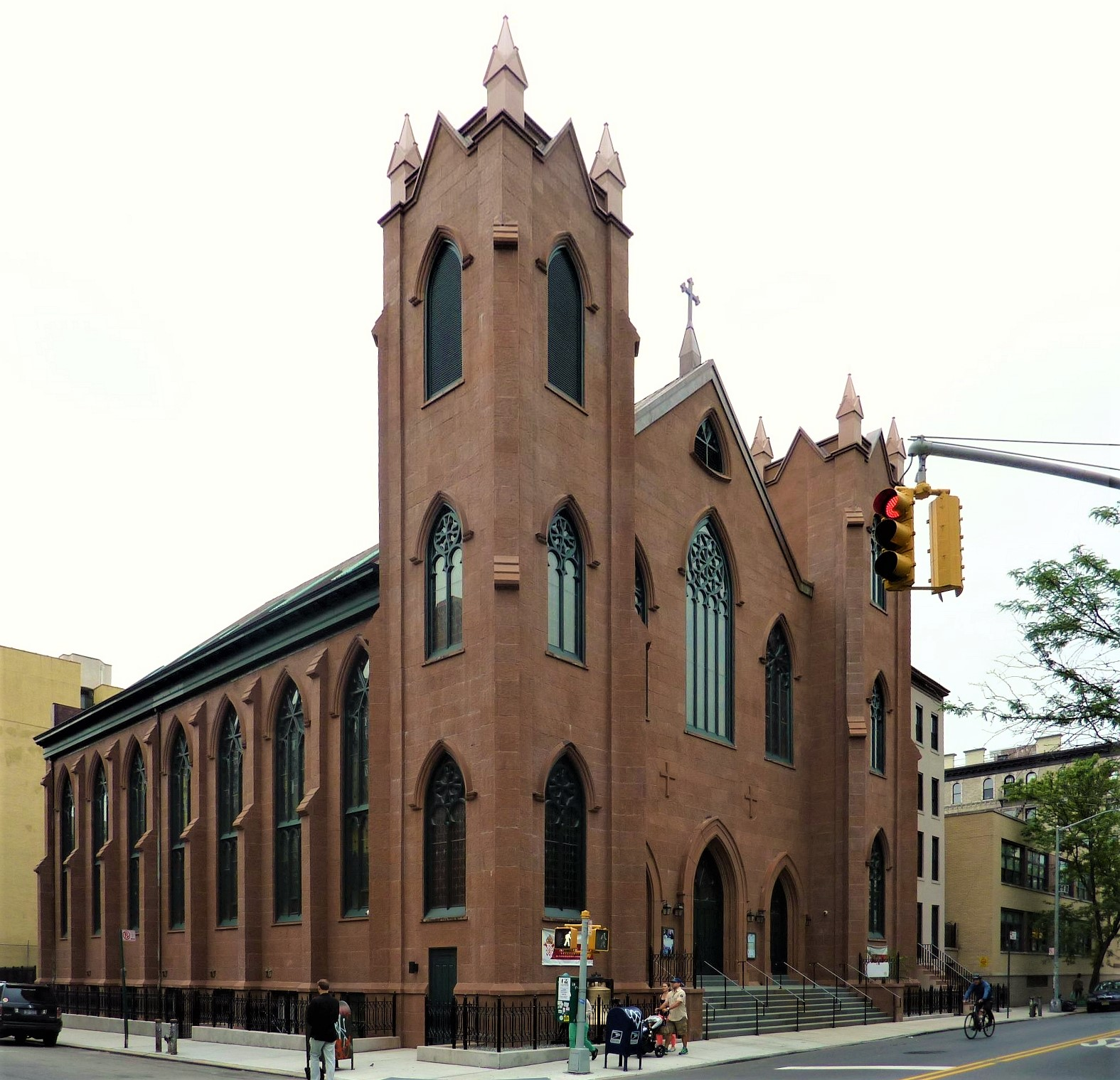
St Brigid's Roman Catholic Church (Manhattan) 1848

In Brooklyn alone there was a great wave of Catholic settlers for whom churches were urgently needed and Keely was the only one thought of to do the work. He continued as a carpenter / craftsman in conjunction with his designing duties. The neo-gothic St. Mary Star of the Sea in Carrol Gardens was built in 1853 with one center aisle and two side aisles. Keely was assisted by carpenter Thomas Houghton. The cornerstone of St. Mary's on Kent Avenue was set in November 1854. The red brick church was dedicated by Bishop John Loughlin and its name changed to St. Patrick's. The building is noted for its roof dormers that illuminate windows in the wall of the nave.

St. Brigid's on E 8th St. in Manhattan was built in 1848 to a Carpenter Gothic design by Keely, who carved the five-pinnacle reredos, organ case, and wooden altar himself.

Keely designed St. Mary's in Yonkers in 1848. When it was dedicated in November 1851, the name was changed to the Church of the Immaculate Conception, although still popularly called St. Mary's. When the new church, designed by Lawrence J. O'Connor, opened in 1892, Keely's building became the Parish Hall.

Keely designed the Jesuit Church of the Immaculate Conception in the South End of Boston in the style of Italian Renaissance Revival in 1858, as well as its walnut case holding the organ pipe work. It was built of white New Hampshire granite. For many years it served as the church for Boston College. Immaculate Conception closed in 2007 and was later sold to developers who planned to convert it to apartments. In 2018, in response from objections raised by area residents, the South End Landmarks Commission denied the developer's request to remove the traceries from the side windows of the Church.

Keely also designed the Jesuits Church of the Gesù (Montreal), the college chapel for the Collège Sainte-Marie de Montréal. Built in 1864, it was completed the following year. Influenced by the Church of the Gesù in Rome, it is the only entirely baroque-style church in Montreal.

Constructed between 1873 and 1875, St. Bernard's Church on W 14th St. was designed in Ruskinian Gothic style. Its "twin towers, triple-portal entrance, and rose window inset into a pointed arch reveal a masterful blending of French and English influences." The church has at least one Tiffany window. It was the first church dedicated by an American Cardinal, Archbishop of New York John McCloskey. In 2003, St. Bernard's merged with Our Lady of Guadalupe to form the new parish of Our Lady of Guadalupe at St. Bernard Church.

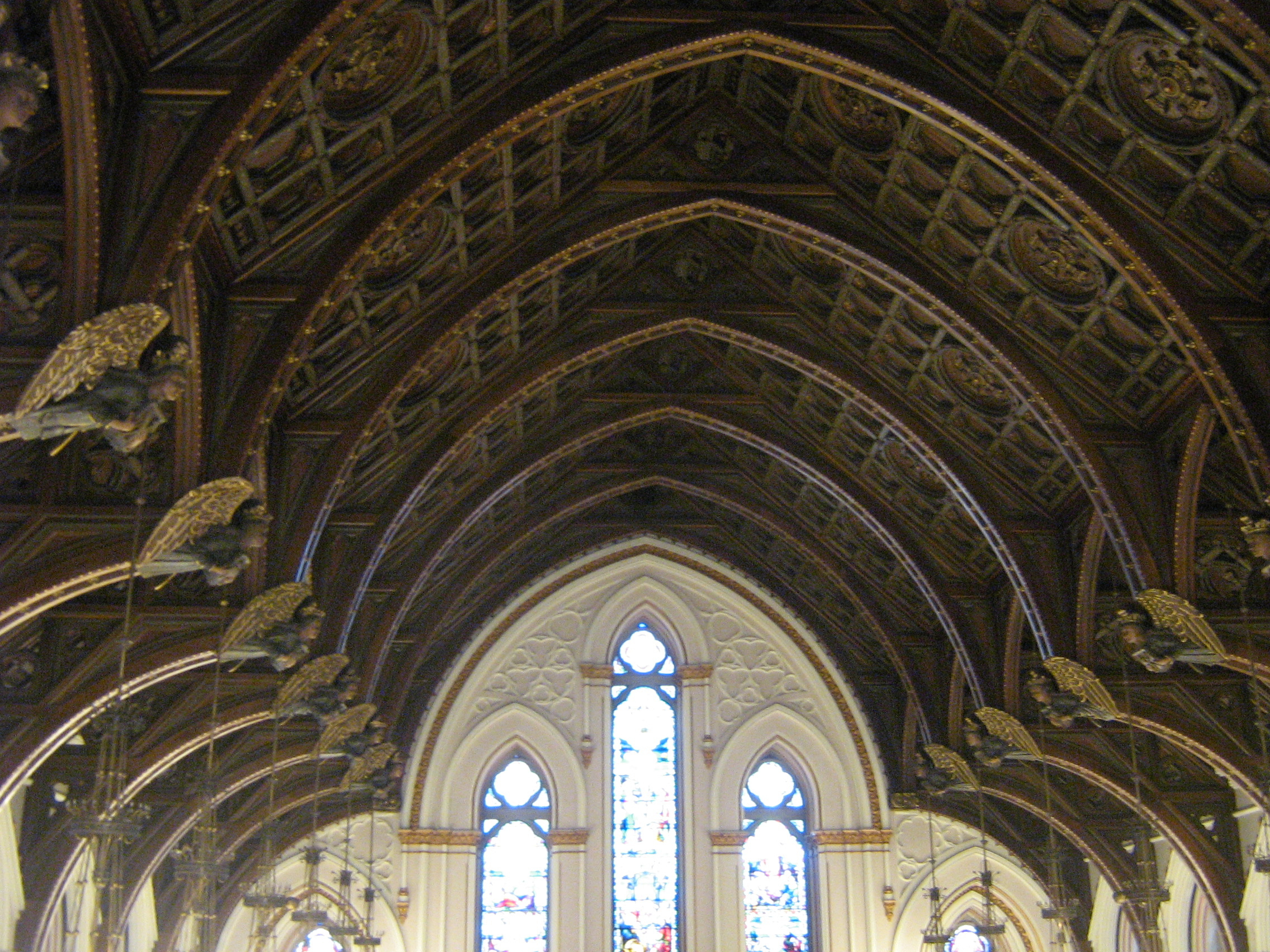
Hammerbeam ceiling, carved by Keely himself, at St. Mary, Charlestown, MA.(1887-1893)

The cornerstone of the second St. Francis Xavier Church (Manhattan) West 16th Street was laid in May, 1878 on land immediately to the west of the old church. Keely designed it in a "Roman Basilica" style, —the church has a Neo-baroque exterior with a façade of bluish-gray granite. The main entrance is sheltered by a gabled portico. The stained-glass windows, in a pre-Raphaelite style, were by the Morgan brothers, frequent collaborators of Keely. The church was dedicated by Archbishop Michael Corrigan on December 3, 1882. The current church has been in use since 1882 and underwent extensive restoration on 2001.

St. Mary's, Charlestown was commissioned by pastor John McMahon, the younger brother of Bishop Lawrence Stephen McMahon of the Diocese of Hartford, for whom Keely had built St. Joseph's Cathedral. The Gothic exterior combines Rockport granite with brick trim. The church is noted for its hammer-beam oak ceiling with angels, carved by Keely himself. The altar was likely designed by Thomas F.Houghton, Keely's son-in-law and principal draftsman.

== Cathedrals ==
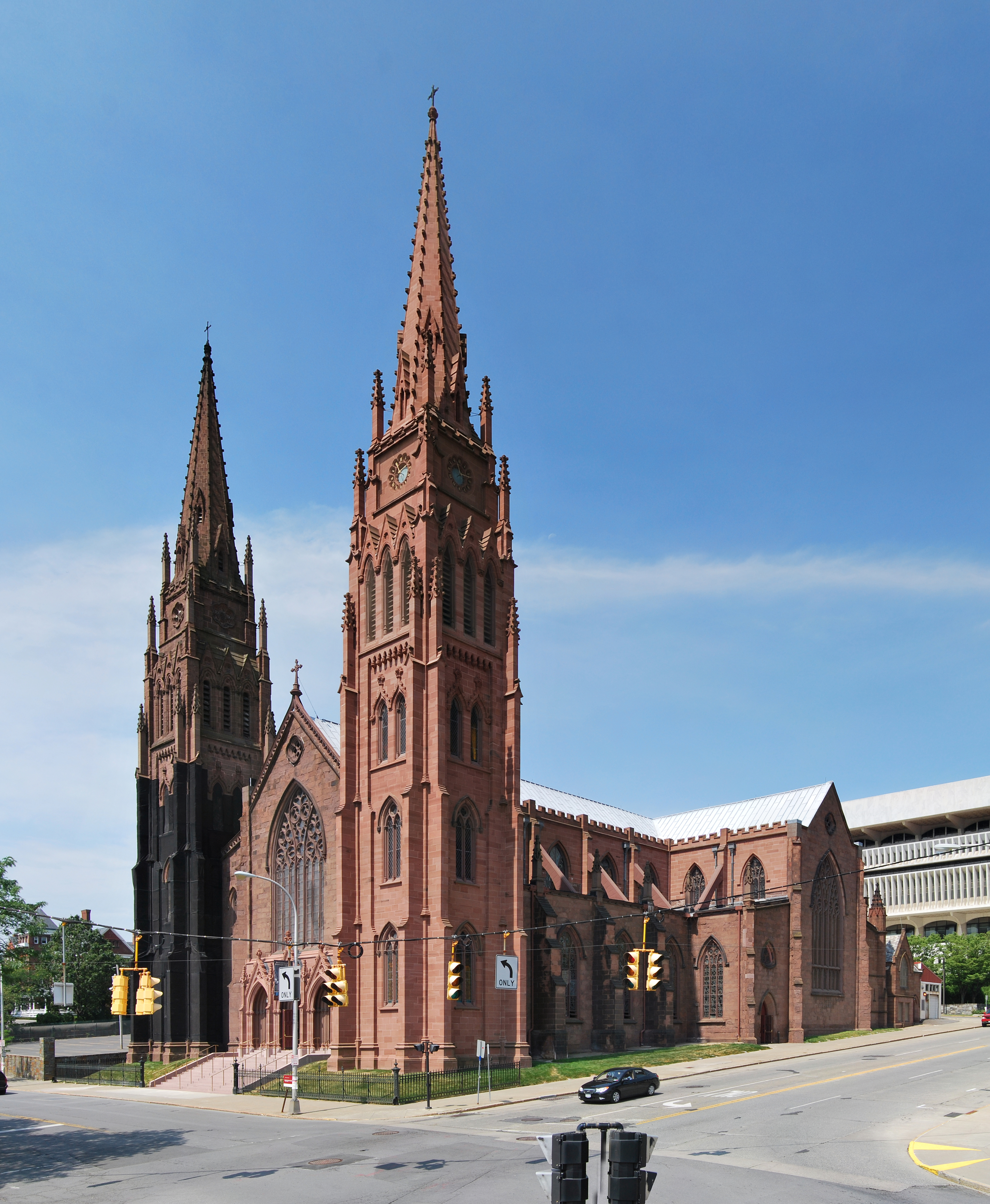
Cathedral of the Immaculate Conception, Albany

- The Cathedral of the Immaculate Conception (Albany, New York) was Keely's first cathedral. Keely was not a design pioneer, but he followed his era's architectural trends closely. For the cathedral he was most influenced by the ideas of British architect Augustus Pugin, as epitomized in Pugin's 1841 book True Principles. Building took place from 1848 to 1852. Most of the work was done by immigrants; many of them volunteered their time and effort. In 1976 it was listed on the National Register of Historic Places.
- The Cathedral of St. Mary of the Assumption (Fall River, Massachusetts) was built in 1852. The old church remained in place and continued in use while the new church was built around it. When it was time to put on the roof, the old church was dismantled and rebuilt in a near-by location. Parishioners helped in the construction of their new church. Keely designed it in an “Early English” mode of the Gothic Revival style. He later designed St. Joseph (1880) and St. Patrick (1881-1889) churches in Fall River. The cathedral and the entire steeple are stonework composed of native granite. The naves are covered by a shingled roof; the spire rises to a height of 190 feet (58 m). The main entrance is set in a shallow gabled frontispiece. Above it on the main facade is a rose window in the main gable. The interior includes intricate woodwork, with some gilding above the sanctuary. The structure is divided into three naves by granite columns. The central nave rises above the side naves that flank it forming a clerestory that is lined with windows. It is capped by a hammer-beam ceiling that rises 90 feet (27 m) above the floor. It was added to the National Register of Historic Places in 1983.

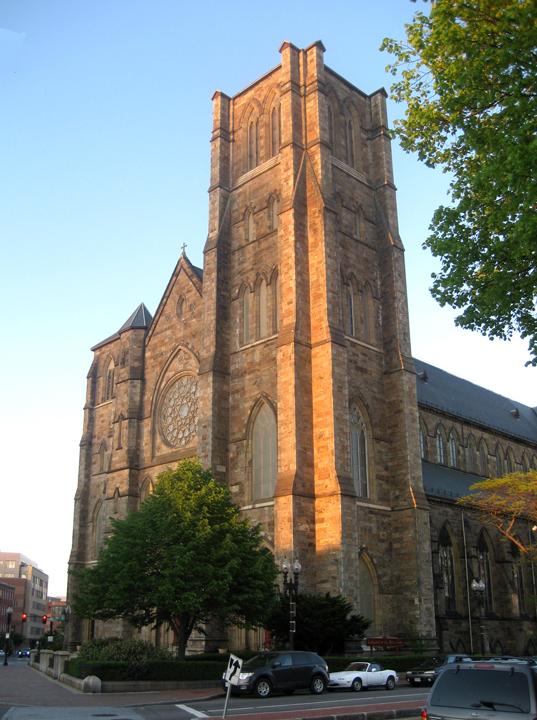
North and west facades of the Cathedral of the Holy Cross in Boston

- Construction of the Cathedral of the Holy Cross (Boston) commenced in 1867 and was completed in 1875. With local anti-Catholic sentiments a recent memory, the Gothic Revival edifice was intentionally massive, a statement that the Catholics of Boston were here to stay. Bricks from the 1834 riots in Charlestown, in which an Ursuline convent was burned down, were used in the arch over the front door. Built of Roxbury puddingstone with gray limestone trim, it reaches a height of 120 feet. Until the erection of the new Cathedral of St. Joseph (Hartford, Connecticut) in 1957, Holy Cross was the largest cathedral in New England. Supervision of the construction fell largely to Keely and his assistant John A. Dempwolf.
- After the Diocese of Providence was separated from the Diocese of Hartford in 1872, Hartford needed its own cathedral. The groundbreaking took place on August 30, 1876. Keely designed St. Joseph's as an Early Gothic structure, cruciform in shape and its exterior clad in Portland rough brownstone. Two square towers that rose 150 feet (46 m) flanked the main facade, recalling those of the Church of Notre Dame in Montreal, Canada. The interior featured an inlaid ceiling with wood from every country in the world, a rotunda with $100,000 worth of gold leaf, a bishop's throne of carved oak, a marble high altar, and 72 stained glass windows. The original St. Joseph's Cathedral, which was consecrated on May 8, 1892. A fire destroyed the cathedral on December 31, 1956. Its cause was never determined.
- When the Diocese of Providence was established, the old Cathedral of Saints Peter and Paul (Providence, Rhode Island) which had been built as the first Cathedral of the Diocese of Hartford, was in disrepair (part of the ceiling actually collapsed on the congregation during a Holy Week ceremony). Bishop Thomas Francis Hendricken, the first Bishop of Providence, also hired Keely to design a new cathedral. The new cathedrals in Hartford and Providence were both built of Connecticut Brownstone and showed a distinct resemblance in their exteriors. The interior of Sts. Peter and Paul has an elaborately coffered, carved, stenciled, and gilded ceiling of cypress wood which features a large painting of The Transfiguration over the Crossing which is surrounded by medallions of the Four Evangelists. They were painted by 19th Century Bavarian artist, William Lamprecht. The complete set of stained glass windows in the Cathedral was executed by the Tyrolese Art Glass Company of Innsbruck, Austria.

The three largest cathedrals in New England, Boston and Providence (both still standing), along with Hartford (lost to fire in 1956), were among Keely's greatest accomplishments.

Keely later partnered with his wife's brother-in-law, James Murphy in Brooklyn, New York, and Providence, Rhode Island, under the name Keely & Murphy from the 1860s to 1867, until Murphy opened his own practice in Providence. Keely worked throughout the eastern United States and Canada, primarily in the industrial mill towns and cities of the state of New York and New England, principally a designer of Roman Catholic churches or institutional buildings. Among his work were several cathedrals in the Northeast and "many of the more substantial parish churches" later "elevated to cathedral status during the twentieth century." He designed a few churches for Protestant congregations...."

Several later noteworthy architects began their careers with Keely's firm, including Elliott Lynch, James Farmer (his wife's brother), James Murphy (his wife's brother-in-law), his son John J. Keely (died 1879, Brooklyn), and son-in-law, Thomas F. Houghton. His son, Charles Keely, an architect in his father's firm died in December 1889 at the age of thirty-five of pneumonia, while in Hartford, consulting with the bishop on business.

In 1884, University of Notre Dame awarded Keely its Laetare Medal. The medal has been awarded annually to a Catholic “whose genius has ennobled the arts and sciences, illustrated the ideals of the Church and enriched the heritage of humanity.” Established in 1883, Keely was the second person to receive the award after historian John Gilmary Shea.

Keely died on August 11, 1896, after a long illness, while still directing the completion of several churches with his son-in-law, Thomas Houghton. He was buried in Holy Cross Cemetery, Brooklyn, under an inconspicuous polished granite block embossed "KEELY."

== Works ==
Arkansas

- Cathedral of St. Andrew, Little Rock

Connecticut

- Church of St. Mary, the Immaculate Conception, Derby
- Sacred Heart Church, Waterbury
- Cathedral of St. Augustine (1868), Bridgeport
- Assumption Church, Ansonia
- St. Mary of the Immaculate Conception Church, Baltic
- St. Peter Church, Danbury (Keely and Murphy)
- Cathedral of St. Joseph Hartford (burned 1956)
- St. John's Church, Middletown

District of Columbia

- St. Dominic Catholic Church (Washington, D.C.) (1865).

Illinois

- Cathedral of the Holy Name, Chicago (1874)
- St. James Church, Chicago (demolished, 2014)
- Nativity of Our Lord Catholic Church, Chicago (1868)
- St. Stanislaus Kostka Church, Chicago (1871)
- St. Mary Carmelite Church, Joliet

Louisiana

- St. Joseph Church, New Orleans (1869-1875)

Maine

- Cathedral of the Immaculate Conception (1869), Portland
- St. Joseph's Church (1865), Lewiston
- St. John's Church (1855), Bangor

Maryland

- Corpus Christi Church, Baltimore
- St. Joseph's Monastery's Shrine Church Baltimore
- Congregation of the Passionists' Rectory Baltimore

Massachusetts

- Immaculate Conception Church, Newburyport
- Holy Trinity Church, Boston
- Our Lady of Victories Church, Boston
- St. James Church, Boston
- St. Mary's Church, Boston (demolished 1977)
- St. Mary's Church, Taunton
- St. Francis De Sales Church, Roxbury (original building, demolished)
- 1859: St. Francis de Sales Church, Charlestown
- St. Augustine Church, South Boston
- St. Vincent de Paul Church, South Boston
- Sts. Peter and Paul Church, South Boston (rebuild of original church by J. Fox Bryant)
- St. Peter Church Dorchester
- St. Margaret Church, Dorchester (with Thomas Houghton)
- St. Thomas Aquinas Church, Jamaica Plain
- Church of the Holy Redeemer, East Boston
- Church of the Assumption, East Boston
- St. John Church, Cambridge (with James Murphy)
- Sacred Heart Church, Cambridge (with Patrick W. Ford)
- Sacred Heart Church, Weymouth (burned 2005)
- Sacred Hearts Church, Malden
- Sacred Heart Church, Lynn
- St. Mary Church, Lawrence
- St. Patrick's Church (1853), Lowell
- St. Michael Church, Lowell
- Church of the Immaculate Conception, Lowell
- St. Peter Church, Lowell (demolished)
- St. Paul Church, Hingham
- St. Joseph's Church, Fall River
- St. Patrick's Church, Fall River
- St. Lawrence, Martyr Church, New Bedford
- Cathedral of St. Michael, Springfield
- Holy Name of Jesus Church, Chicopee
- St. Joseph Church, Pittsfield
- St. Jerome Church, Holyoke

Michigan

- Most Holy Trinity Church, Detroit

New Hampshire

- Cathedral of St. Joseph, Manchester (with Patrick W. Ford)

New Jersey

- St. Bridget Church, Jersey City
- St. Patrick Church, Jersey City
- St. Peter Church and College Jersey City
- St. Michael Church, Jersey City
- Church of the Sacred Heart, New Brunswick
- St. Peter the Apostle Church, New Brunswick 91856)
- Cathedral of St. John the Baptist, Paterson (1865)
- Church of the Sacred Heart Mt. Holly
- St Patrick's Pro-Cathedral Newark
- St. Mary Church, South Amboy

New York

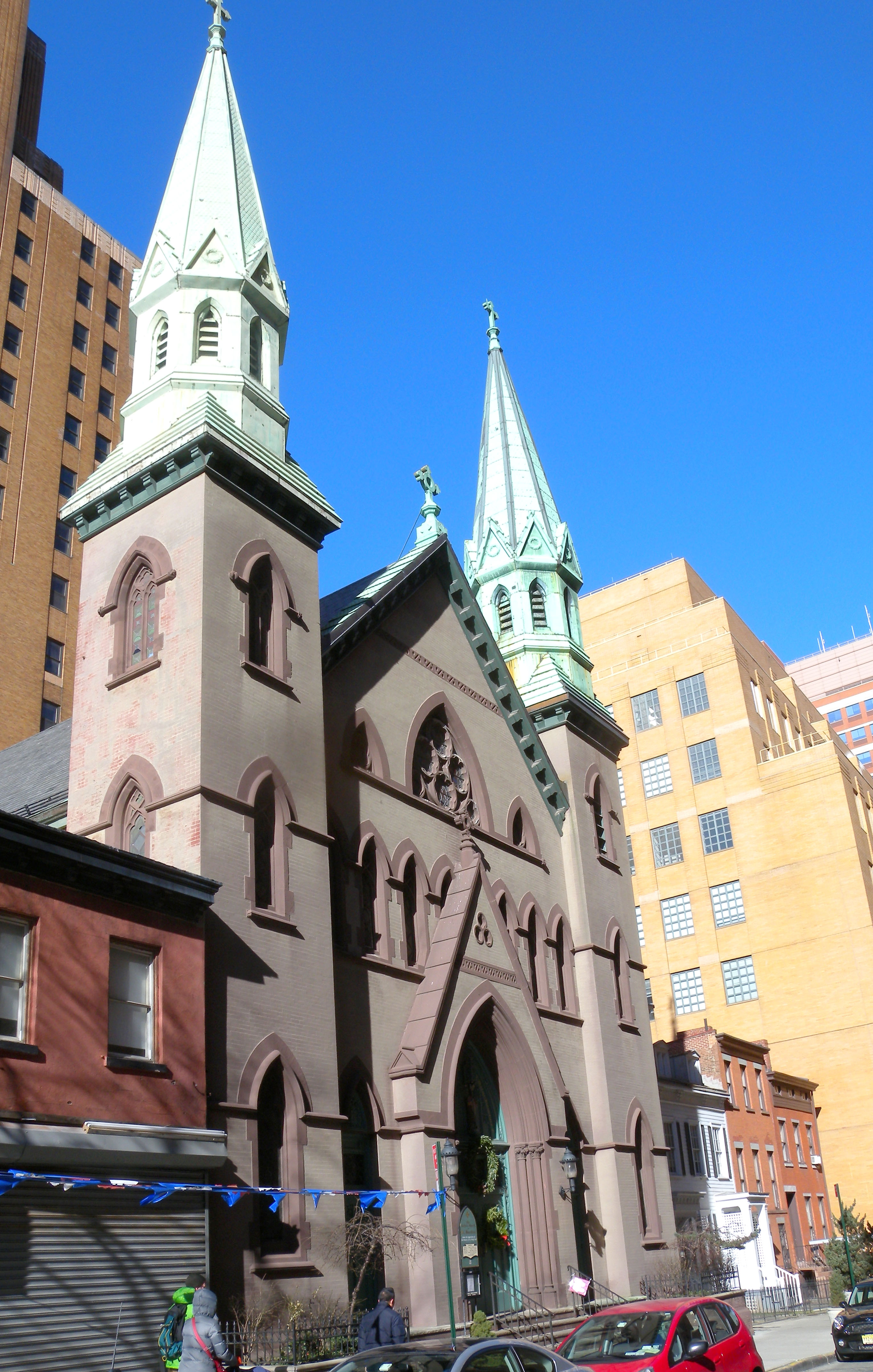
St. Boniface Church, Brooklyn

- St. Ann's Church, Brooklyn (1860), northwest corner of Gold and Front Streets -razed in 1992.

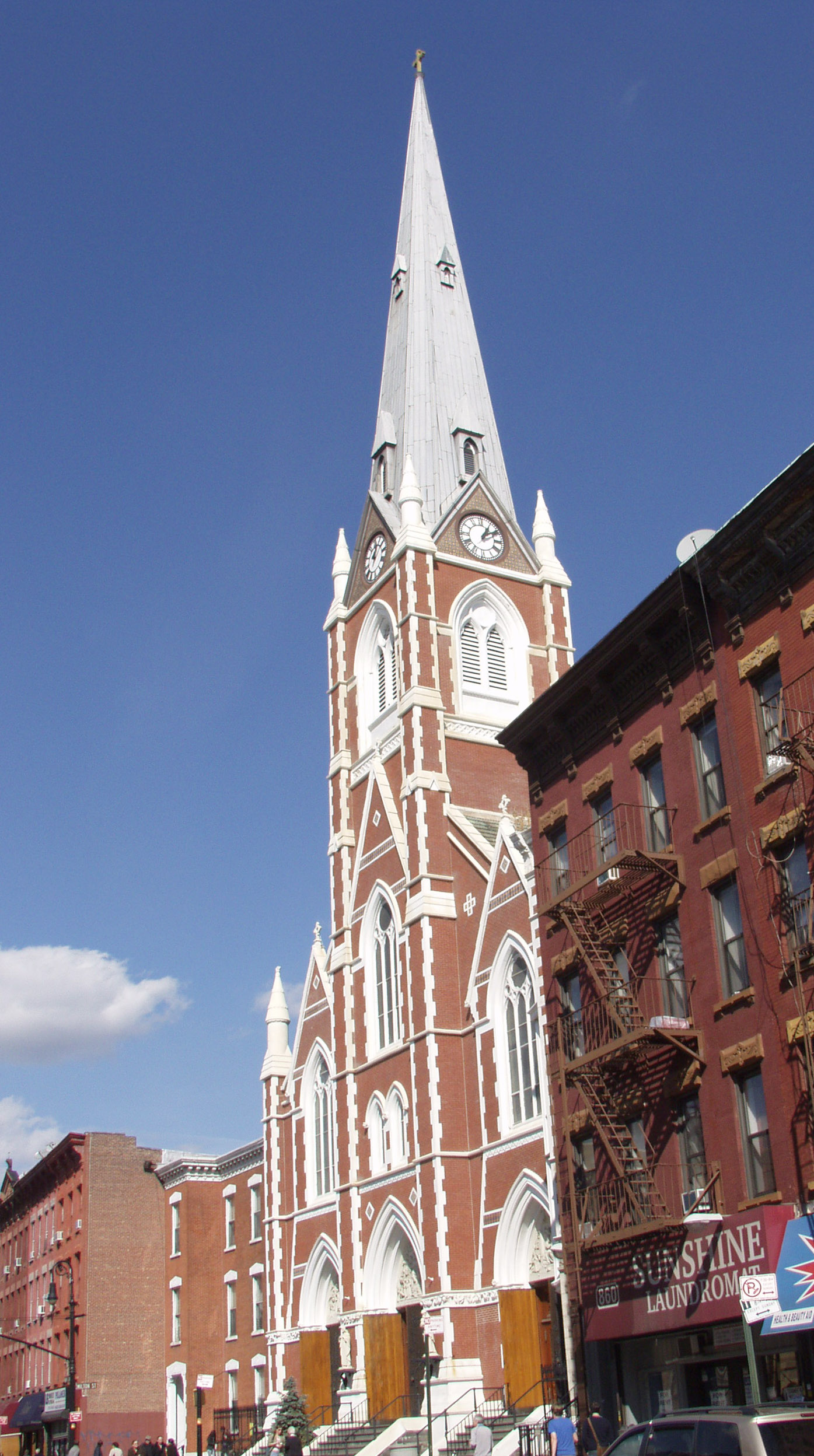
St Anthony of Padua, Brooklyn

- St. Anthony of Padua's Church (Greenpoint, Brooklyn) -In 1975, St. Alphonsus Church was merged into St. Anthony Church, after which the church was renamed St. Anthony – St. Alphonsus Catholic Church.
- Church of St. Stephen (Brooklyn, New York) -almost completely destroyed by fire in 1951 and rebuilt.
- St. Bernard's Church (1873–1875) (now the home of Our Lady of Guadalupe Parish)
- St. Boniface Church, Brooklyn (now the Brooklyn Oratory)
- St. Charles Borromeo Church (1868), 21 Sidney Place, Brooklyn, "reputedly his 325th church design."
- Church of the Holy Innocents, Manhattan (completed 1870)
- St. Joseph Cathedral, Buffalo
- St. Joseph's Church, Albany (1855-1860, closed)
- St. Mary Church, Yonkers (an early church by Keely, replaced in 1880)
- St. Mary Church, Auburn, 1867–70
- St. Vincent de Paul Church, Brooklyn
- St. John the Baptist Roman Catholic Church, Brooklyn

Ohio

- Cathedral of St. John the Evangelist, Cleveland
- St. John the Baptist Church, Canton
- Church of St. Francis de Sales, Toledo (Parish closed, 2005, still open for daily noon Mass)
- Saints Peter and Paul Catholic Church (Sandusky, Ohio)
- St. Martin's Catholic Church, Valley City

Pennsylvania

- St. Peter Cathedral (1873–1875), Erie
- St. Joseph Church, Erie
- Church of the Assumption, (Philadelphia, Pennsylvania)
- St. John the Baptist Church (1894), Philadelphia, Pennsylvania

Rhode Island

- Cathedral of Saints Peter and Paul (1878), Providence (NRHP)
- St. Charles Borromeo Church, Woonsocket (1867) (NRHP)
- St. Joseph's Roman Catholic Church (Providence, Rhode Island) (1851) (NRHP)
- St. Mary Church (1848), Newport (NRHP)

South Carolina

- St. Patrick Church, Charleston
- Cathedral of Saint John and Saint Finbar, Charleston (1850–1854, burned December 1861), rebuilt as the Cathedral of Saint John the Baptist (1907, completed March 2010)

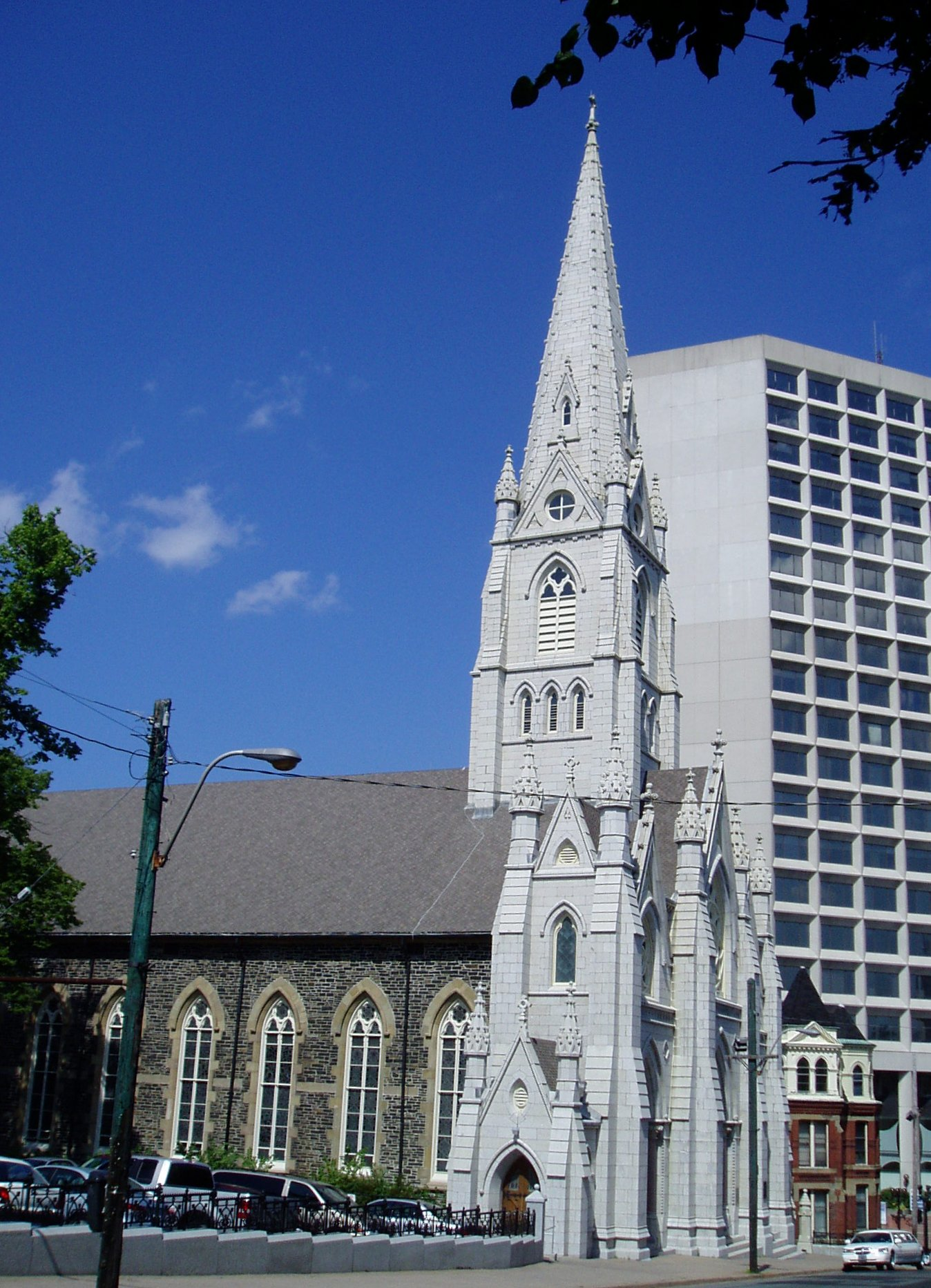
St. Mary's Basilica, Halifax, Nova Scotia

Tennessee

- St. Peter Catholic Church (1852–55), Memphis

Vermont

- Cathedral of the Immaculate Conception, Burlington (burned 1972)
- St. Peter's Church, Rutland, Vermont
- St. Bridget Church, West Rutland, Vermont

West Virginia

- St. Francis Xavier Church, Parkersburg

Wisconsin

- St. Bernard's Church, Watertown

Canada

- Blessed Virgin's Chapel, Saint John, NB
- Church of Le Gesù (1865), Montreal, Quebec
- St. Mary's Basilica (1820–1899), Halifax, Nova Scotia
- St. Michael's Basilica, Miramichi, Chatham, New Brunswick
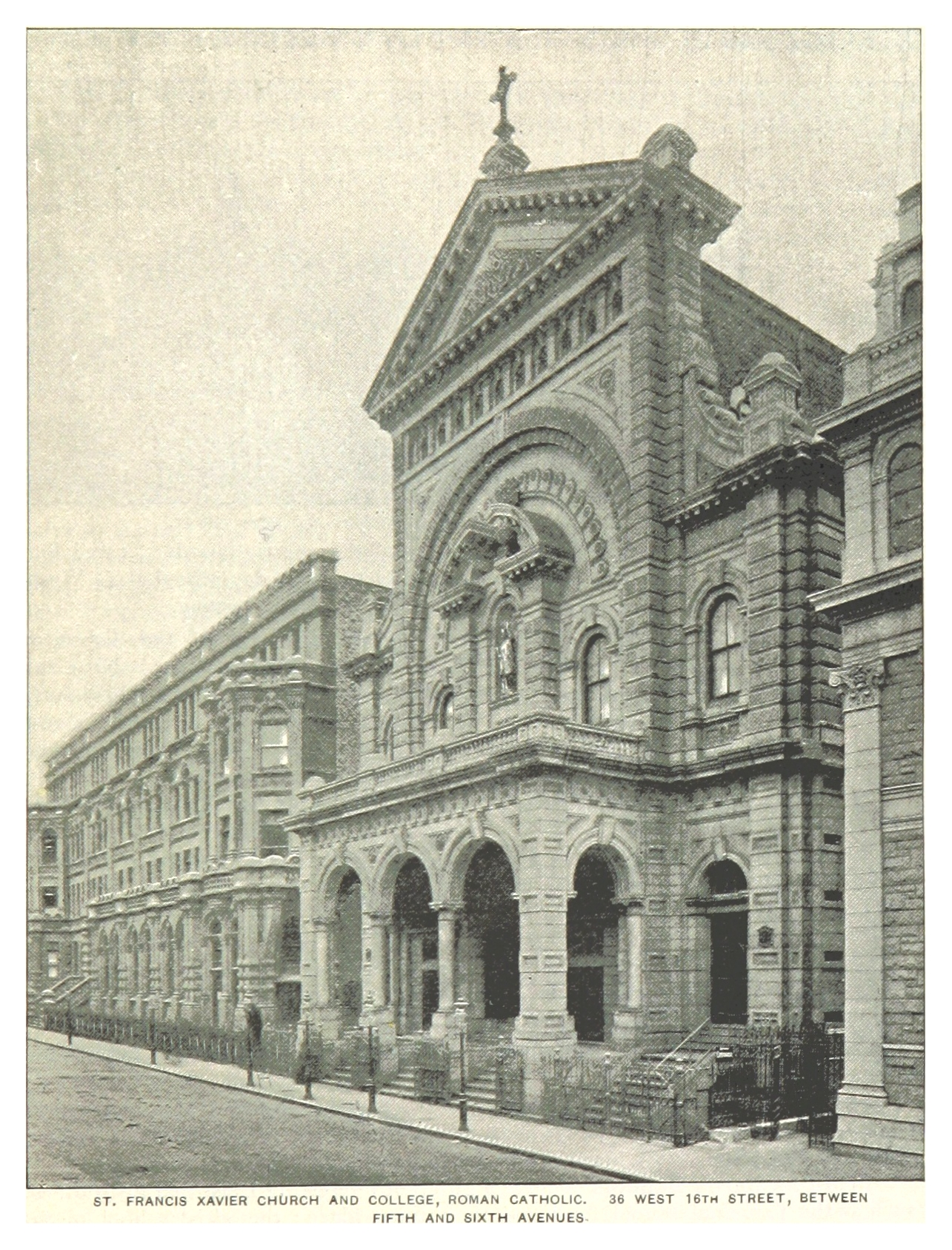
St. Francis Xavier, 36 W 16th St

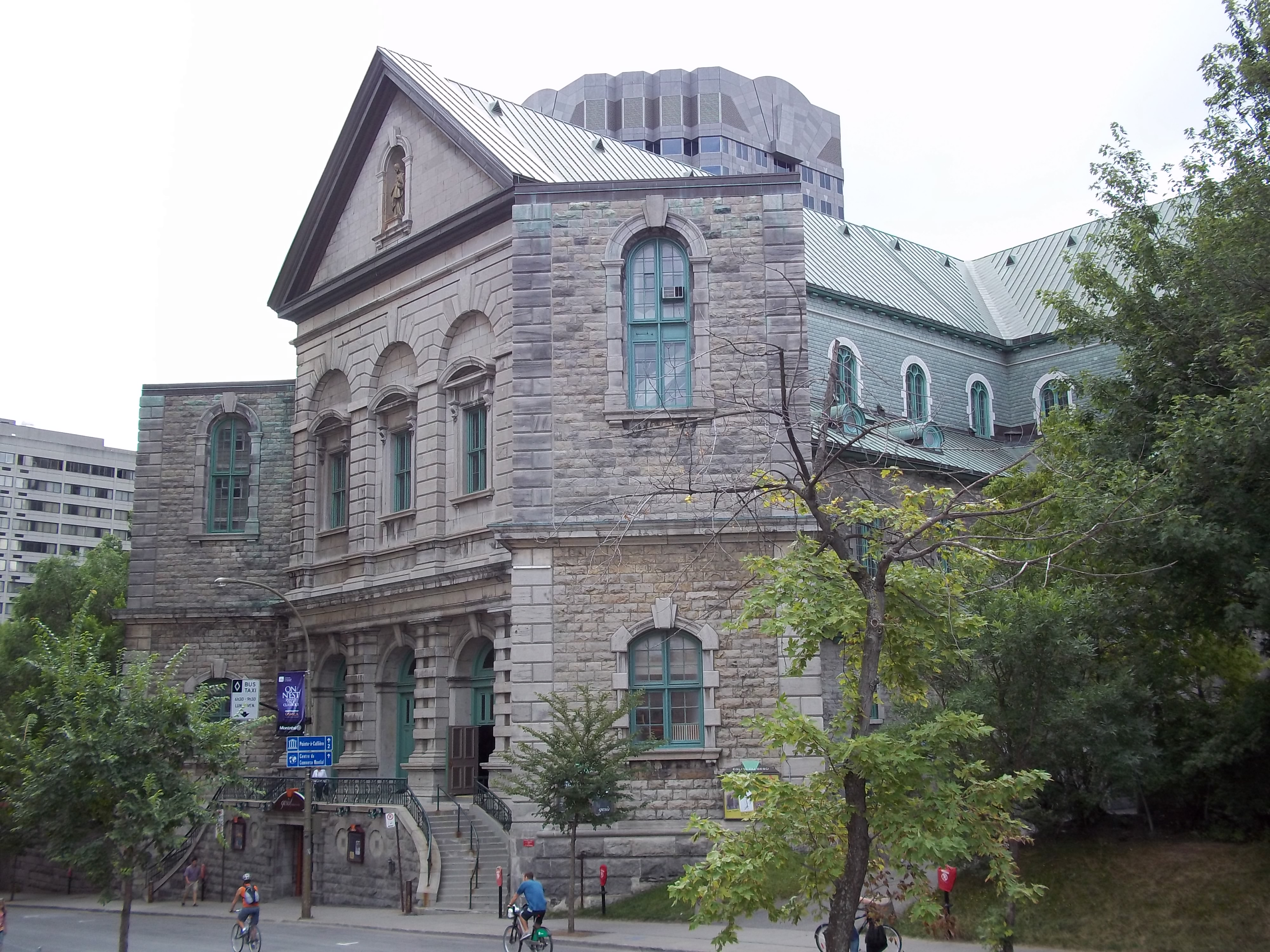
Gesu Montreal (1865)

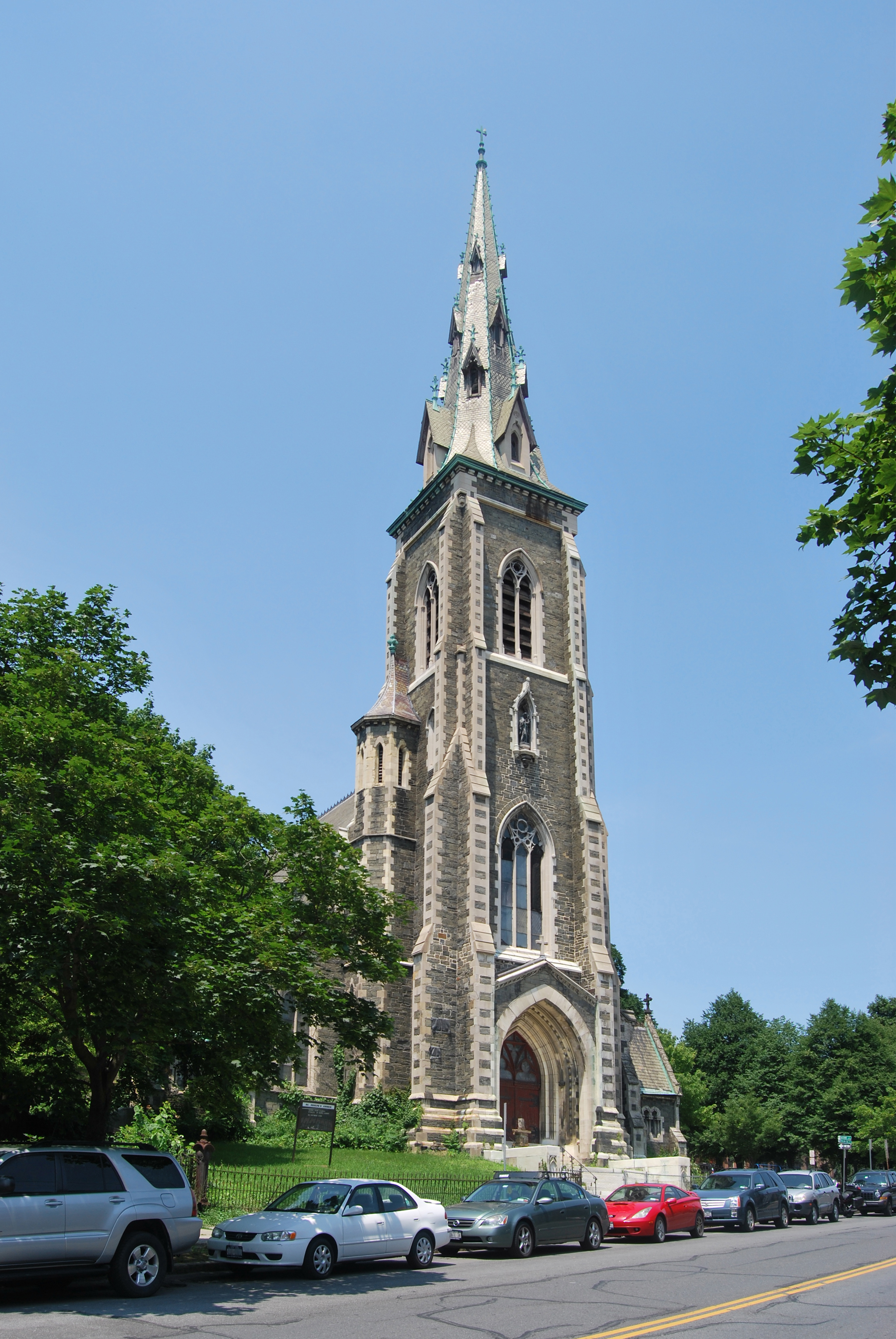
Saint Josephs Church, Albany
