= St. Patrick's Church (Lowell, Massachusetts) =

Historic church in Massachusetts, United States

- U.S. National Register of Historic Places
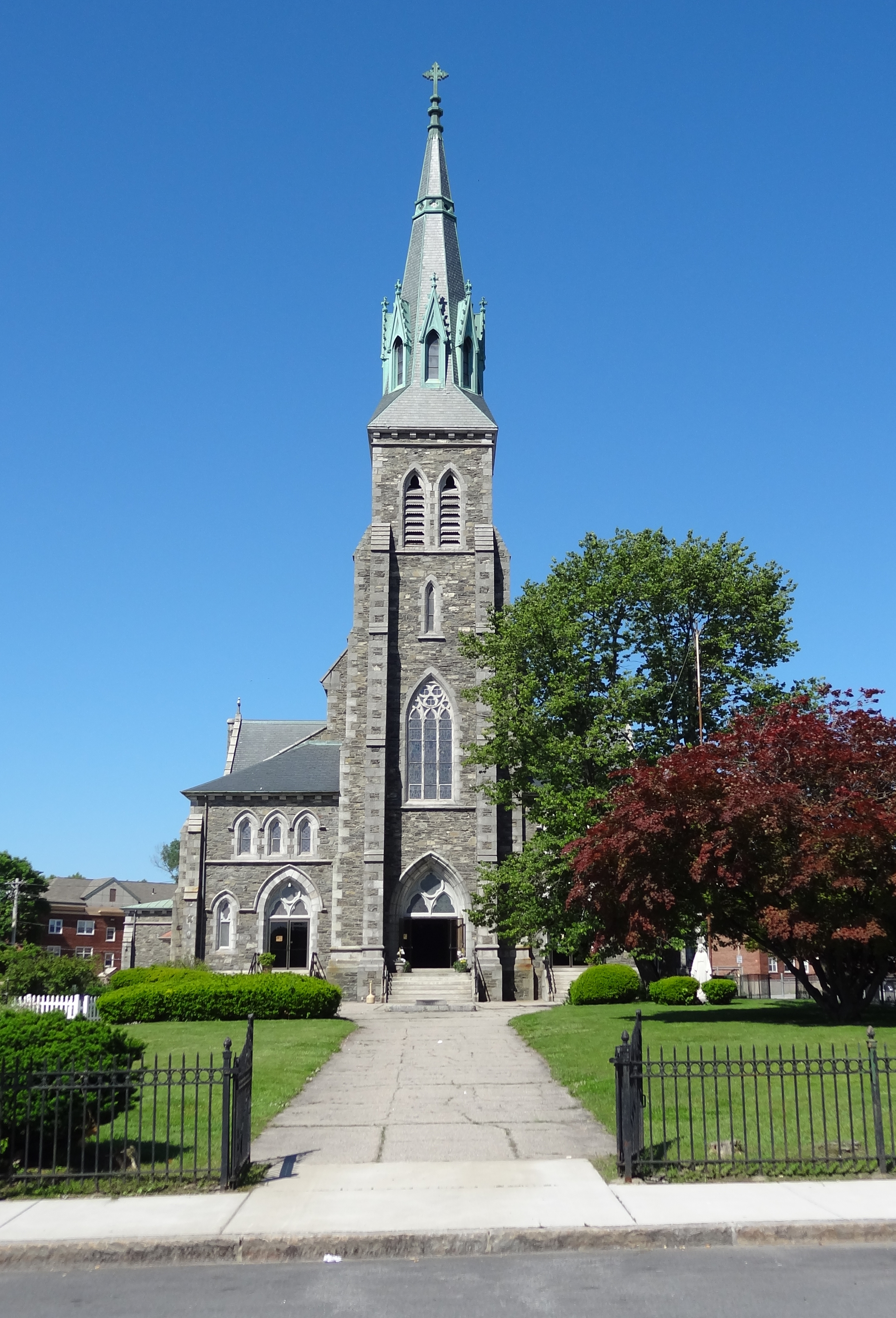
- St. Patrick's, front view (2012)
- Location: 284 Suffolk St. Lowell, Massachusetts
- Coordinates: 42°38′43.05″N 71°19′7.1″W
- Area: less than one acre
- Built: 1853
- Architect: Patrick C. Keely
- Architectural style: Gothic Revival
- NRHP reference No.: 85000027
- Added to NRHP: January 3, 1985

St. Patrick's Church is a historic Roman Catholic church at 284 Suffolk Street in Lowell, Massachusetts. Built in 1853 for a predominantly Irish congregation founded in 1831. It is one of the oldest Catholic parishes north of Boston in the United States. The building is a fine example of Gothic Revival architecture designed by the noted ecclesiastical architect Patrick C. Keely, was listed on the National Register of Historic Places in 1985.

== History ==
The original Saint Patrick's church was a wooden structure, built in 1831 to support the Irish workmen who had moved to Lowell, largely to work on the Pawtucket and Merrimack Canals. Prior to its construction, they were attended by Rev. John Mahoney, a Catholic clergyman from a nearby town. By 1830 there were over 400 Roman Catholics in Lowell, and on July 3, 1831, St Patrick's Church was consecrated, led by Mahoney. Mahoney left in 1836 to work in Boston, and was succeeded by E.J. McCool.

The current stone structure dates to 1853, although a fire in 1904 caused much of the church to be rebuilt by 1906.

== Today ==
Today, the church is listed on the National Register of Historic Places. In addition to the traditional Irish and French Canadian congregations, the parish, including its school, serves local Southeast Asians, specifically with Vietnamese and Cambodian native-language Masses.

== Architecture ==
St. Patrick's is located on the eastern edge of the Lowell neighborhood known as The Acre, an area where Irish immigrants originally settled in squatters' camps to work in Lowell's mills. The church overlooks one the city's power canals, at the junction of Suffolk and Cross Streets. It is built in a cruciform plan out of coursed rubblestone with ashlar granite trim. A tower 160 feet (49 m) in height projects from the front facade, with stone buttresses flanking the main church entrance at its base. The main entrance and the flanking side entrances are set within Gothic lancet-arched openings, above which is a three-part lancet-arched window; the tower's tall first stage includes a smaller lancet window, while the second stage housed a belfry with louvered lancet-arched openings and is topped by octagonal steeple decorated with lancet dormers.

== Gallery ==
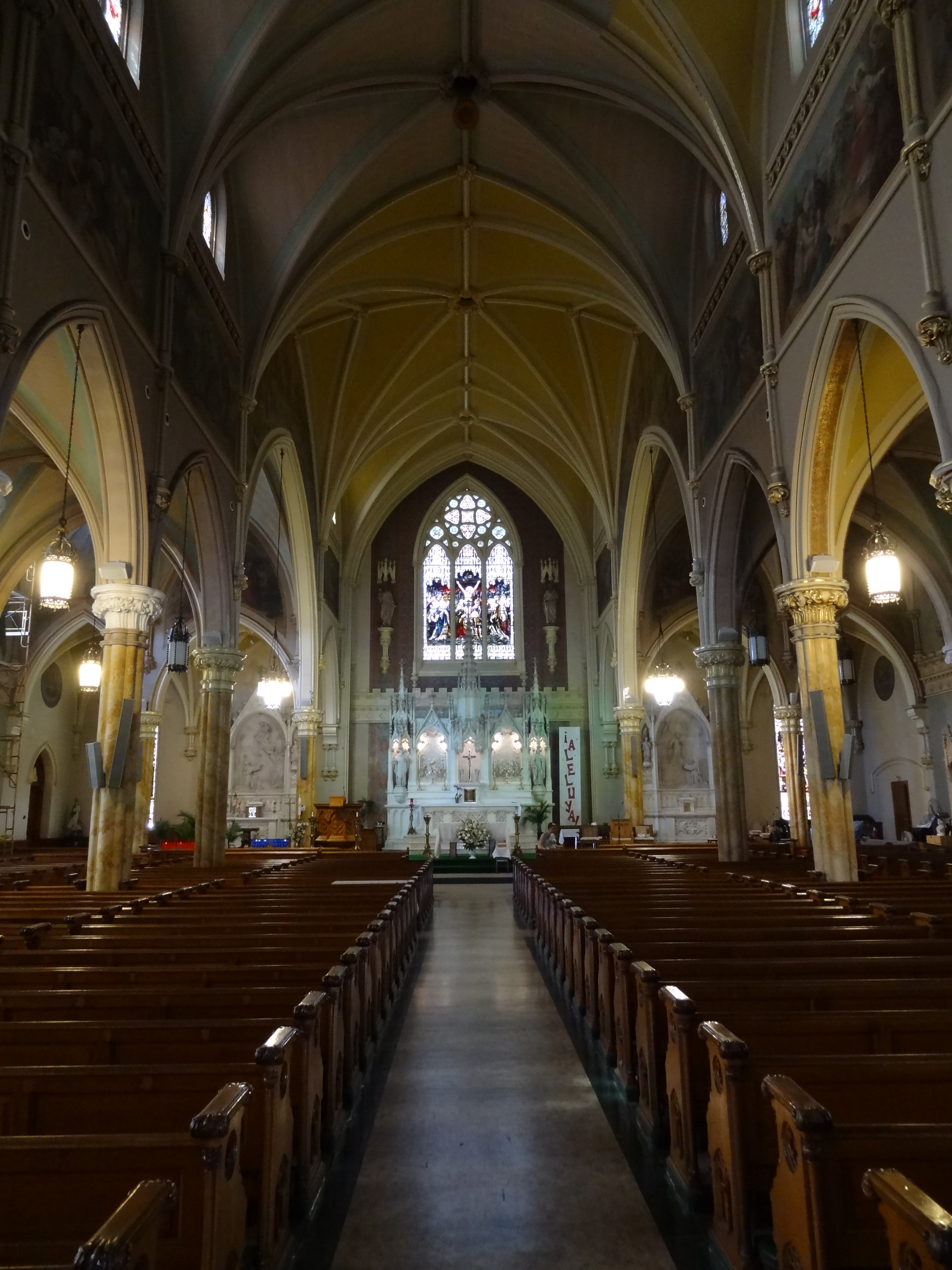
The church's nave and altar.

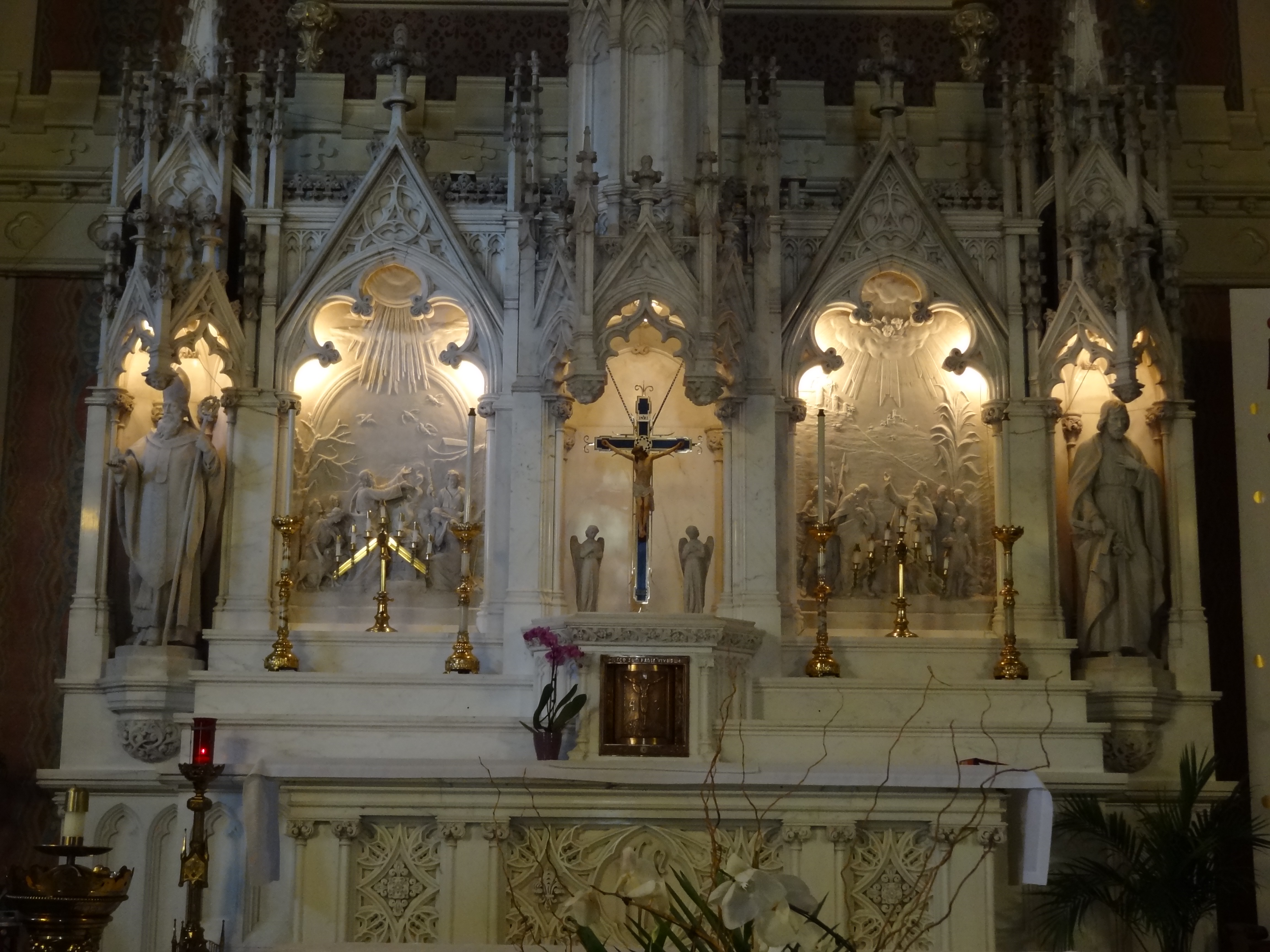
detail.

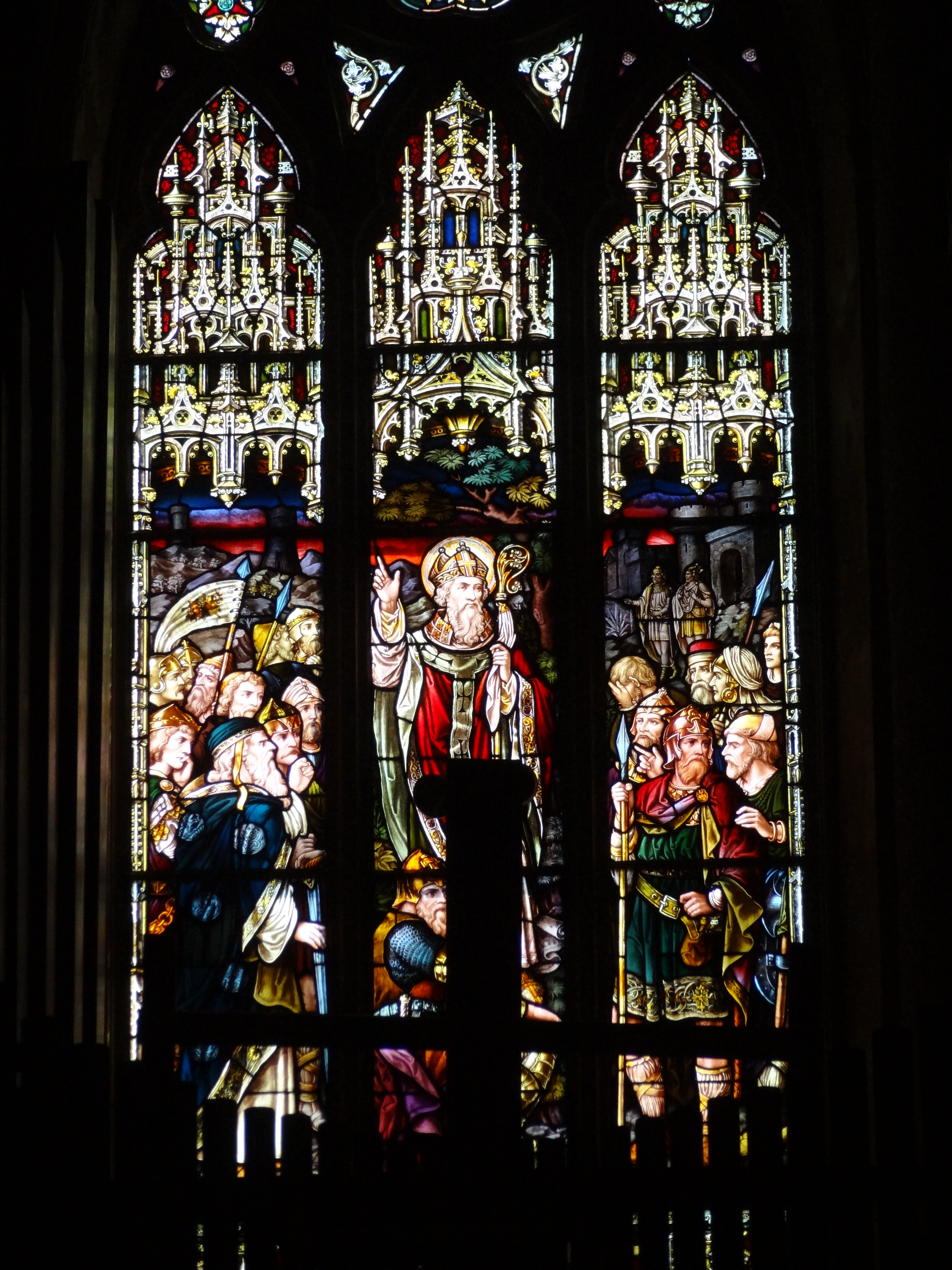
Saint Patrick Teaching the Chieftains at Tara stained glass window above main entrance.

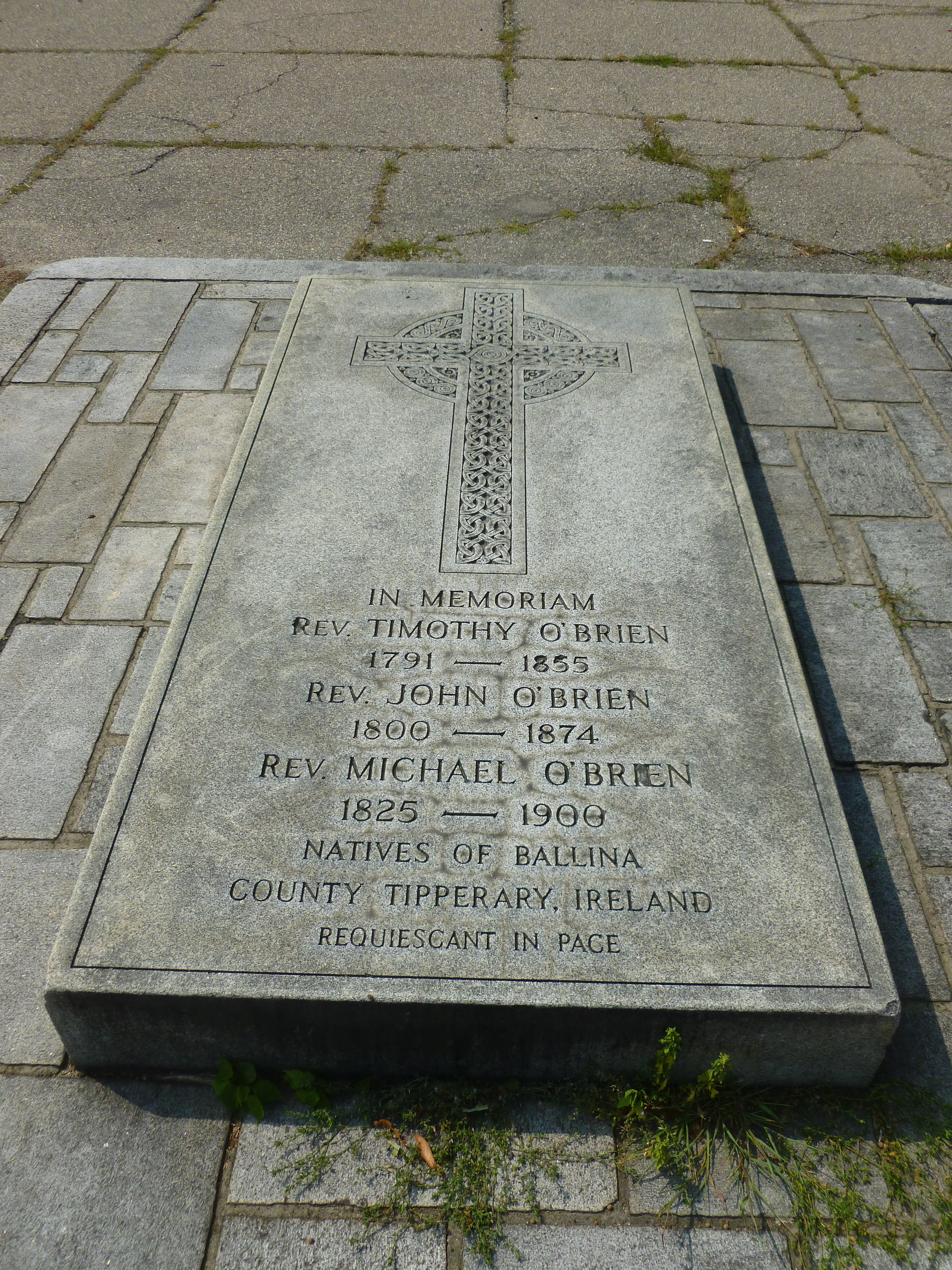
Memorial to Reverends O'Brien immediately outside main entrance.

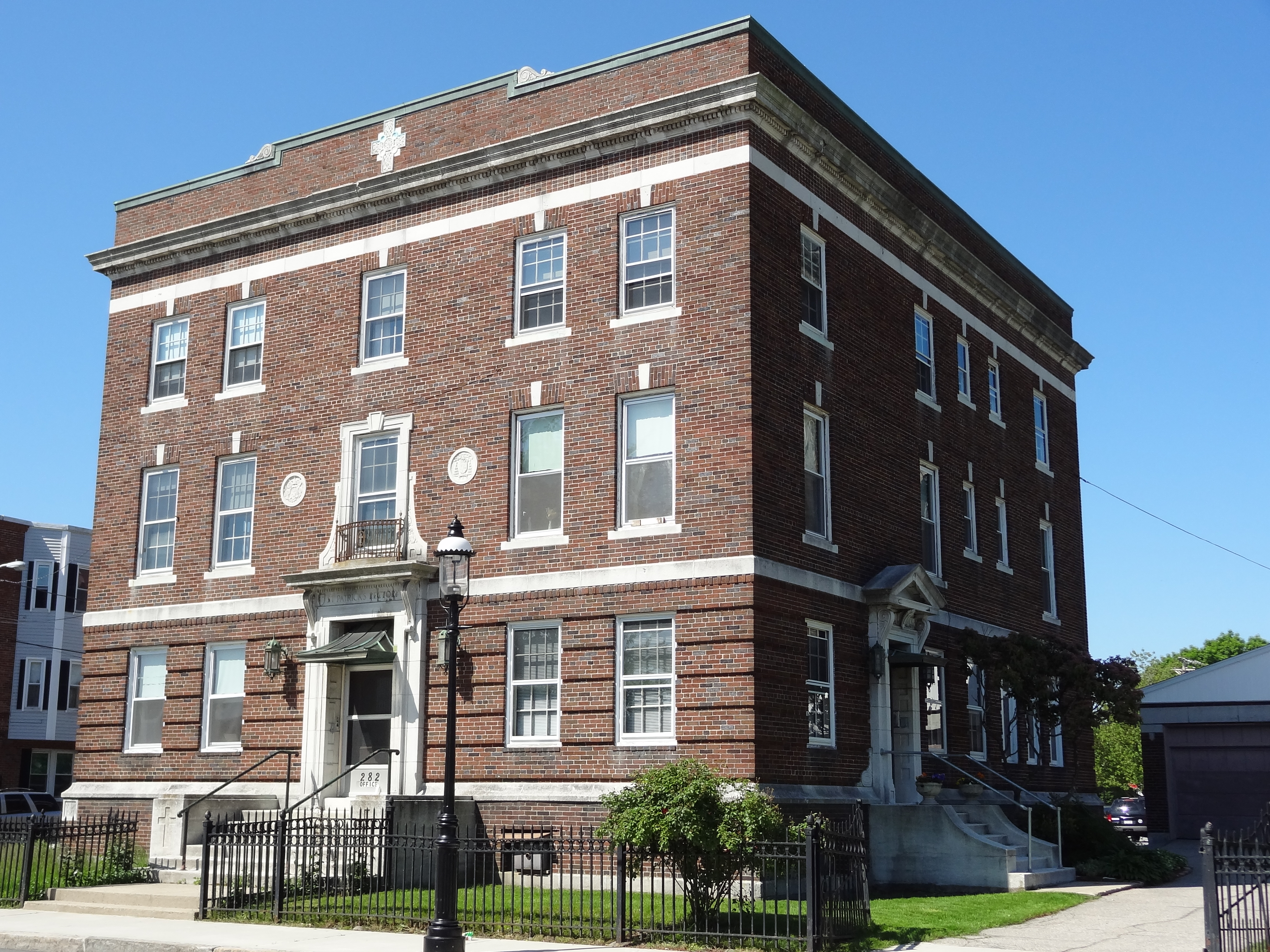
The church rectory.

== See also ==
- National Register of Historic Places listings in Lowell, Massachusetts

== Bibliography ==
- Citizen-Courier Company (1897). Illustrated History of Lowell and Vicinity: Massachusetts. Higginson Book Company.
- Eno, Arthur (1976). Cotton Was King: a History of Lowell, Massachusetts. New Hampshire Publishing Society. ISBN 0912274611.
