= St. Joseph's Roman Catholic Church (Providence, Rhode Island) =

Historic church in Rhode Island, United States

- U.S. National Register of Historic Places
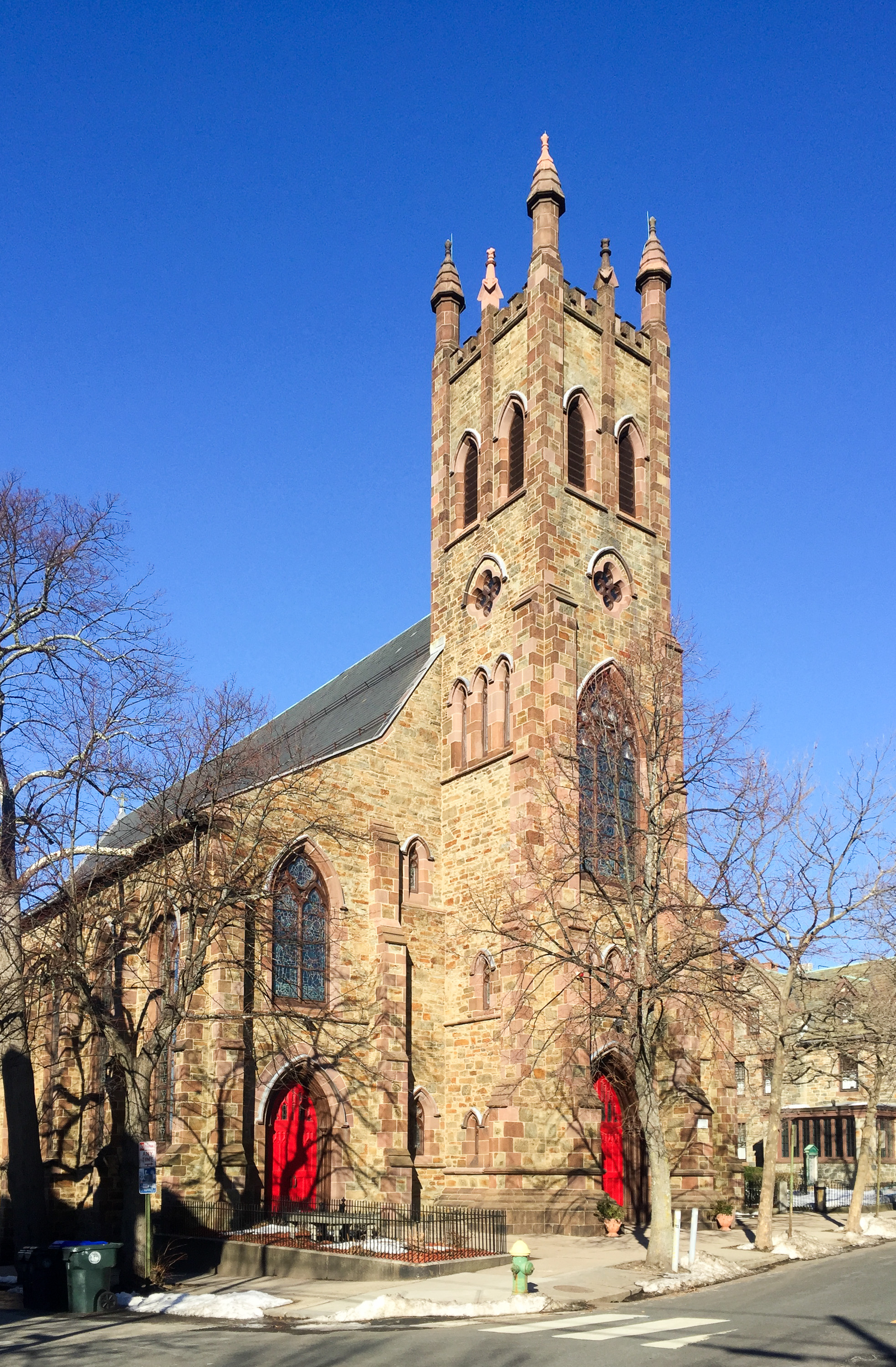

- Location within Rhode Island Location within the United States
- Location: Providence, Rhode Island
- Coordinates: 41°49′17″N 71°23′50″W
- Built: 1851
- Architect: Patrick C. Keely
- Architectural style: Gothic
- Website: https://stjosephprovidence.org
- NRHP reference No.: 74000004
- Added to NRHP: July 15, 1974

St. Joseph's Roman Catholic Church is a historic church at 86 Hope Street in Providence, Rhode Island within the Diocese of Providence.

== Description ==
St. Joseph's was designed by the noted Irish-born architect, Patrick C. Keely and built in 1851–53. It is a large rectangular structure with a steeply pitched gable roof, and a square tower protruding from the front facade. It is faced in ashlar stone with brownstone trim. The sides are supported in part by buttresses. The building is the oldest Roman Catholic Church built of stone in the state. St. Mary's Church, a wood-frame structure dating to 1844 in the Crompton section of the town of West Warwick, is the oldest Catholic church in Rhode Island.

The church was listed on the National Register of Historic Places in 1974.

Broadway actor and dancer George M. Cohan was baptized at the church in 1878.

== See also ==
- Catholic Church in the United States
- Catholic parish church
- Index of Catholic Church articles
- National Register of Historic Places listings in Providence, Rhode Island
- Pastoral care
