= St. Patrick's Church (Fall River, Massachusetts) =

Historic church in Massachusetts, United States

- U.S. National Register of Historic Places
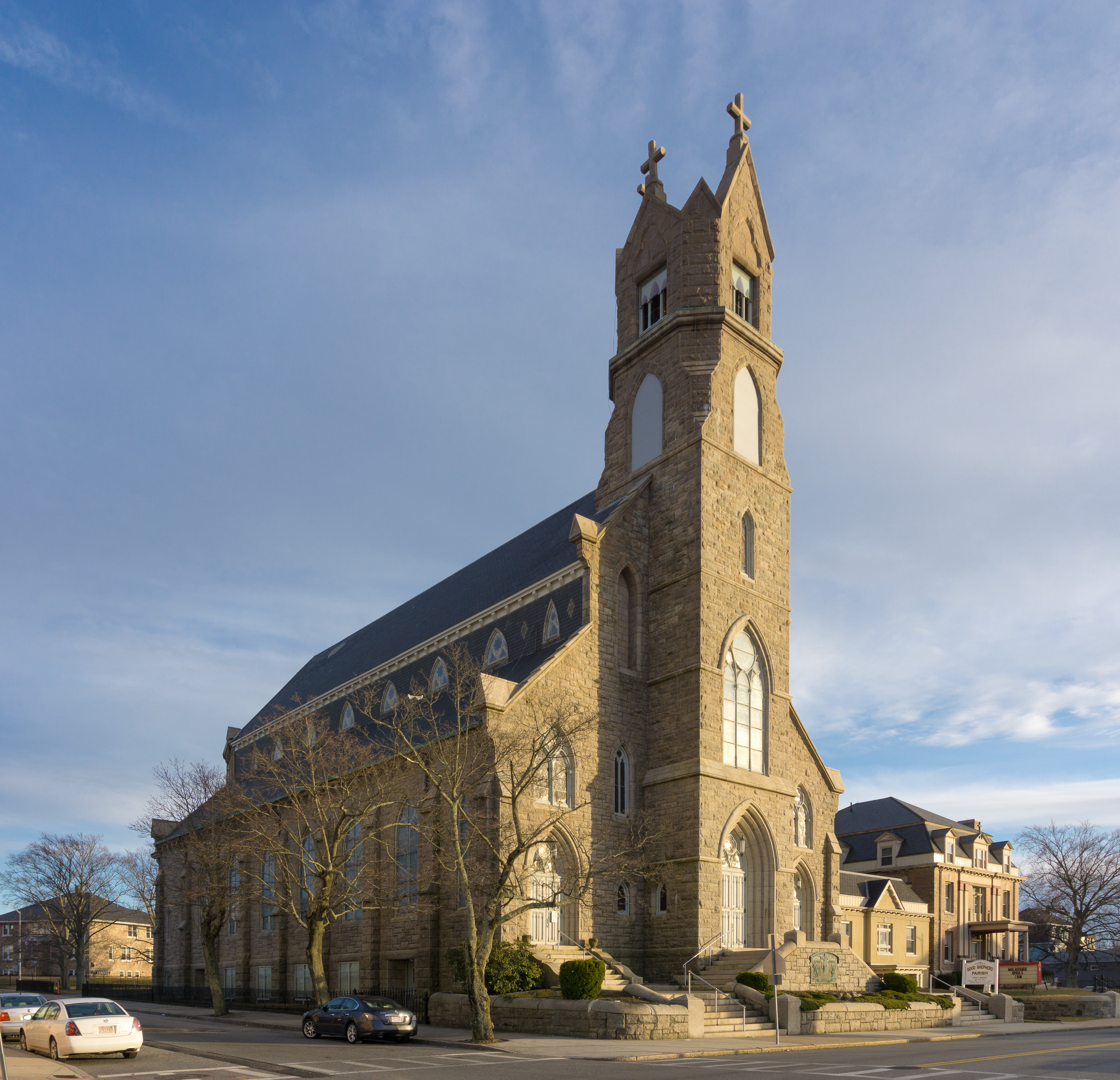

- Location within Massachusetts Location within the United States
- Location: Fall River, Massachusetts
- Coordinates: 41°41′8″N 71°10′23″W
- Built: 1881
- Architect: Patrick C. Keely
- Architectural style: Gothic
- MPS: Fall River MRA
- NRHP reference No.: 83000724
- Added to NRHP: February 16, 1983

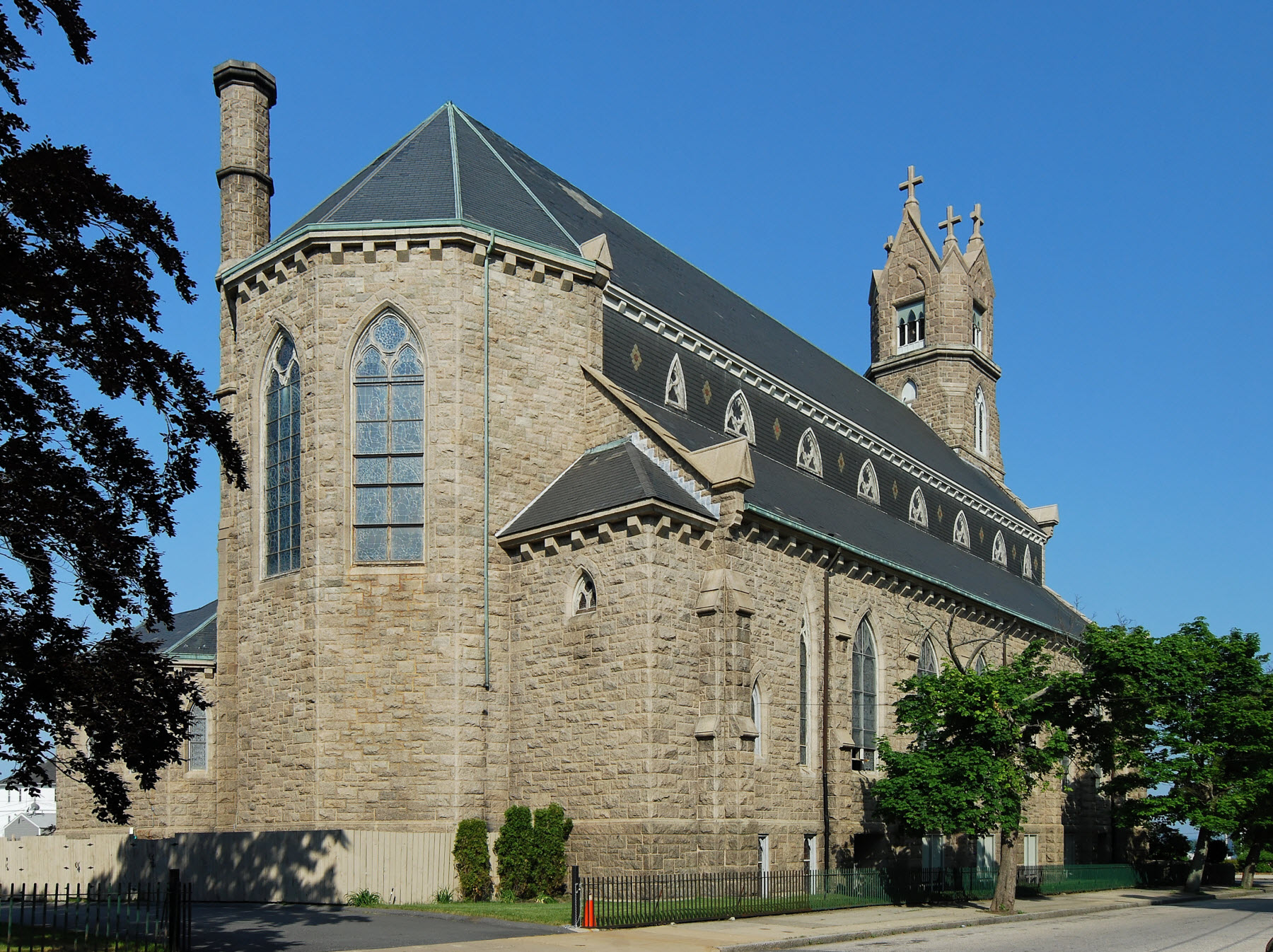

St. Patrick's Church is a historic church building at 1598 South Main Street in Fall River, Massachusetts. It was built in 1881 from local Fall River granite and added to the National Register of Historic Places in 1983.

St. Patrick's Parish was established in 1873 as a division of St. Mary's Parish, a predominantly-Irish congregation. In 2002, the church was part of a three-parish merger of St. Patrick's, Blessed Sacrament, and Our Lady of the Angels to form the Parish of the Good Shepherd. In 2018, it became part of the Catholic Community of Central Fall River, a collaborative of parishes that includes Good Shepherd, the Cathedral of St. Mary of the Assumption, and St. Stanislaus Parish and School.

== See also ==
- National Register of Historic Places listings in Fall River, Massachusetts
