= Louis Destremps =

Louis Destremps may refer to:

- Louis G. Destremps (1851–1930), Canadian-born American architect
- Louis E. Destremps (1875–?), Canadian-born American architect
