= Notre Dame School (Fall River, Massachusetts) =

- U.S. National Register of Historic Places
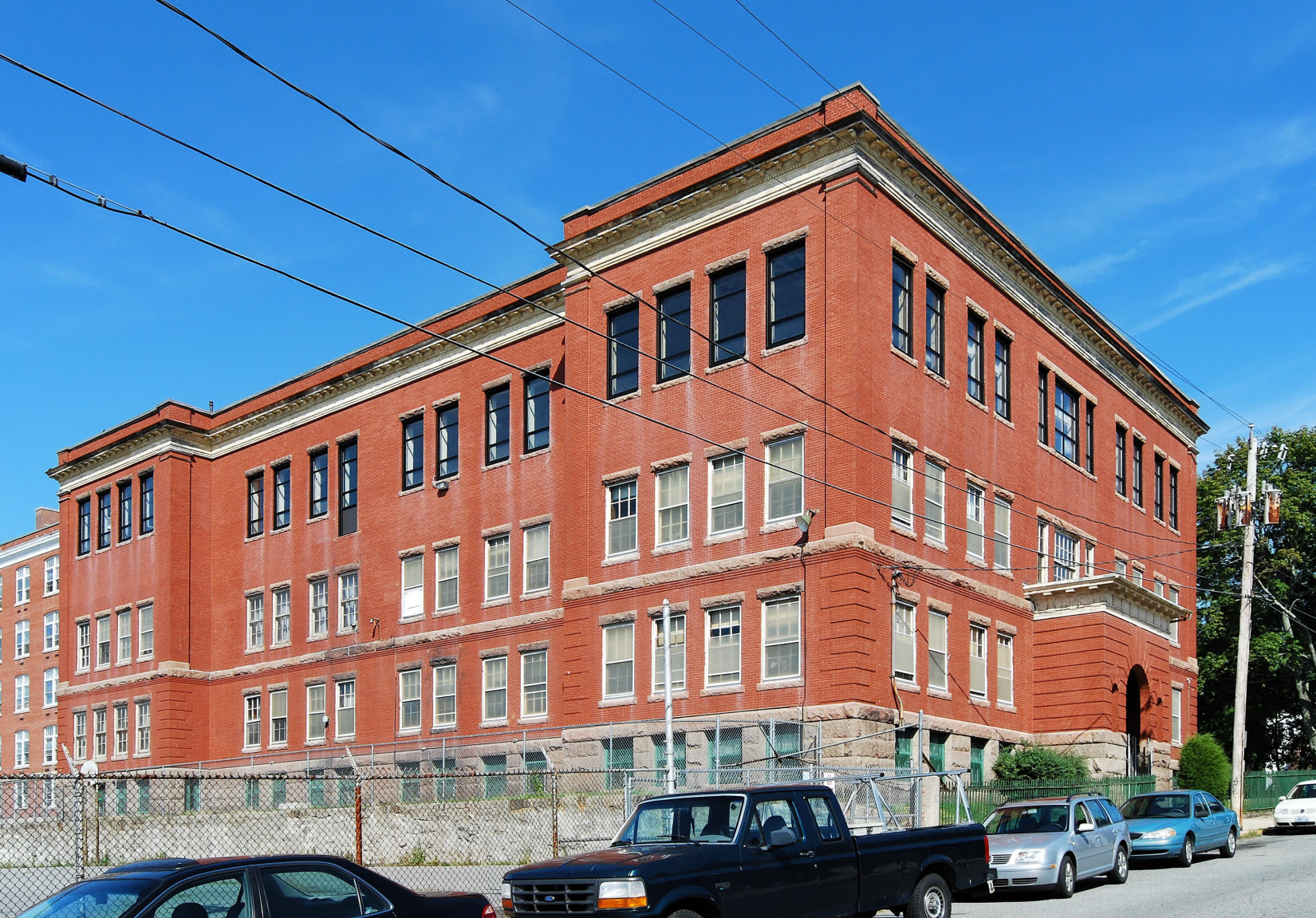

- Location within Massachusetts Location within the United States
- Location: Fall River, Massachusetts
- Coordinates: 41°41′28″N 71°8′2″W
- Built: 1899
- Architect: Louis G. Destremps
- Architectural style: Colonial Revival
- MPS: Fall River MRA
- NRHP reference No.: 83000697
- Added to NRHP: February 16, 1983

Notre Dame School is a historic former school building located at 34 St. Joseph's Street in Fall River, Massachusetts. Located in the Flint neighborhood, it was built in 1899, and designed by local architect and parish member Louis G. Destremps, who also designed the nearby St. Joseph's Orphanage and Notre Dame de Lourdes Church.

The large three story brick parochial school was built in the Colonial Revival style. Its full entablature is enhanced by small brackets and dentils. The central entrance is recessed with a covered entry supported by fluted Doric columns. The base is constructed from locally quarried Fall River granite The school opened in the fall of 1900 and was known at the time as Notre Dame College.

== History ==
Notre Dame School opened in 1876, with the final building opening in 1890.

The school was added to the National Register of Historic Places in 1983.

Its enrollment declined from 1,616 in 1920, its peak enrollment; to 432 in 2001; 149, or to 145 in 2008. The final graduating class had eight students. In addition to the enrollment decline, the overall percentage of Catholic people in Fall River declined, and the archdiocese deemed the facilities to be antiquated. The school closed on June 16, 2008. 109 of the remaining Notre Dame students were to attend the other Catholic schools in fall River, while 24 were to go to public schools and some others, as of June 2008, had not yet selected their next school.

Brian Dias, a parent of a student, made a brick memorial to the school with a cost of $3,700, giving it to the community for no cost. Bill Carpenter, a mason from Westport, put the bricks in place for no cost.

== See also ==
- National Register of Historic Places listings in Fall River, Massachusetts
- St. Joseph's Orphanage
- Jesus Marie Convent
- Notre Dame de Lourdes Church, Fall River Massachusetts
