= Fall River granite =

Precambrian bedrock in Massachusetts, United States

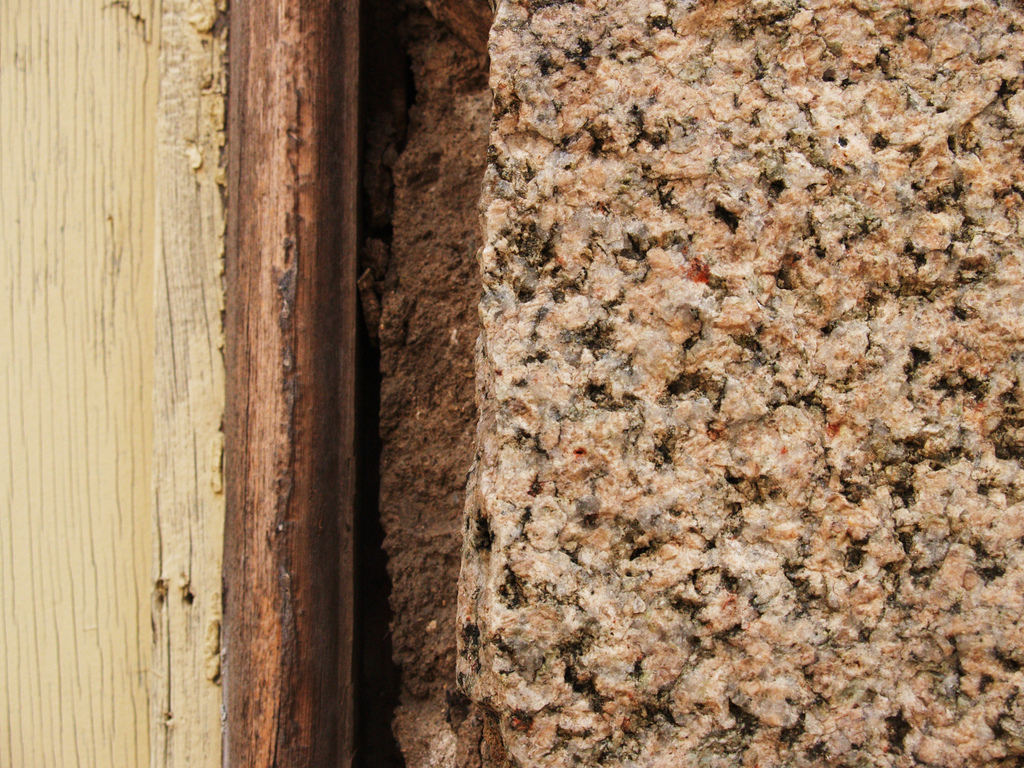
Detail of Fall River granite

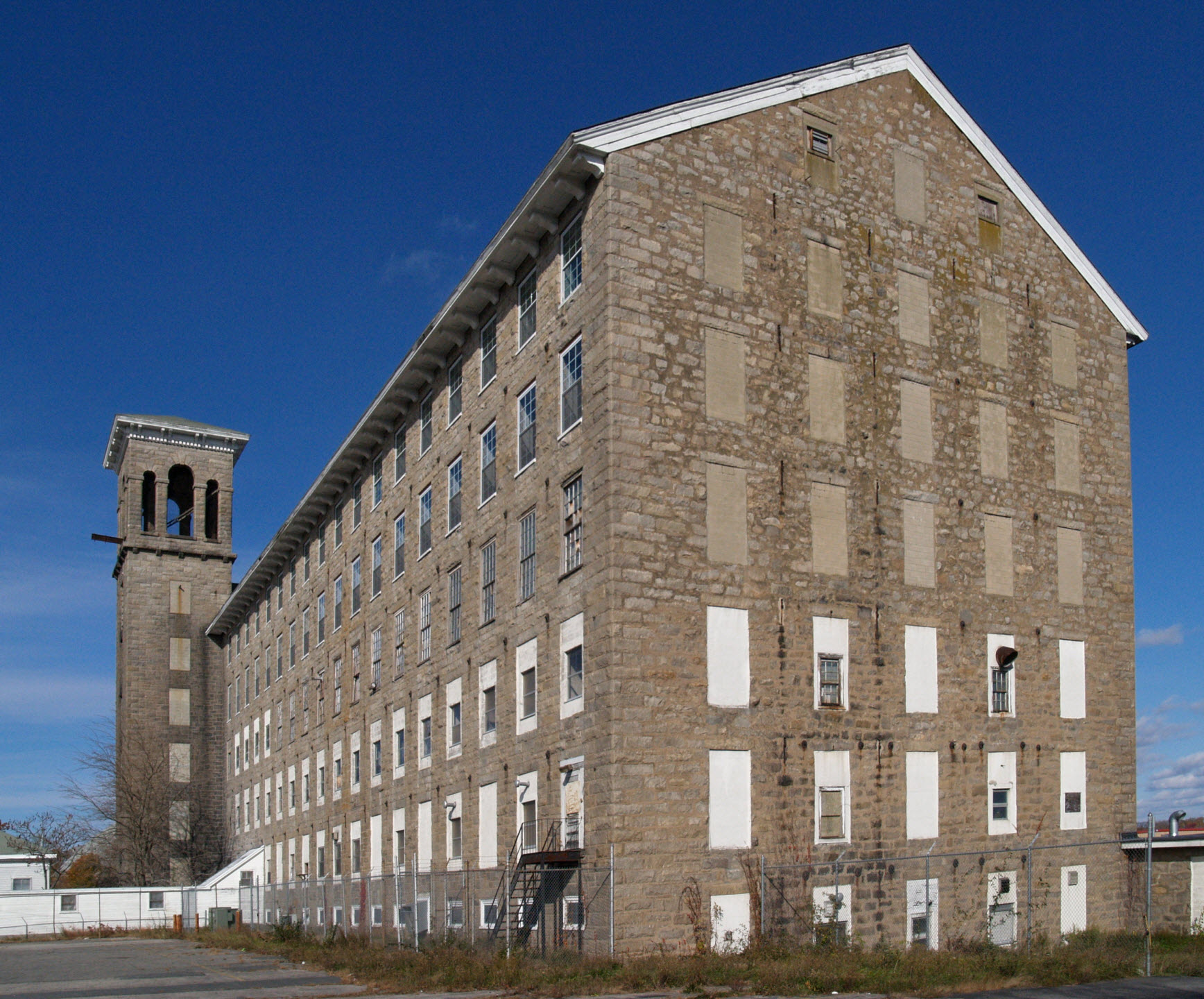
Chace Mills, built 1871 from native Fall River granite

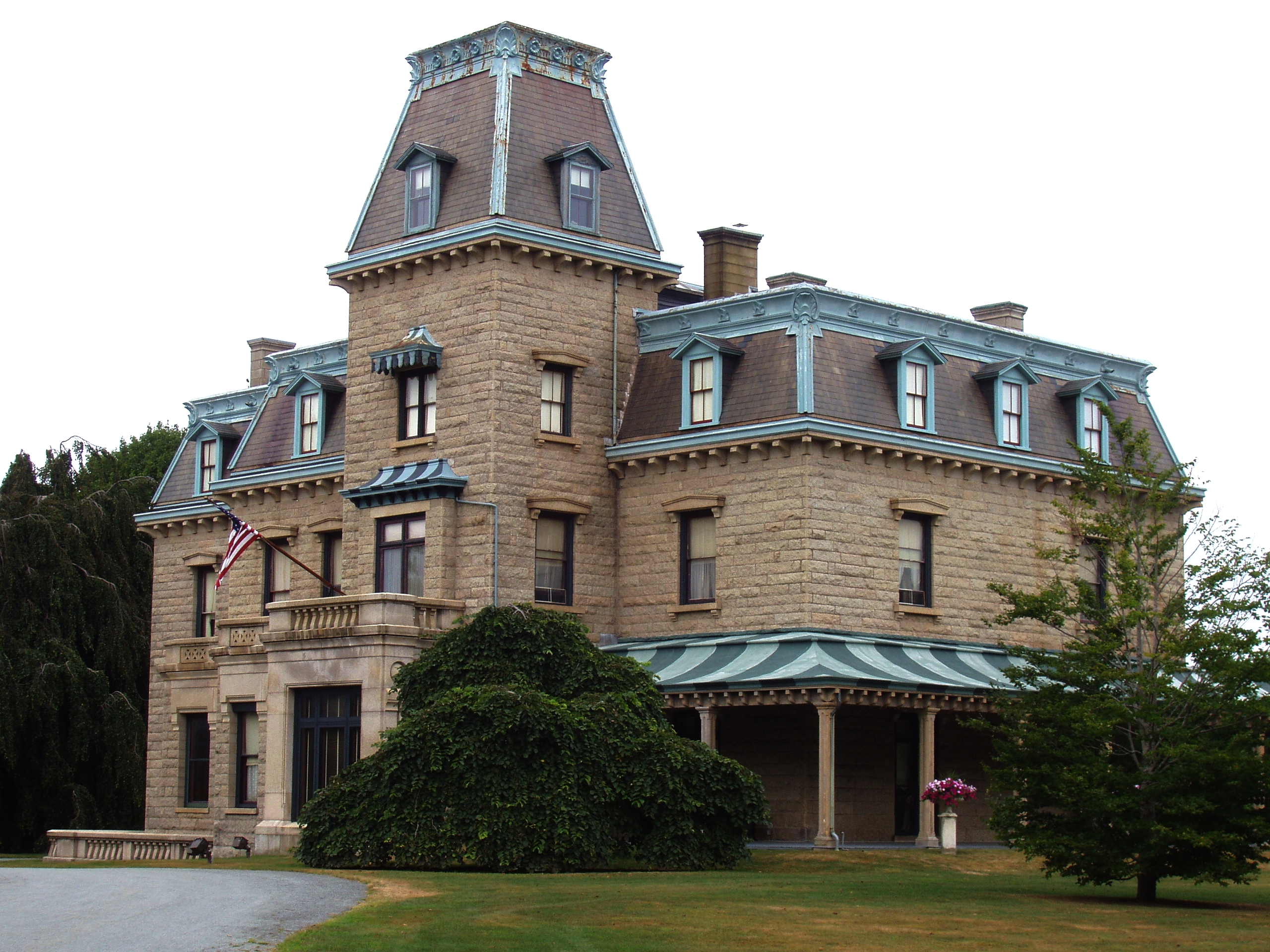
Chateau-sur-Mer, constructed from Fall River granite

Fall River granite is a Precambrian bedrock underlying the City of Fall River, Massachusetts and surrounding areas along the eastern shores of Narragansett Bay. It was formed 600 million years ago, as part of the Avalon terrane.

During the 19th century, the City of Fall River, Massachusetts became famous for the granite rock on which much of the city is built. The ridge extends approximately 20 miles (32 km) from the village of Assonet in the north through Fall River and into Tiverton, Rhode Island in the south, along the edge of the basin that forms Narragansett Bay. The eastern edge of the underlying granite is the Hixville Fault near Dartmouth, Massachusetts.

== Description ==
From a distance, the rock exhibits a distinctive tan-gray color. Viewed up close, it is more pink. The granite is very hard and durable, but cannot be polished very well. As a result, its appearance on a building is almost always somewhat rough, rather than the sharp lines of other types of building stone.

Edmund Hitchcock, of the 1841 Geological Survey of Massachusetts gave the following description of the granite:

But no rock can be finer for architectural purposes than the granite of Troy[Fall River]...The feldspar of this rock is a mixture of the flesh red and light green varieties; the former predominating: the quartz is light gray, and the mica, usually black... it works easily and has a lighter and more lively appearance than Quincy granite.

== Historical context ==
The granite quarry industry in Fall River had been established by 1840, employing 30 people, with the rock being transported to places such as Newport, New Bedford, Providence, Bristol, and New York City.

Several granite quarries operated in the area in the late 19th century, the largest of which was the Beattie Granite Quarry, located near what is now North Quarry Street, near the corner of Locust Street in Fall River. Originally called the Harrison Quarry, consisting of fewer than three acres, brothers William and John Beattie purchased the site near the end of the Civil War. After its abandonment in the late 1920s, the area began to filling with water from natural underground springs and aquifers. During the 1940s and 50s, the city used the pit as an open dump. In the mid 1960s, the area was reclaimed with the help of clean fill. It was acquired by the Fall River Housing Authority which built Oak Village in 1965, an apartment complex for the disabled and elderly. It may need to be razed. At least two of the buildings' floors have cracked, causing the walls to tilt. It has been attributed to settling of the stratified and poorly compacted layers of dirt-covered trash now filling the old quarry.

Another notable source of this granite was from the "Assonet Ledge" Quarry located in what now is Freetown-Fall River State Forest, located in Freetown, Massachusetts. The remains of the old railroad grade used to transport the stone from the quarry are still visible within the state forest.

== Examples of use ==
Many of the cotton textile mills in the city were built from this native stone, and it was highly regarded as a building material for many public buildings and private homes alike. Examples of the stones use within Fall River include St. Mary's Cathedral, The Fall River Historical Society Mansion and the base of St. Anne's Church. The first floor of the former B.M.C. Durfee High School building in Fall River is also constructed of native granite. Another fine example of the use of this material was the Notre Dame de Lourdes Church, Fall River Massachusetts. The entire lower portion of this structure below the roof and steeples was constructed of Fall River granite. Unfortunately this building was destroyed by fire on May 11, 1982.

The Chateau-sur-Mer mansion in Newport, Rhode Island is perhaps the best example of Fall River granite being used for private home construction.

== See also ==
- Fall River, Massachusetts
- Chateau-sur-Mer
- Israel Picard House
- Milford granite (Massachusetts)
