= L'Acadie, Quebec =

Coordinates: 45.3154°N 73.3451°W

L'Acadie (French pronunciation: [lakadi]) is a former municipality in the Montérégie region of Quebec, Canada, on the west side of the Richelieu River, across from Saint-Jean-sur-Richelieu, Quebec. It was about 30 miles (50 km) from Montreal, and about the same distance from the United States border at the head of Lake Champlain. In 2001, L'Acadie merged with neighbouring Saint-Jean-sur-Richelieu, along with several other neighbouring towns and villages.

The area was settled in the late 18th century by Acadians returning to Canada after the forced deportation in the mid-1700s. The town was eventually named after these Acadians.

L'Acadie is known by locals for having many century-old buildings and houses. The elementary school is named after Napoléon Bourassa, a sculptor, painter, and artist of the 19th century.

== Education ==
The South Shore Protestant Regional School Board previously served the municipality.
