= St. Anne Shrine of Fall River =

Historic church in Massachusetts, United States

- St. Anne Shrine
- U.S. National Register of Historic Places
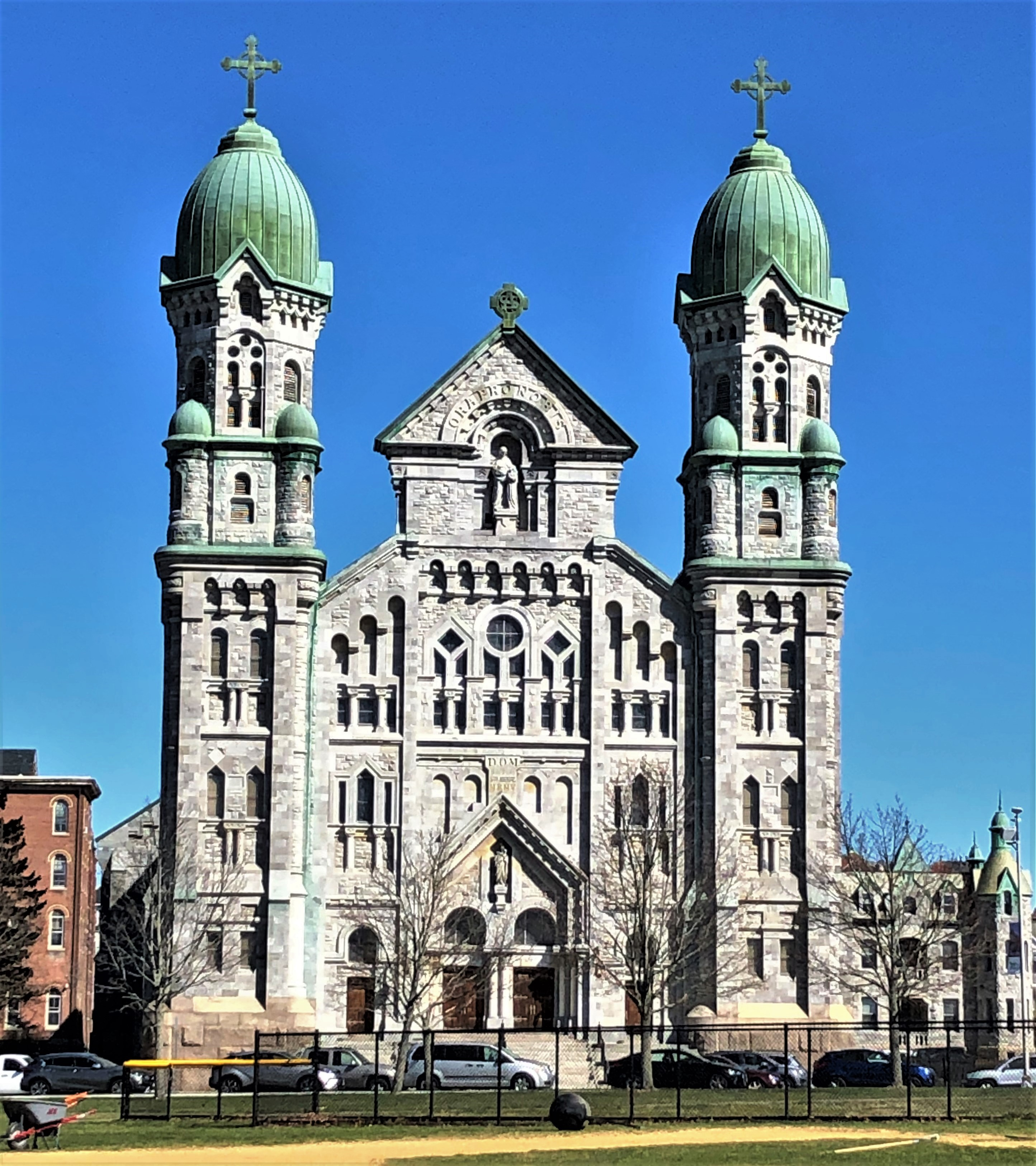
- (2021)

- Location within Massachusetts Location within the United States
- Location: Fall River, Massachusetts
- Coordinates: 41°41′38″N 71°9′50″W
- Built: 1891
- Architect: Napoléon Bourassa; Louis G. Destremps
- Architectural style: Romanesque
- MPS: Fall River MRA
- NRHP reference No.: 83000719
- Added to NRHP: February 16, 1983

St. Anne Shrine is a historic local landmark located at the intersection of South Main and Middle streets in Fall River, Massachusetts. Until 2018, it was a parish in the Roman Catholic Diocese of Fall River. In addition to the church, the complex also includes the former Dominican Order monastery, as well as the former Dominican Academy, which was constructed in 1894. The great upper church was formally dedicated on July 4, 1906 and closed November 25, 2018. The Lower Crypt Church shrine reopened on July 4, 2019, but the upper part of the church remains closed for restoration and renovation.

The church was designed by Canadian architect Napoléon Bourassa in the Romanesque Revival style. Construction began in 1891, and was supervised by Fall River architect Louis G. Destremps. Work began on the upper church on July 17, 1902. The building, which is constructed of blue marble from Proctor, Vermont, measures 277 feet long by 122 wide, with steeples 160 feet high. The exterior was completed in June 1904 and the new church was formally dedicated on July 4, 1906.

The complex was added to the National Register of Historic Places in 1983.

== Dominican Order influence ==
The parish and the shrine were under the direction of the Dominican Order from 1891 to 1978 when they reverted to the Diocese of Fall River. The Dominican fathers and brothers promoted the shrine as a place of pilgrimage and prayer. Most notable was the Very Reverend Vincent Marchildon, O.P., who served as the first official director of the shrine. Father Marchildon spent 60 years of his priestly ministry at Saint Anne, where he organized pilgrimages, novenas, and processions in honor of Good Saint Anne. Father Marchildon and two other Dominican founders are laid to rest in the lower church crypt.

== Healings ==
Since the earliest days of the parish, Saint Anne has been associated with unexplained "miraculous" healings. Monsignor Adrien de Montaubricq, the first pastor of Saint Anne's Parish, was injured when staging collapsed during the blessing of the cornerstone of the "old" Hope Street Church. He promised that if he survived his injuries, he would dedicate the parish to the protection of Good Saint Anne. He survived and kept his end of the bargain, and the parish was later dedicated to Saint Anne.

Since then, an annual Novena to Saint Anne was held to prepare the parish for her Feast Day on July 26.

When the "new" church was built and dedicated on South Main Street, the Dominican Friars envisioned that it would serve as a great shrine that would attract pilgrims from all over, much like the Shrine of Sainte-Anne-de-Beaupré in Quebec, Canada. By the mid-1920s, the shrine began to flourish and so an official director was named to overtake its daily operation. Pilgrims began to flock to the shrine from all over the region to hear sermons from various priests, attend novena and healing services, and venerate the first-class relics of Saint Anne.

During the healing services, pilgrims would come with canes, crutches, wheelchairs, and other maladies seeking the intercession of Good Saint Anne. They would be prayed over by Father Marchildon and anointed with the oil of Saint Anne. He often would then instruct the "ill pilgrims" to offer a nine-day novena to Saint Anne every day at the same time and that on the ninth day, their malady would be healed. Many of the individuals would return to the shrine as instructed this time "healed" and would leave their crutches, canes, and wheelchairs as a token of thanksgiving to Saint Anne. They are still on display at the shrine for pilgrims to bear witness to the healing power of Saint Anne.

While these "healings" where never officially investigated or approved by the Catholic Church. The Dominican Friars, who ran the shrine for over 90 years, felt that it was very important to document such healings. The documents are now housed in the Archives of the Dominican Order in Montreal, Canada.

== Closure ==
The main upper church was closed in May 2015, when a large piece of plaster fell off a wall during Mass. Subsequently, weekend Masses were held in the lower crypt church shrine. On October 15, 2018, Bishop Edgar da Cunha announced that St. Anne's would close as a parish church on the Feast of Christ the King that year, on November 25.

== Reopening of shrine and restoration of main church ==
The Saint Anne's Shrine Preservation Society, a registered non-profit charitable organization, through negotiations with the Diocese of Fall River, signed a ten-year lease for the property on July 1, 2019. The society `actively raises funds, independently of the Diocese, to stabilize the building repair damage from years of neglect; and, over the course of the lease, restore the building as a shrine and location for devotions and study. The lower church shrine reopened July 4, 2019, but the main church remains heavily damaged and is closed during restoration efforts.

On July 26, 2019, hundreds of people attended the Feast of Saint Anne, celebrated by Bishop Edgar daCunha, ordinary of the diocese, in the church's lower shrine in its first Mass since the closure. The Preservation Society is actively working to open the upper part of the church by 2029.

The lower shrine is the largest Catholic indoor votive candle shrine in Southern New England. There is the capacity to hold over 3,000 wax votive candles that are strategically placed around the various side chapels and oratories.

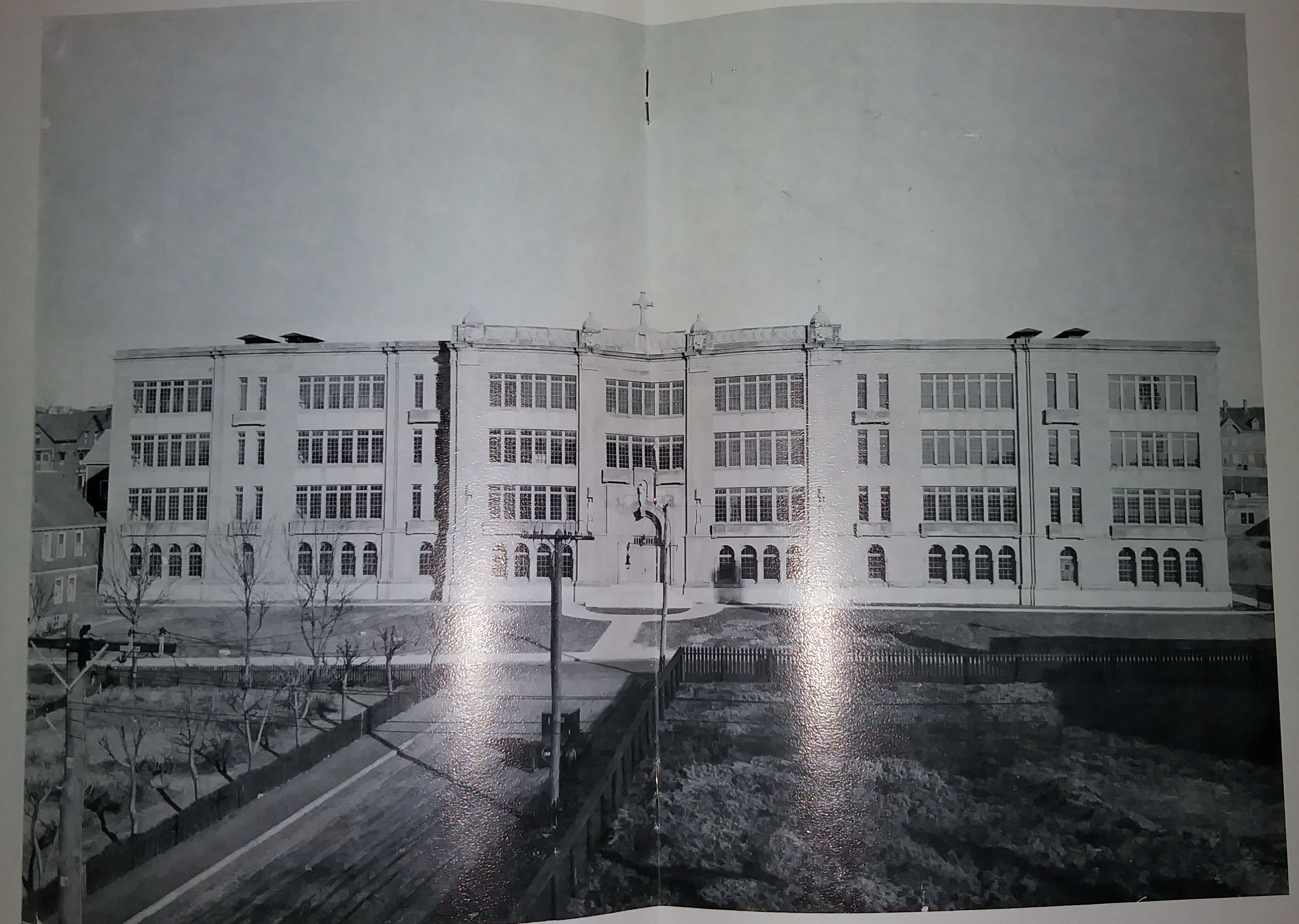
The former St. Anne's School building

== School ==
A school opened in the 1880s, with the first classes in the church basement. Its enrollment was 1,559 when the church opened the new school building in 1925. By 2007, it was the largest Catholic elementary school in Fall River.

In 2001, there were 432 students. At one point in the 2000s, the school put in a chapel on the first floor. The school spent $500,000 on windows installed in 2001. Renovations to the cafeteria and the gymnasium and a new playground were put into place as part of 2005-2006 renovations.

The school closed at the conclusion of the 2006–2007 school year, with 206 students, including 22 students in the graduating class. Of the non-graduating students, about 20 were to transfer to Fall River's other Catholic schools.

The school building has since been demolished, and a medical building has replaced it under Steward Health Care.

== Organs ==
Casavant Organ, Opus 2793 The upper church is home to a three-manual Casavant Freres organ, Opus 2793 (1964). It has 3 manuals/pedal, 84 ranks, and 4,518 pipes ranging in length from 7 inches to over 32 feet. The organ was dedicated on October 12, 1964 by the blind French organist and composer Jean Langlais. The instrument was featured in the 2005 convention of the Organ Historical Society.

Aeolian-Skinner Organ Co., Opus 1133, 1947 The lower church is home to a small two-manual Aeolian-Skinner Organ, which has been out of use since early 2000s. The organ may one day be restored during restoration efforts.

Allen Organ Co. Protégé Series The current instrument used for liturgies and celebrations in the lower church is an Allen Protégé digital organ. The two-manual instrument provides worthy sound quality to support worship in the shrine.

== See also ==
- National Register of Historic Places listings in Fall River, Massachusetts
- Notre Dame de Lourdes Church (Fall River, Massachusetts)
