= Union Street Railway Carbarn, Repair Shop =

- U.S. National Register of Historic Places
- U.S. Historic district – Contributing property
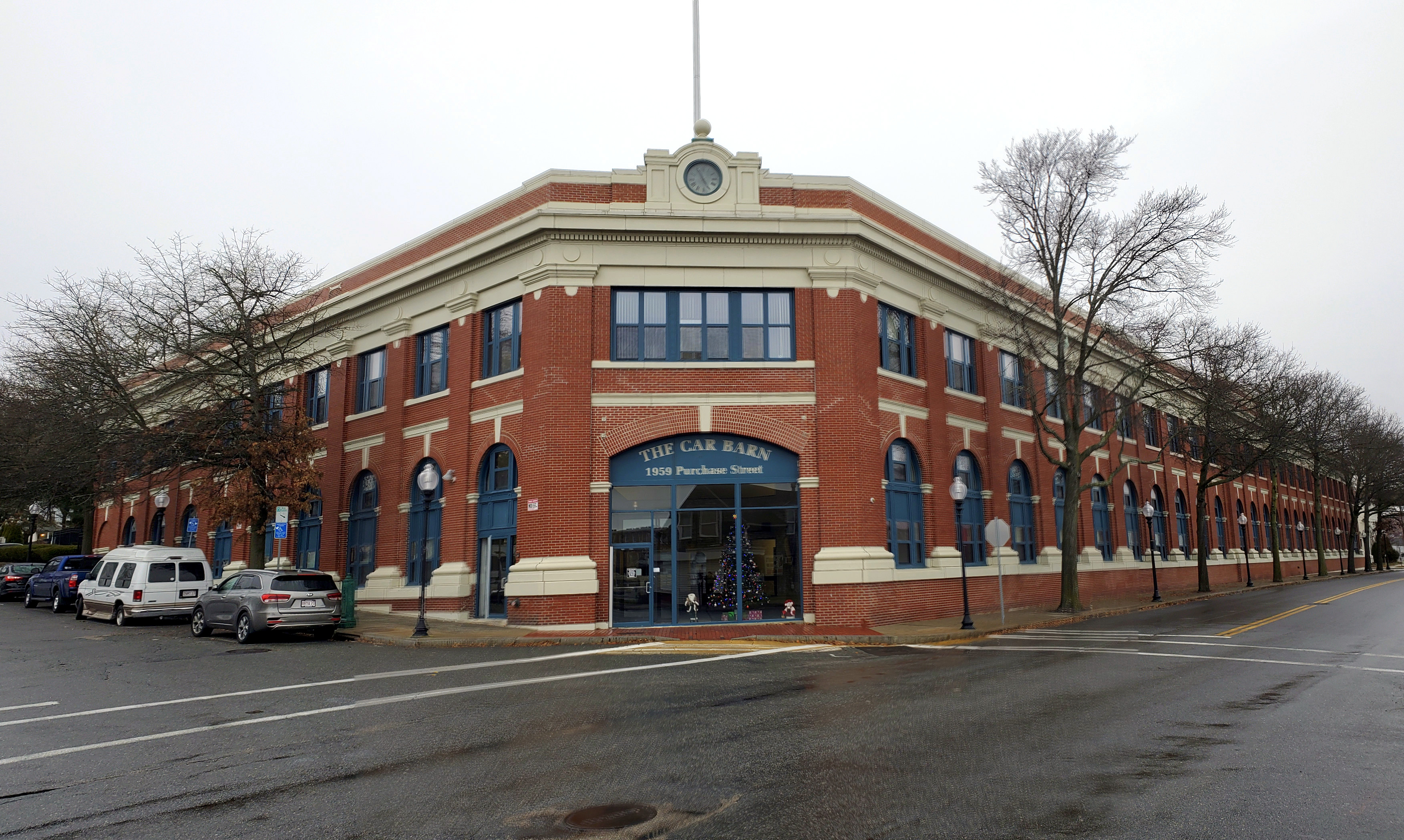
- Union Street Railway Carbarn in 2023

- Location within Massachusetts Location within the United States
- Location: New Bedford, Massachusetts
- Coordinates: 41°39′7″N 70°55′52″W
- Built: 1897
- Architect: Louis E. Destremps
- Part of: Acushnet Heights Historic District (ID89002035)
- NRHP reference No.: 78000431

Significant dates
- Added to NRHP: October 2, 1978
- Designated CP: December 1, 1989

The Union Street Railway Carbarn, Repair Shop is a historic transit maintenance facility of the Union Street Railway Company at 1959 Purchase Street in New Bedford, Massachusetts. Built in 1910, the carbarn was the center of the New Bedford's streetcar network, which operated from 1872 to 1947. The carbarn is a large single-story brick building, occupying nearly half of a city block. The adjacent repair shop building, a single-story brick-and-wood building, was built in 1897; it was demolished sometime between 1978 and 2003.

The property was listed on the National Register of Historic Places in 1978.

== See also ==
- National Register of Historic Places listings in New Bedford, Massachusetts
