= St. Joseph's Orphanage (Fall River, Massachusetts) =

- U.S. National Register of Historic Places
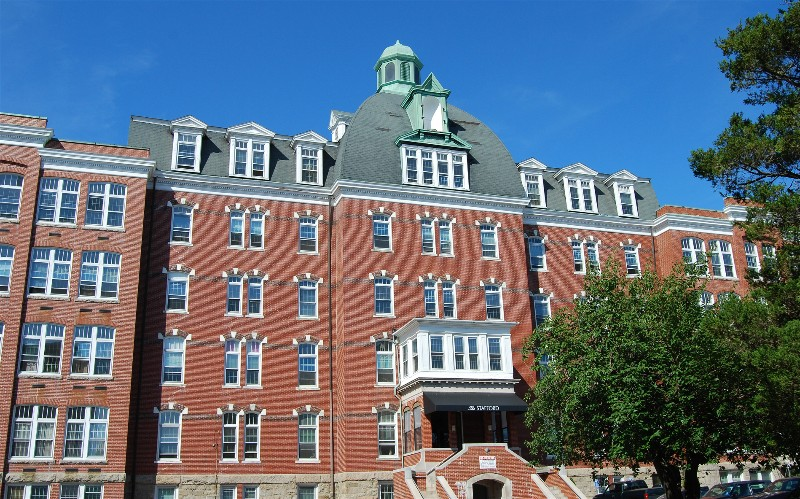

- Location within Massachusetts Location within the United States
- Location: Fall River, Massachusetts
- Coordinates: 41°41′30″N 71°8′0″W
- Built: 1892, 1917
- Architect: Destremps, Louis G.
- Architectural style: Second Empire
- MPS: Fall River MRA
- NRHP reference No.: 83000721
- Added to NRHP: February 16, 1983

St. Joseph's Orphanage is an historic former orphanage and school located at 56 St. Joseph Street in Fall River, Massachusetts.

The orphanage was built in 1892 as part of the parish of Notre Dame de Lourdes, a large French-Canadian congregation located in the city's Flint Village neighborhood. Two large wings were added about 1917. The building later housed an elementary school, known as Mount Saint Joseph. Between 1982 and 1986, the school's chapel was used as a temporary place of worship by Notre Dame after its magnificent 1895 church was destroyed by a massive fire on May 11, 1982.

The building was added to the National Register of Historic Places in 1983.

In 1989, the building was converted into residential apartments, with a large addition to the north side. A statue of Saint Joseph was removed from the alcove atop the front of the building and placed on the nearby grounds of Notre Dame Church.

== See also ==
- National Register of Historic Places listings in Fall River, Massachusetts
- Notre Dame School (Fall River, Massachusetts)
- Jesus Marie Convent
- Notre Dame de Lourdes Church, Fall River Massachusetts
