= Orpheum Theatre (New Bedford, Massachusetts) =

Theatre and movie house in New Bedford, Massachusetts, U.S.

- La Salle Francs Tireurs
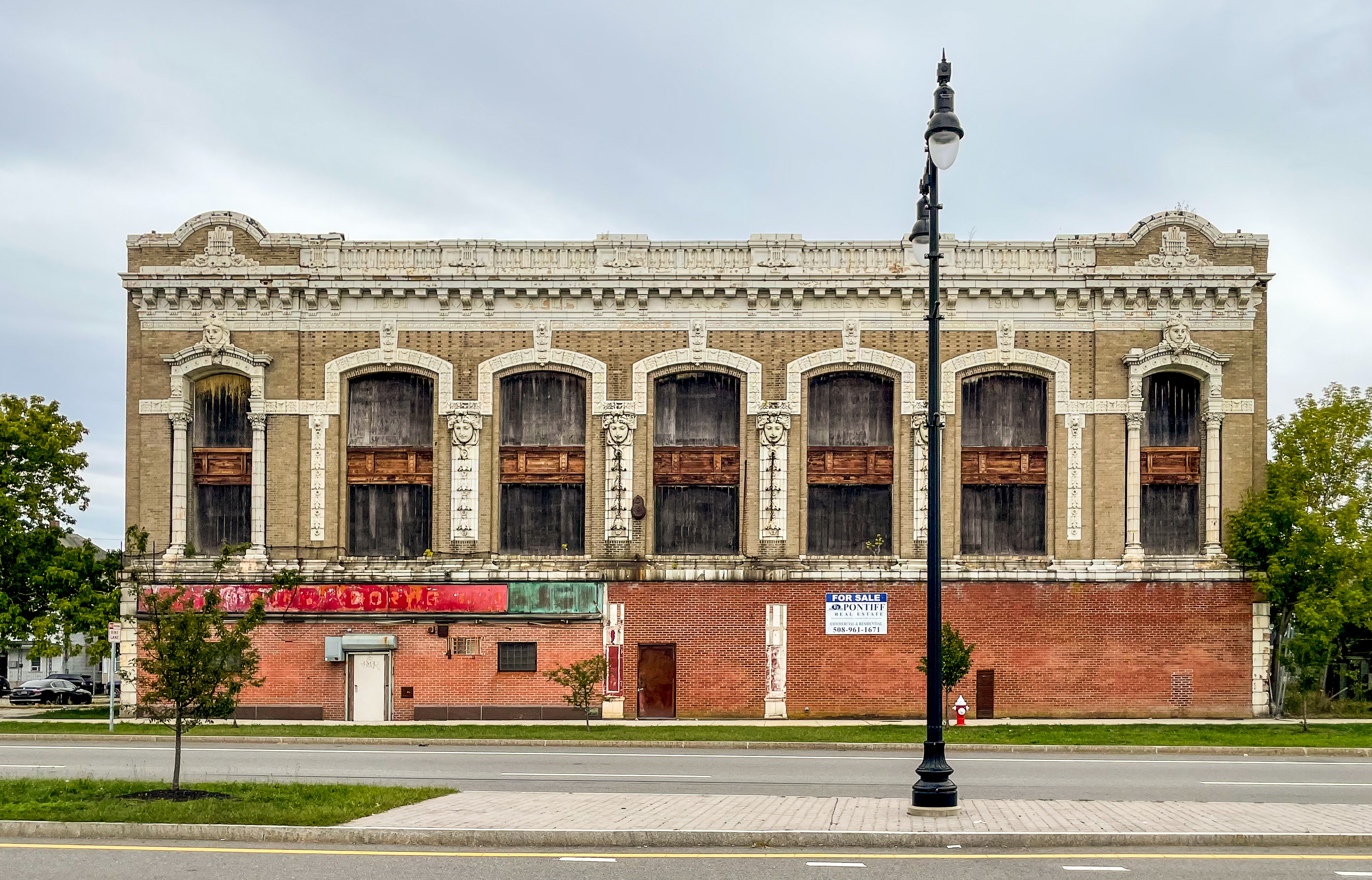
- Address: 1005 Water Street; New Bedford; United States
- Capacity: 1,500
- Type: Performing Arts Center
- Current use: Vacant

Construction
- Opened: 1912
- Years active: 1912-1962
- Architect: Louis E. Destremps

The Orpheum Theater is an old theatre and movie house located at 1005 Water Street in New Bedford, Massachusetts USA, originally named the Majestic Opera House.

== History ==
The building, designed by Louis E. Destremps, was constructed by the French Sharpshooter's Club of New Bedford to house both a ballroom and armed shooting range. It opened on April 15, 1912 (the same day the Titanic sank).

The Sharpshooters Club leased the theatre to the Orpheum Circuit of Boston, which brought a series of vaudeville and variety performers to New Bedford. By the 1920s the theatre showed motion pictures, as well.

This Orpheum theatre is believed to be the second oldest "Orpheum" in the nation (it was built a year after the Orpheum Theatre in Los Angeles).

When the theatre opened, it seated 1,500 people. The theatre closed in 1958–59, and was only opened for special events. The sharpshooters club sold it in 1962, and it was used as storage by a tobacco company. The back of the theatre currently houses a supermarket, but the rest of the space is still empty. The building is currently privately owned.

In 2004 a non-profit company, O.R.P.H. (Orpheum Rising Project Helpers) Inc, announced plans to bring back the theatre and revitalize New Bedford economy. However, the group was unable to raise the necessary funds, and the theater was placed for sale in 2012. The building was sold in 2017, then placed for sale again in 2019, and again in 2023.
