= Bark Street School =

- U.S. National Register of Historic Places
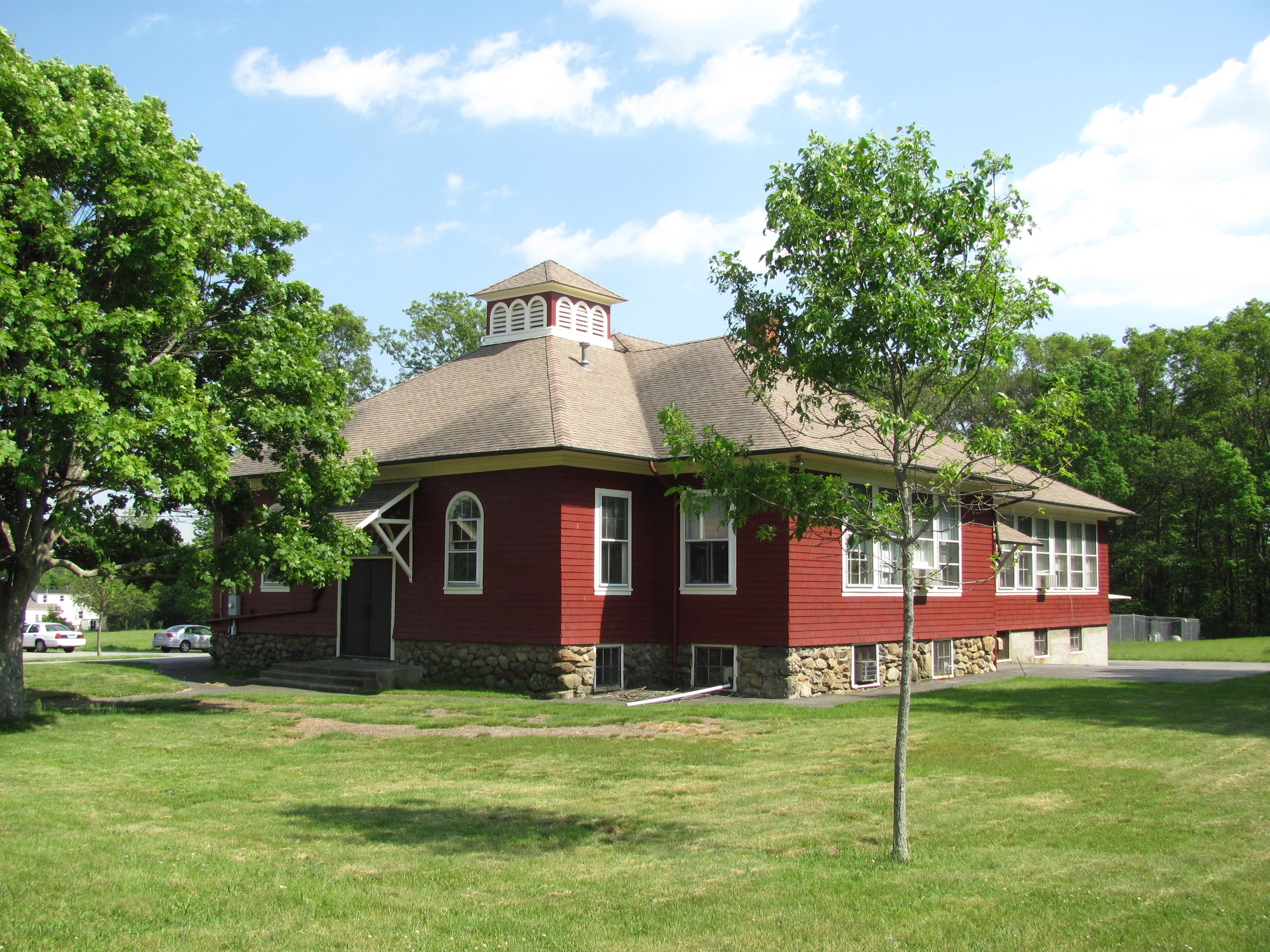
- Bark Street School

- Location within Massachusetts Location within the United States
- Location: Swansea, Massachusetts
- Coordinates: 41°44′58″N 71°9′50″W
- Area: less than one acre
- Built: 1905
- Architect: Destremps, Louis G. & Sons
- Architectural style: Colonial Revival
- MPS: Swansea MRA
- NRHP reference No.: 90000062
- Added to NRHP: February 16, 1990

The Bark Street School is a historic school building on Stevens Road at Bark Street in Swansea, Massachusetts. Built in 1905, it is the town's only surviving wood-frame school building. It was listed on the National Register of Historic Places in 1990.

== Description and history ==
The Bark Street School is located on the south side of Stevens Road, just west of Bark Street in eastern Swansea. It is a single-story wood-frame structure, set on a cobblestone foundation, and topped by a hip roof with a louvered square cupola at its center. Its roof has wide eaves and banded windows on the sides, reminiscent of the Prairie School of architecture. The walls are finished in wooden shingles. Its main entrance is set in a projecting vestibule section, with a shed-roof hood supported by large triangular knee brackets, and is topped by a round-arch transom window.

The building was designed by Louis G. Destremps & Son and built in 1905, replacing a single-room schoolhouse on the same site. Due to increasing enrollments (it was over its nominal capacity of 80 students by 1920), it was enlarged with a major expansion adding two classrooms c. 1930. The addition was done with sympathetic design and materials, differing only in the concrete foundation. Although it was one of ten schools in Swansea at the time, it is now the town's last wood-frame school building. It now serves as an annex to Swansea Town Hall.

== See also ==
- National Register of Historic Places listings in Bristol County, Massachusetts
