= Jesus Marie Convent (Fall River, Massachusetts) =

- Jesus Mary Convent
- U.S. National Register of Historic Places
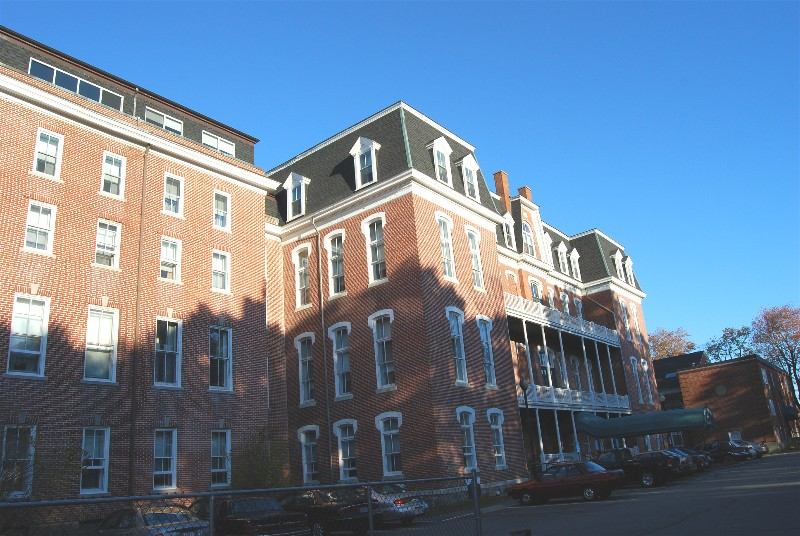

- Location within Massachusetts Location within the United States
- Location: Fall River, Massachusetts
- Coordinates: 41°41′27″N 71°7′56″W
- Built: 1887
- Architect: Louis G. Destremps
- Architectural style: Second Empire
- MPS: Fall River MRA
- NRHP reference No.: 83000685
- Added to NRHP: February 16, 1983

The Jesus Mary Convent is a historic former convent located at 138 St. Joseph's Street in Fall River, Massachusetts. It was built in 1887 and designed by local architect and parish member Louis G. Destremps, who also designed the nearby orphanage, school and church.

The four story Second Empire brick convent was built as part of Notre Dame Parish. The west facing central tower with its Italianate window lintels is blocked forward and dentils adorn the cornice line. A detached auditorium was added in 1939 to the north of the main structure. Until 1971, the building also housed Jesus Marie Academy, a private high school for girls. In the mid-1970s, the academy was renovated into a retirement center-infirmary for retired religious.

The building was added to the National Register of Historic Places in 1983. Shortly after, the property was converted into apartments, known as Lafayette Place. Several new buildings were added on the grounds to the west of the historic convent.

== See also ==
- National Register of Historic Places listings in Fall River, Massachusetts
- Notre Dame School (Fall River, Massachusetts)
- St. Joseph's Orphanage (Fall River, Massachusetts)
