= Louis G. Destremps =

American architect

Louis Gonzague Destremps
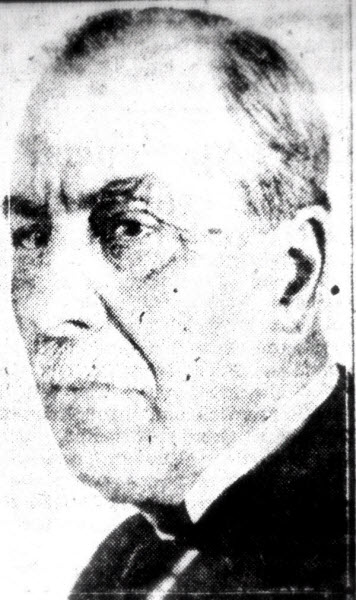
- Born: May 9, 1851; Montreal, Quebec, Canada
- Died: February 27, 1930; Fall River, Massachusetts, U.S.
- Known for: Architect

Louis G. Destremps (1851–1930) was a Canadian-born American architect who worked extensively with the Roman Catholic Church and other clients in Fall River, Massachusetts. He is the father of Louis E. Destremps, who also designed notable buildings in the New Bedford, Massachusetts area.

== Early life and architectural training ==
Destremps was born in St. Cuthbert, Berthier county, Province of Quebec, Canada May 9, 1851. He received his early educational training in his native town finishing in 1866 and for two years studied at the Trade School of the City of Montreal. In 1868, he came to the United States and worked for about seven years as a cabinet maker, returning in 1875 to Montreal, where he was employed in the engineering construction department of the grand Trunk Railroad between Montreal and Quebec City. In 1880, he went to New York City to study architecture at Sixth Avenue High School, from which he graduated, completing the 4-year course.

In 1874, Destremps married Celina Mary Millet of Fall River. Together they had six children, including Louis E. Destremps who would later follow his father's profession and establish his own practice in the New Bedford area.

== Architectural practice ==
In 1885, Destremps moved to Fall River and set up his architectural firm. Between 1888 and 1889, he relocated temporarily to Newport, Rhode Island, where he was architect for the State Agricultural College at Kingston, Rhode Island. In later years he would design many notable structures in Fall River.

Destremps was frequently employed as supervising architect for the work of other architects, including Napoléon Bourassa and Joseph Venne. His own masterpiece, Notre Dame De Lourdes Church in Fall River, Massachusetts was destroyed in a 4-alarm fire in 1982. The event was reported in the news media throughout New England.

== Works include ==
- St. Mathieu's Church, Fall River Massachusetts (demolished)
- St. Mathieu's rectory and school Fall River, Massachusetts
- Jesus of Mary Convent, 1887, Fall River, Massachusetts (converted to apartments)
- Convent for Dominican Sisters, Fall River, Massachusetts
- St. Joseph's Orphanage, 1892, Fall River, Massachusetts (converted to apartments)
- Fall River armory, 1896, Fall River, Massachusetts supervising architect for Wait & Cutter
- St. Anthony of Padua Church, 1896, New Bedford, Massachusetts supervising architect for Joseph Venne
- Notre Dame School, 1899, Fall River, Massachusetts
- Brick Apartment House, 1901, Fitchburg, Massachusetts
- Bark Street School, 1905, Swansea, Massachusetts
- Notre Dame de Lourdes Church, 1906, Fall River, Massachusetts (destroyed by fire in 1982)
- St. Anne's Church, 1906, Fall River, Massachusetts supervising architect for Napoléon Bourassa
- District Courthouse, 1908, Fall River, Massachusetts

== Gallery ==
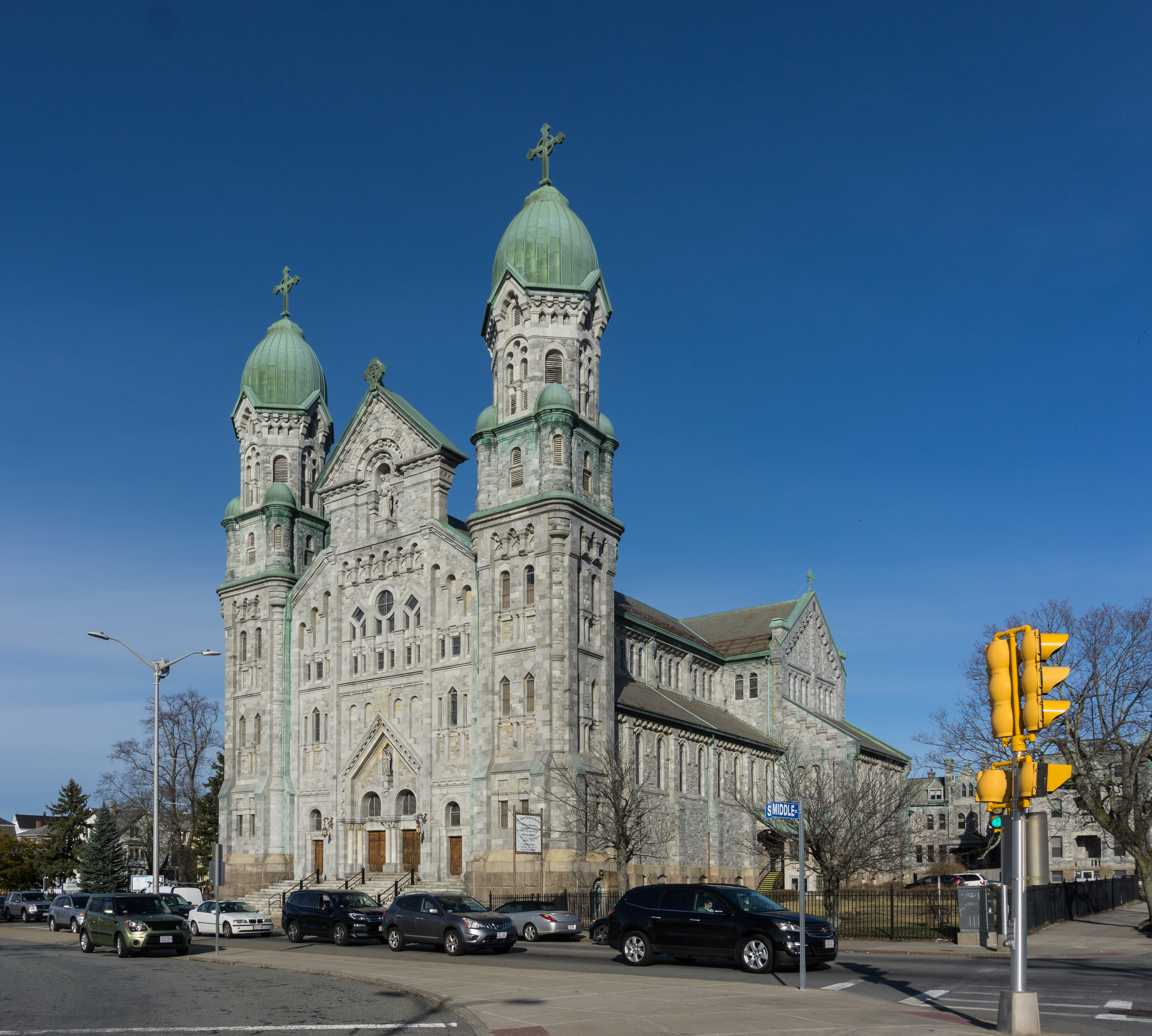
St. Anne's Church, Fall River

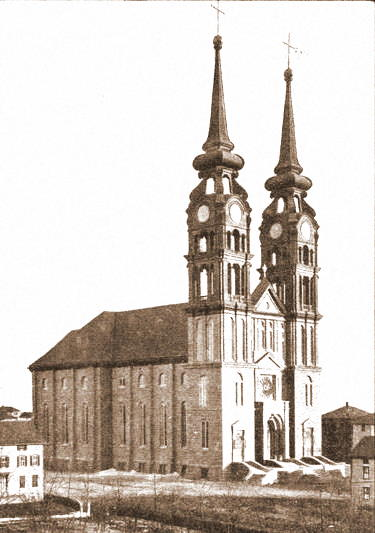
Former Notre Dame de Lourdes Church (1906–1982)

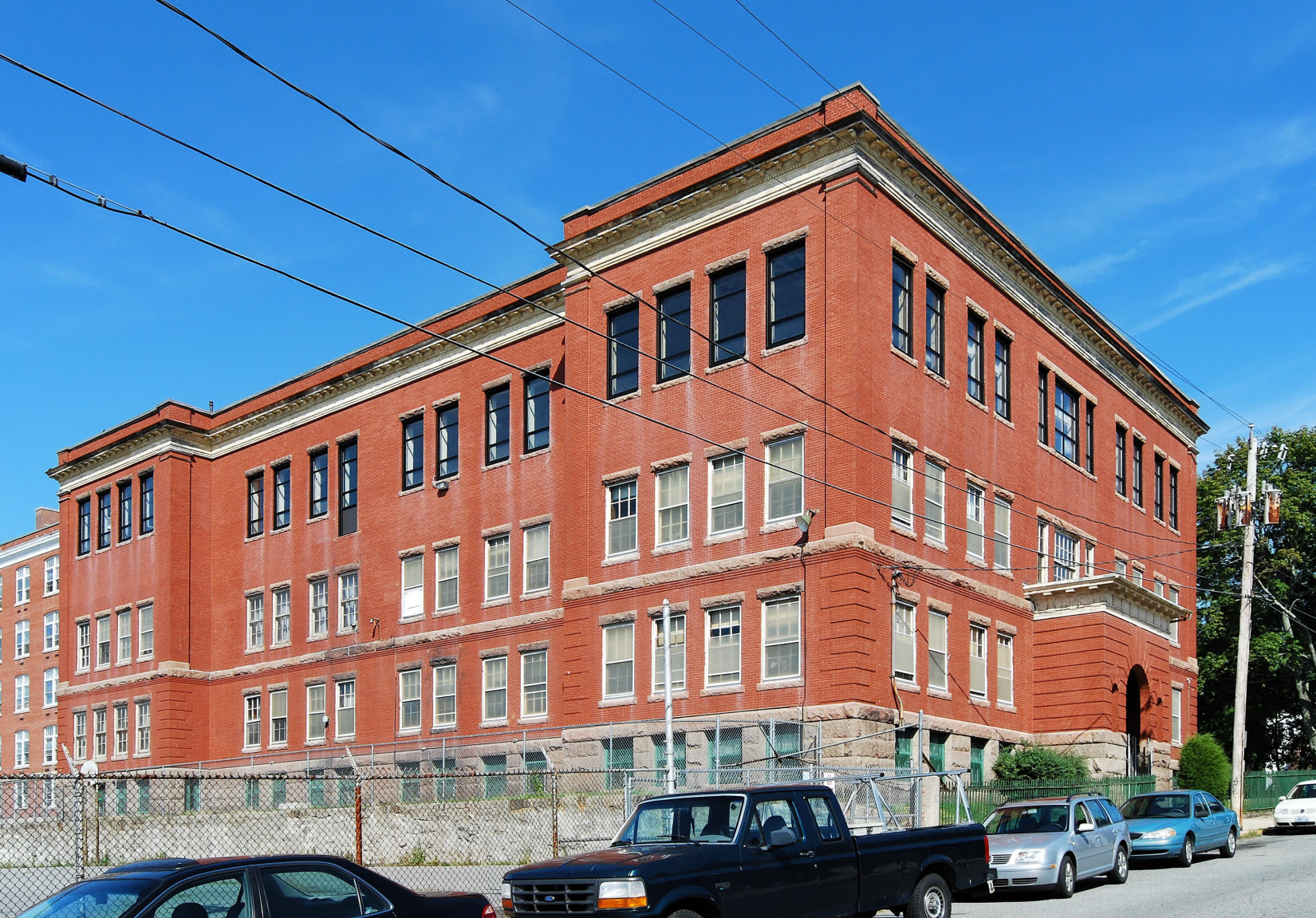
Notre Dame School, Fall River
