= Israel Picard House =

Historic house in Massachusetts, United States

- U.S. National Register of Historic Places
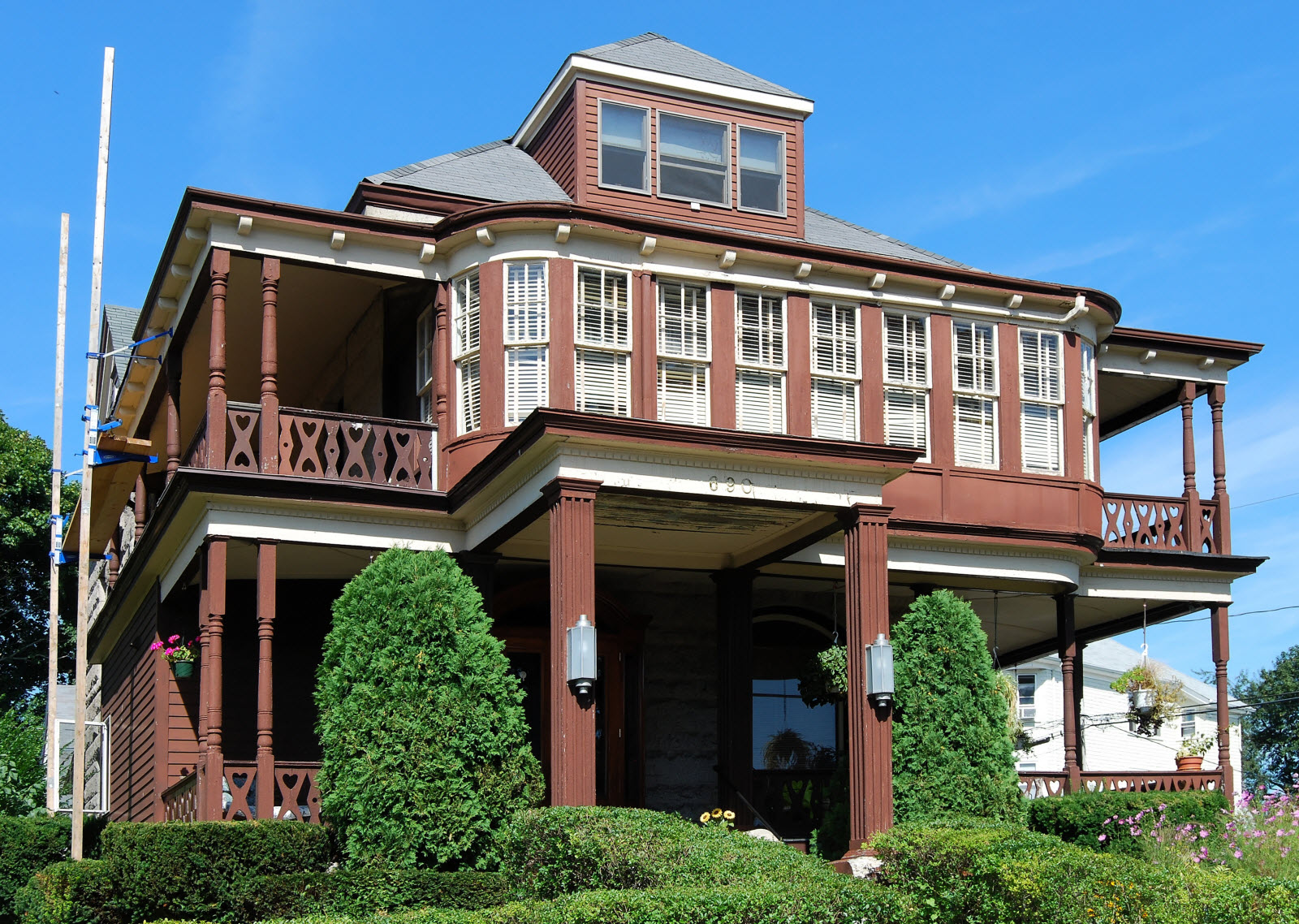

- Location within Massachusetts
- Location: 690 County St., Fall River, Massachusetts
- Coordinates: 41°42′6″N 71°7′46″W
- Built: 1897
- Architectural style: Queen Anne
- MPS: Fall River MRA
- NRHP reference No.: 83000702
- Added to NRHP: February 16, 1983

The Israel Picard House is a historic house located at 690 County Street in Fall River, Massachusetts.

== Description and history ==
It is a two-story structure, built out of pink Fall River granite, which is partly obscured by the elaborate wooden Queen Anne porch that wraps around the front and parts of the sides. The house was built in 1897 for Israel Picard, owner of the quarry which provided the stone, and it may have served in part as an advertisement for his products.

The house was listed on the National Register of Historic Places on February 16, 1983.

== See also ==
- National Register of Historic Places listings in Fall River, Massachusetts
