= Notre Dame de Lourdes Church (Fall River, Massachusetts) =

Former Catholic parish in Massachusetts

Coordinates: 41.6901°N 71.1318°W

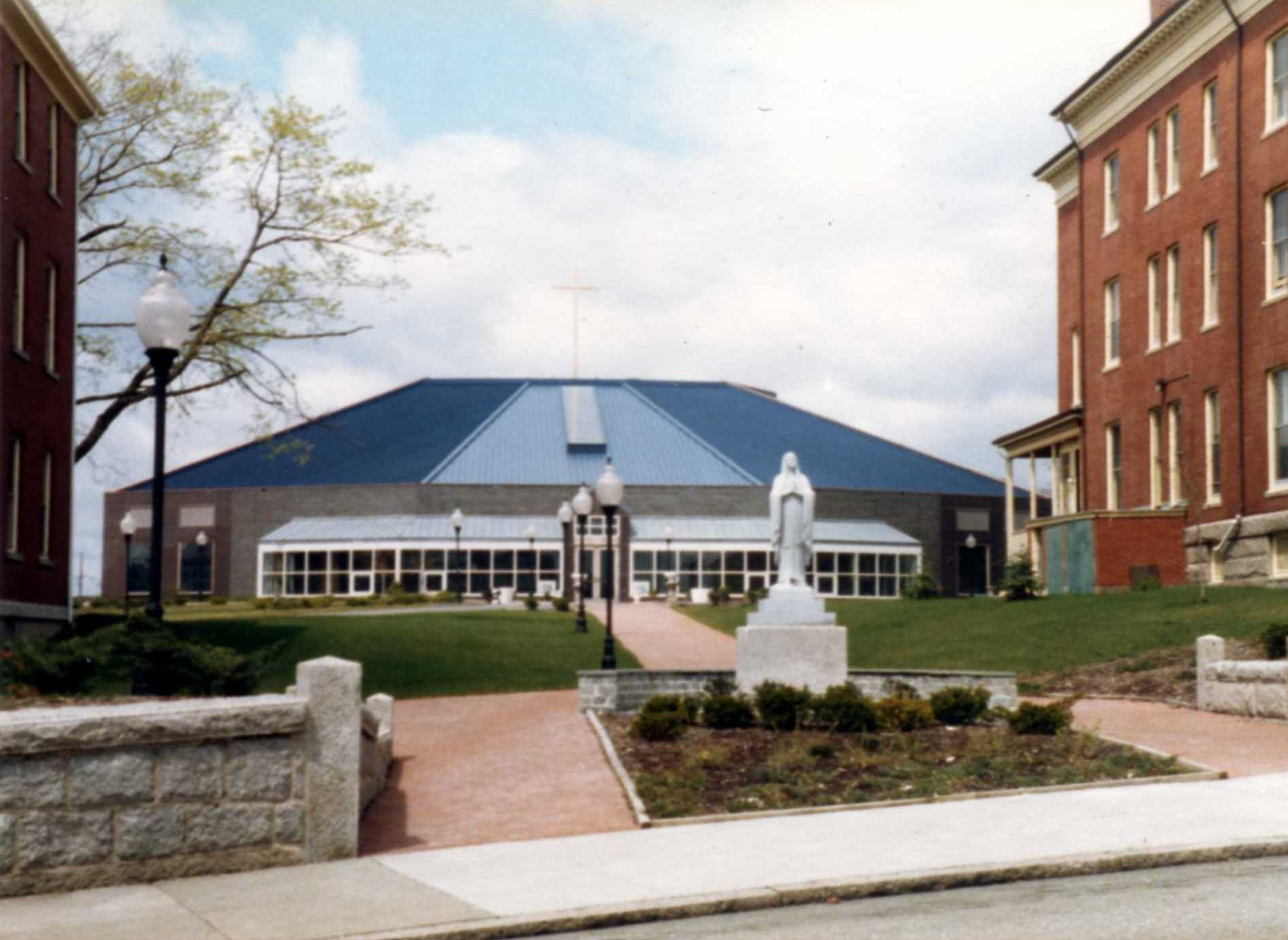
Former Notre Dame de Lourdes Church, known as Saint Bernadette Parish from 2012 to 2018

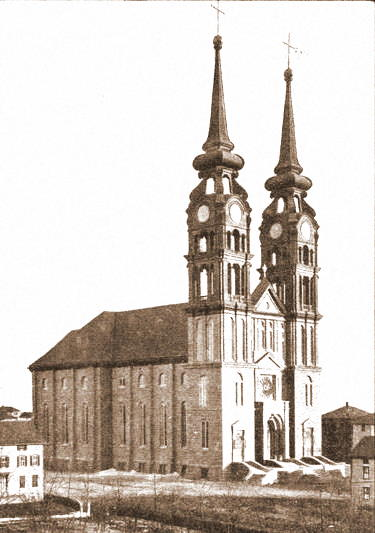
Notre Dame de Lourdes Church (1906–1982)

Notre Dame de Lourdes, known from 2012 to 2018 as St. Bernadette Parish, is a former Roman Catholic parish in Fall River, Massachusetts. A part of the Roman Catholic Diocese of Fall River, the parish was established in 1874 to serve the growing French-Canadian population located in the city's Flint Village section. Since its founding, the parish has occupied three different church buildings; a wooden structure (1874–1893), a spectacular granite church (1906–1982) and the current modern church (1986–2018). The parish complex over time has also consisted of other multiple buildings, including St. Joseph's Orphanage, The Jesus Marie Convent, Notre Dame School, the church rectory, the Brothers' residence, and the former Msgr. Prevost High School. The parish also includes Notre Dame Cemetery, located in the city's south end.

In March 2012, the diocese announced that Notre Dame de Lourdes Parish would be merging with nearby Immaculate Conception Parish, with the new combined parish renamed Saint Bernadette Parish. This name gives a connection to both parishes as it was Saint Bernadette who was reported to have witnessed the apparition of the Immaculate Conception (the Virgin Mary) at Lourdes, France.

== History ==
Notre Dame de Lourdes Parish was created in July 1874, and named after the 1858 apparitions of the Blessed Virgin Mary at Lourdes, France. The first pastor of the parish was Rev. Pierre Jean-Baptiste Bedard, from Montreal. The new parish included about 250 French-Canadian families and about 40 Irish families, who settled to work in the newly established cotton mills located in the east end of Fall River. The church has been through three buildings in its 144-year history.

== First church: 1874-1893 ==
Notre Dame de Lourdes Parish's first church was a wooden structure located where St. Joseph's Orphanage is now. The building was erected in just six weeks in the summer of 1874, and measured 45 feet wide by 110 feet long. The parish would remain mixed until 1882, when Immaculate Conception Parish was established nearby for the growing Irish population.

By 1888, however, the wooden church was badly dilapidated and no longer fit for use by the large parish, which had grown to 900 families. In 1890, parishioner and noted architect Louis G. Destremps was asked by Father Prevost to design a new church. The first church was destroyed by fire on November 12, 1893. Masses were then held in a temporary tent until the new church could be used.

== Second church: 1891-1982 ==
On May 30, 1891, the cornerstone was laid on what was to be one of the largest and most beautiful churches in New England. In December 1894, the lower church was completed and ready for use, much to the relief of the parish whose wooden church burnt a year earlier. For the new church, Destremps designed "A system of trusses, beams, buttresses and metal rods with turnbuckles" to channel the weight of the roof directly down through the granite walls and leave an unobstructed view of the interior of the church. M.J. Castagnoli, a master sculptor, was commissioned to do the plaster work on the columns, cornices, and bas-reliefs that decorated the church. The master artist, Ludovic Cremonini, created 18 majestic oil paintings which adorned the walls and ceilings, including his interpretation of Rapheal's "Last Judgement", which was one of the largest paintings in the northeast. In 1906, the giant pipe organ manufactured by the Brothers Casavant of St. Hyacinthe was installed, and on November 29 of that year the church was officially dedicated.

At 310 feet, the twin steeples were the second tallest in the United States at the time of their construction. The building of the church cost a total of $315,000.00. The church building was meant to evoke the Notre Dame de Paris.

In 1920, the Sacred Heart Monument was erected on the grounds near the front of the church. It was dedicated to 22 men from the parish who lost their lives fighting in World War I. Only 21 names appear on the monument, as the 22nd man had enlisted with the Canadian Army. Lucien Hippolyte Gosselin of Manchester, New Hampshire, was chosen as the sculptor of the bronze statues. The bronze work, done in Paris, consisted of the Sacred Heart statue, an angel cradling a soldier, and three plaques: one for the Army, one for the Navy and the last with the names of the men. The granite base was carved by Honore Savoie of Fall River. The parishioners raised $26,373 to pay for the monument. It is one of two war memorials in the city of Fall River that are not on public land. The other is a bronze plaque on the granite steps of St. Patrick's Church (Good Shepherd Parish).

In 1924, the Carillon bells were installed in south steeple.

On February 11, 1934, the Lourdes Grotto was dedicated in the lower church.

In 1938, a hurricane badly shook the steeples and created a danger of them falling. An original plan was to lower them from 310 feet to 160 feet and cut them off just above the belfries. The plan was scrapped and the tall pinnacles were reduced to 235 feet instead; everything above a four-way arch above the clocks was removed and replaced with a shorter, simpler cap with smaller crosses at the top. The simpler octagonal caps were tapered at roughly the same angle as the architecture of the arches and mesh well with them.

The church underwent several more changes over the years until the final restoration in 1982. The restoration was in part for muc- needed repairs on the building and also to prepare the church to be placed on the National Register of Historic Places. Unfortunately this never came to be though St. Joseph's Orphanage, the JMA and Notre Dame School made it on the register.

== Fire on May 11, 1982 ==
In 1982, the church began a $1 million renovation project. During the restoration, a workman's blowtorch accidentally ignited the building, the roof timbers were affected, starting a fire in the south steeple. The dry wood caught quickly and the fire spread in minutes. The attic first caught fire. Carpenters ran to get the Sexton and raced up the stairs of the tower to try to put out the fire. Running into a wall of thick black smoke, they could do nothing. It became a race against time to get records, the Eucharist, and anything else of value out of the church before the building was engulfed. The fire department responded quickly, but its efforts were hampered by strong winds, intense heat from the fire, and the hydrants low water pressure. The fire, fanned by the high wind, spread to nearby buildings and soon engulfed homes and businesses on the next two streets. When the fire finally came under control, many buildings were gone. The church was a total loss, and the empty granite shell is a ruin.

A similar incident occurred in 2006 during the restoration of Troitsky Cathedral in St. Petersburg, Russia. An accident during its restoration caused a fire in which the main dome and a smaller dome burned. Fortunately, the main church was saved, and the domes were rebuilt. Media outlets compared the fire to the 2019 Notre Dame fire, in Paris.

== Third church: 1986–2018 ==
With the loss of the church, Masses were moved to St. Joseph's Orphanage until a new church could be built. Saturday and Sunday Masses were held at Bishop Connolly High School. When the ruins were searched very little was found to remain from the fire. One stained-glass window, The Flight into Egypt, was spared destruction since it was in Connecticut for repairs. The third Notre Dame was designed and built around that window. The three angels that had adorned the sanctuary lamp and two candlesticks, though in the middle of the blaze, managed to survive the inferno and are part of the new church. The Sacred Heart Monument also miraculously survived the blaze even though it was in close proximity to the church. It was only in 1986 that the new church was built and ready for use. The orientation of the new building is the reverse of the old one. The new church's "front" sits in the footprint of the old church's "rear."

In 2012, it was revealed that Notre Dame de Lourdes Parish would be merging with the parish of Immaculate Conception Parish. That occurred in June 2012, uses Notre Dame as its church and takes the name St. Bernadette.

== School ==
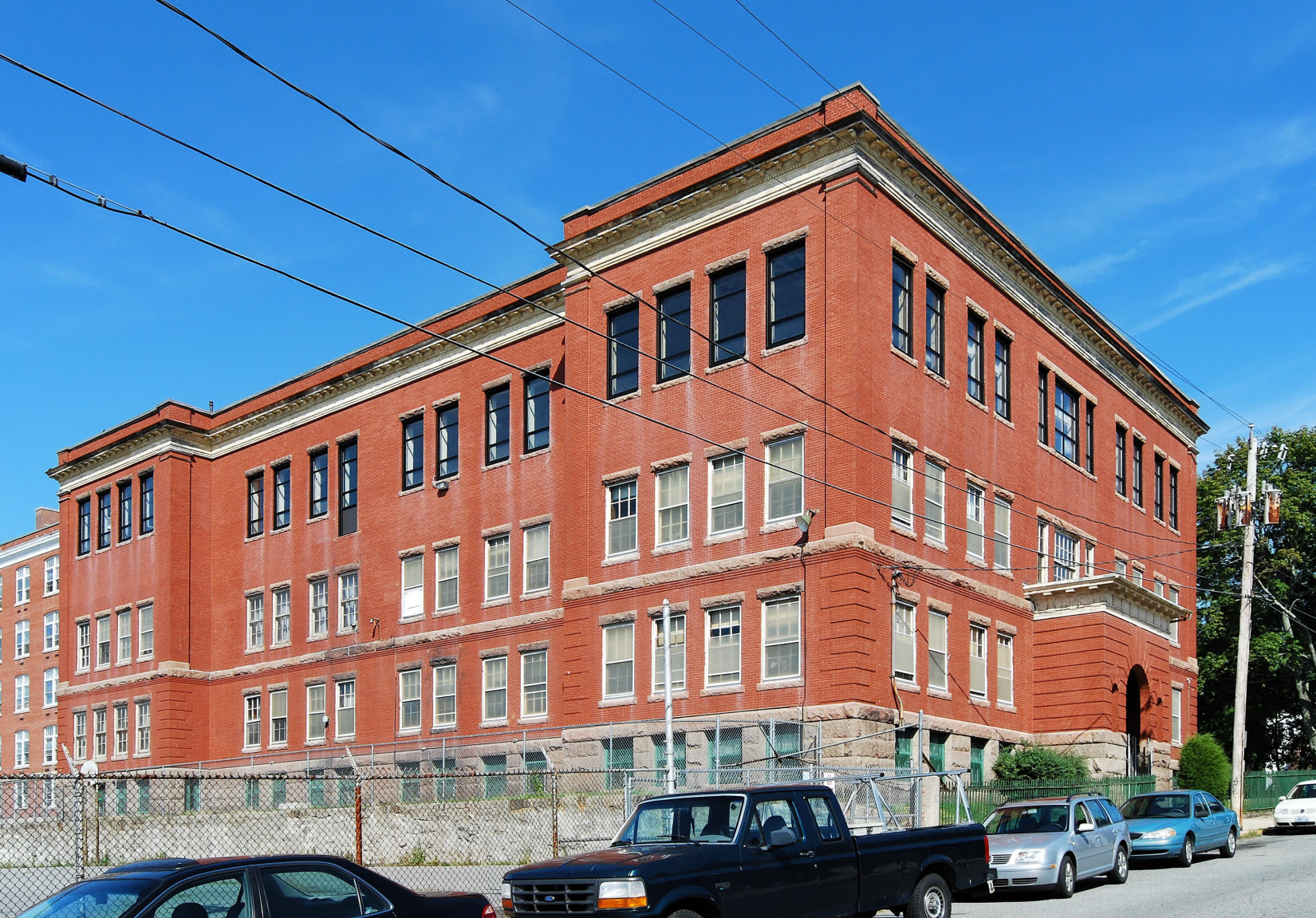
Notre Dame School

Located in the Flint neighborhood, Notre Dame School opened in 1876, with the final building opening in 1890. Its enrollment declined from 1,616 in 1920 to 145 in 2008. It closed in 2008.

== Closure of parish ==
In May 2018, only six years after the merger, the church faced declining Mass attendance and increasing debt. It was announced that St. Bernadette Parish would close, and the final Mass was held on August 5, 2018, by Bishop Edgar M. da Cunha.

== See also ==
- St. Anne's Church and Parish Complex
- St. Patrick's Church (Fall River, Massachusetts)
