= Louis E. Destremps =

American architect

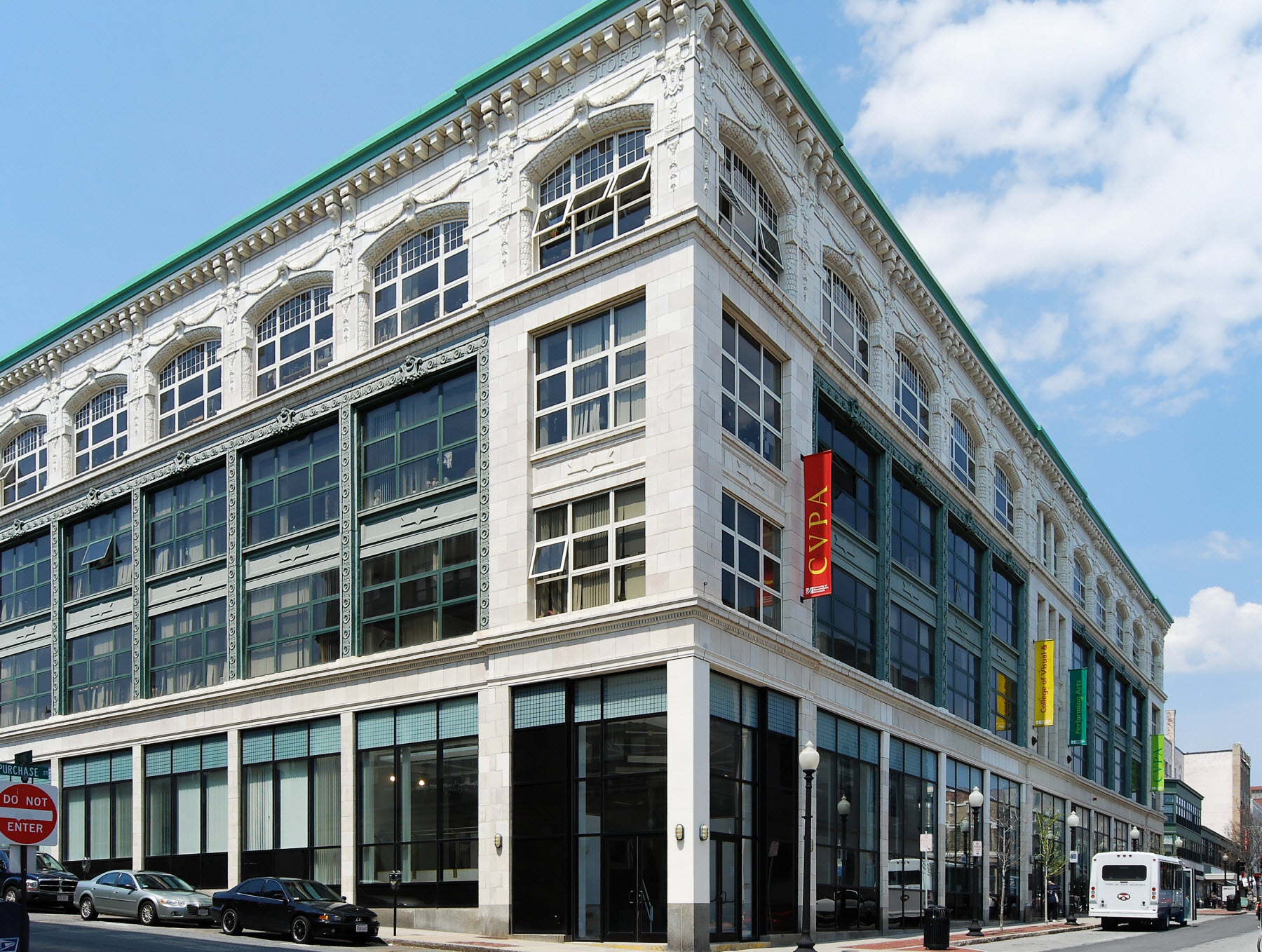
Star Store, New Bedford

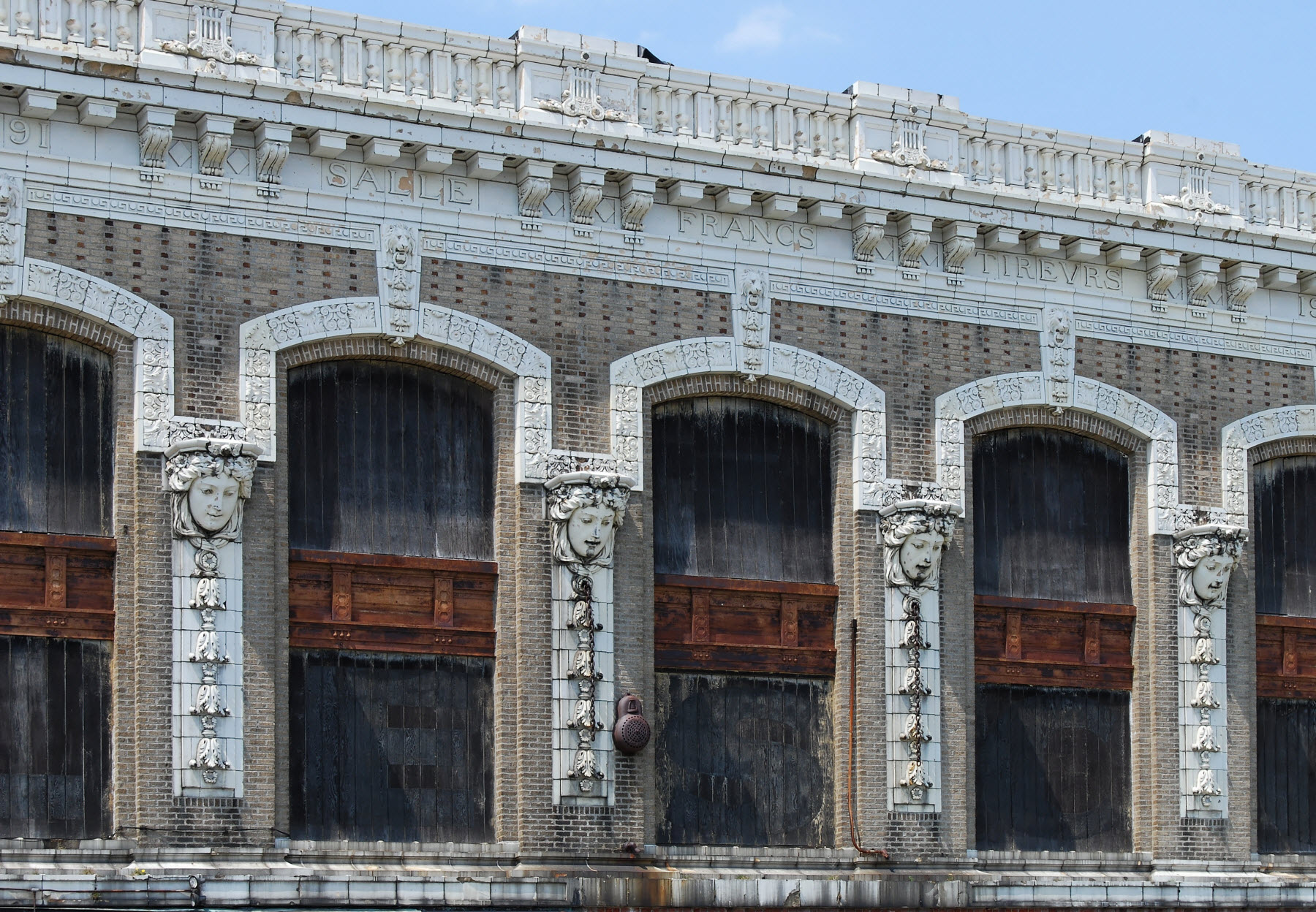
Orpheum Theatre, New Bedford

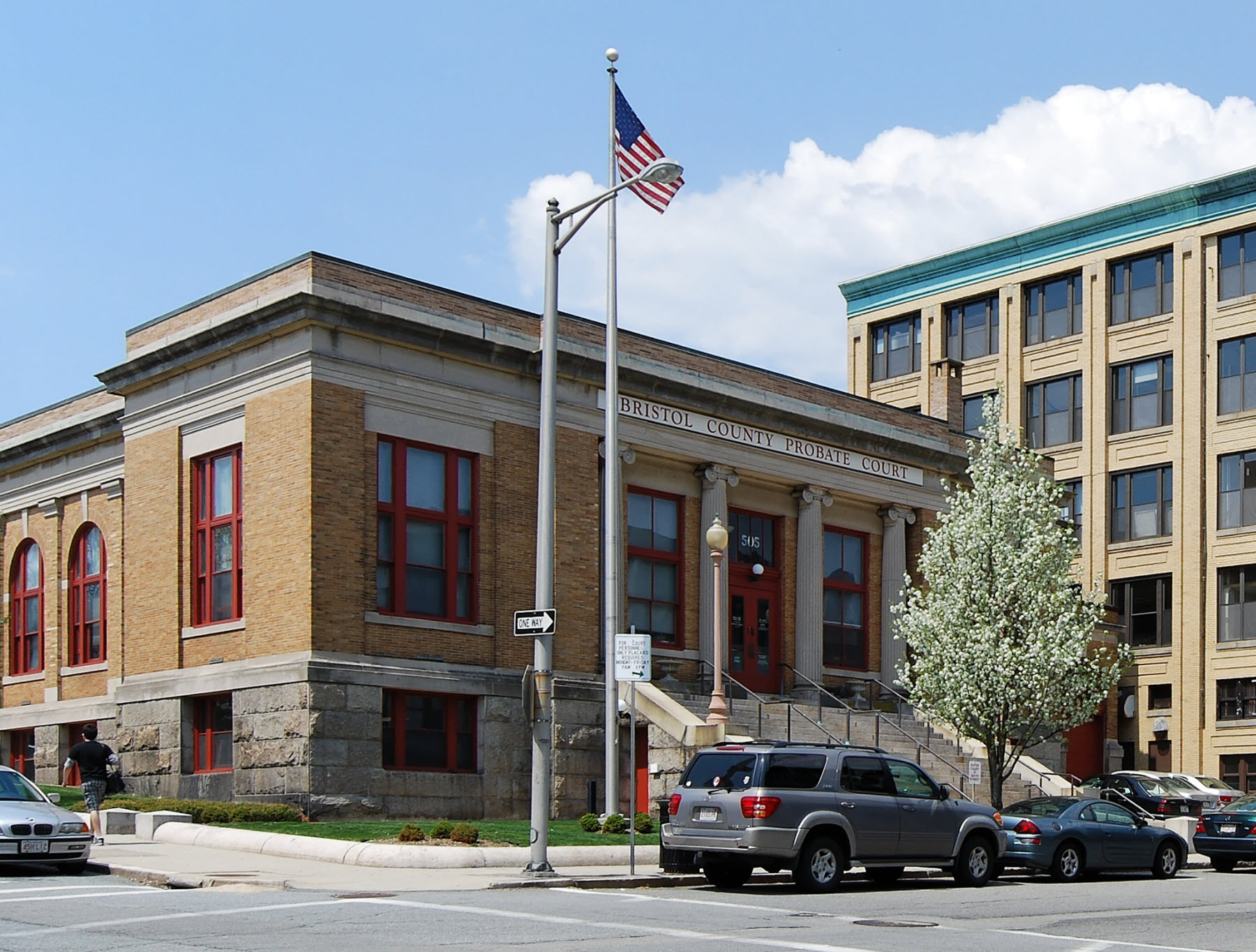
Third District Courthouse, New Bedford

Louis E. Destremps was a Canadian-born American architect who designed several notable buildings in the New Bedford, Massachusetts area. Among his most notable works are the Orpheum Theatre and Star Store. He was the son of architect Louis G. Destremps, who primarily practiced in Fall River, Massachusetts.

== Early life and career ==
Destremps was born on June 9, 1875, in Montreal, Quebec, Canada. He later lived in New York City where he received his early education. His family later moved to Fall River, Massachusetts where his father established his firm. Destremps joined his father's firm at age eighteen, where he worked for four years before moving to Newport, Rhode Island, joining the firm of Andrews & Withers. Destremps also later worked in that firm's New York office.

Destremps married Antonia Latrobe of Pittsfield, Massachusetts on June 16, 1897. They had three children together.

In 1905, Destremps moved to New Bedford and established his own office in the Masonic Building. He soon established himself as one of the area's premier architects. During this period, his designs included numerous public and private buildings, including the Orpheum Theatre, the Star Store Building, and several school buildings in New Bedford.

In 1919 his practice was succeeded by LaBrode & Bullard, the partnership of Leo L. LaBrode and Egbert G. Bullard.

== Works include ==
- Star Store, New Bedford, Massachusetts
- Orpheum Theatre, 1912, New Bedford, Massachusetts
- Union Street Railway Carbarn, New Bedford, Massachusetts
- Elks Building, New Bedford, Massachusetts
- Third District Court Building
- Winslow School
- Lincoln School
- Jireh Swift School
