= Napoléon Bourassa =

Canadian architect, painter and writer

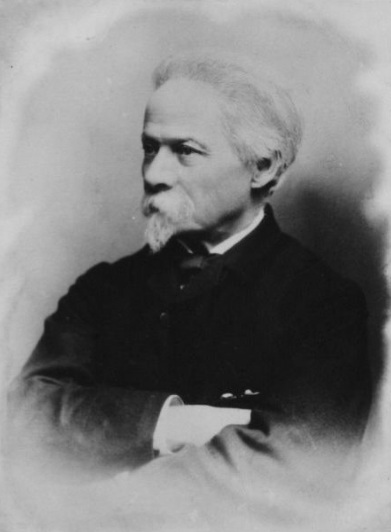
- Bourassa in 1896
- Born: 1827; L'Acadie, Quebec, Canada
- Died: 1916 (aged 88–89); Montreal, Quebec, Canada
- Known for: architect and artist

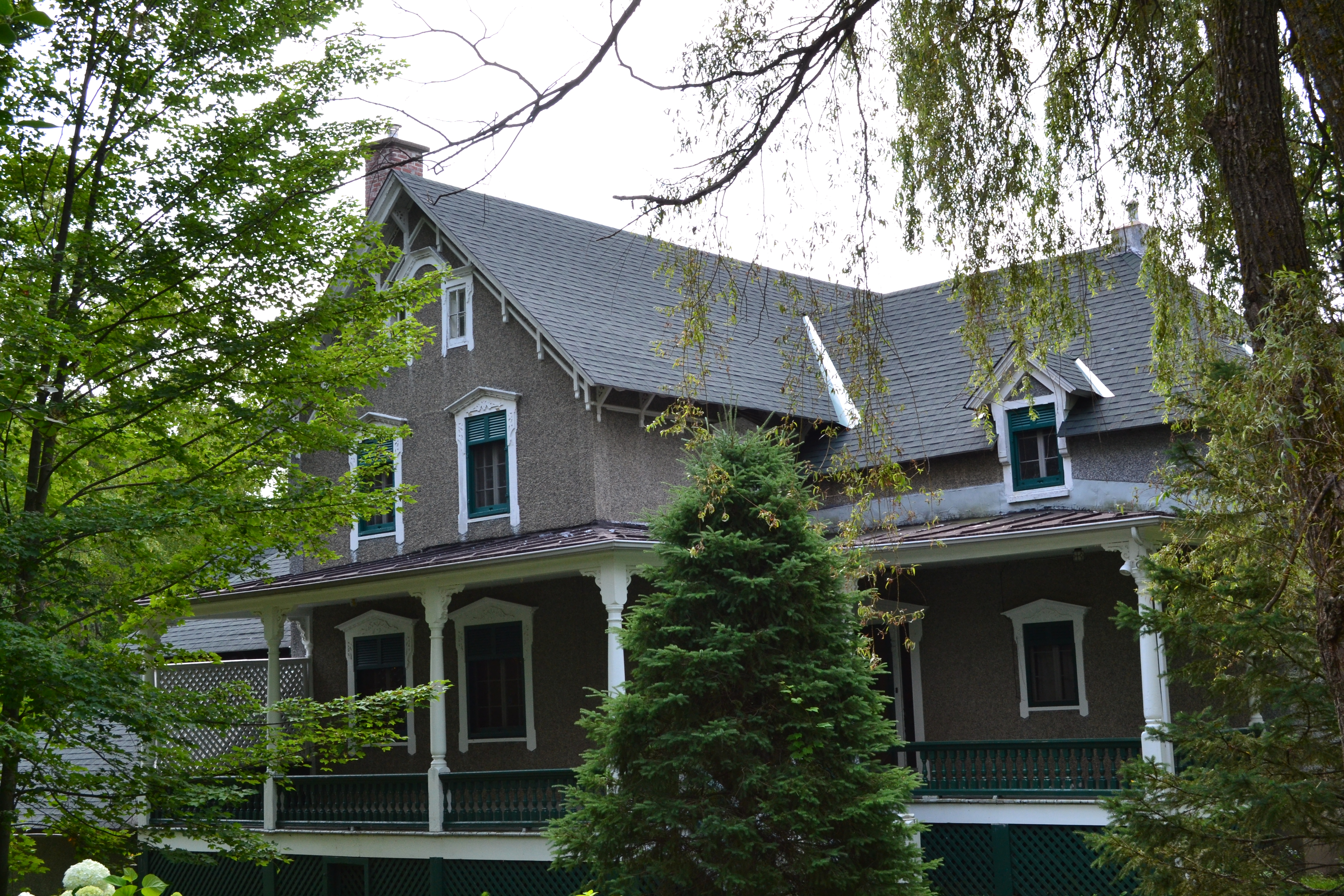
Maison Bourassa in Montebello, Québec

Napoléon Bourassa (French pronunciation: [napɔleɔ̃ buʁasa]; October 21, 1827 – August 27, 1916) was a prominent Canadian architect, painter and writer whose offices were located in Montreal, Quebec.

== Early life and training ==
Born in L'Acadie, Quebec, to François Bourassa, and Geneviève Patenaude. He studied at Sulpician College in Montreal. In 1848, he interned with Norbert Dumas in preparation for a legal career, but then chose to become a painter and studied with Theophile Hamel from 1850 to 1852.

He continued his education by visiting Paris, Rome and Florence accompanied by the German painter Johann Friedrich Overbeck, a member of the Nazarene movement. After this he established his art studio in Montebello.

== Practice ==
Bourassa founded and directed the Canadian Journal and became vice-president of the Saint-Jean-Baptiste Society. He resided on 430 Rue Bonsecours Montreal. Bourassa had several associates who became famous, including Louis-Philippe Hébert, François-Édouard Meloche and Olindo Gratton. He also sculpted the bust of his father-in-law Louis-Joseph Papineau.

He designed the "Chapelle Notre-Dame de Lourdes de Montréal" and the "Institut Nazareth et Louis Braille". One of his most familiar paintings is The Apotheosis of Christopher Columbus.

In 1877, he was a member of a commission of inquiry of the government of Quebec and went to France to study the organization, the functioning and the teaching methods of the schools of arts and crafts and the schools of drawing applied to industry, architecture and mechanics.

In 1880, he founded the National Gallery of Canada with his fellow artists. He consulted in 1883 for the construction of a building to house the Legislative Assembly of Quebec.

He died August 27, 1916, in Lachenaie. His daughter Adine published his correspondence in 1929. The "Fund-Napoleon Bourassa" was created in his honor at the University of Ottawa. His works were exhibited at Galerie L'Art français

== Family ==
Napoléon Bourassa was married to Azélie Papineau, the daughter of the Quebec politician Louis-Joseph Papineau. In 1869 his wife died, leaving him to raise their five children. One of their sons was Henri Bourassa, a journalist and the founder of the newspaper Le Devoir.

== Works include ==
- St. Anne Shrine Church, Fall River Massachusetts: with architect (with Louis G. Destremps)
- Church of Montebello, Montebello, Quebec, architect
- Dominican convent of Saint-Hyacinthe
- Chapel of the Ladies of Sacred Heart
- Chapelle Notre Dame de Lourdes de Montréal
- Chapelle du Manoir Louis-Joseph Papineau
- Church of Montebello, Quebec
- St. Anne Shrine (Fall River, Massachusetts)
- Church of Saint-Hugues
- Church of Saint-Ours
- Renovation of the Saint Hyacinthe the Confessor Cathedral of Saint-Hyacinthe, Quebec

== Honours ==
- Royal Canadian Academy of Arts

== Gallery of works by Napoléon Bourassa ==
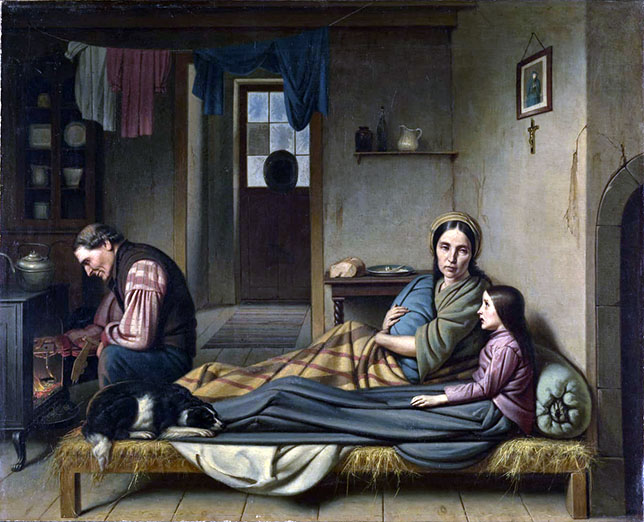
La Misère (1865)

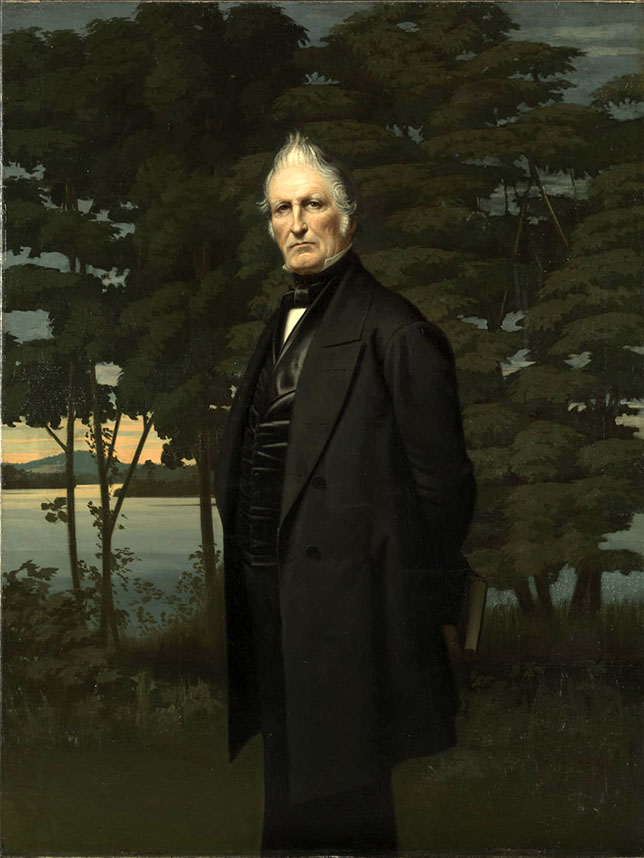
Louis-Joseph Papineau (1858)

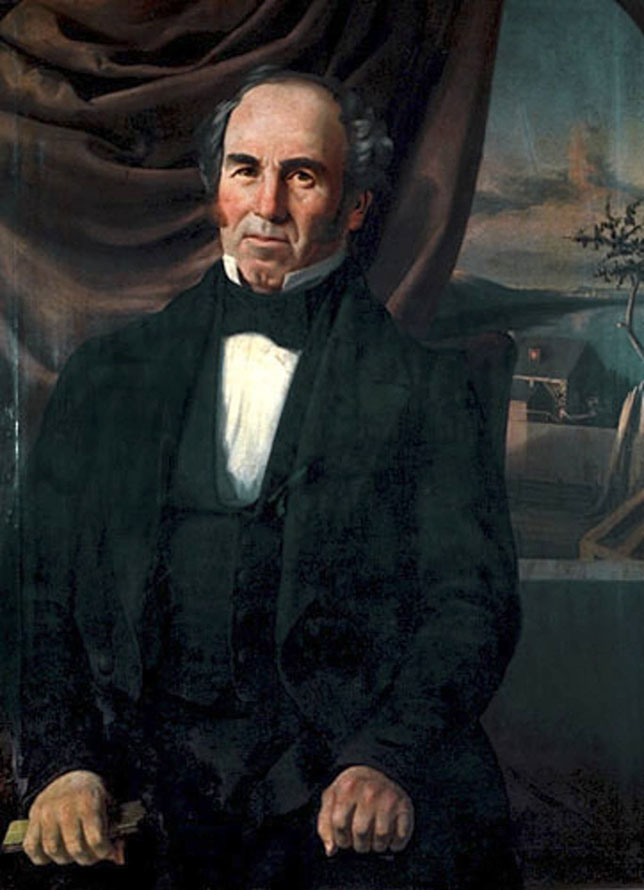
Hippolyte Fissiault dit Laramée (1860)

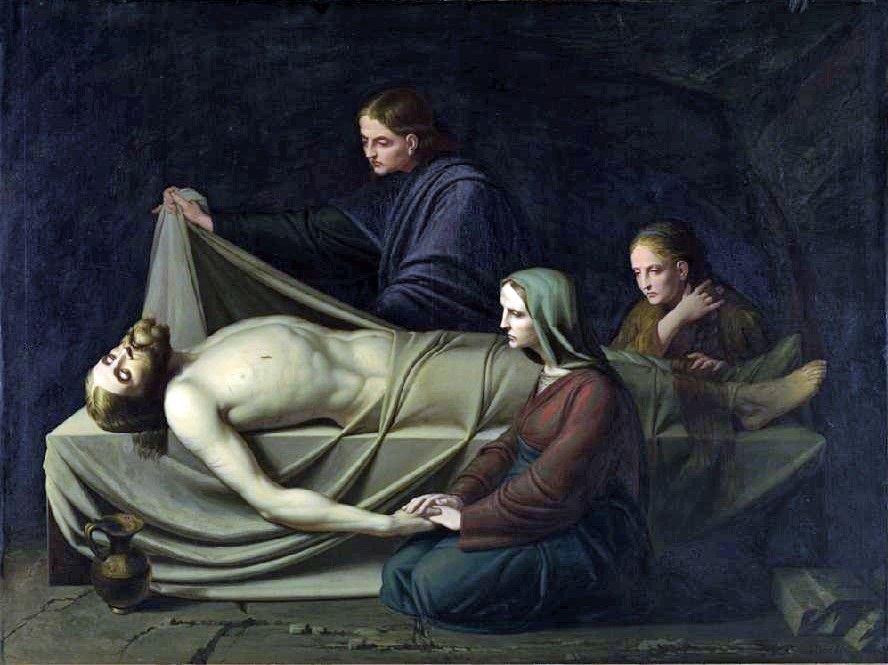
Deposition de croix (1867)

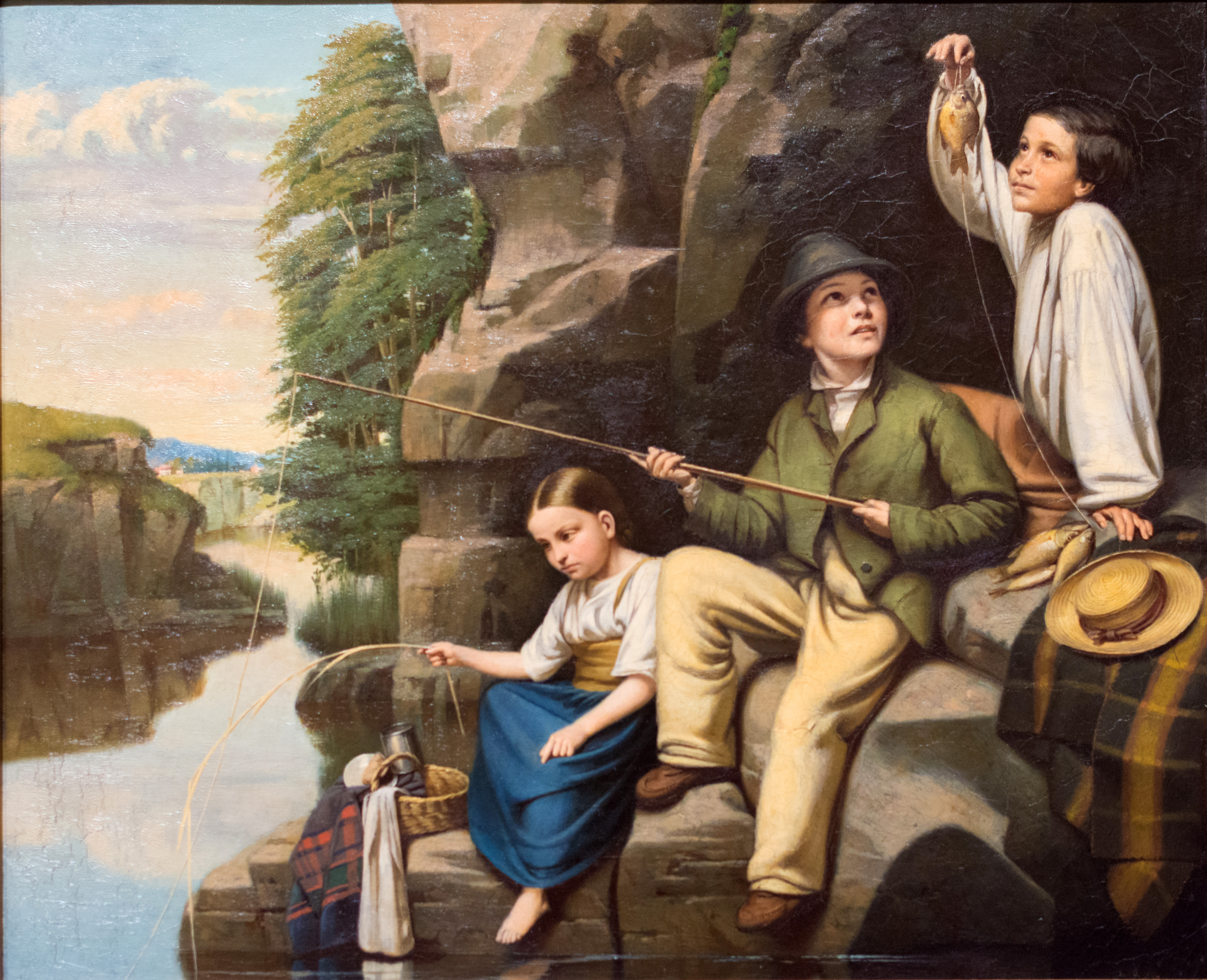
Les Petits Pêcheurs (1865)

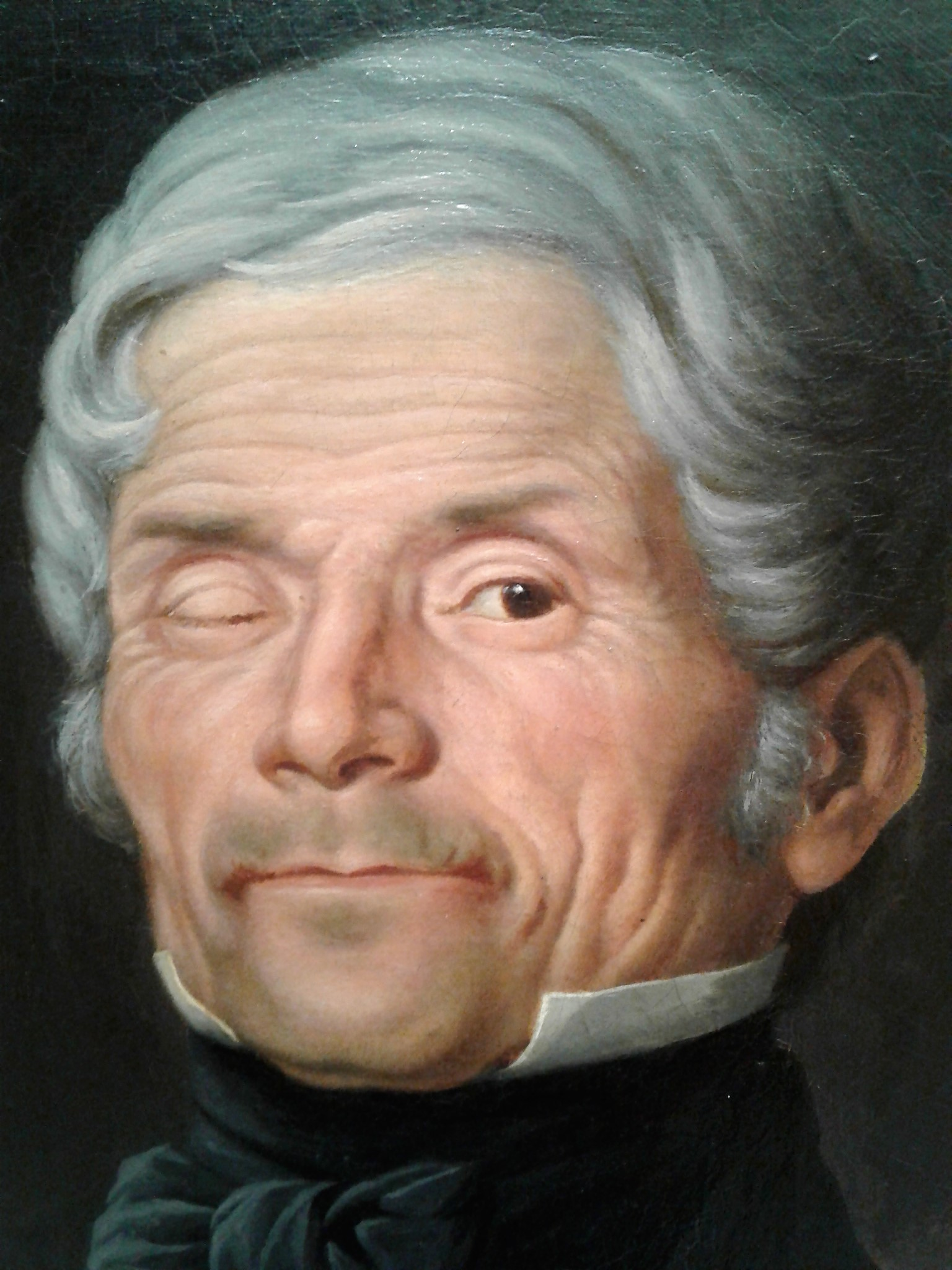
Francois Bourassa, (father of Napoleon Bourassa) (1851)

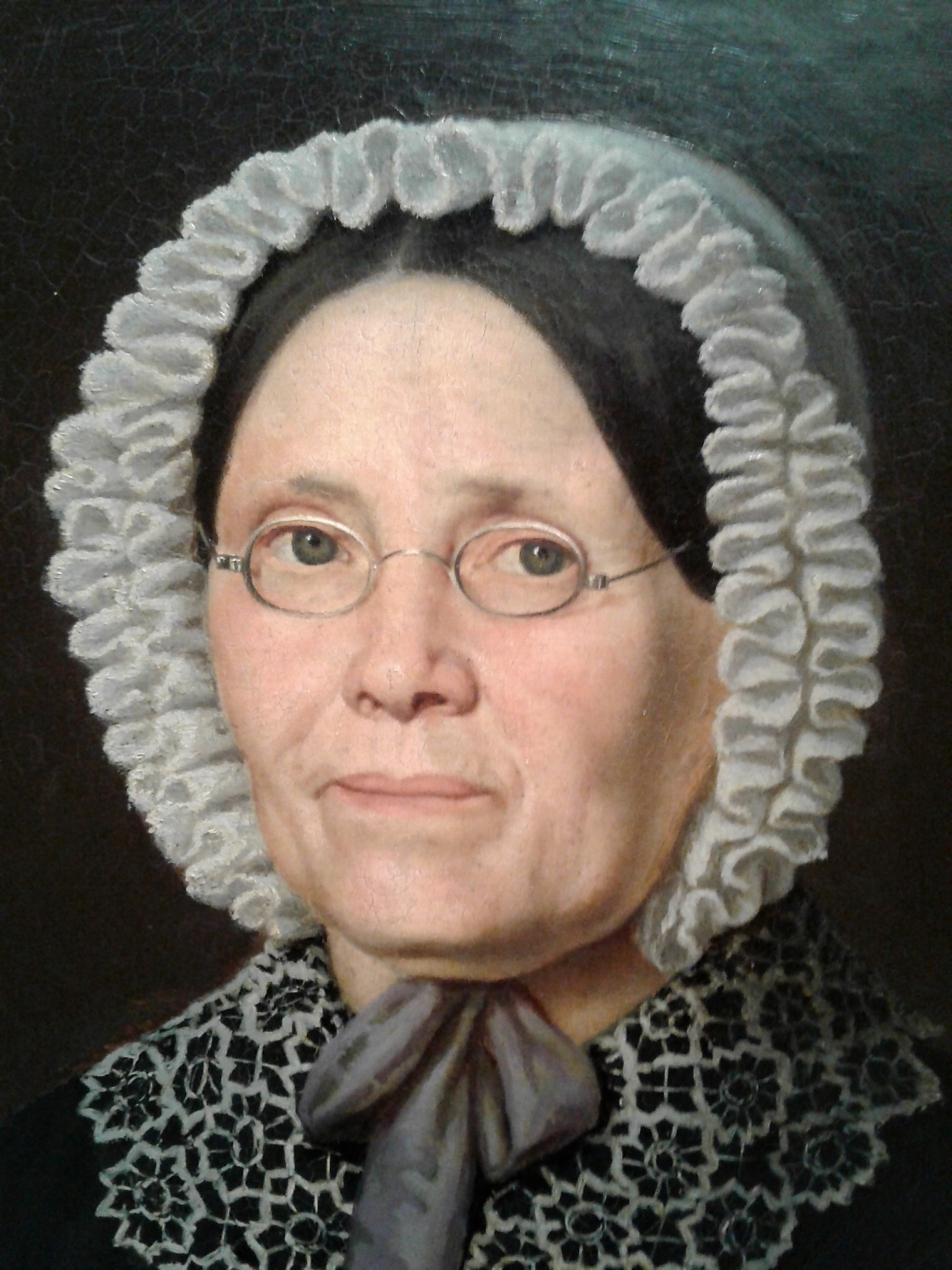
Madame Francois Bourassa, nee Genevieve Patenaude, mother of Napoleon Bourassa (1851)

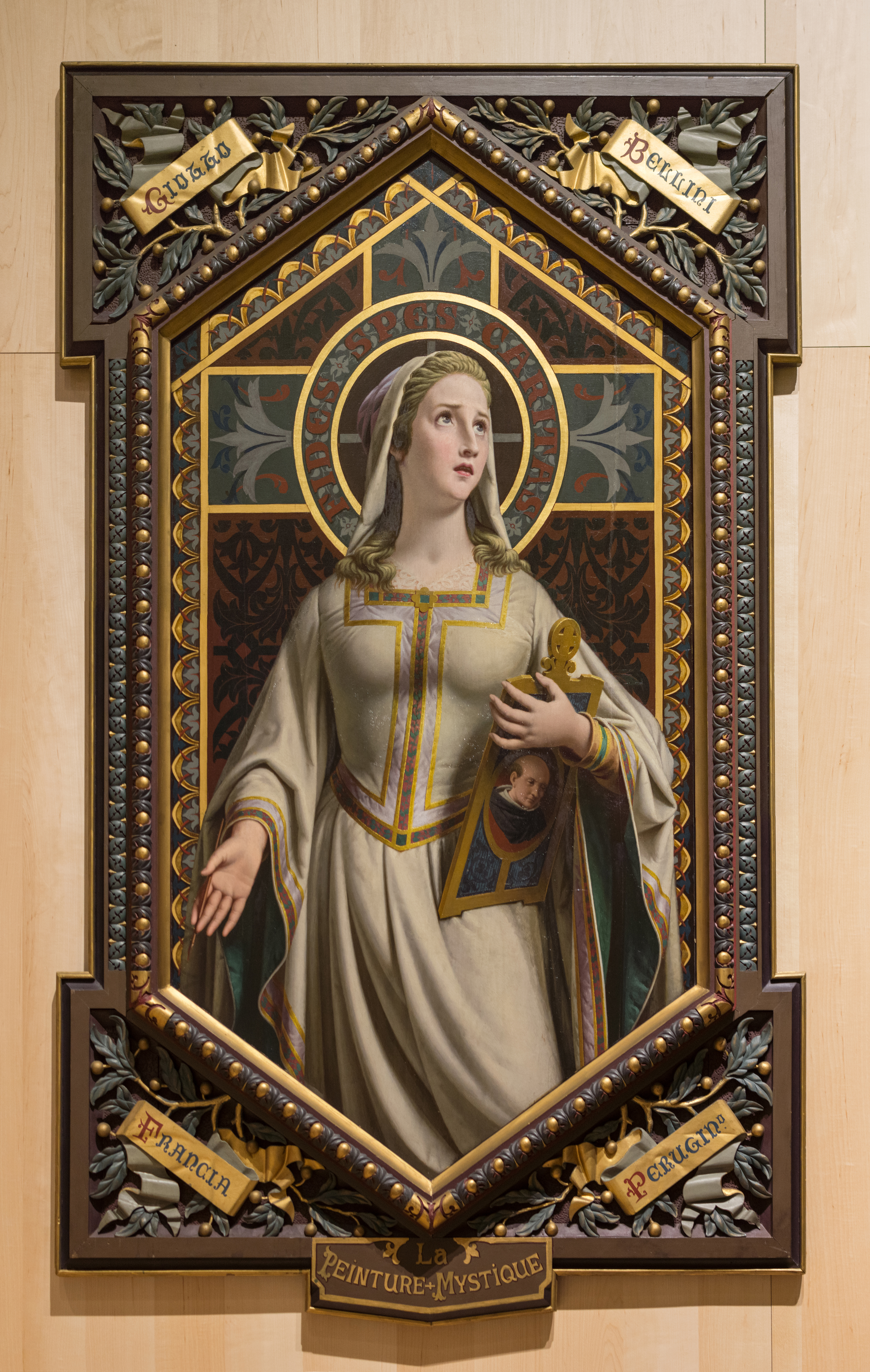
La Peinture mystique (1896-1897)

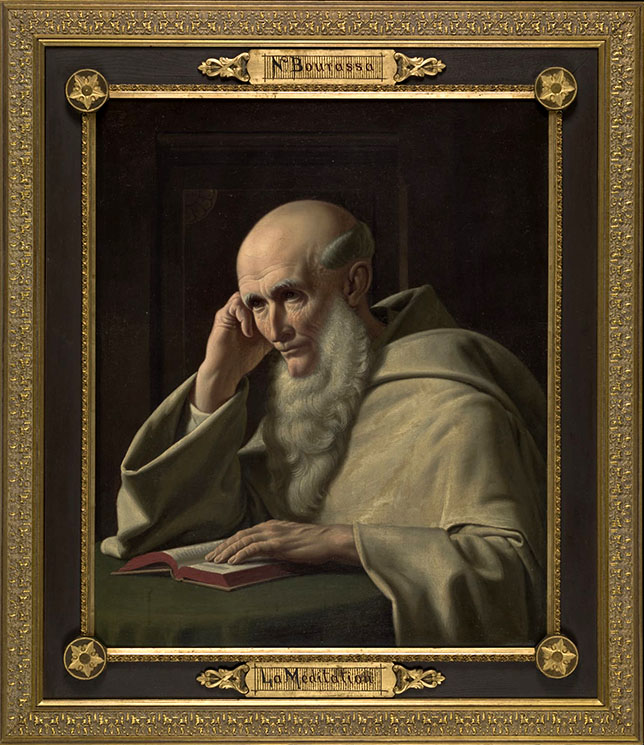
La Méditation (1896–97)

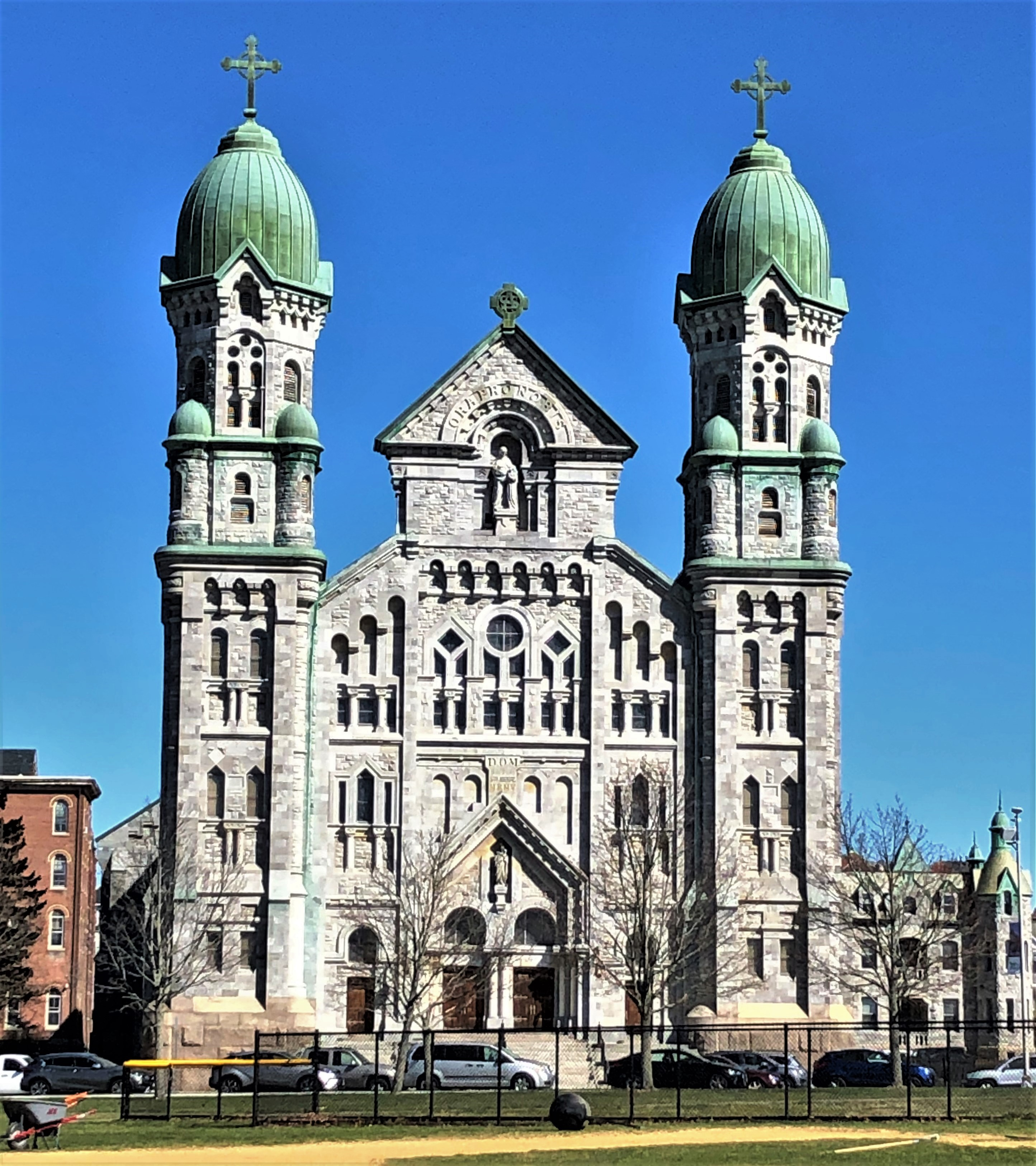
2021 St. Anne's Church, Fall River, Massachusetts

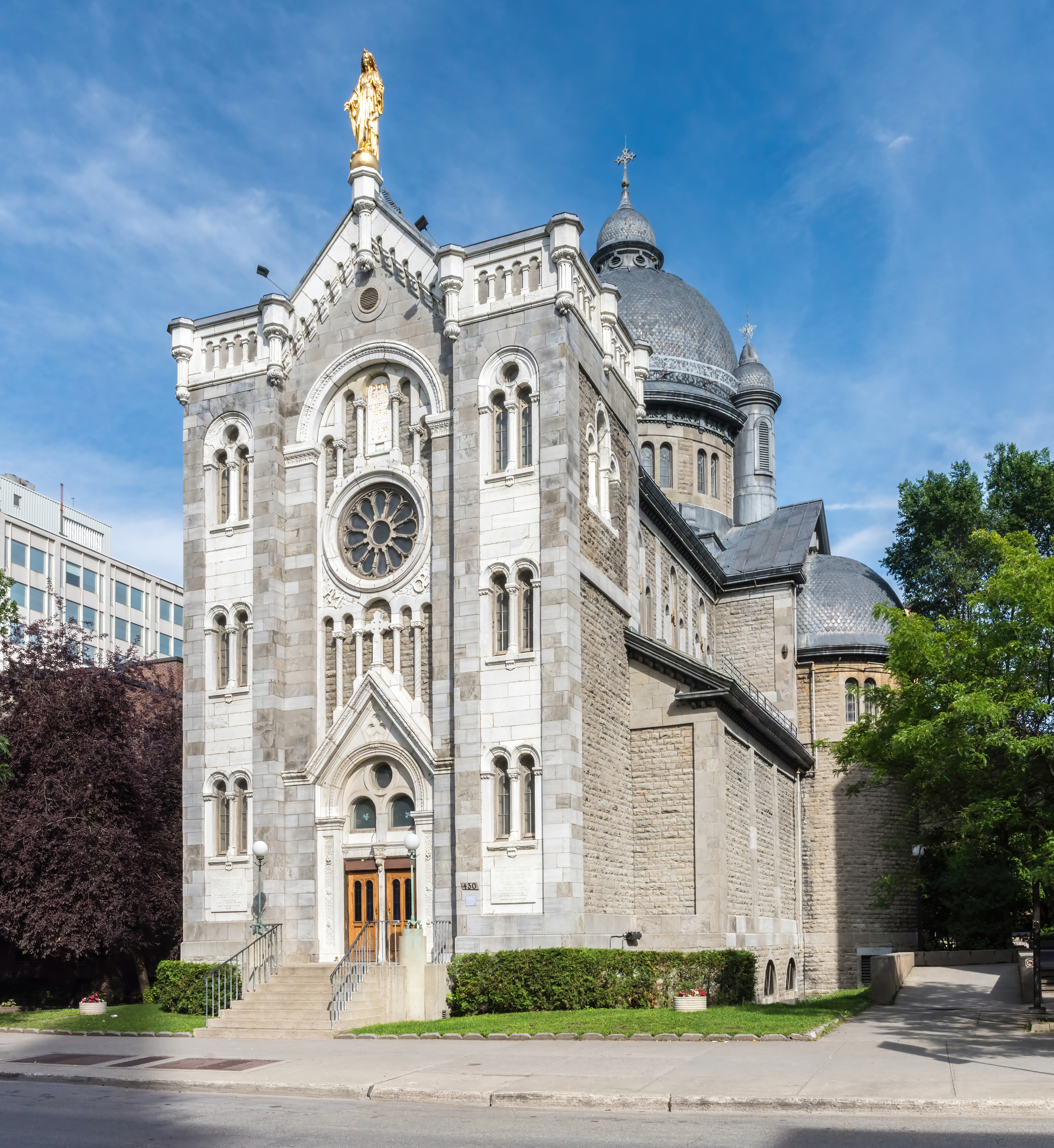
Notre-Dame-de-Lourdes Chapel, on Saint-Catherine street, Montreal

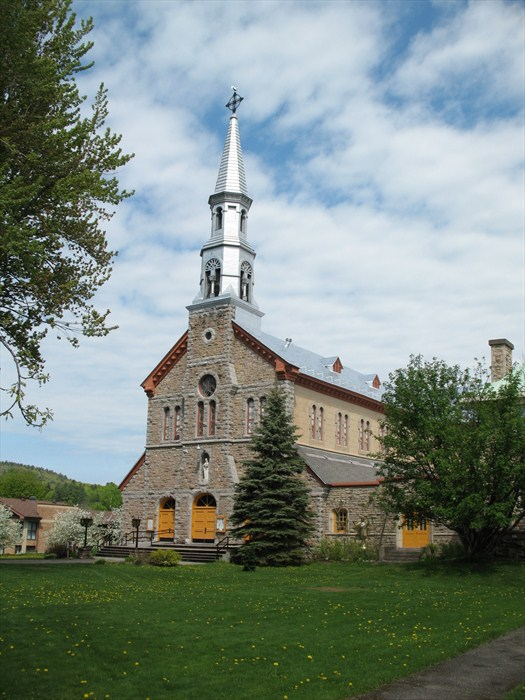
Church of Montebello, Montebello, Quebec

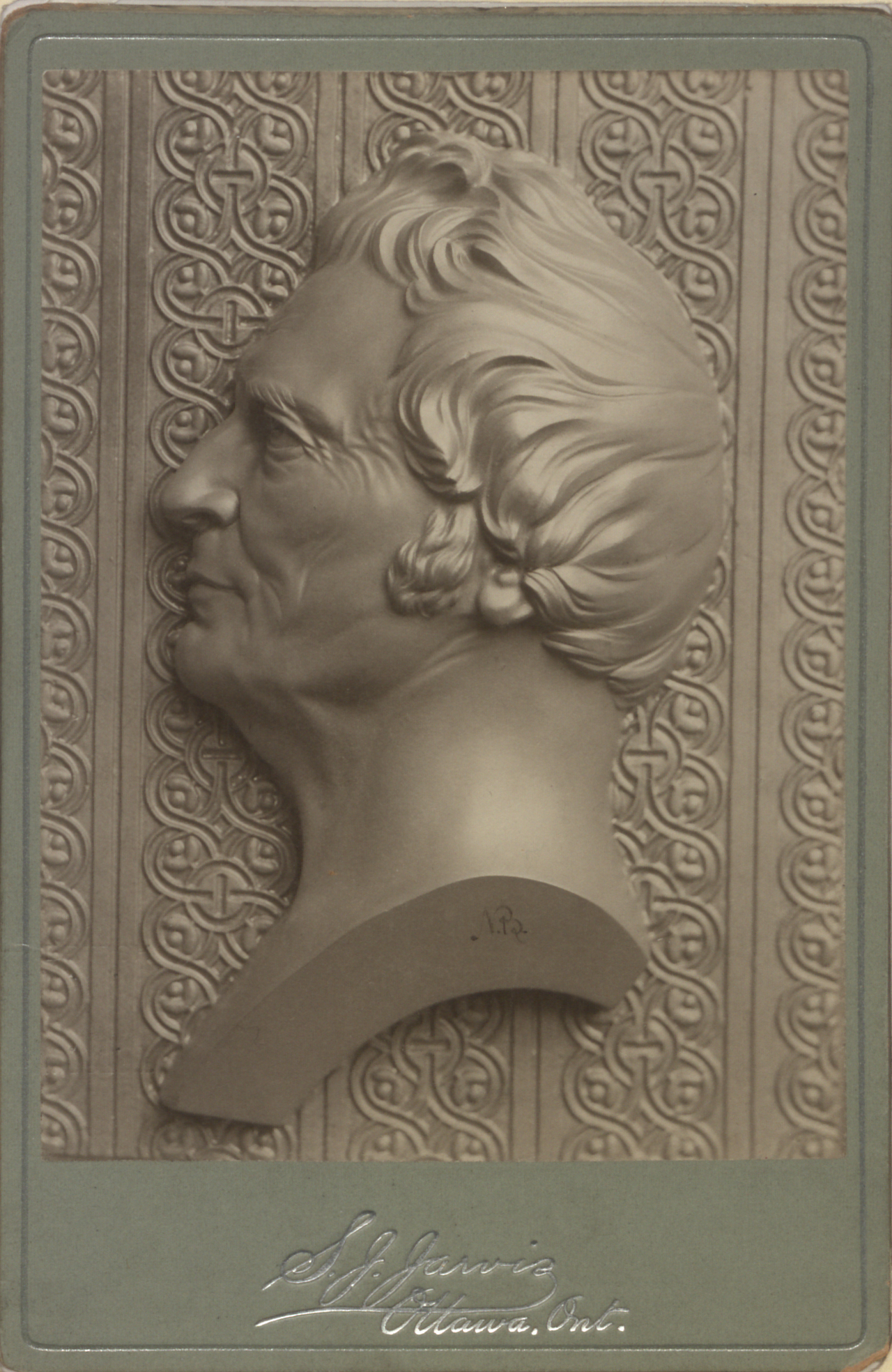
Louis-Joseph Papineau
