= W. J. M. Starkie =

Irish scholar and Greek translator

William Joseph Myles Starkie (10 December 1860 – 21 July 1920) was a noted Greek scholar and translator of Aristophanes. He was President of Queen's College, Galway (1897–1899) and the last Resident Commissioner of National Education for Ireland in the United Kingdom (1899–1920).

== Life ==
He was born at Rosses Point, Sligo, where his father was resident magistrate. He was the fifth son of William Robert Starkie JP and Francis Powers Starkie. He spent his early years at Creggane Manor in Rosscarbery near Cork with his four older brothers and younger sister, Edyth Starkie, who became a painter and was married to Arthur Rackham. After a short time at Clongowes Wood College he entered Shrewsbury School, Shropshire in 1877 and was the only Roman Catholic in the school. He became one of the Shrewsbury (Rowing) crew and was also Head of School before he went to Trinity College, Cambridge in 1880. Three years later he took his First in the Classical Tripos, and then abandoned the chance of a fellowship to set off and wander in Italy and Greece.

On his return to Ireland he chose to lead an academic career. Obliged to begin again as a freshman at Trinity College Dublin, he won the first classical scholarship, the Berkeley gold medal for Greek and was later awarded the Madden Prize, which allowed him to travel in Palestine and Persia. In 1890, having obtained the highest recorded marks in classics, he became a fellow and tutor of Trinity College. In 1897 he published The Wasps of Aristophanes, or Vespae which became the first of the Aristophanic works which established his distinction in the field. That same year he resigned his fellowship to become president of Queen's College in Galway. He received honorary degrees from Trinity College (1898) and the Royal University of Ireland (1909). In 1914 he became a member of the Privy Council of Ireland.

On 25 July 1893 he married May, the daughter of Cornelius Walsh, a Dublin solicitor. She had been one of his students at Alexandra College in Dublin where he had once taught classics. Hers was a colourful family that their two eldest children went on to describe, Enid in her autobiography, A Lady's Child, and Walter in his autobiography, Scholars and Gypsies. Their other children were Muriel, Ida (known as Chou-Chou), Nancy, and Humphrey Robert who died in infancy (1916).

== Resident commissioner of education ==
He was appointed Resident Commissioner of National Education for Ireland in February 1899 and showed the vigour and freedom from convention unusual in holders of official positions. He set out to reform the existing educational system and his opponents had reason to dread the vigour of his onslaught. He started with abolishing the 'Results' system in which the amount of a teacher's salary depended on the results of the annual oral examinations of their pupils. This tended to produce a very mechanical form of teaching aimed mainly at satisfying the Inspector. A child could pass a Reading Test and not understand a word of it. With the payment of a regular salary matters improved. In 1904 he began a campaign to amalgamate small schools, but here he ran afoul of the Catholic Bishops and clergy. Catholic Canon law delegated the moral supervision of each child to his parish priest. In addition some clerics opposed the amalgamation of boys and girls schools as being morally dangerous. In the end the Catholic authorities prevailed.

He was responsible for making Shakespeare familiar to the boys and girls in the National schools throughout Ireland, and he also introduced Irish History into the National School's primary curriculum. Up until then the authorities forbade lessons in Irish History or even Geography to prevent any chance of nurturing independence in the classroom. When authorising the distribution of the pro-establishment Irish history text by Patrick Weston Joyce, Starkie stated, "There can be little doubt that the Board were guilty of narrow pedantry in neglecting as worthless the whole previous spiritual life of the pupil and the multitude of associations, imaginations, and sentiments that formed the contents of his consciousness." However, after the Easter Rising of 1916, he withdrew Joyce's text from the classrooms declaring the teaching of Irish history too dangerous a subject for the National schools. Some even claimed that by carrying recently sanctioned textbooks home children were actually corrupting their parents with nationalism.

He died at Cushendun on 21 July 1920 from diabetes, one year before the discovery of insulin. His son was the scholar Walter Starkie, known for his books on his travels with the Gypsies and as a Spanish translator. His eldest daughter was Enid Starkie, who was known for her biographies of French poets.

== Works translated ==
- The Wasps of Aristophanes (1897)
- Acharnians of Aristophanes (1909)
- The Clouds (1911)

== Other writings ==
- Recent editions of Catullus, (1890?)
- Recent Reforms in Irish Education, (1902)
- Dr. Starkie and the Catholic Clerical National School Managers of Ireland, (1903, with John Curry)
- A History of Irish Primary and Secondary Education during the last decade, (1911)
- Early Attic comedy and its bearings upon political and social life at Athens, (1911)
- Continuation Schools, (1912)
- Gospel According to St. Matthew XXVI.45, and XXVIII.2, (1920)
- An Aristotelian analysis of "the comic", illustrated from Aristophanes, Rabelais, Shakespeare and Molière, (1920)

Academic offices
Preceded by Thomas William Moffett	President of Queen's College Galway; 1897–1899	Succeeded by Alexander Anderson
