= John Hynes =

John Hynes may refer to:

- John Hynes (footballer) (born 1979), former Australian rules football player
- John Hynes (ice hockey) (born 1975), ice hockey coach
- John Hynes (politician) (1897–1970), Massachusetts politician
- John Hynes (priest), professor of archaeology and president of University College
- Jack Hynes (soccer) (1920–2013), Scottish-born American soccer forward
- John Hynes (rugby league), Australian rugby league footballer
- John J. Hynes (1872–1938), Newfoundland-born American labor union leader

== See also ==
- Jack Hynes (disambiguation)
- Hynes Convention Center, the John B. Hynes Veterans Memorial Convention Center located in Boston, Massachusetts
