= Vignette (graphic design) =

In graphic design, a unique form for a frame to an image

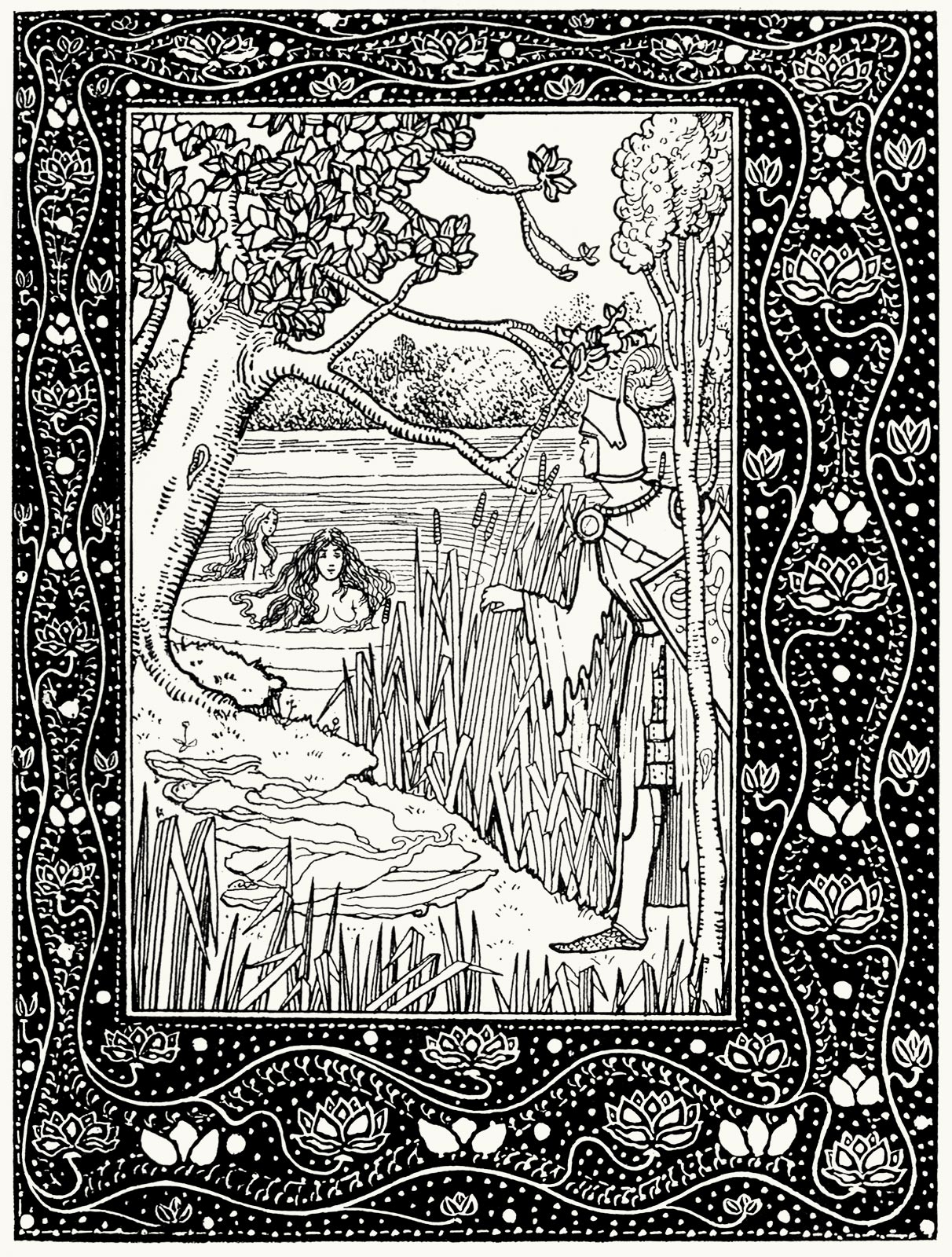
Vignette frame by William Brown Macdougall

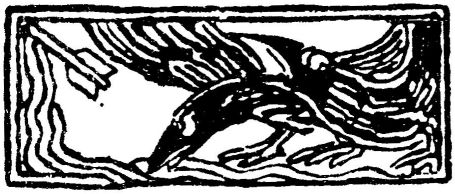
Eiriksonnenes saga - vignett 1 - G. Munthe

A vignette, in graphic design, is a French loanword meaning a unique form for a frame to an image, either illustration or photograph. Rather than the image's edges being rectilinear, it is overlaid with decorative artwork featuring a unique outline. This is similar to the use of the word in photography, where the edges of an image that has been vignetted are non-linear or sometimes softened with a mask – often a darkroom process of introducing a screen. An oval vignette is probably the most common example.

Originally a vignette was a design of vine-leaves and tendrils (vignette = small vine in French). The term was also used for a small embellishment without a border, in what otherwise would have been a blank space, such as that found on a title-page, a headpiece or tailpiece.

The use in modern graphic design is derived from book publishing techniques dating back to the Middle Ages Analytical Bibliography (c. 1450–1800) when a vignette referred to an engraved design printed using a copper-plate press, on a page that has already been printed on using a letter press (Printing press).

Vignettes are sometimes distinguished from other in-text illustrations printed on a copper-plate press by the fact that they do not have a border; such designs usually appear on title-pages only. Woodcuts, which are printed on a letterpress and are also used to separate sections or chapters are identified as a headpiece, tailpiece or printer's ornament, depending on shape and position.

== See also ==
- Calligraphy, another conjunction of text and decoration
- Scrollwork, general name for scrolling abstract decoration used in many areas of the visual arts
