= Walter Starkie =

Irish scholar, Hispanist, writer and musician (1894 - 1976)

Walter Fitzwilliam Starkie CMG, CBE, Litt.D (9 August 1894 – 2 November 1976) was an Irish scholar, Hispanist, writer, and musician. His reputation is principally based on his popular travel writing: Raggle-Taggle (1933), Spanish Raggle-Taggle (1934) and Don Gypsy (1936).

He is known as a translator of Spanish literature, and as a leading authority on the Romani people (Gypsies). He spoke the Romani language fluently.

== Early life ==
Born in Ballybrack, Killiney, County Dublin, he was the eldest son of William Joseph Myles Starkie (1860–1920) and May Caroline Walsh. His father was a noted Greek scholar and translator of Aristophanes and the last Resident Commissioner of National Education for Ireland in the United Kingdom (1899–1920). His aunt, Edyth Starkie, was an established painter married to Arthur Rackham. His godfather was John Pentland Mahaffy, the tutor of Oscar Wilde. The academic Enid Starkie was his sister. Starkie grew up surrounded by writers, artists, and academicians.

He was educated at Shrewsbury School and Trinity College, Dublin, where he graduated in 1920, taking first-class honours in classics, history, and political science. After winning first prize for violin at the Royal Irish Academy of Music in 1913, his father, wanting a more traditional career for his son, turned down an opportunity for Walter to audition for Sir Henry Wood, conductor of the London Symphony Orchestra. His violin teacher was the celebrated Italian virtuoso and composer, Achille Simonetti, a master who had been taught by Camillo Sivori, the only pupil of Niccolo Paganini.

He became a fellow of Trinity College in 1926 and the first Professor of Spanish in 1926; his position covered both Spanish and Italian (there was an earlier "Professorship of Modern Languages" created in 1776 also covering both Italian and Spanish). One of his pupils at Trinity was Samuel Beckett.

As Starkie suffered with chronic asthma throughout his life, he was sent to the warmer climate of Italy during World War I where he joined the YMCA providing entertainment for the British troops. After the armistice in November 1918, he befriended in the town of Montebello Vicentino five Hungarian Gypsy prisoners of war and aided them in acquiring wood to construct makeshift fiddles. To one of them, Farkas, he became a bloodbrother and he swore that he would someday visit Farkas in Hungary and mix with the Gypsy's tribe. That oath would affect the course of his life. While on tour in northern Italy he met Italia Augusta Porchietti, an Italian Red Cross nurse and amateur opera singer who was singing to patients and wounded soldiers at a hospital ward in Genoa. They were married on 10 August 1921 and had a son, Landi William, and a daughter, Alma Delfina.

== Abbey Theatre ==
After the publication of his book on Luigi Pirandello, Starkie became a director of the Abbey Theatre in 1927 at the invitation of W. B. Yeats. Recent productions had been fraught with controversy, and one of his roles was to act as arbiter among the factions. In 1928, while Starkie was away in Italy, Yeats, along with Lady Gregory and Lennox Robinson, the other two board members, rejected Seán O'Casey's fourth play, The Silver Tassie, his lament of the First World War. When he returned to Dublin he voiced his disagreement with the other board members saying that, "This play was written with the purpose of showing the useless brutality of war and the public should be allowed to judge it for themselves. O'Casey is groping for a new kind of drama and the Abbey should produce the play". In light of his previous successes at the Abbey Theatre the rejection caused much controversy and O'Casey severed his relations with the theatre and took the play to London where it premiered on 11 October 1929 at the Apollo Theatre with Charles Laughton and Barry Fitzgerald under the direction of Raymond Massey. To many observers the loss of O'Casey marked the beginning of a decline in the fortunes of the Abbey.

The following year (1928) the board rejected Denis Johnston's modernist play Shadowdance, and Starkie was charged with giving Johnston the bad news. In his spindly handwriting he wrote on the draft title-page the five words (referring to Lady Gregory), "The Old Lady Says NO", which Johnston used to retitle the play before putting on at Dublin's Gate Theatre the following year to considerable critical acclaim.

At the start of World War II, Britain chose to send Catholics to Spain as their representatives, and so the Irish-Catholic, fiddle-playing Starkie was sent to Madrid as the British Council representative, which took him away from the theatre and nightlife of Dublin, and into World War II Spain. He resigned from the Abbey Theatre on 17 September 1942 and on the same day he accepted the invitation of Hilton Edwards and Micheál MacLiammóir to be on the board of directors at the Gate Theatre.

He was one of the founders of the Centre International des Études Fascistes (CINEF). Its only publication, A Survey of Fascism (1928), had an article by him, "Whither is Ireland Heading – Is It Fascism? Thoughts on the Irish Free State." During the 1930s, he was an apologist for Benito Mussolini, whom he had interviewed in 1927. In general terms he was influenced by the Irish poet and mystic George William Russell (AE) in his writing on co-operatives. He travelled to Abyssinia in 1935 and later wrote in favour of the Italian campaign there, opposing Éamon de Valera's call for sanctions, fearing they would further isolate Italy and drive Benito Mussolini into an alliance with Adolf Hitler. However soon after his appointment in Madrid his wife dropped her first name "Italia" to avoid being branded an agent of Mussolini. In the mid-1930s, he was involved in a pro-Nazi international network, the Internationale Arbeitsgemeinschaft der Nationalisten, where he chaired the Akademie für die Rechte der Völker.

== British Institute, Madrid ==
Sent to Spain as the British cultural representative he was the founder and first director of the British Institute in Madrid (1940–1954), and went on to open branches in Barcelona, Bilbao, Seville and Valencia. The institute was backed by the British Council and through lectures and exhibitions worked to influence Spanish opinion during World War II and help maintain Spanish neutrality. Upon accepting this position he made a promise to Lord Lloyd not to write any new books and to put the "Raggle-Taggle Gypsies" to rest for the duration of the war. However, Spain, owing to her non-belligerent status, became an asylum for refugees from all over Europe, so his promise to curtail hobnobbing with Gypsies became impractical. The Institute stood apart from the British Embassy, which tended to be stand-offish toward their local nationals. It was in itself an embassy to the survivors of Spain's intellectual eclipse following the Spanish Civil War. One of Starkie's early triumphs was organising a recital by the Czech pianist Rudolf Firkušný, who in October 1940 was passing through Madrid on his way to the United States. Starkie was able to locate a new Steinway and the concert went ahead, bringing together a significant gathering of Madrid society as well as representatives from the American Embassy and Dutch, Polish, Egyptian, Turkish, and Czech Ministers.

In May 1943, the actor Leslie Howard came to Madrid to present a lecture on Hamlet in which he showed similarities between the play and the actions of Hitler. On his return trip to London from Lisbon, the plane on which he was travelling, BOAC Flight 777, was shot down over the Bay of Biscay. Among the four crew and thirteen passengers who died was the prominent Anglo-German and Jewish activist Wilfrid Israel, Francis German Cowlrick, and Gordon Thomas MacLean, who had lunched together at the British Institute in Madrid.

On any one evening, Starkie could count on finding in the Institute at Calle Almagro 5, a novelist such as Pío Baroja, a writer like Camilo José Cela (Winner of the Nobel Prize in Literature, 1989), the essayist Azorín, composers like Joaquín Rodrigo and painters such as Ignacio Zuloaga. He left behind him a thriving Institute. During the war he also helped organise and operate an escape route across the Pyrenees for British airmen shot down over France. Walter and Augusta Starkie also allowed their large flat at number 24 Calle del Prado to be used as a safe house for escaping prisoners of war and Jewish refugees.

From 1947 to 1956, Starkie was professor of comparative literature at the Complutense University of Madrid. In 1954, he was elected an honorary fellow of Trinity College, Dublin. After he retired from the British Institute, he accepted a university position in the United States. It was his third American tour, taking him to the University of Texas, Austin (1957–58), New York University (1959), the University of Kansas (1960), University of Colorado (1961), and finally to the University of California, Los Angeles (1961–70) where as Professor-in-Residence he was assigned to lecture in six Departments (English, Folklore-Mythology, Italian, Music, Spanish-Portuguese, and Theatre).

After his retirement from U.C.L.A., Starkie returned with his wife, Italia Augusta, to live in Madrid. After suffering from a severe cardiac asthma attack he died there on 2 November 1976. Italia followed him six months later on 10 May 1977. They are buried in the British Cemetery in Madrid.

== Writings ==
He won fame for his travels and was profiled by Time Magazine as a modern-day 'gypsy'. He published accounts of his experiences as a university vacation vagabond following the trail of the Gypsies in Raggle Taggle, subtitled "Adventures with a fiddle in Hungary and Roumania" and sequels, Spanish Raggle Taggle and Don Gypsy which are picaresque accounts in the tradition of George Borrow, with frontispieces by Arthur Rackham. His observations of Gypsy life, while more anecdotal than scholarly, provide insights into these nomadic people.

Julian Moynahan said of Starkie in reviewing Scholars and Gypsies for The New York Times Book Review (24 November 1963):

"Many lives have been more interesting and enviable in the telling than the living, but not so here. Emerging from the shadow of a somewhat blighted inheritance, Walter Starkie chose and enjoyed a lifelong freedom which most of us throw away with both hands on the day we leave school and take our first jobs."

Starkie was the President of the Gypsy Lore Society from 1962 to 1973.

In addition to publishing a 1964 translation of plays from the Spanish Golden Age in the Modern Library volume as Eight Spanish Plays of the Golden Age, he published an abridged translation of Don Quixote in hardcover for Macmillan Publishers in London in 1954. Illustrated with drawings done by Gustave Doré in 1863 for the French language edition, Starkie's biographical introduction of Cervantes was 116 pages long. In 1957 the abridged version of his translation was published for Mentor Books in the United States with the introduction shortened to seven pages. In 1964 Starkie published his complete and unabridged version of his translation for New American Library. Written in contemporary English, both unabridged and abridged versions have been in print since their publications, and are considered highly accurate, but Starkie does occasionally put Irish slang and phrase construction (e.g. the phrase "I'm thinking", instead of "I think", and the oath "Bad 'cess to you!") into the mouths of its peasant characters. This is a trait he repeats in his translation of The Mask, a brief one-acter by Lope de Rueda published in Eight Spanish Plays of the Golden Age.

== Works ==
- Jacinto Benavente (1924)
- Luigi Pirandello (1926)
- Raggle-Taggle: Adventures with a Fiddle in Hungary and Romania (1933)
- Spanish Raggle-Taggle: Adventures with a Fiddle in Northern Spain (1934)
- Don Gypsy: Adventures with a Fiddle in Barbary, Andulusia and La Mancha (1936)
- The Waveless Plain: An Italian Autobiography (1938)
- Grand Inquisitor: Being an Account of Cardinal Ximenez de Cisneros and His Times (1940)
- Semblanza de Cervantes y Shakespeare (1946)
- In Sara's Tents (1953)
- Conferencia conmemorativa Eugene O'Neill (1954)
- The Road to Santiago: Pilgrims of St. James (1957)
- Spain: A Musician's Journey Through Time and Space (1958)
- Scholars and Gypsies: An Autobiography (1963)
- Homage to Yeats, 1865–1965: Papers Read at a Clark Library Seminar (1965)

== Works translated ==
- Tiger Juan – Ramón Pérez de Ayala (1933)
- The Spaniards in their History – Ramón Menéndez Pidal (1950)
- Tower of Ivory – Rodolfo Fonseca (1953)
- This is Spain – Ignacio Olagüe (1954)
- Don Quixote – Miguel de Cervantes (1954 abridged, and 1964 unabridged)
- The Deceitful Marriage and other Exemplary Novels – Cervantes (1963)
- Eight Spanish Plays of the Golden Age (1964)

== Decorations ==
- Knight of the Order of Alfonso XII (1928)
- Knight of the Legion of Honour (1931)
- Knight of the Order of the Crown of Italy (1933)
- Commander of the Order of the British Empire (1948)
- Knight of the Order of Isabella the Catholic
- Commander of the Order of St Michael and St George (1954)

== Bibliography ==
- Ensayos hispano-ingleses. Homanaje a Walter Starkie, José Janés (editor), Barcelona, (1948)
- Matteo Biagetti, Walter Starkie: Escritor, académico, peregrino, Edizioni Compostellane, (2010)
- Mary M. Burke, "Walter Starkie", The Cracked Looking-Glass, Princeton: Princeton University Library, (2011), pp. 95–100.
