= English Fairy Tales =

Illustrated book of 41 fairy tales (1918)

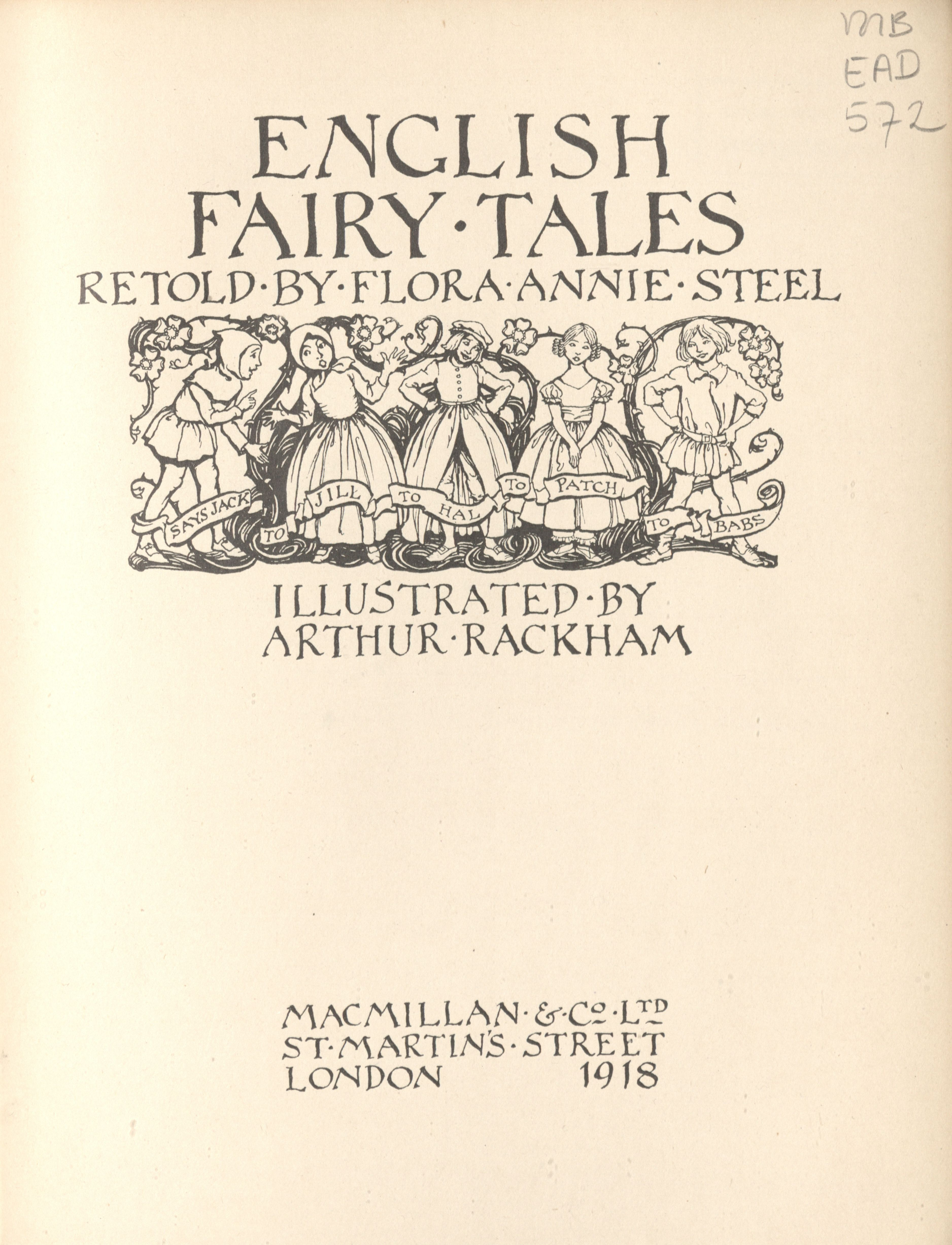
Title page

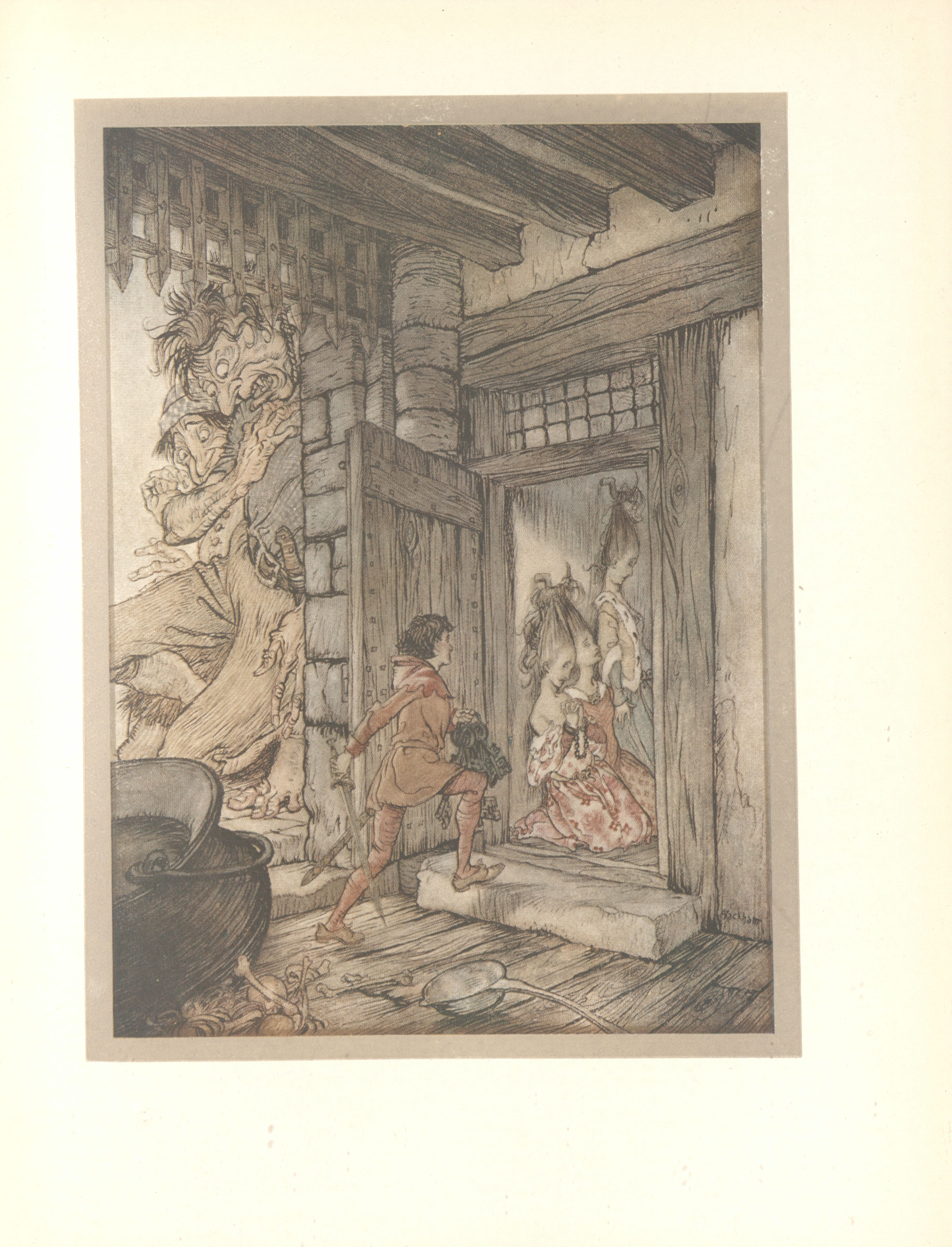
Page from the book

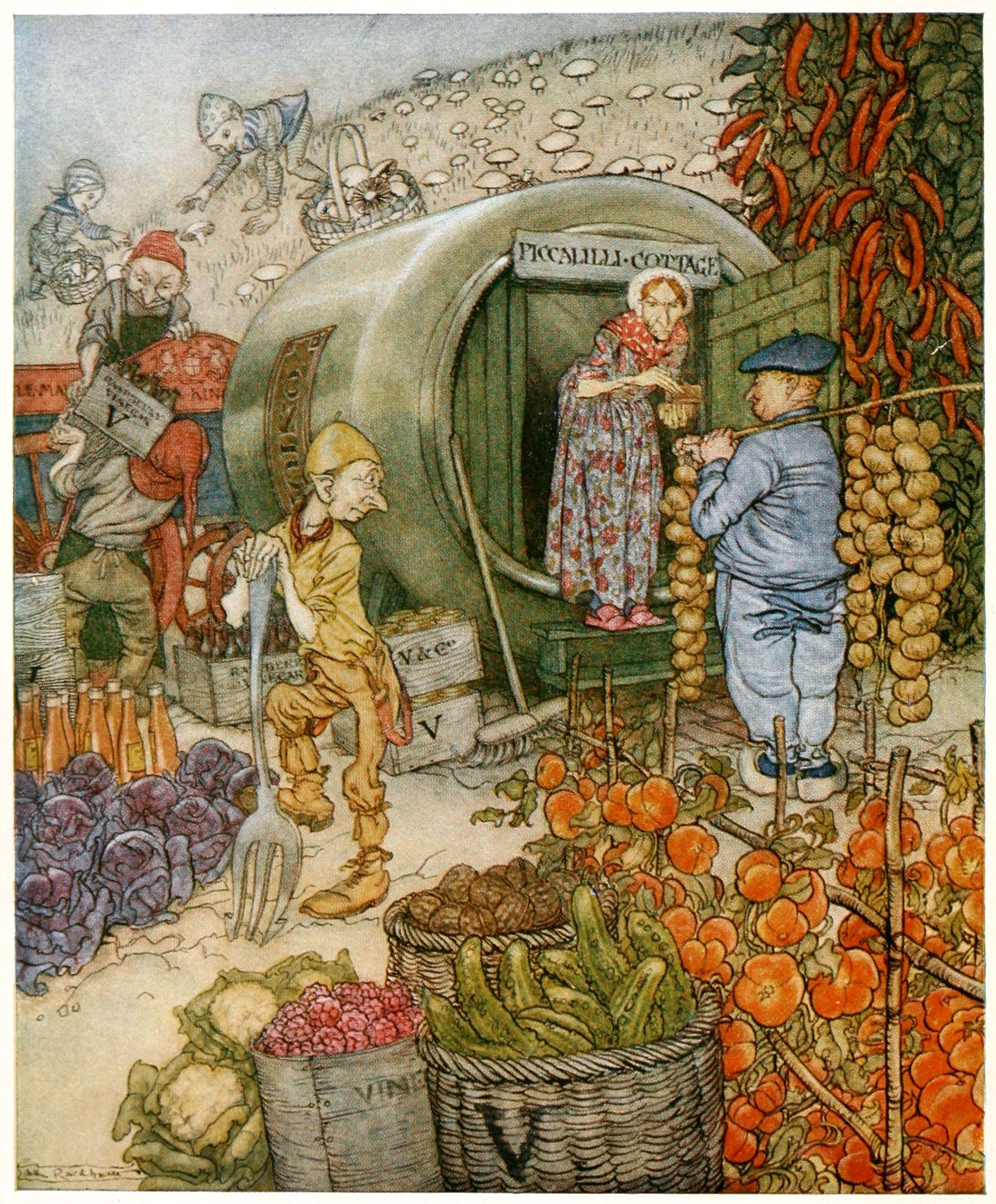
Frontispiece of the book

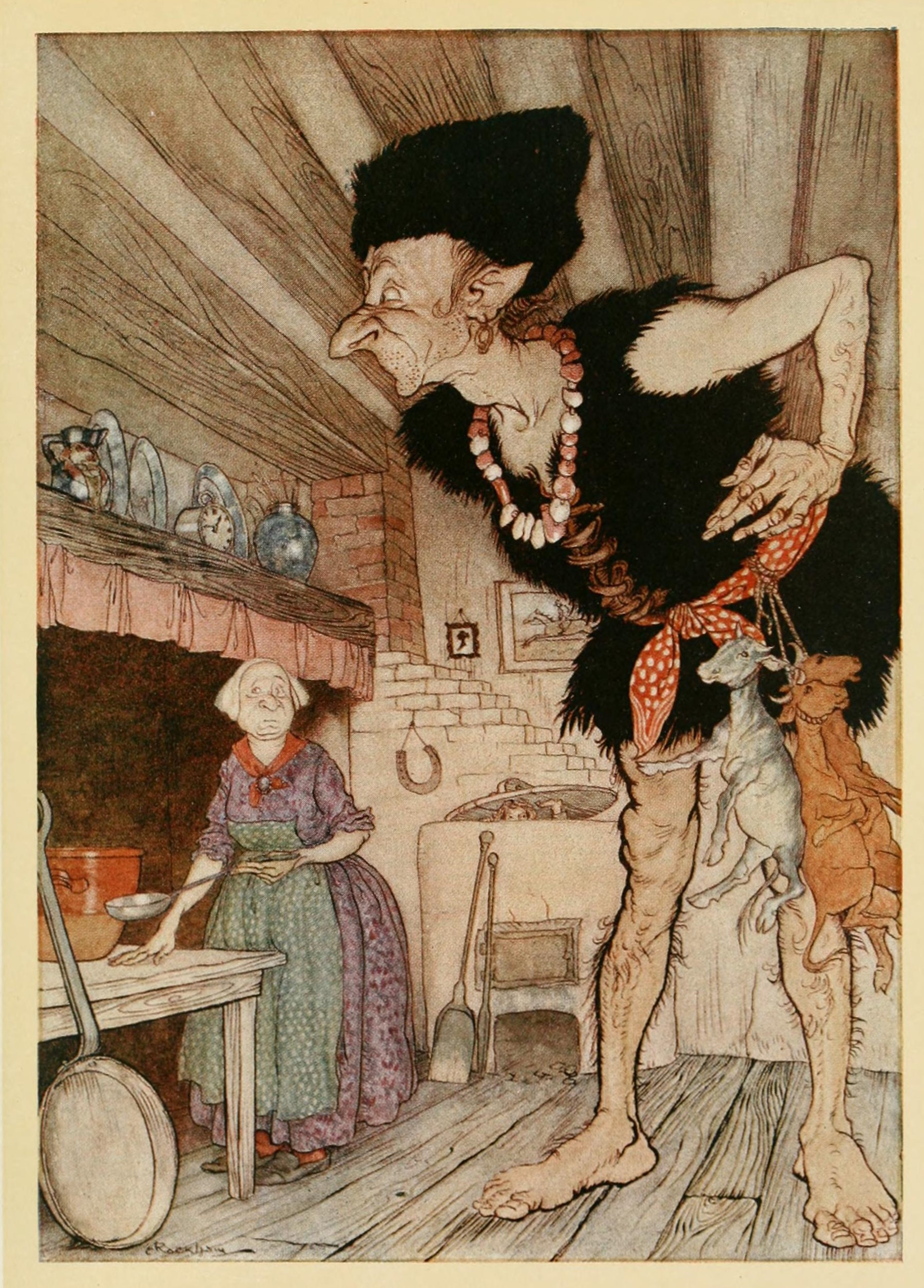
"Fee-fi-fo-fum, I smell the blood of an Englishman", illustration in the book

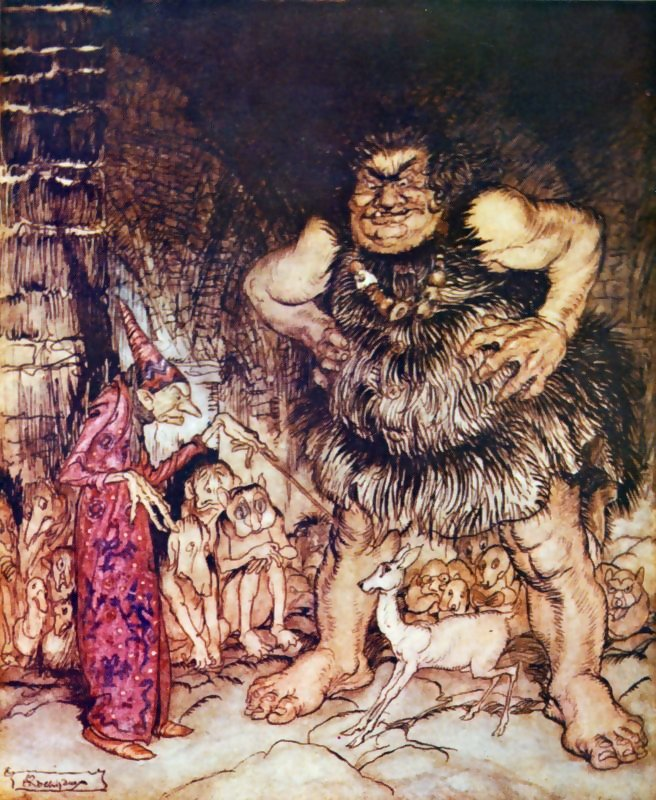
"The giant Galligantua and the wicked old magician transform the duke's daughter into a white hind", illustration in the book

English Fairy Tales is a book containing a collection of 41 fairy tales retold by Flora Annie Steel and published in 1918 by Macmillan and Co., Limited, London. It was illustrated by Arthur Rackham and entails a variety of fairy tales featuring mythical creatures, heroic figures, and moral lessons. The book explores themes including the struggle between good and evil and the importance of courage and intelligence. It provides readers with an insight into the realm of British folklore by offering a comprehensive collection of English folk narratives, thereby enhancing the accessibility of these stories for readers of the time and beyond. Originally, the tales featured in the book were primarily published in 1890 and 1894 by Joseph Jacobs.

== Context ==
Steel was a British author known for her contributions to literature, particularly in the field of Indian history and culture. One of her earlier works, Tales of the Punjab (1894), was a collection of folktales from the Punjab region of India. She compiled and retold these stories, offering readers a glimpse into the rich cultural heritage of the Indian subcontinent. In the preface of Tales of the Punjab, she explains the intention with which it was written. She aimed to engage the imagination of children while simultaneously providing a valuable source for adults studying folklore. This interest in collecting and preserving traditional tales is believed to have led to her publication of English Fairy Tales.

Most of the contents of English Fairy Tales by Steel drew from Joseph Jacobs' collections, specifically English Fairy Tales (1890) and More English Fairy Tales (1894). Notably, 37 of the tales featured in Steel's book also appeared in Jacobs' collections. Jacobs gathered these tales from a combination of written sources and oral traditions. In More English Fairy Tales, Jacobs describes certain tales within the collection as skillfully constructed pieces of nonsensical storytelling, intentionally put together to amuse children. He elaborates by noting that the presence of humor characterizes the English folk tradition.

The English folklore tradition developed over centuries mainly through storytelling and was later reflected in poetry and plays. These narratives represent a method to transmit knowledge and information from one generation to the next. Usually, fairy tales do not contain more than superficial references to actual places, people, and events and often begin with the timeless phrase "once upon a time". Tracing the origins of fairy tales is difficult as only their literary forms have endured, but researchers from the Universities of Durham and Lisbon suggest that some of these tales could possibly reach back thousands of years, possibly extending as far as the Bronze Age.

Published in 1918, during the period of the First World War, it is possible that Steel intended the book to serve as a source of comfort and distraction for readers. Fairy tales have historically been used as a form of escapism, allowing readers to immerse themselves in imaginative worlds and temporarily escape reality. This sense of escapism was heightened by the inclusion of illustrations by Arthur Rackham, who was an English book illustrator and a prominent figure during the Golden Age of British book illustration. This era lasted from 1890 to the onset of World War I and its emergence was fueled partly by the widespread popularity of illustrated books as Christmas gifts. Rackham significantly contributed to this period by providing illustrations for numerous Christmas books.

== Contents ==
The collection consists of a series of traditional folk tales and legends that were passed down through generations in England. It specifically features the British version of the fairy tales, thereby setting it apart from other renditions. The deliberate inclusion of British tales within the context of the book's publication during World War I hints at a theme of nationalism. This theme is evident from the very first tale, St. George of Merrie England. It follows the adventures of an English knight who embarks on a journey performing heroic deeds to save a princess from a dragon as one of the Six Champions of Christendom. The Six Champions include knights from France, Spain, Italy, and Wales, representing some of the countries that joined forces as the Allies of World War 1 to fight against Germany.

The following chapters feature commonly known tales that have been retold in various versions across a range of literary works, such as Jack and the Beanstalk, The Three Little Pigs, and Little Red Riding Hood. Throughout the book, the tales cover a wide range of themes and characters, including kings, queens, witches, talking animals, and magical objects. The book contains a total of 58 illustrations, with 16 color plates and 42 black and white illustrations by Arthur Rackham, complementing the narratives by bringing to life the magical world of the tales.

== Reception ==
English Fairy Tales has been translated into German, Japanese, Spanish, Chinese, Italian, and French. According to a review by The Bookman, "It would be difficult to find a more fascinating and artistically produced volume than the collection of English Fairy Tales retold by Mrs Flora Annie Steel [...]. It is a sumptuous feast and a gift that will be prized by all art-loving and imaginative children". English Fairy Tales has been published in numerous editions, including deluxe limited editions signed by Arthur Rackham. The inclusion of his illustrations was important for the book’s success and elevated its reception. In a review by The New York Tribune, Willis Fletcher Johnson wrote, "never shall we hope to see more perfect pictures of scenes in childhood's histories than these of Mr. Rackham's". Over a century after the publication, the Christmas editions continue to be sought after by collectors.

The high demand for fairy tale books was further facilitated by the emergence of many new publishing houses during the late 19th and early 20th centuries. Then the onset of World War I brought about inflation, leading to resource rationing and a shortage of paper, consequently leading to a reduced book production. The aftermath of the war, later coupled with the Great Depression, further exacerbated the situation, causing a decline in demand for both fairy tales and books in general. A few years later, fairy tales quickly gained popularity again. In 1937, Walt Disney, being aware of the public's desire for an escape from the turmoil of a war-torn and economically strained world, introduced an era of fairy tale movies. Later, in the aftermath of World War II, fairy tales became available in paperback format. Parents invested in these stories to both amuse their children and teach valuable lessons of hope, kindness, and good over evil. Fairy tales experienced widespread recognition for their dual role as both educational tools and sources of entertainment. Since the publication of English Fairy Tales by Steel in 1918, the topic of fairy tales has evolved and adapted to changing cultural and literary contexts. Over time, the fascination with fairy tales and folklore has endured, and subsequent generations have continued to find value in these traditional narratives. The perspectives on folklore, gender roles, and cultural representation have shifted, leading to numerous retellings and adaptations of the stories.

In total, Steel published about 30 books, some of which were translated into other languages. In the years after the publication of English Fairy Tales, she published more tale collections, fiction, as well as her autobiography. Examples of these works include: A Tale of Indian Heroes (1923), The Law of the Threshold (1924), The Curse of Eve (1929), and The Garden of Fidelity: Being the Autobiography of Flora Annie Steel 1847-1929. Rackham illustrated other fairy tale books, including The Allies' Fairy Book (1916), Cinderella (1919), The Sleeping Beauty (1920), Irish Fairy Tales (1920), and his fairy book, The Arthur Rackham Fairy Book (1933). He also illustrated operas by Wagner and plays by Shakespeare. By 1936, exhibitions showcasing Rackham’s work were held all over the world.
