= Westminster Budget =

The Westminster Budget was a British national newspaper from 1893 to 1904. Copies of the paper are available in the British Library newspaper collection under shelf mark MLD29.

Arthur Rackham worked for the paper as a reporter and illustrator from 1892.
