= Enid Starkie =

Irish literary critic (1897–1970)

- Born: Enid Mary Starkie; 18 August 1897; Killiney, Ireland
- Died: 21 April 1970 (aged 72); Walton Street, Oxford, England
- Occupation: Literary critic

Enid Mary Starkie CBE (18 August 1897 – 21 April 1970), was an Irish literary critic, known for her biographical works on French poets. She was a Fellow of Somerville College, Oxford, and Lecturer and then Reader in the University.

== Early life ==
Starkie was born in Killiney, County Dublin, Ireland. She was the eldest daughter of Rt. Hon. William Joseph Myles (WJM) Starkie (1860–1920) and May Caroline Walsh. The academic Walter Starkie was her brother. The artist Edyth Starkie was her aunt. When she was two years of age her father accepted the post of Resident Commissioner of Education for Ireland. In Edwardian Dublin her upbringing was steeped in studies. Her father hired a French governess, Leonie Cora, to tutor his children in French and music. The children became imbued with everything French, from cooking to Le Printemps catalogues. Enid wrote, "My French governess never stopped talking of France, and she talked with all the nostalgia of the exile." Mlle. Cora had been a pupil of the French pianist and composer Raoul Pugno, and Enid learnt to play the piano, going on to win second medal for two years in succession at Feis Ceoil, the annual music festival in Dublin. She was educated at Alexandra College in Dublin, Somerville College at the University of Oxford, and the Sorbonne in Paris.

== Oxford ==
Starkie read Modern Languages at Oxford and obtained a First in 1920. She taught modern languages at Exeter and then in the Faculty of Medieval and Modern Languages, University of Oxford. Her biography of Baudelaire (1933) was for many English readers their first introduction to the poet. She wrote perceptively on André Gide (1953), securing him an honorary doctorate at Oxford in 1947. She also played a major part in establishing the poetic reputation of Arthur Rimbaud (1938), receiving the first doctorate to be given in the Faculty of Modern Languages for her work Rimbaud in Abyssinia. She published two major volumes on Flaubert (1967, 1971). In 1951 she campaigned successfully to have the quinquennially elected Professor of Poetry at Oxford be a practising poet rather than a critic. She argued that "the Chair ought to go to someone outside the University, to someone who would not otherwise be heard in Oxford. There were enough people already engaged in talking about poetry as critics, indeed too many." C. S. Lewis was defeated by Cecil Day-Lewis in the first subsequent election. She also campaigned successfully for W. H. Auden (1956), Robert Graves (1961), and Edmund Blunden (1966) in subsequent elections for the Chair, leading one critic to complain that, "This was a serious academic affair until Dr. Starkie turned it into something like the Oxford and Cambridge boat race." She also secured an honorary doctorate for Jean Cocteau in 1956.

She was honoured as an officer of the Legion d'honneur in 1958, and as a Commander of the Order of the British Empire in 1967. Many people regarded her as eccentric. An article in Time magazine portrayed her as "a brilliant Rimbaud scholar who pub-crawls about Oxford in bright red slacks and beret while smoking cigars." Francis Steegmuller wrote, "One of the things I most enjoyed about her was her true eccentricity, in a world where false eccentricity has become a kind of conformity. My wife is the novelist, Shirley Hazzard, and I always wonder when Enid will appear in one of her books."

== Works ==
- Les sources du lyrisme dans la poésie d'Emile Verhaeren (1927)
- Baudelaire (1933)
- Rimbaud en Abyssinie (1933)
- Arthur Rimbaud in Abyssinia (1937)
- Arthur Rimbaud (1938) revised twice
- A Lady's Child (1941) autobiography
- Petrus Borel en Algérie (1950); (written in French)
- The French Mind: Studies in Honour of Gustave Rudler (1952); editor with Will Moore and Rhoda Sutherland
- André Gide (1953)
- Petrus Borel: The Lycanthrope (1954)
- Three Studies in Modern French Literature (Proust, Gide, Mauriac) (1960); with J. M. Cocking and Martin Jarrett-Kerr
- Arthur Rimbaud (1961) the final revision, a complete re-evaluation based on newly discovered materials. A New Directions book
- From Gautier to Eliot: 1851–1939; the Influence of France on English Literature (1962)
- Flaubert: The Making of the Master (1967)
- Flaubert the Master: A Critical and Biographical Study, 1856-1880 (1971)
