= Alexander Anderson (physicist) =

Irish physicist and university president

Alexander Anderson (12 May 1858 – 7 September 1936) was an Irish physicist and President of Queen's College Galway, now the University of Galway, from 1899 until 1934. In electrical engineering he is known for Anderson's bridge. He is credited with being the first physicist to consider black holes as real physical entities, in a 1920 paper.

== Early life and education ==
Alexander Anderson was born on 12 May 1858, the son of Daniel Anderson, of Camus, Coleraine, County Londonderry. He was educated at Queen's College Galway, where he won a first-year scholarship in the Science Division of the Faculty of Arts and the Sir Robert Peel Prize in Geometry in 1876. He was awarded gold medals on the results of his B.A. examination in 1880, and his M.A. examination in 1881. He then won first place in an open examination for a scholarship to Sidney Sussex College at Cambridge from which he graduated BA (6th wrangler) in 1884. He was later awarded MA in 1888.

== Career ==
In 1885, Anderson returned to Queen's College Galway, where he was appointed Professor of Natural Philosophy, a post he held until 1934. He was elected a Fellow of the Royal University of Ireland in 1886, and a Fellow of Sidney Sussex College, Cambridge, in 1891. He was appointed President of Queen's College Galway on the resignation of Professor W. J. M. Starkie in 1899.

Anderson was conferred with an honorary LL.D. by the University of Glasgow in 1901. He served as a Senator of both the Royal University of Ireland, and its successor, the National University of Ireland, and as a member of the Dublin Commissioners appointed under the Irish Universities Act 1908. He was Vice-Chancellor of the National University of Ireland in 1915 and 1920.

He retired as President of the College in 1934, and died in September 1936.

== Personal life ==
Anderson married Miss Emily Binns, of Galway. His daughter, Emily Anderson, was a Professor of German, music historian and noted cryptanalyst.

Academic offices
| Preceded by W. J. M. Starkie | President of Queen's College Galway; 1899–1934 | Succeeded by John Hynes |
