= Rhoda Sutherland =

British academic (1907–1989)

- Born: Rhoda Clarke; 1907; Atherstone, Warwickshire, England
- Died: 6 January 1989 (aged 81–82)

Rhoda Sutherland (1907 – 6 January 1989) was an academic who studied the French language and specialised in Old French and Old Provencal.

== Life ==
Rhoda Clarke was born in Atherstone in 1907 and attended Nuneaton School for Girls. In 1929 she was Lecturer and in 1935 Fellow of Lady Margaret Hall in Oxford University. She studied the French language and was quoted for her views on the history of the language. Sutherland lectured on Philology which was a subject she defended against those who would like to have seen its scope subsumed into Literary Studies. The American Chinese studies academic Richard Baum credited Sutherland with inspiring him to specialise in linguistics.

In 1938 she married the Oxford librarian Donald Sutherland. She retired in 1971 and died in 1989.

== Work ==
- (with Will Moore and Enid Starkie) The French Mind. Studies in honour of Gustave Rudler, Oxford 1952
- The language of the troubadours, in: French Studies 10, 1956, S. 199-215
- The love meditation in courtly literature, in: Studies in medieval French. Presented to Alfred Ewert in honour of his seventieth birthday, Oxford 1961, S. 165-193
