= Edyth Starkie =

Edyth Starkie (27 November 1867 – March 1941) was an established Irish portrait painter who was married to Arthur Rackham. She was born on the west coast of Ireland at Westcliff House, County Galway.

== Life and career ==
=== Early life ===
The youngest of six, she spent most of her youth at Creggane Manor, Rosscarbery, near Cork where her father, William Robert Starkie JP (1824–1897), was a resident magistrate, who had also taught himself to play the violin. Her youthful behavior was said to be so wild and outrageous that at Mass in Skibbereen the parish priest denounced her, along with her cousin Fanny, from the pulpit.

In 1883, at the age of sixteen, she set off with her mother (Frances Maria Starkie) for London. There, Edyth enrolled at the Slade School, one of Europe's most progressive art schools. In 1884, she moved to Paris to study art at the Académie Julian under Jules Joseph Lefebvre and Tony Robert-Fleury. She then continued her studies in Germany, where one of her brothers, Rex, was an officer in the German Army. In Cassel, Edyth became engaged to a Prussian officer, Colonel von W-, at Potsdam, causing a major scandal when she finally broke it off because she couldn't stand the stiff Prussian attitudes; her fiancé would insist on challenging any man whom Edyth so much as smiled at in the street to a duel. Edyth and her mother finally returned to London in 1895.

=== Arthur Rackham ===
Edyth and Arthur met in Hampstead as artists in the 1890s, and were engaged in 1901. Arthur, a member of the Royal Watercolour Society (RWS), was afraid other members might mock his fantasy pictures in the company of more traditional watercolorists at RWS exhibitions. Edyth persuaded him to put Grimm and Morte D'Arthur into the Winter RWS Exhibition of 1902, which were very well received. She did much to encourage his fantasy drawings at the beginning of his career. She was always his most stimulating, severest critic, and he had the greatest respect for her opinion. They were married on 26 July 1903 at St. Mark's, Hampstead, and honeymooned in North Wales. Their daughter, Barbara, was born in January 1908.

Their personalities: Edyth was quizzical, ironic, and imaginative like the Irish; Arthur was prim, precise, and very English in manner. Edyth was full of mischief and always did her best to shock her husband. Barbara later wrote about her mother, "I don't think she was conventionally beautiful, but people instantly felt that she was... she made people laugh without ever saying anything particularly witty, and could give great comfort without much useful advice. Servants and tradesmen adored her, and she only had to paint a room a certain colour for her friends to want to copy it." Edyth and Arthur had a happy marriage.

Arthur remained inspired by his wife throughout his life. His studio was filled with his Edyth's paintings. In his illustration The Three Bears, he included Edyth's painting The Grebe Hat on the wall of the bears' dining room. And when journalist Eleanor Farjeon was writing an article on Arthur, he asked that she include more about Edyth.

== Achievements ==
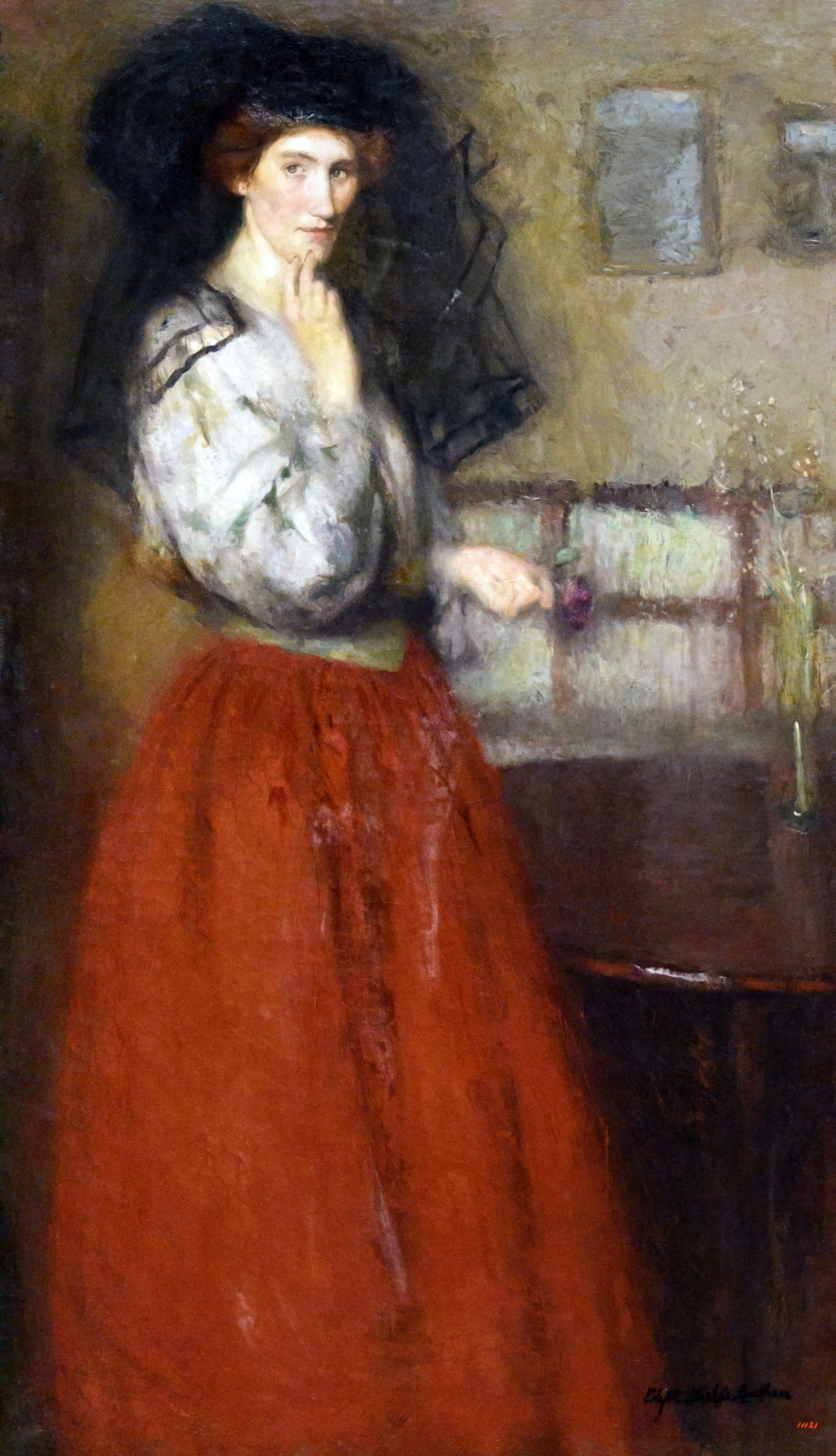
The Black Veil (National Museum, Barcelona)

Starkie was a member of the International Society; her exhibitions at the Royal Academy of Arts in London included Lilla (1897), St. Cecilia (1898), and Pippa Passes (1899).

Her works were purchased for the National Museum, Barcelona, where she had won a gold medal at the Barcelona International Exposition in 1911 for her painting The Black Veil. The Musée du Luxembourg in Paris purchased her painting, The Spotted Dress, in 1913.

The Luxembourg collection has since moved to the Musée d'Orsay.

== Notable family members ==
Her older brother was the Greek scholar and last Resident Commissioner of National Education for Ireland under British Rule, W.J.M. Starkie. Her nephew was the scholar Walter Starkie and her niece, Enid Starkie was known for her biographies of French poets.

== Sources ==
- James Hamilton,"Edyth Starkie", Irish Arts Review Yearbook (1991–1992).
