= Jack Hynes =

Jack Hynes may refer to:

- Jack Hynes (newscaster) (1929–2018), American newscaster based in Boston
- Jack Hynes (soccer) (1920–2013), Scottish-born American soccer player

== See also ==
- John Hynes (disambiguation)
