= Richard Baum =

American sinologist

- Born: July 8, 1940
- Died: December 14, 2012 (aged 72)
- Education: University of California, Los Angeles (BA); University of California, Berkeley (MA, PhD)
- Scientific career
- Fields: Political science Sinology
- Thesis: Revolution and reaction in rural China: the struggle between two roads during the socialist education movement (1962–1966) and the great proletarian cultural revolution (1966–1968) (1970)
- Doctoral advisor: Robert A. Scalapino

Richard Dennis Baum (Chinese: 包瑞嘉; pinyin: Bāo Ruìjiā; July 8, 1940 – December 14, 2012) was an American sinologist and China watcher. He was a professor of political science at the University of California, Los Angeles (UCLA), where he directed the UCLA Center for Chinese studies. He was noted for his many academic works on Chinese politics. Baum credited Rhoda Sutherland of Oxford University with inspiring his interest in linguistics.

== Early life ==
Baum graduated from the University of California, Los Angeles, with a B.A. in political science in 1962. He then earned an M.A. in political science in 1963 and his Ph.D. in political science in 1970 from the University of California, Berkeley.

== Fang Lizhi incident ==
On February 20, 1989, Baum and fellow scholars Harry Harding, Larry Krause, and Michel Oksenberg met with George H. W. Bush, then incoming ambassador to China James Lilley, and others to brief the president on U.S.-China relations.

As discussion turned to human rights, Baum advised that it would not be wise to single out specific Chinese dissidents to bring the issue to the fore and that it would be better to talk about human rights in the most general terms possible. He specifically used Fang Lizhi as an example of a dissident that should not be singled out as Deng Xiaoping harbored strong personal feelings against him and specifically mentioning him would likely be seen as an affront to Deng.

Baum was then informed by Lilley during their break from the briefing that Fang had already been invited to a banquet in Beijing the following Sunday February 26, which was not public information at the time. Baum believed this was a great diplomatic misstep and nothing positive could result from it. He talked with his friend and Los Angeles Times correspondent James Mann about this, unintentionally leaking the information, and the next morning the information appeared on the front page of the Los Angeles Times with the headline Bush, on China Trip, to See Dissidents, Sources Say.

On the evening of the banquet, Fang's name card was placed somewhere as inconspicuous as possible, however Fang never made it to the banquet. The leaked information made its way to China, and Fang, Perry Link, and their wives while driving to the banquet were forced off the road by Chinese security police. They then walked to the hotel where the banquet was being held but were not permitted to enter.

The incident led to increased tensions in U.S.-China relations and greater antipathy toward Fang Lizhi, who Beijing would later name the country's most wanted counterrevolutionary criminal leading to Fang's year-long sanctuary at the U.S. embassy.

== Publications ==
- Ssu-Ch'ing: The Socialist Education Movement of 1962–66 (co-written with Frederick C. Teiwes; U.C. Berkeley, Center for Chinese Studies, 1968)
- China in Ferment: Perspectives on the Cultural Revolution (Prentice-Hall, 1972)
- Prelude to Revolution: Mao, the Party, and the Peasant Question, 1962–1966 (Columbia University Press, 1975)
- China's Four Modernizations: The New Technological Revolution (Westview Press, 1980)
- Reform and Reaction in Post-Mao China: The Road to Tiananmen (Routledge, 1991)
- Burying Mao: Chinese Politics in the Age of Deng Xiaoping (Princeton University Press, 1996)
- China Watcher: Confessions of a Peking Tom (University of Washington Press, 2010) (partial digitization)
- The Fall and Rise of China (A series of 48 lectures on DVD, The Teaching Company, 2010)

== See also ==
- Michel Oksenberg
- Sidney Rittenberg
- Deng Pufang
