= William Brown Macdougall =

Scottish artist (1868–1936)

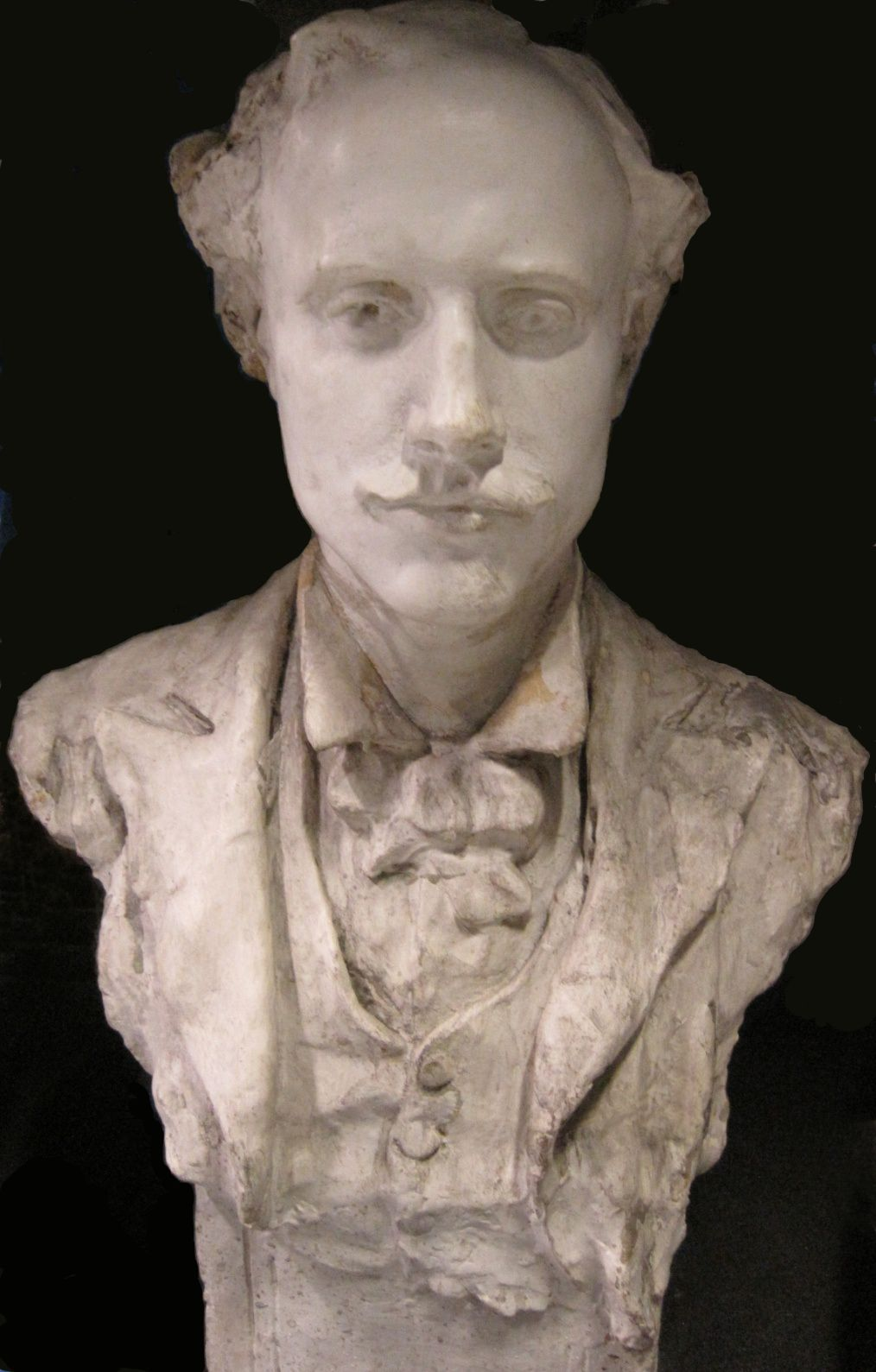
William Brown Macdougall by Frank Mowbray Taubman

William Brown Macdougall (16 December 1868 – 20 April 1936) was a Scottish artist, wood engraver, etcher and book illustrator.

== Biography ==
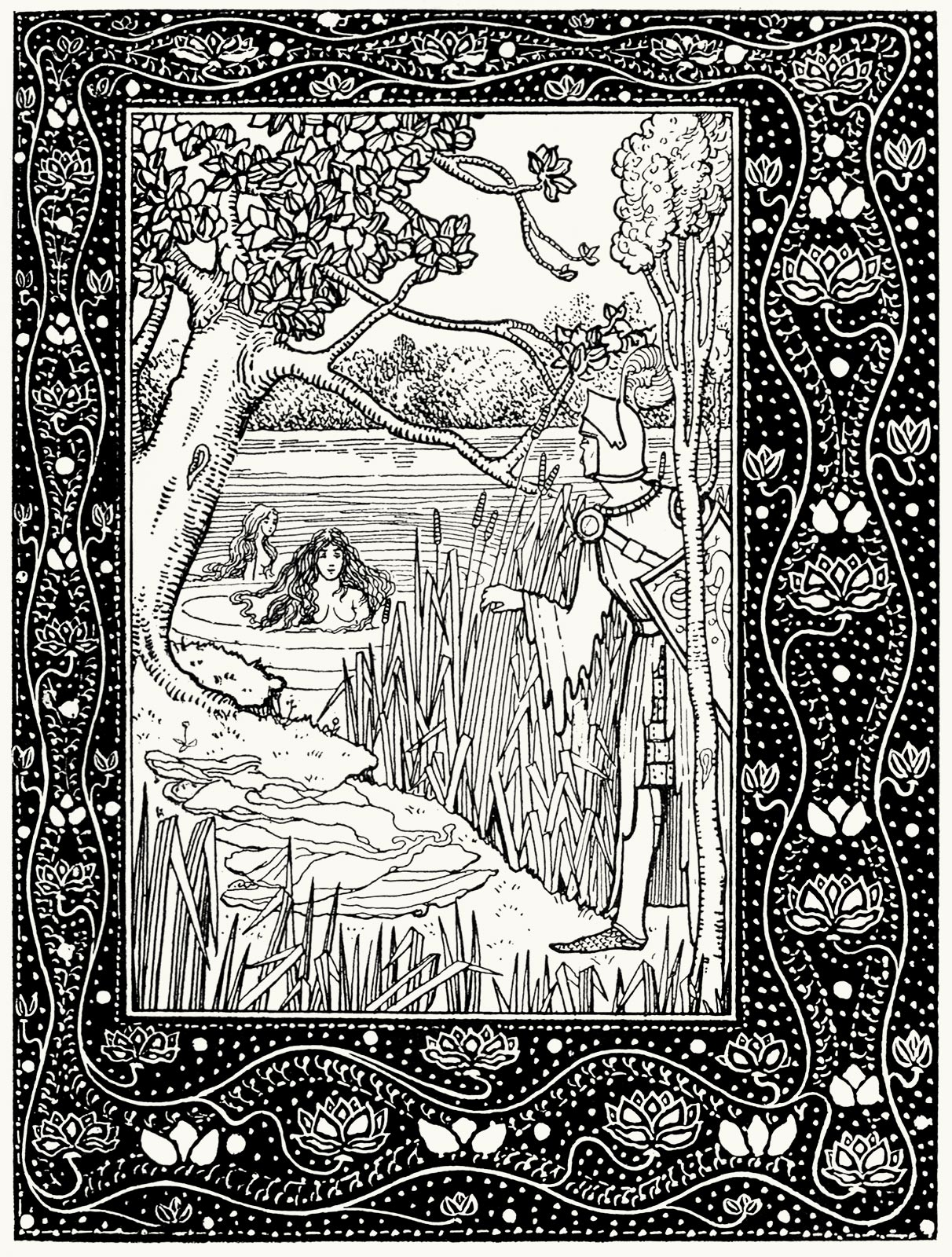
"Hagen and the Mermaids" from "The Fall of the Nibelungs" by Margaret Armour

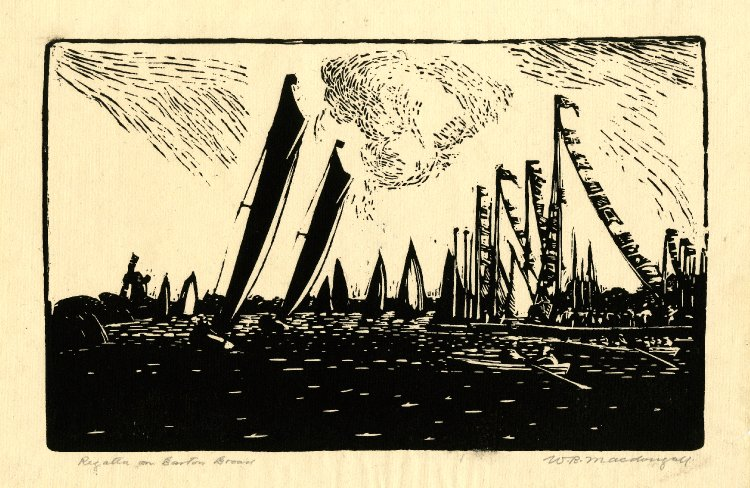
"Regatta on Barton Broad"

Macdougall was born in Glasgow on 16 December 1868. He was married to Margaret Armour, the translator, poet and playwright. They collaborated with Aubrey Beardsley on many projects and were members of the prestigious New English Art Club. The couple lived in the Uplands, Loughton, and then for many years at Debden Green, Loughton in Essex, home at the time of a noted artistic and scientific community, where a Blue Plaque commemorating them was unveiled in 2012.

Macdougall received his art education at the Glasgow Academy and at the Académie Julian in Paris, also working in the studios of Bouguereau, Jean-Paul Laurens and Tony Robert-Fleury, and becoming a member of the Salon des Artistes Français. He contributed to The Yellow Book, The Evergreen, and The Savoy in the 1890s. His work tended to be somewhat sombre and was clearly influenced by Aubrey Beardsley and William Morris. He provided a frontispiece portrait of Robert Louis Stevenson for Margaret's first book, and illustrations for her books of poetry as well as her translations from medieval German. He only illustrated for a very brief period between 1896 and 1898, but contributed greatly to this form of art – his decorative vignettes seen in "The Fall of the Nibelungs", "Isabella, or the Pot of Basil" and "The Blessed Damozel" owe much to Art Nouveau and Arts and Crafts Movement motifs.

He died on 20 April 1936 in Loughton. After William's death Margaret returned to Edinburgh, where she died in 1943.

== Legacy ==
Macdougall also painted in oils and other mediums.

His work was exhibited at the Royal Academy and Royal Scottish Academy in 1888, 1928 and 1929, at the New English Art Club, Royal Glasgow Institute of the Fine Arts in 1927, Walker Art Gallery, Liverpool, Manchester City Art Gallery and the Paris Salon. William’s sister Agnes donated 6 prints and a plaster bust of William done by Frank Mowbray Taubman while they were both students in Paris in the late 1890s to The Kelvingrove Art Gallery in Glasgow.

The British Museum has a collection of 21 prints by Macdougall and other works are held by galleries throughout the UK.

There is an illustrated article with bibliography on him in the Imaginative Illustration Society's Studies in Illustration no.84 Summer 2023

== Illustrated books ==
- The Home and Early Haunts of Robert Louis Stevenson Margaret Armour and William Brown Macdougall
- The Book of Ruth William Brown Macdougall (1896)
- Chronicles of Strathearn William Brown Macdougall (1896)
- Thames Sonnets and Semblances Margaret Armour, William Brown Macdougall (1897)
- The Fall of the Nibelungs Margaret Armour and William Brown Macdougall (1897)
- The Eerie Book Margaret Armour and William Brown Macdougall (1898)
- Isabella, or The Pot of Basil John Keats, William Brown Macdougall (1898)
- The Shadow of Love, and other poems ... Margaret Armour and William Brown Macdougall (1898)
- Rubáiyát of Omar Khayyám Edward FitzGerald, William Brown Macdougall (1898)
- The Blessed Damozel Dante Gabriel Rossetti, William Brown Macdougall and William Michael Rossetti (1898)
- Gudrun Margaret Armour and William Brown Macdougall (1928)
- The Fields of France Agnes Mary Francis Robinson and William Brown Macdougall (1905)
- (see Internet Archive)
