= Fee-fi-fo-fum =

Historical quatrain

"Fee-fi-fo-fum" is the first line of a historical quatrain (or sometimes couplet) famous for its use in the classic English fairy tale "Jack and the Beanstalk". The poem, as given in Joseph Jacobs' 1890 rendition, is as follows:

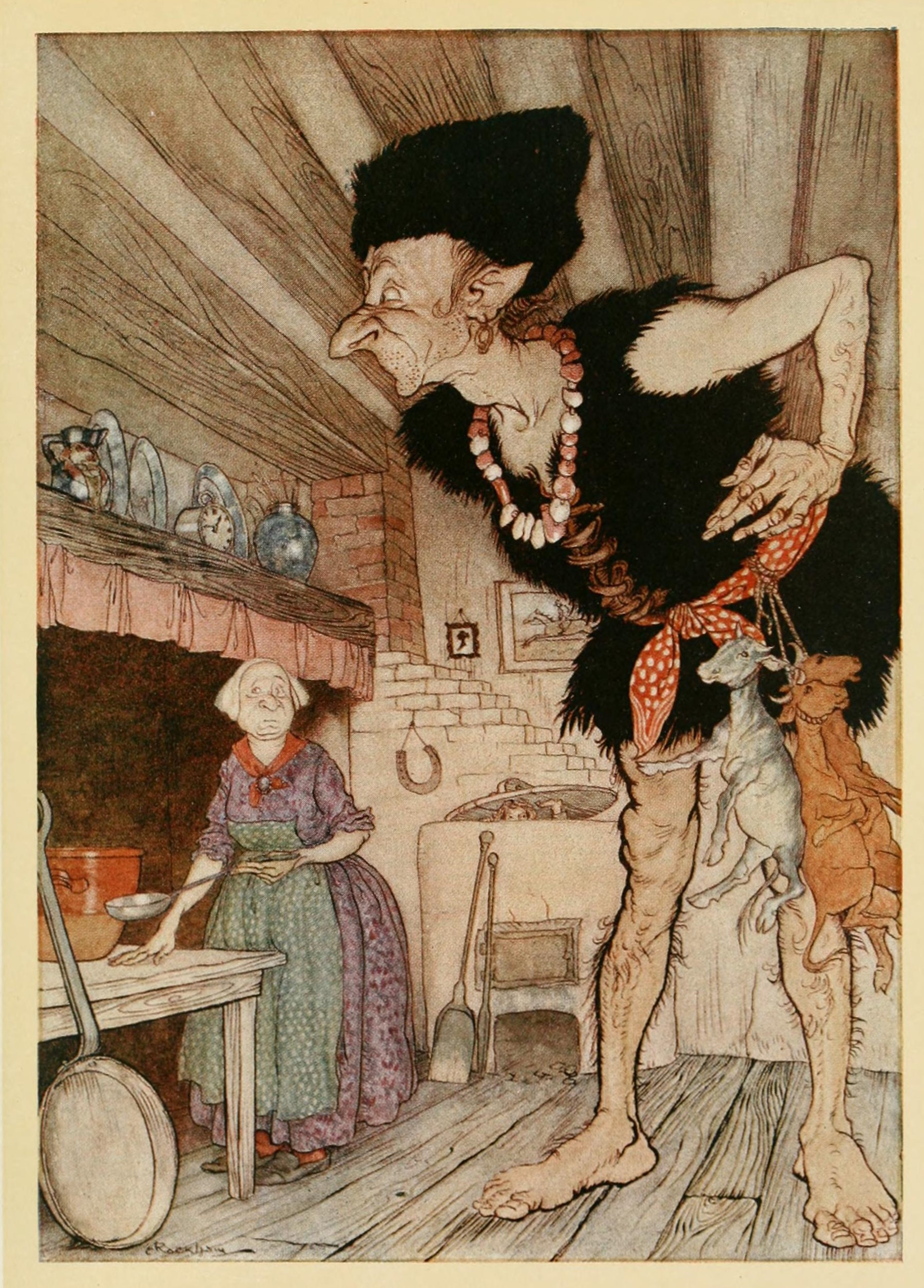
Illustration by Arthur Rackham in English Fairy Tales by Flora Annie Steel, 1918

Fee-fi-fo-fum,
I smell the blood of an Englishman,
Be he alive, or be he dead
I'll have his bones to grind my bread.

== Analysis ==
Though the Jacobs' rhyme is tetrametric, it follows no consistent metrical foot; However, the lines correspond roughly to a monosyllabic tetrameter, a dactylic tetrameter, a trochaic tetrameter, and an iambic tetrameter respectively. The poem has historically made use of assonant half rhyme.

The line's effectiveness derives in part from vowel melody. The successive vowels when pronouncing the phrase cause a sudden shifting from the unrounded high-front to the rounded low-back position. This, combined with lowering the pitch, creates the sense of humor that the vowel sequence frequently invokes (compare the phrase "see-saw," for example). This is especially clear in the early phrase "fee fa fum—" though part of its humor may be attributed to the connection to "hee haw—" the sound of a donkey.

== Origin ==
The earliest form of the rhyme appears in The Old Wives' Tale, a play by George Peele first printed in 1595:

Fee, fa, fum,
Here is the Englishman,

The rhyme appears in the 1596 pamphlet "Haue with You to Saffron-Walden" written by Thomas Nashe, who mentions that the rhyme was already old and its origins obscure:

Fy, Fa and fum,
I smell the blood of an Englishman

In William Shakespeare's play King Lear (c. 1605), in Act III, Scene IV, the character Edgar referring to the legend of Childe Rowland exclaims:

Fie, foh, and fum,
I smell the blood of a British man.

The verse in King Lear makes use of the archaic word "fie", used to express disapproval. This word is used repeatedly in Shakespeare's works: King Lear shouts, "Fie, fie, fie! pah, pah!", and in Antony and Cleopatra, Mark Antony exclaims, "O fie, fie, fie!"

The earliest known printed version of the Jack the Giant-Killer tale appears in The history of Jack and the Giants (Newcastle, 1711) and this, and later versions (found in chapbooks), include renditions of the poem, recited by the giant Thunderdell:

Fee, fau, fum,
I smell the blood of an English man,
Be alive, or be he dead,
I'll grind his bones to make my bread.

Fe, Fi, Fo, Fum.
I smell the blood of an Englishman,
Be he living, or be he dead,
I’ll grind his bones to mix my bread.

19th-century author Charles Mackay proposed in The Gaelic Etymology of the Languages of Western Europe (1877) that the seemingly meaningless string of syllables "Fa fe fi fo fum" is actually a coherent phrase of ancient Gaelic, and that the complete quatrain covertly expresses the Celts' cultural detestation of the invading Angles and Saxons:

- Fa from faich (fa!) "behold!" or "see!"
- Fe from Fiadh (fee-a) "food";
- Fi from fiú "good to eat"
- Fo from fogh (fó) "sufficient" and
- Fum from feum "hunger".

Thus "Fa fe fi fo fum!" becomes "Behold food, good to eat, sufficient for my hunger!"

== See also ==
- Fee, Fi, Fo, Fum, and Phooey, five mice who traveled to and circled the Moon on Apollo 17 in 1972, four nicknamed after the poem
- Ablaut reduplication
- Baba Yaga, in Slavic folklore, also detects human presence by smell
