= Margaret Armour =

Scottish poet, novelist and translator

Margaret Armour (10 September 1860 – 13 October 1943) was a Scottish poet, novelist, and translator. In 1895 Armour married William Brown MacDougall. She translated the Nibelungenlied from Middle High German into English prose, first published in 1897 as The Fall of the Nibelungs. In 1910 she translated The Ring of the Nibelung by Richard Wagner, and in 1928 she translated Gudrun.

== Selected works ==
=== Anthology ===
- The Eerie Book (1898) London: Shiells. Ed. Margaret Armour. Illust. William Brown Macdougall. Retrieved 3 February 2026 – via Internet Archive.

=== Prose ===
- The Home and Early Haunts of Robert Louis Stevenson (1895)
- Agnes of Edinburgh (1910)

=== Poetry ===
- Songs of Love and Death (1896)
- Thames Sonnets and Semblances (1897)
- The Shadow of Love and Other Poems (1898)

=== Translations ===
- Heine, Heinrich (1891–1905). The works of Heinrich Heine. Translated by Leland, Charles Godfrey; Brooksbank, Thomas; Armour, Margaret. London: W Heinemann – via Internet Archive. (Armour translated vols. 10–12.)
- Wagner, Richard (1910). The Rhinegold and the Valkyrie (the Ring of the Niblung). Translated by Armour Margaret, illustrated by Arthur Rackham, Margaret. London: William Heinemann. ISBN 9781473319257.
- Wagner, Richard (1911). Siegfried and The Twilight of the Gods (the Ring of the Niblung). Translated by Armour Margaret. London: William Heinemann. ISBN 9781473319257.
- The Nibelungenlied – A Prose Translation. Translated by Armour, Margaret. London: JM Dent. 1934 [c. 1200].
- Legerlotz, Gustav (1932). Gudrun. Translated by Armour, Margaret. London: JM Dent. ASIN B0013IT7ZM.
