= John Hynes (priest) =

Irish priest and archaeologist

- Born: 4 January 1875
- Died: 8 January 1949 (aged 74)
- Education: Divinity Degree, Masters
- Alma mater: St. Patrick's College, Maynooth; National University of Ireland
- Occupations: Priest, Archaeologist
- Employer(s): University College, Galway
- Title: President of University College, Galway
- Term: 1934–1945
- Predecessor: Alexander Anderson
- Successor: Pádraig de Brún

John Hynes (4 January 1875 – 8 January 1949) was a professor of archaeology, who served as President of University College, Galway from 1934 until 1945. Hynes was educated at St. Patrick's College, Maynooth earning a Divinity Degree, and was ordained to the priesthood, he also gained a masters from the National University of Ireland in 1922. He was appointed to University College Galway where he served as Registrar and Professor of Archaeology before becoming, President of the college in 1934. He also served on the Senate of the NUI, and as Vice-chancellor. Hynes was awarded an honorary LLD by the National University of Ireland in 1941.

Academic offices
| Preceded by Alexander Anderson | President of University College Galway; 1934–1945 | Succeeded by Pádraig de Brún |
