= Charles Finn =

Charles Finn may refer to:

- Charles Finn (water polo), American water polo player
- Charles C. Finn, American poet
- Charles A. Finn, priest of the Archdiocese of Boston
- Charlie Finn, American actor

== See also ==
- Chuck Finn, an Australian children's fantasy television series
