= Michael Hogan (Gaelic footballer) =

Irish Gaelic footballer

Personal information
- Native name: Mícheál Ó hÓgáin (Irish)
- Born: 27 October 1896 County Tipperary, Ireland
- Died: 21 November 1920 (aged 24) Croke Park, Dublin, Ireland

Sport
- Sport: Football
- Position: Right Full Back
Club
- Years: Club
- Grangemockler
Inter-county
- Years: County
- 1910s–1920: Tipperary

Michael Hogan (27 October 1896 – 21 November 1920) was a Gaelic footballer and one-time Captain of the Tipperary county team. He was a member of the Irish Volunteers and was born in the Grangemockler area of County Tipperary. He was the only player shot dead (along with 13 spectators) by the Royal Irish Constabulary at Croke Park on Bloody Sunday during the Irish War of Independence. The Hogan Stand at Croke Park is named in his memory.

== Bloody Sunday ==
Hogan took part in a challenge match between Tipperary and Dublin at Croke Park on Bloody Sunday, 21 November 1920. The day before, he travelled on the train with the other members of the team. A number of the players, including Hogan, became involved in a fight with soldiers from the Lincolnshire Regiment before throwing them from the train. On arrival at (Kingsbridge) Heuston Station, they quickly went their separate ways anticipating arrest. Michael and Thomas Ryan, the two IRA members on the team, decided to stay at Philip Shanahan's pub in Monto that night, rather than Barry's Hotel as planned. There they learned that 'there was a 'big job coming off' the following day, but were unaware of the details. The following morning, Phil Shanahan informed them of the shooting of British agents. Ryan claims that Dan Breen advised them it would be better not to attend the match, but instead to return to Tipperary. During the match, Black and Tans entered Croke Park and opened fire on the crowd. Hogan was one of the 14 people killed. Tom Ryan, a young spectator from Wexford, entered the pitch to pray beside the dying Hogan and was also fatally shot. Another player, Jim Egan, was wounded, but survived.

The Hogan Stand at Croke Park, built in 1924, is named in his memory.

== Personal life ==
Hogan was the brother of Major General Daniel (Dan) Hogan, who was Chief of Staff of the Defence Forces in the 1920s. His family were close friends of the Browne family, also from Grangemockler, that included the late Cardinal Michael Browne, Monsignor Maurice Browne (aka Joseph Brady), and Monsignor Pádraig de Brún, who later wrote that "he had identified Mick Hogan at the military inquiry to spare his brother Tom the ordeal."

Hogan's other brother was Brother Thomas Hogan, a Christian Brother. Brother Hogan was a significant promoter of Gaelic Games in his various teaching roles – in particular at Coláiste Mhuire, Mullingar in Mullingar. He also gave input to the local club teams in the town. The trophy for the All-Ireland Post-Primary Schools Gaelic Football is known as the Hogan Cup in his honour.
