= Thomas Joseph Riley =

American prelate

His Excellency, The Most Reverend Thomas Joseph Riley
- Auxiliary Bishop of Boston; Titular Bishop of Regiae
- Church: Catholic Church
- Archdiocese: Boston

Orders
- Ordination: May 20, 1927 by William Henry O’Connell
- Consecration: December 21, 1959 by Richard Cushing

Personal details
- Born: November 30, 1900 Waltham, Massachusetts, US
- Died: August 17, 1977 (aged 76) Kennebunk, Maine, US
- Education: Boston College; St. John's Seminary; Catholic University of Louvain
- Motto: Christus sapientia mea (Christ is my wisdom)

Thomas Joseph Riley (November 30, 1900 – August 17, 1977) was an American prelate of the Roman Catholic Church. He served as an auxiliary bishop of the Archdiocese of Boston in Massachusetts from 1959 to 1976.

== Biography ==
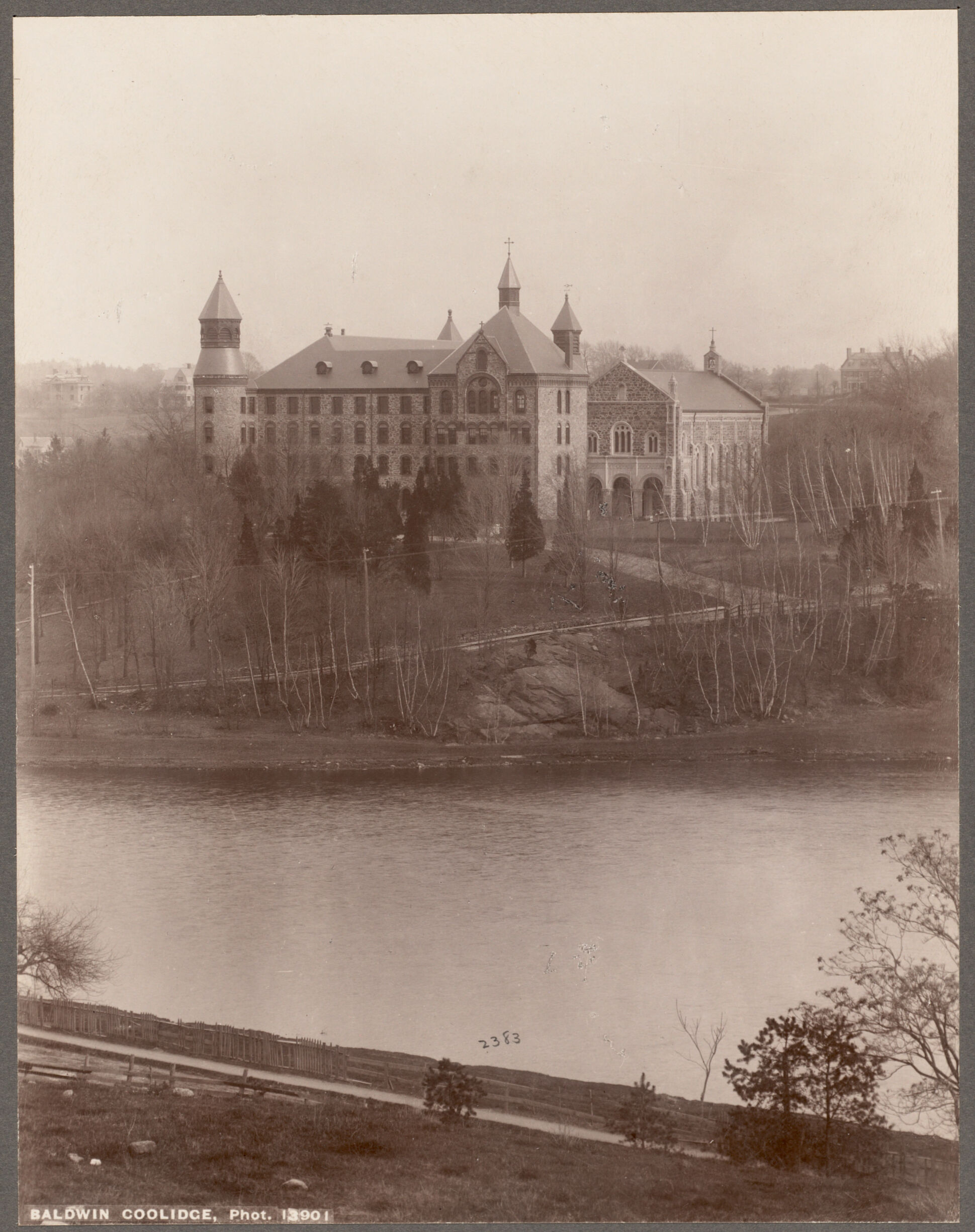
St. John Seminary, Boston, Massachusetts (1911)

=== Early life ===
Thomas Riley was born on November 30, 1900, in Waltham, Massachusetts, to Thomas and Agatha (née Loughry) Riley. Following his graduation from Boston College in 1922, he studied at St. John's Seminary in Boston.

=== Priesthood ===
Riley was ordained to the priesthood in Boston for the Archdiocese of Boston in Boston by Cardinal William Henry O’Connell on May 20, 1927. After his ordination, the archdiocese in 1929 assigned Riley as a curate at St. Joseph's Parish in Boston. He traveled to Belgium in 1931 to attend the Catholic University of Louvain in Leuven, where he earned a Doctor of Philosophy in 1933.

After returning to Massachusetts, Riley was appointed to the faculty of St. John's Seminary, where he taught philosophy and moral theology. He was named vice-rector of St. John's in 1944 and rector in 1951. In 1958, the archdiocese assigned Riley as pastor of St. Peter's Parish in Cambridge, Massachusetts.

=== Auxiliary Bishop of Boston ===
On November 4, 1959, Riley was appointed auxiliary bishop of Boston and titular bishop of Regiae by Pope Pius XII. He received his episcopal consecration on December 21, 1959, from Cardinal Richard Cushing at the Cathedral of the Holy Cross in Boston, with Bishops Eric Francis MacKenzie and Jeremiah Francis Minihan serving as co-consecrators. In addition to his episcopal duties, he continued to serve as pastor of St. Peter's Parish.

Riley was the author of a weekly column in the archdiocesan newspaper, The Pilot, that was called "Theology for the Everyman". He was also a member of the Massachusetts Obscene Literature Control Commission.

=== Retirement and death ===
After reaching the mandatory retirement age of 75, he retired as auxiliary bishop of Boston on June 28, 1976. He died on August 17, 1977, at his brother's cottage in Kennebunk, Maine, at age 76.
