= Charles A. Finn =

American priest

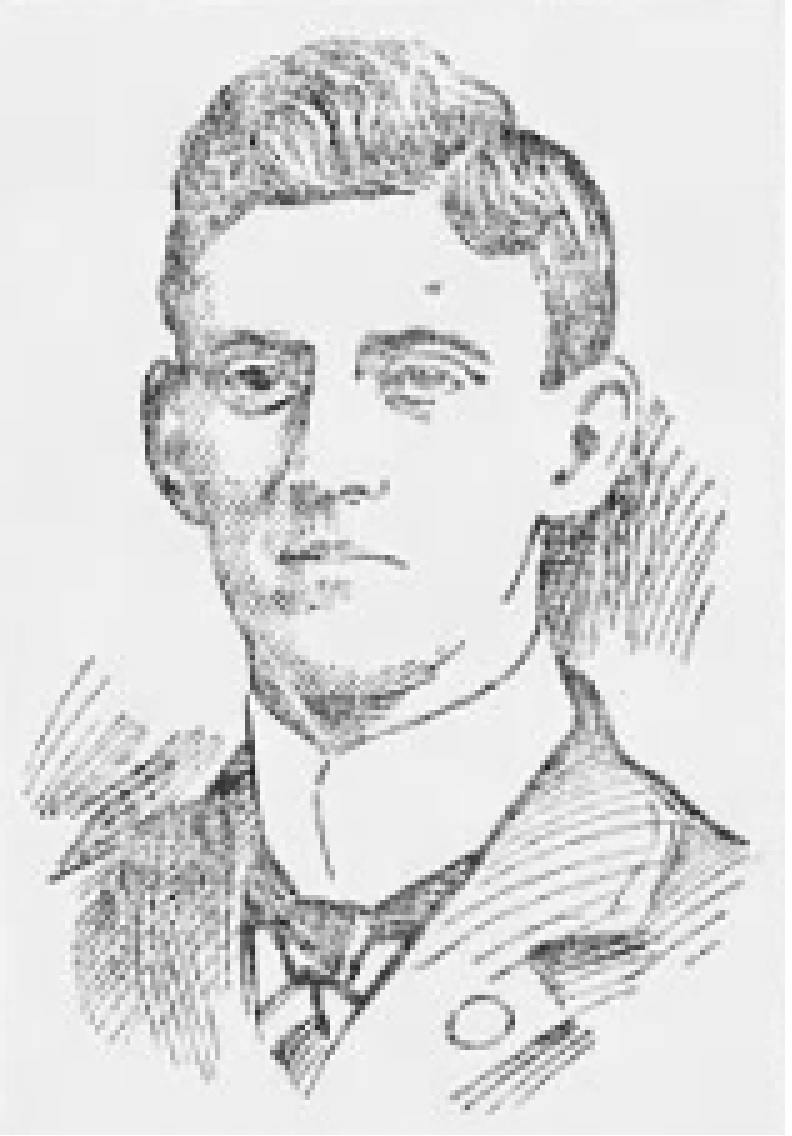
Finn, depicted at the time of his graduation from Boston College in 1899

Monsignor Charles Alphonsus "Zip" Finn (August 2, 1877 – March 7, 1982) was a priest of the Archdiocese of Boston. At the time of his death, he was the oldest priest in the United States, the oldest alumnus of Boston College and the Pontifical North American College, and the oldest Knight of Columbus.

== Early life and education ==
Born on August 2, 1877, in Dedham, Massachusetts as the seventh of 14 children, His parents moved to 17 School St. in Dedham following the Civil War. When his father, Richard M. Finn, died in 1931 at the age of 97, he was the oldest resident of Dedham. His mother died at the age of 86. Finn had a brother, Aloysius, who also attended Boston College and who also became a priest. They also had a nephew who became a priest. Other siblings include brothers Edward, Frank, John, Joseph, and Henry, and a sister, Katherine.

Finn was baptized by Father Denis J. Donovan at St. Mary's Church. He was a charter member of the Dedham Council of the Knights of Columbus, taking his first degree on November 25, 1897, and his fourth degree just before his 103rd birthday in 1980.

Finn was valedictorian of his class at Dedham High School and then went off to study at Boston College where he received a bachelor's degree in 1899. At the commencement ceremonies, Finn gave an address on "Trusts and monopolies" and was decorated with several awards. Boston College would later confer an honorary Doctor of Laws degree on Finn in 1939.

After Boston College, Finn studied at the Pontifical North American College. On June 6, 1903, he was ordained a priest in Rome's Basilica of St. John Lateran, a year ahead of the rest of his class, by Cardinal Pietro Respighi. He then earned a doctorate in sacred theology at the University of the Propaganda. He was a classmate of Pope John XXIII.

== Priesthood ==
Being a friend of the Pecci family, Finn served as a subdeacon at the funeral of Pope Leo XIII, and then attended the coronation of Pope Pius X. He returned to Massachusetts in 1903 and served at Immaculate Conception Church in Salem, St. Paul's Church in Cambridge, and as the first chaplain of the Catholic Club at Harvard University. While at St. Joseph's Church in Medford, he served as a trustee of the Public Library.

He then went on to teach at Saint John's Seminary from 1913 until 1926, at which point he became the rector until 1933. He was also a professor of religion and biology for five years at Emmanuel College beginning in 1921.

Several of his seminary students, including Richard Cardinal Cushing and John Cardinal Wright, went on to become bishops. While attending the National Pilgrimage to Lourdes and Rome in 1948 with Cushing and Wright, he celebrated Mass at the childhood home of St. Bernadette Soubirous.

He was named a monsignor in 1939 and a protonotary apostolic in 1959. The seminary's chapel was named in his honor upon the occasion of his 50th anniversary as a priest. At a banquet for his 60th anniversary, 7,500 people attended. For his 100th birthday, by which time he had seen 20 presidents and 8 popes, a private mass was celebrated with Humberto Cardinal Medeiros.

Finn was chairman of the Archdiocese's Sacramental Apostolate for many years. He was "renowned throughout the clergy for his intellectual achievements and spiritual character." In 1979, Finn was awarded the Bishop Minihan Award by the Massachusetts Knights of Columbus.

During his life, it was estimated that he celebrated more than 25,000 masses. When he retired in 1977, he had been pastor of Holy Name Church in West Roxbury for 23 years. He was long considered "the best-known priest alumnus of Boston College."

== Death ==
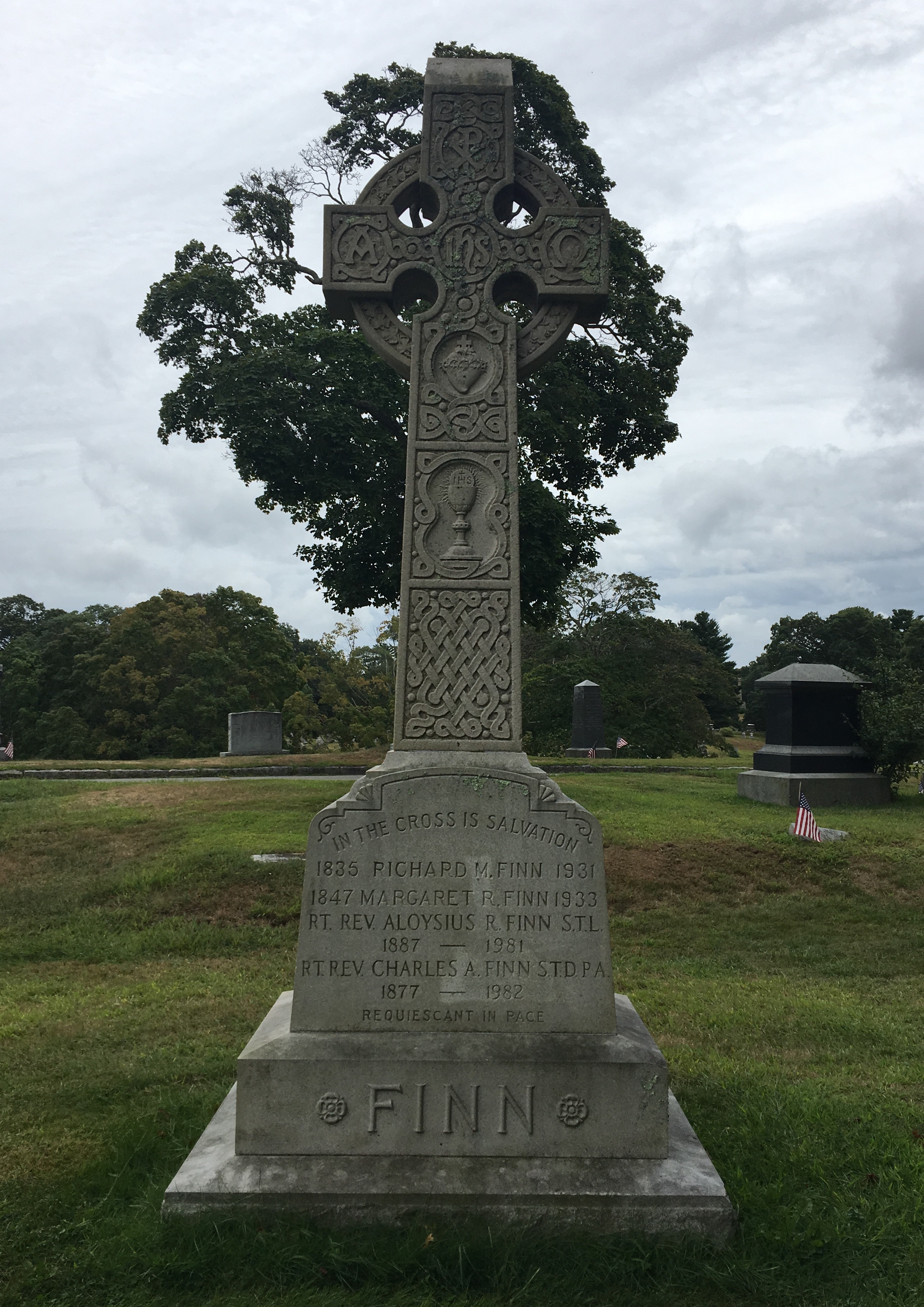
Finn's gravestone at Brookdale Cemetery

He retired to Regina Cleri, a home for retired priests in Boston, and lived there for the final 14 years of his life. At the time of his death on March 7, 1982, at the age of 104, he was the oldest priest in the United States. He was also the oldest member of the Knights of Columbus. Finn's funeral was from Holy Name and he is buried in Brookdale Cemetery in Dedham.

== Works cited ==
- Lapomarda, Vincent A. (1992). The Knights of Columbus in Massachusetts (second ed.). Norwood, Massachusetts: Knights of Columbus Massachusetts State Council.
