= Thomas Francis Markham =

American bishop

His Excellency, The Most Reverend Thomas Francis Markham
- Auxiliary Bishop of Boston; Titular Bishop of Acalissus
- Church: Catholic Church
- Archdiocese: Boston

Orders
- Ordination: June 2, 1917 by Basilio Pompili
- Consecration: September 14, 1950 by Richard Cushing

Personal details
- Born: March 22, 1891 Lowell, Massachusetts, US
- Died: June 9, 1952 (aged 61) Lowell, Massachusetts, US
- Education: College of the Holy Cross; College of Propaganda; Pontifical University of the Holy Cross
- Motto: Nil nisi bonum teipsum Domine (Don't speak ill of the dead)

Thomas Francis Markham (March 22, 1891 – June 9, 1952) was an American prelate of the Roman Catholic Church in the United States. He served as an auxiliary bishop of the Archdiocese of Boston in Massachusetts from 1950 to 1952.

== Early life ==
Thomas Markham was born on March 22, 1891 in Lowell, Massachusetts. He attended the College of the Holy Cross in Worcester, Massachusetts, receiving a Bachelor of Arts degree in 1913. He then went to Rome to reside at the Pontifical North American College while he studied canon law and civil law. He received Doctor of Canon Law and Doctor of Civil Law degrees from the College of Propaganda and the Pontifical University of the Holy Cross.

== Priesthood ==
Markham was ordained to the priesthood in Rome by Cardinal Basilio Pompilj on June 2, 1917, for the Archdiocese of Boston.After his ordination, Markham served as a vice rector at the North American College.

After returning to Massachusetts, the archdiocese assigned Markham as an assistant pastor in parishes in Haverhill, Malden and Boston. He was named rector in 1942 of St. Peter Parish in Boston. During World War II, Markham returned to Rome in 1944 acting as the American representative of the National Catholic Welfare Conference. He was responsible for the distribution of clothing and food in the newly liberated sections of Italy.The Vatican elevated Markham to a domestic prelate in 1945 and a protonotary apostolic in 1946.

== Auxiliary Bishop of Boston ==
Markham was appointed titular bishop of Acalissus and auxiliary bishop of Boston on July 18, 1950, by Pope Pius XII. Markham was consecrated on September 14, 1950, at the Cathedral of the Holy Cross in Boston by Archbishop Richard James Cushing.

== Death ==
Markham died of a cerebral hemorrhage at St. John's Hospital in Lowell on June 9, 1952.
