= Guy Emery Shipler =

American journalist

Guy Emery Shipler (July 31, 1881 – April 18, 1968) was an American journalist and Episcopal clergyman, known for editing The Churchman.

== Biography ==
Shipler was born in Warsaw, New York, the son of John Shipler and Mary Danley. Shipler began his career as a journalist, working for the Rochester Times and the Boston Traveler. He abandoned the newspaper business to become a minister because of his frustration with corporate control of journalism. In 1911 he was ordained as a priest in the Protestant Episcopal Church. Shipler became the editor of The Churchman in 1917, a year before he was named the chaplain of the New York State Militia. The Churchman was an Episcopal monthly magazine known for its liberal perspective (not to be confused with the British evangelical publication of the same name).

Shipler fought against Will H. Hays in 1929, using the editorial page of The Churchman to attack him. Shipler argued that Hays and other film producers were glorifying crime for the sake of profit. His criticism of the motion picture industry led to a successful 1935 libel case against The Churchman brought by Gabriel L. Hess, the attorney for the Motion Picture Producers and Distributors of America. Shipler wrote that Hess had been indicted in Ontario for conspiring with other film producers to limit competition between film companies. Shipler was ordered to pay $10,200 but the money was raised with help from prominent Catholic and Jewish organizations that supported his journal.

Shipler worked with Margaret Sanger to get Episcopal support for information about birth control. With Roger Baldwin and George Soule, he helped to organize the American Friends of Spanish Democracy, to aid the Republic in the Spanish Civil War. In 1939, he denounced Charles Coughlin in front of an audience of 1,000, describing him actions as "dropping a torch into a world filled with high explosives". Encouraged by Lucile Bernheimer Milner to confront Coughlin's views, he devoted a special issue of The Churchman to anti-Fascism. He also served as the chairman of the Hiroshima Commemorative Committee. He resigned as vicar of St. Paul's Church in Newark in 1945, after almost 30 years in the position.

Shipler traveled to Yugoslavia in 1947 with seven other Protestant clergymen. Shipler's positive reports from the trip were criticized by Richard Cushing as anti-Catholic. In 1949, several guests to the annual Churchman Award Dinner declined the invitation because of the magazine's political views, with Leon M. Birkhead stating that the magazine was "so involved with the Communist party line that it is quite impossible for me any longer to participate in its activities" In 1950, he publicly defended William H. Melish against Louis Budenz's accusation that Melish was a member of the Communist Party, writing that the accusation was part of a witch hunt "spearheaded by the Roman Catholic hierarchy, representing the Vatican political state" In 1953, Shipler was accused of being a Communist by Reinhold Niebuhr with little evidence, though Niebuhr eventually apologized for the accusation the following year.

He died of a stroke in April 1968 at his home in Arcadia, California.

== Personal life ==
In 1911, Shipler was engaged to marry Margaret Strong, but their engagement was broken off before the wedding. He later married Rebekah Schultz, who was a deaconess in the Episcopal Church. His son, Guy Emery Shipler Jr., became a prominent journalist covering Nevada politics. Through his son, he was the grandfather of author David K. Shipler.
