= Pope Pius XII (Cardinal Cushing) =

1959 biography of Pope Pius XII

- Author: Richard Cushing
- Subject: Pope Pius XII
- Genre: Biography
- Publication date: 1959

Pope Pius XII is a 1959 biography of Pope Pius XII by Cardinal Richard Cushing. Although it was Cushing's only book, it is of some literary value because it presents alternative historiographical perspectives on the late pontiff, who has been sharply criticized by other writers. It is an almost hagiographic biography, written shortly after the death of Pacelli.

== Pope of Peace ==
Cushing depicted him as the "Pope of Peace", who, armed only with the spiritual weapons of his office triumphed over insidious attacks, that seemed about to destroy the center of Christendom. Nations, paid him respect and the faithful, throughout the world, were inspired to resist the disintegration forces, that were working for the collapse of worldly empires. As a person, Pius XII was a simple but true priest, a pastor, selflessly dedicated to the highest interests of the Church and the greater glory of God.

== Priest, warrior and diplomat ==
- Armed only with the spiritual weapons of his office and fortified by the promise of Christ that the gates of hell would not prevail against the Church. He triumphed over insidious attacks of the secularists and coarser invectives of the atheists. His name became a rallying point for all men of good will who seek the blessings of peace with justice.
- During five years of bloody warfare, that international diplomacy was unable to avert, the Pope of Peace, skillfully, patiently and prayerfully warded off the attacks that seemed about to destroy the center of Christendom. With unshakable courage, he remained within the narrow limits in which he possessed diplomatic immunity. From the contending nations, he commanded respect for the cause of Christ. Within the souls of the faithful, throughout the world, he inspired determination to resist the disintegration forces, that were working for the collapse of worldly empires.
- What was uppermost in my mind is that he was to the very end a true priest, He edified those who knew him most intimately by the austerity and fervor of his personal life. He was truly universal in his outlook ... More than anything he was a pastor, a Good Shepard of souls, selflessly dedicated to the highest interests of the Church and the greater glory of God.

== Historical value of the book ==
After this publication, Cushing abstained from publishing any further books. The book continues to have value, however, because it contains a large appendix with detailed explanations of all Vatican offices and Curia congregations, and legal entities of the Vatican, many of which do not exist anymore. Others have new names. Therefore, the Cushing book provides an encyclopedic introduction into the Vatican, as it existed before Vatican II. This is relevant, because many papal documents before 1958 refer to these entities and congregations.
