= National Pilgrimage to Lourdes and Rome =

1948 US religious pilgrimage to Lourdes and Rome

The National Pilgrimage to Lourdes and Rome took place between August 13 and September 13, 1948. It was the largest pilgrimage to those sites ever to leave the United States.

== Background ==
=== Confraternity of Christian Doctrine National Congress ===
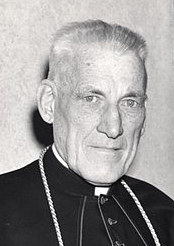
Archbishop Cushing called for and led the pilgrimage.

World War II concluded in Europe on May 8, 1945. The following year, the Confraternity of Christian Doctrine's (CCD) National Congress met in Boston. At the event, they proposed a pilgrimage in the hopes of restoring relations between the United States and Europe in the wake of the war. At the same Congress, Archbishop Richard J. Cushing of Boston called for prayers for the canonization of Pope Pius X. The late pope was considered the modern patron of the CCD.

=== Planning ===
Plans for the pilgrimage were made by Bishop John J. Wright, who traveled to Europe in the summer of 1947 to make arraignments. (Note: While Wright was serving in France in 1938, he led a group of 60 teenagers to Rome on pilgrimage.) During the planning trip, he received the pope's blessing on the endeavor.

Cushing and the Archdiocese of Boston announced in January 1948 that he would be leading a pilgrimage to Lourdes, France and Rome, Italy. Cushing said he would be leading a "peaceful army" to several European sites and asked all to "pray for the world peace and international security needed for the success of this great spiritual venture."

Within a month of the announcement, more than 4,000 people expressed interest in attending, including individuals from 35 of the 48 United States and several Canadian provinces. There were 1,500 who would have attended but the American Express-Catholic Travel League, who organized the trip, could only find steamship accommodations for a smaller number.

For a cost of between $995 and $2085, pilgrims would visit France, Switzerland, and Italy over four weeks. The pilgrims would also have a private audience with Pope Pius XII to petition for the canonization of Pope Pius X.

Additional side trips to other countries, which would add several weeks to the itinerary, were also planned. A complete trip would take pilgrims to eight countries, including Holland, England, Ireland, and Scotland, and would take eight weeks.

=== Prior pilgrimages and devotions ===
Many of the pilgrims would be leaving the country for the first time. Cushing himself had said that prior to the pilgrimage that the closest he had ever been to Rome was South Boston's Castle Island. The last time a large group of Americans made a pilgrimage to Rome was in 1933. The last pilgrimage to Rome led by an Archbishop of Boston took place in 1929 with Cardinal William Henry O'Connell. (Note: In 1939, a group attended a Eucharistic Congress in Budapest.)

There was a strong devotion to Our Lady of Lourdes in Boston at the time. There were numerous churches dedicated to the Virgin Mary under this title, numerous shrines in other churches, and a church dedicated to St. Bernadette Soubirous.

== Voyage to Europe ==
=== Departure from Boston ===
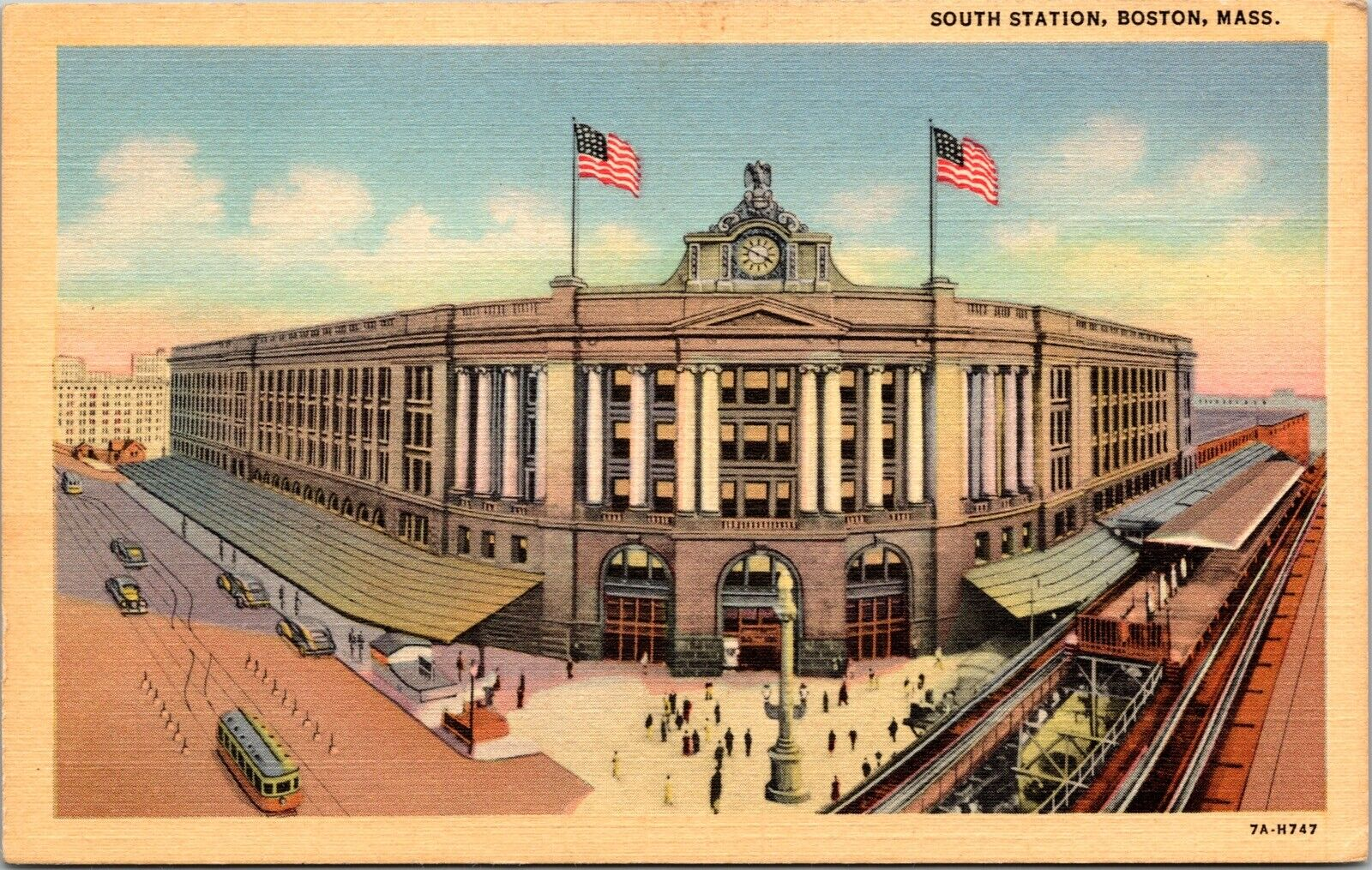
A crowd of 10,000 saw the pilgrims off at South Station.

On August 13, 1948, a special train ran from Boston's South Station to New York City filled with 400 pilgrims. At the station, a crowd of 10,000 were on hand to see them off, including Mayor James Michael Curley. The crowd was double what had been expected, despite no formal send off being planned.

So many people clamored to greet Cushing, who arrived 45 minutes early, that he got off the train and greeted people on the platform for a second time, delaying the train by 20 minutes. More than 100 uniformed Boston Police officers were on hand to direct the crowds, as were 25 railroad police officers. The car Cushing drive to the station in had an escort of six motorcycle officers, and he rode with Police Commissioner Thomas F. Sullivan.

Cushing told reporters, "It would be difficult for any thrill of the pilgrimage to surpass that of the send-off we got from South Station ... I was never so proud to be a Bostonian."

On board the train, Cushing walked the length of the nine cars, shaking hands and speaking with each. A special menu was printed in the dining car for the occasion.

=== Departure from New York City ===
More than 100 additional pilgrims joined them at Pier 90 on New York City's West 50th Street. Another 10,000 people gathered at the pier to wish the pilgrims well. The pilgrims sailed for Europe on Cunard-White Star Line's RMS Queen Mary on August 14.

Before the ship left, every pilgrim from the Boston area was given a copy of the previous day's Boston Evening Globe, which included a story and photos of the send off they received at South Station. The 450 copies of the newspaper were flown by Northeast Airlines and a representative of the airline brought them to the pier.

A bon voyage party was held on board the evening the ship left, and was attended by Harold Borer, the general manager of the Cunard Line, and Ralph Reed, the president of American Express.

The ship, which left just after midnight, had more than 2,200 passengers in total. Also on board were a number of prominent Protestants who were bound for the inaugural World Council of Churches in Amsterdam.

=== Trans-Atlantic crossing ===
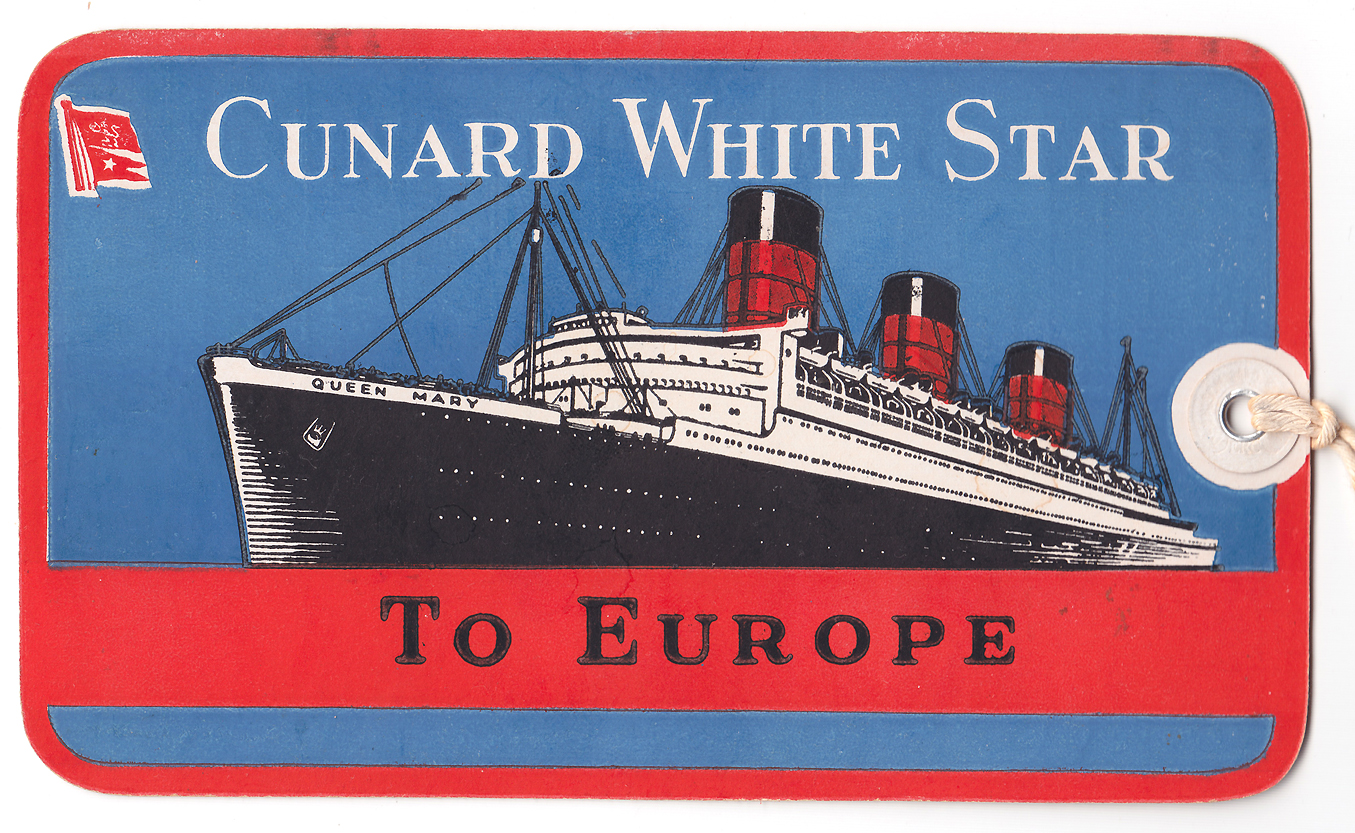
Pilgrims sailed on the RMS Queen Mary.

Daily Mass was offered on board, and pilgrims listened to lectures about the places they would soon be visiting. Each pilgrim received a yellow and purple lapel pin so that they could be easily recognized. Pilgrims took part in many of the activities offered on the ship, including films, dancing, lectures, concerts, and tea time.

During the trip, Cushing and Wright shared the cabin that Winston Churchill occupied on his trip to the Yalta Conference.

The Boston Globe published a special one page edition of the paper for the pilgrims that was distributed each day by volunteers, including Wright. News from Boston and New England was sent by radio to the ship from Boston, and the ship printed special copies for the pilgrims. This continued throughout the pilgrimage.

==== First day ====
On the first day of the crossing, The Fugitive was played. The ship's chief engineer, Thomas A. Llewellyn, hosted a reception on board for the hierarchy. On the promenade deck, confessionals were set up for those who wished to receive the Sacrament of Reconciliation.

==== Assumption of the Blessed Virgin Mary ====
The day after, Sunday, August 15, was the feast of the Assumption of the Blessed Virgin Mary. While on board, Cushing blessed the waters in a ceremony was timed to match the blessing of the waters at Salisbury Beach for the Archdiocese. (Note: The ceremony in Salisbury was led by Monsignor Furlong.) Thousands of passengers, including many non-Catholics and others not on pilgrimage, attended the ceremony. Many pilgrims, believing that swimming in the ocean on the feast day would bring about special blessings and cures, overtaxed in the ship's swimming tank.

Cushing's mass was held in the main lounge, with all 2,200 passengers invited. (Note: A 12 year old boy, Charles F. Twomey Jr. of Lynn, served as altar boy.) In other parts of the ship, the other clergy on board offered 60 additional masses. Cushing reminded pilgrims that the day marked the anniversary of the coronation of Pius X.

Later in the day, Cushing presented a check worth $1,500 to the Lowell Community Chest. That evening, Chief Engineer Tal Bailey ordered the ship to slow down as it was moving too fast and would arrive in France before it was scheduled to do so.

==== Death of Babe Ruth ====
On August 17, the pilgrims learned of the death of Babe Ruth through the Globe's wireless newscast. Throughout the ship, pilgrims said prayers for the repose of his soul, including special prayers said at Cushing's daily Mass.

== France ==
During the pilgrims' time in France, the French press covered their journey.

=== Arrival in Cherbourg and trains to Paris ===
At dawn on August 19, passengers disembarked the Queen Mary at Cherbourg, France. They needed to board smaller ships to bring them to shore as the fighting in World War II, which ended just three years prior, had destroyed all the docks large enough to accommodate ships the size of the Queen Mary.

When the first pilgrims landed on shore, representatives from American Express ran an American flag up a flagpole and there was an impromptu singing of the Star Spangled Banner and several hymns. They were greeted by Henri Claudel, a former French consul in Boston, and several high ranking clerics from the area.

Two special trains were run to take the pilgrims from Cherbourg to Paris. As they slowly passed through Normandy, Cushing stood on the train platform and blessed the thousands of caskets holding the remains of American soldiers that were waiting to be returned to the United States for burial. From there, the trains continued the five hour journey to Paris, viewing countryside still marked from battles of World War II.

The pilgrims alighted at the Saint-Lazare station in Paris. They were greeted by a large crowd, including Monsigneur Baupoin on behalf of Cardinal Emmanuel Célestin Suhard, who was on vacation.

Nine hotels were secured for the pilgrims in the area of the Paris Opera House: the Paris, Grand, Commodore, DeParis, Ambassador, Scribe, Astor, Continental, and Terminous St. Lazaire.

=== Holy Hour at Sacre Coeur de Montmartre ===
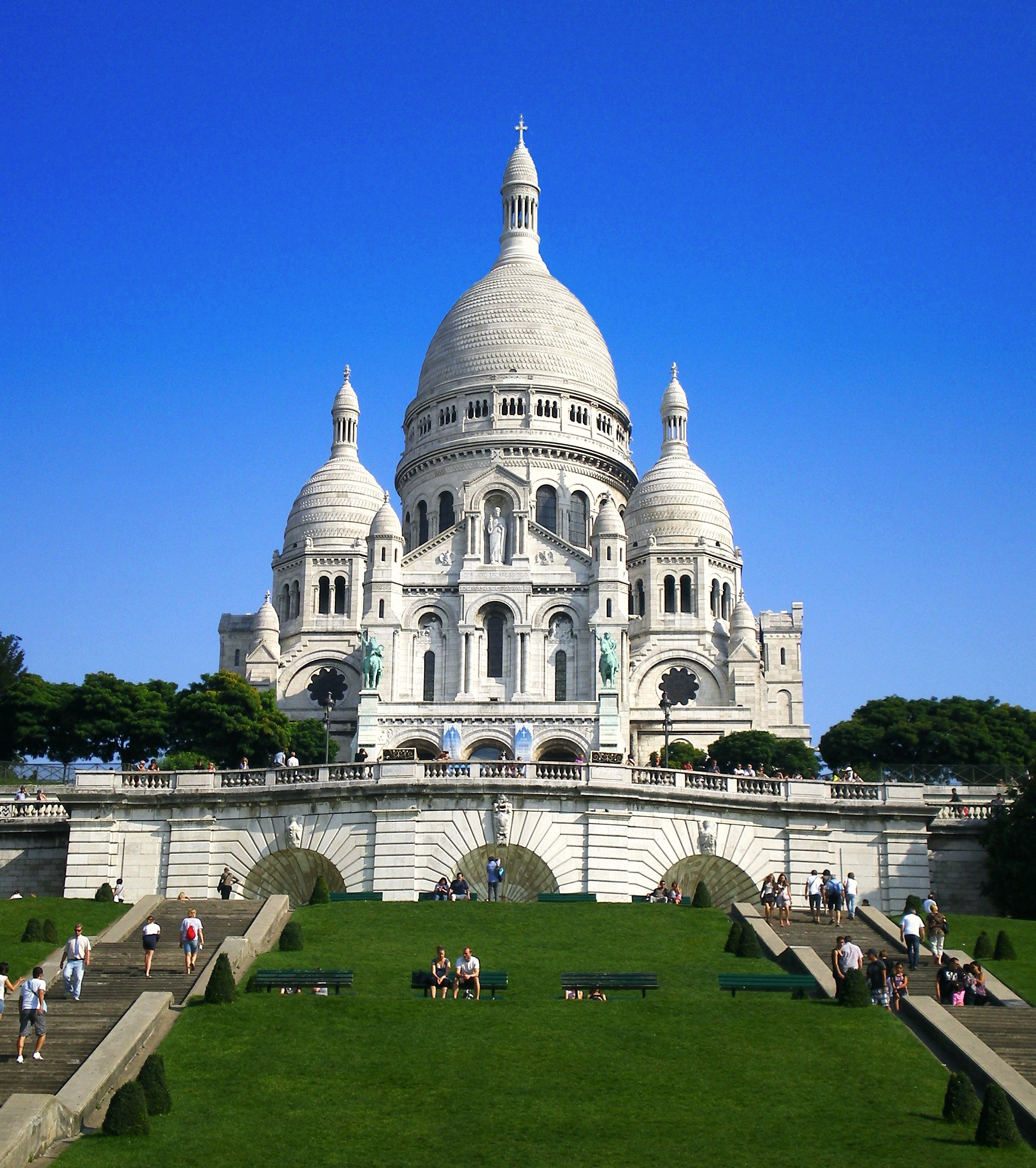
Le Sacre Coeur de Montmartre

On August 20, pilgrims spent the morning sightseeing in Paris. In the afternoon, a Holy Hour was held at the Basilica of Sacre Coeur de Montmartre. Thousands of Parisians joined the Americans in the prayer. After the ceremony, Cushing, joined by the other bishops and flanked by uniformed guards carrying halberds, blessed the pilgrims standing on the broad stone steps of the church.

In his sermon, Brady spoke of the ties that bound the American church with its French counterpart: "The assistance which American Catholics are now extending to their brothers in faith in France are in return for many deeds on behalf of the young Church in America, which France so generously donated in the beginning."

William J. Slattery, the American-born superior general of the Vincentians, echoed Brady in speaking of how it was French priests who brought Catholicism to New England.

Cushing and Wright visited Notre-Dame de Paris to make plans for the Sunday mass where Cushing would preach. The pair and several other clerics then visited the mother house of the Daughters of Charity of Saint Vincent de Paul The sisters served at Carney Hospital in Boston, and Cushing proposed renaming it the St. Catherine Laboure Hospital. He also visited a number of other Catholic societies who are represented in the Archdiocese of Boston.

Several pilgrims took a 75-mile side trip to visit Lisieux, the home of Saint Thérèse.

=== Legion of Honour presentation ===
There was no official program for pilgrims on August 21, with pilgrims free to shop, sitesee, or make trips to other locations such as Versailles and Fontainebleau. The date coincided with the fourth anniversary of the liberation of the Liberation of Paris, and the official municipal celebration was scheduled to end at dawn the next day.

Cushing and Wright were awarded the Legion of Honour that day by French Foreign Minister Robert Schuman. The ceremony took place in the Louis XIV salon on the second floor of the French Foreign Ministry building. Invited guests to the ceremony and luncheon immediately preceding included American Ambassador Jefferson Caffery, O'Hara, Brady, and Ryan.

In his acceptance remarks, Cushing said that generals would always dislike each other and leaders would always tend to dislike each other, but the common people he was leading and those he met in France "wish to love one another and tend to trust one another." Therefore, he said, "the chief objective of all government action on our day should be the facilitating of international friendship and knowledge on a popular level."

The award, which was announced the day before, was given for furthering Franco-American goodwill by leading the pilgrimage. Cushing was awarded the highest order of the Legion. In his remarks, Schuman noted that the first bishop of Boston, Jean-Louis Lefebvre de Cheverus, was French.

The press accompanying the pilgrims were the guests of Pierre Ordiono, the press chief of the French Foreign Office, at the Cercel Interallie.

=== Mass at Notre Dame ===
The pilgrims' final activity in Paris was a Solemn Pontifical High Mass at the Cathedral of Notre Dame on August 22. Cushing wore golden vestments 150 years old during the mass, which Caffrey attended. Cushing prayed in his homily that

"Before this altar of Notre Dame, in the very heart of France, all my companions in sacred pilgrimage join in prayer that God may bless France; that Notre Dame of Paris will inspire . . . All the priests and people of this beloved land to realize in our day the Christian vocation of France; to bear witness before all nations to the primacy of the spiritual, to serve the Church as her eldest daughter."

After mass, a luncheon reception was held.

=== Train to Lourdes ===
Pilgrims left Paris for a 14-hour train ride to Lourdes on August 23. They were met in Lourdes by Bishop Pierre-Marie Théas at 10 p.m. After arriving, they spent the night in 7 different hotels. Before going to bed, the group prayed at the grotto where the Lourdes apparitions took place.

=== Ceremonies in Lourdes ===
The full day was spent at Lourdes on August 24. Bishop Donnell celebrated an early morning Mass at the grotto and Cushing celebrated a Solemn Pontifical High Mass inside the Sanctuary of Our Lady of Lourdes for 2,500 people at 10:30 a.m. At the mass, Wright announced that a 7 year old French boy had been miraculously cured of blindness after visiting the shrine.

At 3:30 in the afternoon, O'Hara led the Way of the Cross and Cushing led a Eucharistic procession. In the evening, a torchlight procession of 30,000 people was held to the grotto where Ryan led the pilgrims in praying the rosary. As the half mile long procession walked, loudspeakers played the Lourdes hymn being sung by the basilica choir.

Two trainloads of pilgrims from Italy also arrived with many sick and disabled persons among them. Boy Scouts formed lanes through the crowds so that the stretcher-bearers could transport the sick.

Cardinal Emmanuel Célestin Suhard of Paris joined the pilgrimage also joined the. Father Charles A. Finn celebrated Mass in the home of St. Bernadette.

That evening, which was Cushing's 53rd birthday, Theas held a reception for the Boston archbishop.

=== Trains to Nice ===
The pilgrims' train left Lourdes early in the morning on August 25. Before embarking, Wright celebrated Mass at 5:30 a.m. in the church and Cushing celebrated Mass for the people of the Archdiocese of Boston in the grotto shrine.

The train stopped at Nice, giving pilgrims the chance to rest and swim in the Mediterranean. Cushing said Mass in the morning at St. Peter's church.

In Nice, a reception was held at Villa Massena at noon and attended by Dr. Soubijou of Nice Catholic Action, Abbey Boyer, representing the bishop, and M. Paez, representing the Mayor who was in Paris and unable to attend. In his remarks, Cushing spoke of the history of the French in establishing the American church and said he hoped the thousands of American tourists he expected to visit France in the next few years would contribute to international peace and understanding.

Pilgrims then took a bus to Monte Casino to sightsee.

=== Cushing hosts sailors ===
On August 27, Cushing hosted nine sailors from the USS Grand Canyon who hailed from the Boston area for lunch at the Negresca Hotel. Earlier that morning, several officers from the USS Fargo met with Cushing and other leaders of the pilgrimage.

The pilgrims left Nice at noon and took the train along the French and Italian Rivieras to Rapallo. When the trains arrived in Rapallo, a delegation of high-ranking officials from the church and local governments were on hand at the station to meet them.

== Italy ==
The pilgrims were well received in Italy. In one town, each pilgrim was given a bouquet of flowers, and in another they received baskets of fruit.

=== Trains to Rome ===
At 8:30 p.m. on August 28, the pilgrims left Rapallo for Rome. When they arrived, they were greeted by war orphans from the Don Orione Institute of Rome. The children repeatedly played the Star Spangled Banner as the pilgrims disembarked to thank them for the shipment of warm clothes the Sisters of Charity of Boston had sent over the previous winter.

=== Mass at Santa Susanna ===
On the pilgrims' first day in Rome, August 29, they visited St. John Lateran, the church where Cushing's predecessor, O'Connell, was consecrated a bishop. Cushing celebrated Mass in the Corsini Chapel where O'Connell was consecrated a bishop. Three priests also head confessions. They then visited Santa Susanna, known as the American Church.

Cushing appeared on the Catholic Question Box radio program hosted by Micheal J. Ahern Jr., a Jesuit priest who was making the pilgrimage. (Note: This broadcast completed Ahern's 19th year on the radio.) The show, with Cushing's 10 minute "Salute from Rome to the People of New England" was broadcast over the Yankee Network in Boston at 2:15.

On the show, Cushing spoke of the war reception the pilgrims received from the peoples of France and Italy. He added that everyone was "rather bewildered but happy" after a day of exploring Rome. He also sent messages home from the sailors he met in Nice several days prior.

=== Tour of the Vatican ===
Wright celebrated a memorial mass for Rhea Good, the wife of an editor at the Boston Daily Record, on the morning of August 30. John D. Brooks, the reporter from the Record attending the pilgrimage, served at the mass.

Pilgrims visited the American Catholic Club clubhouse in Rome and took buses to St. Peter's Basilica. There they toured the Vatican Museum and Library, and the Sistine Chapel. Many attended the opera that evening. Though it was sold out, some pilgrims were able to obtain tickets buy trading two packets of American cigarettes for each ticket.

Hurley and Callahan were the guests for lunch of five Massachusetts nuns living at the Notre Dame Convent. Other pilgrims scattered around the city for a day of sightseeing. Some took a side trip to Assisi.

During the evening, Rev. James Keller gave a lecture at St. Susanna's about The Christophers.

=== Mass at St. Peter's ===
On the last day of August, pilgrims attended a mass celebrated by Cardinal Nicola Canali, the president of the Pontifical Commission for Vatican City State, at St. Peter's Basilica near the tomb of Pope Pius X. They then attended a breakfast hosted by the American Catholic Club.

They then took buses to the North American College for lunch as the guests of Rector Martin O'Connor. The bishops and alumni of the college ate dinner at the faculty residence.

O'Hara said a mass for the repose of the soul of his brother, whose death was cabled from Minnesota. One of the pilgrims, Brother Philip Smith of Lowell, left the group to go on retreat in advance of taking permanent vows with the Oblates of Mary Immaculate.

The press on the trip were accompanied by Monsiegneur Edward G. Murray of Saint John's Seminary to a reception help by the acting Cardinal Secretary of State at the Villa Nazareth.

=== Audience with Pope Pius XII ===
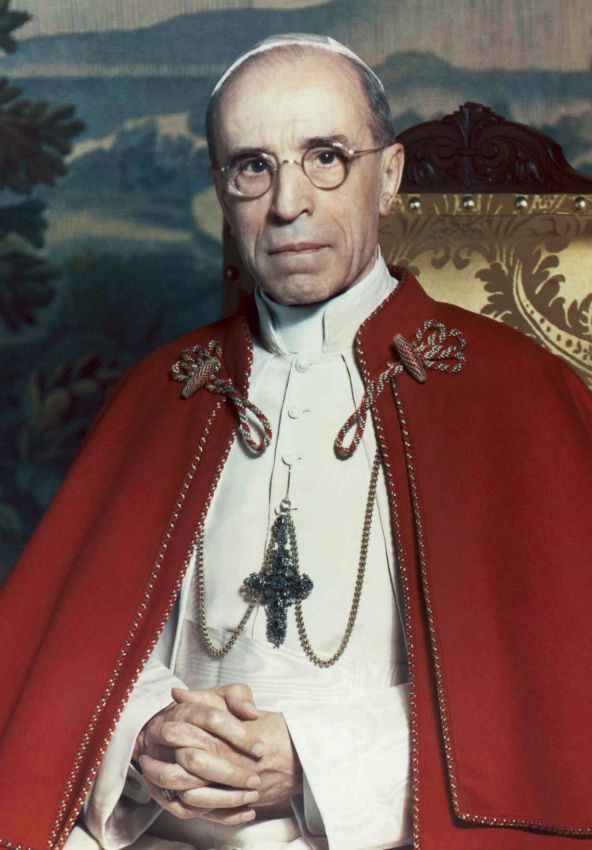
Pilgrims met with PopePius XII

Pilgrims left Rome on the morning of September 1 for Castel Gandolfo for their audience with Pope Pius XII. They used 20 buses and received an escort from Italian motorcycle police. Pilgrims brought religious articles such as rosaries, medals, and crucifixes to receive the papal blessing.

==== Prayers for the United Nations ====
In his address to the pilgrims, given in English, the pope made his strongest public plea yet in support of the United Nations. In his 15-minute speech, he asked for universal prayers that the United Nations Assembly would be a success when it met on September 21 in Paris. (Note: The Boston Globe published the full text of his remarks.)

"We want to remember the work of the United Nations," Pius said. "Many people of high ideals in the United Nations are trying, with their best efforts, to bring back real justice and peace to all—justice and peace to working men, to employers, to all."

Pius was reportedly not optimistic about the success of the general assembly and hoped that hes exhortation would induce Catholics around the world to lobby their governments to improve international relations. He added that the main threats to the world were the poverty that millions of Europeans were living in after the war, and the lack of freedom many others suffered under Soviet governments. He also deplored the wars still being fought around the world, including in China and Palestine.

"If ever an assembly of men, gathered at a critical crossroad in history, needed the help of prayer, it is this Assembly of the United Nations," Pius said.

==== Spiritual bouquet presentation ====
After the pope spoke, Wright presented him with a spiritual bouquet, consisting of the prayers of 22,888,406 American Catholics for Pius X' canonization. The bouquet, a book with a cover of hand tooled white kidskin, would cost more than $15,000 to produce commercially. It also included white moire silk.

Following the group event, Cushing met privately with the pontiff for 30 minutes. Wright then met privately with the pope. Monseigneur A.C. Dalton of St. Kevin's parish in Dorchester was then given a seven-minute audience in which the pope gave Dalton a rosary and a formal papal blessing to bring back to his parish. All pilgrims received a medal commemorating the event.

Several of the journalists, including Callahan, King, Sullivan, and several others also have a private audience with the pope.

After the pilgrims returned to Rome, the American Catholic Club hosted them for a late afternoon reception.

== Return to the United States ==
=== Split groups ===
The pilgrimage officially ended at noon on September 2. The group then split, with Tour A taking the train to Florence. On September 5 they went to Milan, and on September 6 they took an early morning train to Lucerne. September 8 was spent on an all day train back to Paris. This group, which included Cushing, left Cherbourg on the Queen Mary September 8.

Tour B spent an additional day in Rome and then went to Florence. Tours C and D remained in Rome until Sunday, making various side trips. Tour E remained in Rome until the end of the week, and then traveled to Naples.

=== Cushing's side trip ===
Cushing, a member of the Third Order of St. Francis and the national protector of the Third Order in America, made a side trip to see Assisi, the birthplace of Saint Francis. Several other pilgrims joined him. Cushing then flew to Geneva to meet up with the pilgrims again and sailed home with them from Cherbourg.

=== Arrival in New York ===
The Queen Mary arrived in New York on September 13 with 1,994 passengers on board, including Basil O'Connor.

== Attendees ==
A total of 536 pilgrims attended. (Note: Several reports had the total at more than 600.) (Note: The Boston Globe published a list of all the attendees who left from Boston.) Several pilgrims also attended the 1925 pilgrimage to Rome with O'Connell and some had personal contact with Pope Pius X.

=== Clergy and religious ===
Five bishops attended, including three members of the CCD's Episcopal Committee: Matthew F. Brady of Manchester, New Hampshire, Edwin V. O'Hara of Kansas City, Missouri, and Edward F. Ryan of Burlington, Vermont attended, in addition to Cushing and Wright. There were also 11 monsignori, 45 priests, and 10 nuns.

Of the priests, 19 were from Boston and included Charles A. Finn. Another Boston priest, Augustine S. Hargedon, was stricken with arthritis on board the ship and had to be rushed to a Paris hospital as soon as the Queen Mary arrived in France.

Salvatore Screenci was born in Boston, but moved to Italy when he was one year old. He was ordained a priest there, but in 1927 transferred to the Archdiocese of Boston. While in Italy, he planned to obtain an altar of Carrara marble for his parish, ST. Mary's in Salem.

Attending as guests of the archbishop were Sister Emile Ange and Sister Mary Liberalis. Ange gave up a life of Belgian royalty to join the Franciscan Sisters of Mary. She was a witness to a miracle she attributed to the intercession of Pope Pius X when a child at the orphanage where she worked was cured.

A trio of sisters from New Hampshire, including two who were members of the religious Order of the Holy Cross, also attended. Monsignor Jeremiah Francis Minihan made his fourth European trip since graduating from the North American College in 1930.

=== Laity ===
William E. Hale of Walpole, Massachusetts, the recently retired president of the Archdiocese's Holy Name Society, and his wife were the personal guests of Cushing on the pilgrimage. Cushing invited the couple in recognition of Hale's work for the Society.

Mary C. Lynch, the secretary to Thomas Yawkey, Eddie Collins, and Joe Cronin of the Boston Red Sox, was sent on the trip by the Red Sox. Marion Hurley, the widow of former Governor Charles F. Hurley, also attended but drove to New York instead of taking the train.

In addition to the regular pilgrimage activities, Mr. and Mrs. Joseph J. Devine of Scituate, Massachusetts attended so that they could visit the grave of their son who died in the war and who was buried in Rennes, France. Others attended for the chance to visit the land of their birth.

=== Press ===
Members of the press also attended, covering every stop and sending reports home. They included William Callahan of The Boston Globe, Warren Carberg of The Boston Post, John Brooks of the Record-American, and William Schofield of the Herald-Traveler. Mary Sarah King was the Globe's photographer. Lucy Sullivan attended with the Hartford Transcript.
