= Aniceto Fernández Alonso =

Spanish Dominican Priest, 82nd Master of the Order of Preachers

The Very Reverend Aniceto Fernández Alonso OP
- Master of the Order of Preachers
- Church: Roman Catholic Church
- In office: 1962–1974
- Predecessor: Michael Browne
- Successor: Vincent de Couesnongle

Orders
- Ordination: 19 Feb 1921

Personal details
- Born: Aniceto Fernández Alonso; 17 April 1895 Pardesivil of Santa Colomba de Curueño in León, Spain
- Died: 13 February 1981 (aged 85) Rome, Italy
- Education: University of Salamanca; Autonomous University of Madrid

Aniceto Fernández Alonso OP (17 April 1895, in the León province of Spain – 13 February 1981, in Rome Italy) was a Spanish Catholic priest and the Master of the Order of Preachers from 1962 to 1974.

== Early life ==
Aniceto Fernández Alonso was born on 17 April 1895 in the town of Pardesivil, which belongs to the municipality of Santa Colomba de Curueño, in the province of León in Spain. In 1909, at the age of fourteen, he entered the Dominican seminary school at Corias in Asturias. In 1914, when he was 19 years old, he was received into the Order of Preachers (also known as "Dominicans") and began his novitiate in the Padrón convent in La Coruña. In 1915, at the age of 20, he professed his religious vows to the Order of Preachers. He completed his higher studies in the convent of San Esteban de Salamanca (1917–1921) where he obtained the title of reader in theology. He was ordained a priest in February 1921 and transferred to Madrid, where he continued his studies at the Autonomous University of Madrid. He earned a degree at the Autonomous University in physical sciences in 1926.

== Dominican teaching career and ministry ==
Upon graduation from the Autonomous University he was sent to teach Science and Natural Philosophy at the convent of Corias (1926–1932). In 1932 the order called Alonso to Rome to teach Cosmology and Physical Sciences at the International Angelicum College in Rome (1932–1946). He eventually became dean of the Faculty of Philosophy at the Angelicum.

In 1946, Alsonso was appointed partner and Vicar of the Master of his Order (1946–1950). At the end of that term in 1950, the province of Spanish Dominicans elected him to the position of Provincial, a position he held for twelve years (1950–1962). As Provincial of the Spanish Province of Dominicans, Alonso opened new religious houses/convents and founded the Spanish Confederation of Religious (CONFER) over which he presided from 1954 to 1962.

== Master of the Order of Preachers ==
On 22 July 1962, Aniceto Fernández Alsonso, O.P. was elected Master (Superior General) of the Order of Preachers (Dominicans) during the General Chapter of the Order held that year at the Priory of St. Thomas Aquinas in Toulouse, France. The beginnings of his Master Generalate coincided with the years of the Second Vatican Council. Alonso actively participated in all of the conciliar sessions as a Council Father.

In the years following Vatican II, Alonso coordinated the demands and spirit of the council with the drafting of the new constitutions of his Order. The new Dominican constitutions were edited and promoted in 1968. During his term as Master of the Order, Alonso created the Dominican provinces of Vietnam (1967) and the Philippines (1971). In addition, the Vicariate General of Central Africa (1963) and that of South Africa (1968) were created during his watch. In Madrid, 1973, Alonso convened the first Congress of Dominican Missionaries which acted as a powerful boost to the missionary work of the Dominican Order.

The last year of Alonso's term as Master of the Order of Preachers coincided with the seventh centenary of the death of Dominican saint Thomas Aquinas. On that occasion, Alonso convened and presided over an international congress on the person and doctrine of Saint Thomas in Rome and Naples from 14 April to 24 April 1974. The event brought together more than 1,500 Thomism scholars from fifty nations and eventually evolved into the Thomas Aquinas International Society (SITA) of which Alonso was a founding member.

== Later years ==
At the end of his twelve-year term as Master General of the Order of Preachers, Alonso returned to the Angelicum University of Rome where he continued to study and teach about the unity between empirical science and philosophy. He eventually retired to the convent of Santo Domingo y Sixto at which the Angelicum is based. Friar Aniceto Fernández Alonso died in Rome on 13 February 1981 at the age of 86 years.

== In popular culture ==
In Pardesivil, Spain (the birthplace of Aniceto Fernández Alonso), the main street is named for "Father Aniceto." In addition, capping a water fountain in the center of Pardesivil is a bust of Alonso honoring him as the hometown son who became Master of the Dominican Order.
