= Korma (Lycia) =

Town of ancient Lycia

Coordinates: 36°33′11″N 30°18′01″E

Korma (Ancient Greek: Κόρμα) was a town of ancient Lycia, which per the Stadiasmus Patarensis was the destination of a road from Acalissus.

Its site is located near Karabük, Asiatic Turkey.
