= Manuel Suárez Fernández =

Spanish friar (1895–1954)

Manuel Suárez Fernández OP (5 November 1895 - 30 June 1954) was a Spanish Dominican friar and Catholic priest who became the 80th Master of the Order of Preachers in 1946 and served until his death in 1954. He was born in Herías and died in Perpignan.

== Worker-Priest Controversy ==
In February, 1954, in the context of the controversy over the Worker-priest movement in France, Suarez removed the Priors Provincial of the Paris, Lyons, and Toulouse Dominican provinces.

== Death ==
While still in office as Master of the Dominican Order, Suárez was killed in an automobile accident in 1954. He was traveling at the time from Rome to Madrid. Also killed was his secretary, Fr. Aureliano Martinez Cantarino. As a result, Fr. T.S. McDermott, OP, the Dominican Provincial of the Province of St. Joseph (Eastern USA), briefly assumed responsibility for governing the Order until Fr. Michael Browne, OP was elected in April 1955.

Catholic Church titles
Preceded by Martin Gillet	Master of the Order of Preachers; 1946-1954	Succeeded by Michael Browne
