= Grangemockler =

Grangemockler Gráinseach Mhóicléir
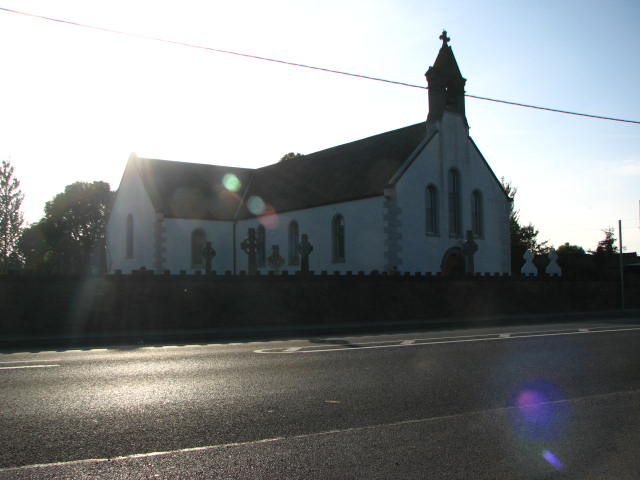
- Saint Mary's RC Church, Grangemockler

- Location within Ireland
- Coordinates: 52.4453°N 7.4693°W
- Country: Ireland
- Province: Munster
- County: Tipperary
- Irish grid reference: S361328

Grangemockler (Irish: Gráinseach Mhóicléir) is a village, civil parish and townland in southeastern County Tipperary, Ireland. It is located 2 km (1.2 mi) southwest of Ninemilehouse on the N76 national secondary road. As of the 2011 census, Grangemockler townland had a population of 193 people.

Grangemockler likely gets its name from the Norman Irish family Mockler. Carrigmoclear Hill, a foothill of Slievenamon approximately 3 km (1.9 mi) northwest of the village, was the site of a battle during the 1798 Rebellion. The local Roman Catholic church is dedicated to Saint Mary and was built c. 1880.

Grangemockler is the home of Grangemockler/Ballyneale GAA club.

== People ==
- Michael Browne (1887–1971), cardinal of the Roman Catholic Church
- Pádraig de Brún (1889–1960), clergyman, mathematician, academic and president of University College Galway
- Daniel Hogan (1895-1940), Irish General who fought in the Irish War of Independence and Irish Civil War
- Michael Hogan (1896–1920), Gaelic footballer killed in the Croke Park massacre

== See also ==
- List of towns and villages in Ireland
