= Michael Browne (cardinal) =

Irish priest and cardinal

His Eminence Michael Browne O.P.
- Cardinal-Deacon of San Paolo alla Regola
- Cardinal Browne in 1962
- Church: Roman Catholic Church
- Appointed: 22 March 1962
- Term ended: 31 March 1971
- Predecessor: Giuseppe Fietta
- Successor: Francesco Monterisi
- Other post: Cardinal Protodeacon (1971)
- Previous posts: Rector Magnificus of the Angelicum (1932–41); Master of the Apostolic Palaces (1951–55); Master of the Order of Preachers (1955–62); Titular Archbishop of Idebessus (1962)

Orders
- Ordination: 21 May 1910
- Consecration: 19 April 1962 by Pope John XXIII
- Created cardinal: 19 March 1962 by Pope John XXIII
- Rank: Cardinal-Deacon

Personal details
- Born: Michael Browne; 6 May 1887 Grangemockler, County Tipperary, Ireland
- Died: 31 March 1971 (aged 83) Santo Stefano Rotondo Hospital, Rome, Italy
- Motto: Viae tuae veritas
- Coat of arms

Styles of Michael Cardinal Browne
- Reference style: His Eminence
- Spoken style: Your Eminence
- Informal style: Cardinal
- See: Idebessus (titular)

Michael Cardinal Browne, O.P. (born David Browne, 6 May 1887 – 31 March 1971) was an Irish priest of the Dominican Order and a cardinal of the Roman Catholic Church. He served as Master General of the Dominicans from 1955 to 1962, and was elevated to the cardinalate in 1962.

== Early Biography ==
Michael Browne was born in Grangemockler, County Tipperary.

== Formation ==
Browne joined the Order of Friars Preachers, commonly known as the Dominicans, in 1903. After studying at Rockwell College, the Dominican convent at the Basilica of San Clemente in Rome, and the University of Fribourg, he was ordained to the priesthood on 21 May 1910.

== Career ==
Browne taught at the Dominican convent in Tallaght, Dublin, where he was Master of Novices until 1919 when he was appointed professor at the Pontifical University of Saint Thomas Aquinas, Angelicum in Rome.

Browne served as Prior of the convent of St. Clemente from 1925 to 1930.

He was the Angelicum's rector magnificus from 1932 to 1941

Browne was appointed Master of the Sacred Palace from 1951 to 1955.

He became Master General of the Dominicans on 11 April 1955, remaining in that position until his resignation in 1962. He was created Cardinal-Deacon of San Paolo alla Regola by Pope John XXIII in the consistory of 19 March 1962, appointed Titular Archbishop of Idebessus on 5 April 1962, and consecrated as bishop on 19 April by John XXIII, with Cardinals Giuseppe Pizzardo and Benedetto Aloisi Masella serving as co-consecrators, in the Lateran Basilica.

Browne attended the Second Vatican Council from 1962 to 1965. A Traditionalist Catholic, he was opposed to the reforms of the Council (including religious liberty) and was a friend of Archbishop Marcel Lefebvre. He was one of the cardinal electors who participated in the 1963 papal conclave that elected Pope Paul VI. From 20 January 1971 until his death, Browne served as Cardinal Protodeacon.

He died in Rome, at age 83, and was buried in the priory cemetery in Tallaght, County Dublin, Ireland.

== Family ==
His brother was Pádraig Monsignor de Brún, a notable priest, poet and scholar, and he was an uncle of Máire Mhac an tSaoi, scholar, poet, wife of Irish diplomat, writer and politician Conor Cruise O'Brien, and daughter of his sister, Margaret Browne and her husband, the Irish revolutionary and statesman Seán MacEntee.

=== The Big Sycamore ===
The Big Sycamore (1958) is a fictionalised account of the early life of the future Cardinal Browne and his family, fictionalised as 'the Fitzgeralds' (his mother's maiden name was Kate Fitzgerald). It was written (under the pen-name Joseph Brady) by another of his brothers, Maurice Monsignor Browne (1892-1979), parish priest of Ballymore Eustace, County Kildare, and Hollywood, County Wicklow, and the author of plays such as Prelude to Victory (1950), and novels such as In Monavalla (1963) and From a Presbytery Window (1971), as well as the afore-mentioned The Big Sycamore.

Catholic Church titles
Preceded by Mariano Felice Cordovani	Master of the Sacred Palace; 1951–1955	Succeeded by Mario Luigi Ciappi
Preceded by Manuel Suárez Fernández	Master General of the Dominican Order; 1955–1962	Succeeded by Aniceto Fernández Alonso
Preceded by Antonio Bacci	Cardinal Protodeacon; 1971	Succeeded by Federico Callori di Vignale
