= Missionary Society of St. James =

The Missionary Society of St. James the Apostle, founded by Richard Cardinal Cushing in 1958, is an international organization of diocesan missionary priests who volunteer a minimum of five years of their priestly lives to service in Peru, Bolivia and Ecuador. They were established by Cushing in response to the call by Pope St. John XXIII for members of the Catholic Church in economically favored nations to assist their fellow Catholics in Latin America.

Based in Boston, US, they are not a religious order, but an organization which facilitates a temporary period of service (usually five years) by Roman Catholic clergy. After this period, most members return to their home diocese, though some remain committed to serve in the work of the Society. While on mission, they make themselves available for work in remote, rural parishes or in urban ones, where the limited resources of the local Church make serving the local inhabitants difficult.

The Society acted under the protection of Seán Patrick Cardinal O'Malley, OFMCap, the archbishop of Boston until his resignation in 2024. In 2008 Fr. David Costello from Limerick in Ireland, was elected Superior of the Society in Peru, and is a director of the society.
