= Daniel Hogan (general) =

Irish general and Army Chief of Staff

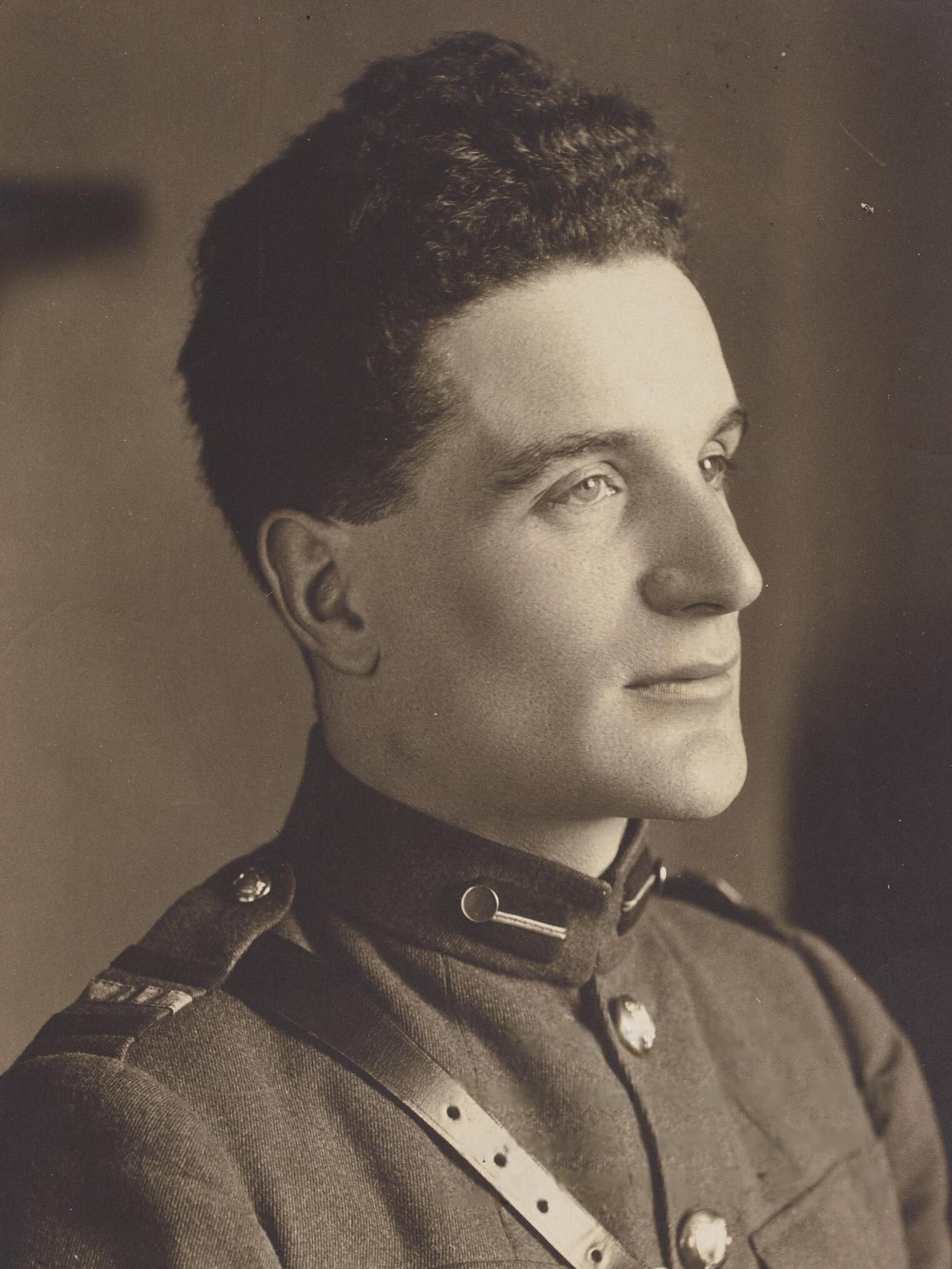
- Hogan, c. 1922
- Born: c.1895 Grangemockler, County Tipperary, Ireland
- Died: c. 1940s United States
- Military career
- Allegiance: Irish Republic; Irish Free State
- Branch: Irish Volunteers; Irish Republican Army; National Army; Irish Defence Forces
- Service years: 1913-1929
- Rank: Lieutenant-General
- Commands: GOC Dublin Command; GOC Eastern Command; Chief of Staff
- Conflicts: Easter Rising; Irish War of Independence; Irish Civil War

Lieutenant-General Daniel Hogan (c. 1895 – 1940s) was Chief of Staff of the Defence Forces in Ireland from March 1927 to February 1929.

== Early life and education ==
Daniel Hogan was born in 1895 in Grangemockler, near Clonmel in County Tipperary, into a farming family. He moved to County Monaghan in 1918 where he worked as a clerk for the Great Northern Railway Company, based in Clones. It was there that he met Eoin O'Duffy and the two became friendly, with Hogan first joining the Gaelic Athletic Association (GAA) and later the Irish Volunteers.

== Career ==
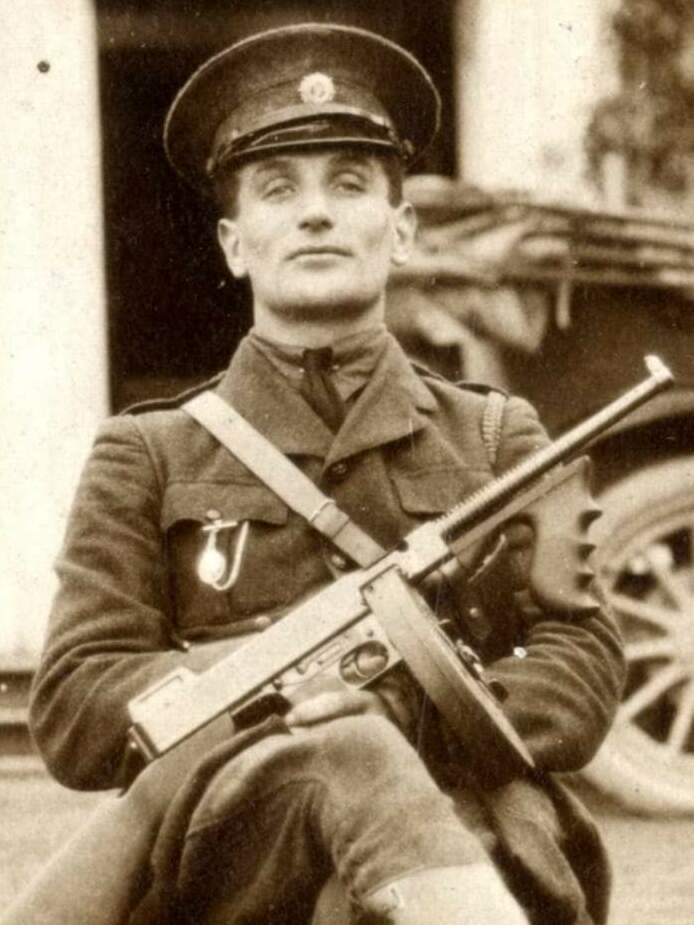
Hogan, c. 1921

During the Irish War of Independence he quickly rose in the ranks to become second in command to Eoin O’Duffy in the Monaghan area. He also continued his involvement with the GAA, played senior football for Monaghan and was arrested, along with O’Duffy, before a game between Cavan and Armagh after refusing to apply for permits from the British authorities to hold the match. In November 1920 his brother Michael Hogan, also a member of the Irish Volunteers and captain of Tipperary was shot dead at Croke Park on Bloody Sunday (the Hogan Stand was named after him). After his release from prison Dan Hogan continued to play an active role in the border areas and by the time of the truce was in command of the 5th Northern Division of the IRA. During the handover of power at Dublin Castle, he attended the blessing of the tricolour and had the honour of being the first to raise the flag officially at the ceremony, attended by Michael Collins.

Hogan supported the Anglo-Irish Treaty and joined the Free State Army at the beginning of the Irish Civil War, rising to the rank of Major General of the Eastern Command. It was during this period that he came to public attention after the general manager of the Great Northern Railway Company, John Bagwell, was kidnapped by anti-treaty forces, on hearing of the kidnapping Hogan issued a proclamation to the effect that if he was not safely released, reprisals would be taken against anti-treaty prisoners in custody. Within less than 24 hours of the proclamation Bagwell was released. He continued serving with the army after the end of the Civil War and in 1927 succeeded General Peader McMahon as Chief of Staff of the Defence Forces. He resigned from this post in 1929 after a dispute with the then Minister of Defence, Desmond Fitzgerald. The incident had involved the then Army chief of staff, Gen Dan Hogan, and the minister for defence, Desmond FitzGerald, who were having a disagreement over soldiers' pay and conditions. During this, according to the memoirs of CS "Todd" Andrews, Hogan struck FitzGerald. It was the end of the former's career.

Shortly after leaving the army, he emigrated to New York, on board the SS George Washington, and it is more than likely that it was at this time that he made the gift of a sword to Eoin O’Duffy, as the two remained good friends and O’Duffy travelled to the port with him to see him off to America.

== Life in America ==
He lived first at 13 Lincoln Avenue, Massapequa, Long Island, with his wife Betty Hogan (née Flynn), then they moved to 233 Ashland Place, Brooklyn, in the mid-1930s. He corresponded with the Department of Defence with regards his pension in late 1939, but his wife and daughter had no contact with him from 1938. He then started to use an address c/o Reverend Brother Wilfred Hogan, Christian Brothers, Westland Row in Dublin, getting pension cheques sent there.

He moved back to Dublin for about six months, before going back to the United States in 1940. His last known address which was c/o McBride, 5320 Dorchester Avenue, Chicago, Illinois. The last contact he had with the Department of Defence was January 1940, and his last pension payment was cashed in June 1941.

Dan Hogan's whereabouts after that time, or his fate, have not been established. According to Fearghal McGarry's biography of Eoin O'Duffy, "Hogan left for the United States under a cloud, financial or sexual. He was killed in a bar brawl there in the early 1940s".

Military offices
Preceded by Peadar MacMahon	Chief of Staff of the Defence Forces; 1927–1929	Succeeded by Seán Mac Eoin
