= Eric Francis MacKenzie =

American Roman Catholic bishop

His Excellency, The Most Reverend Eric Francis MacKenzie
- Auxiliary Bishop of Boston; Titular Bishop of Alba
- Church: Catholic Church
- Archdiocese: Boston

Orders
- Ordination: October 20, 1918 by William Henry O'Connell
- Consecration: September 14, 1950 by Richard Cushing

Personal details
- Born: December 6, 1893 Boston, Massachusetts, US
- Died: August 20, 1969 (aged 75) Boston
- Education: Catholic University of America
- Motto: Pax diligentibus legem (Peace to those who love the law)

Eric Francis MacKenzie (December 6, 1893 – August 20, 1969) was an American prelate of the Roman Catholic Church in the United States. He served as an auxiliary bishop of the Archdiocese of Boston in Massachusetts from 1950 to 1969.

== Early life ==
MacKenzie was born on December 6, 1893, in Boston, Massachusetts

MacKenzie was ordained to the priesthood in Boston for the Archdiocese of Boston on October 20, 1918 by Cardinal William Henry O’Connell. He earned a Doctor of Canon Law degree from the Catholic University of America in Washington, D.C.. His dissertation was: "The Delict of Heresy in Its Commission, Penalization, Absolution, (CUA diss. 77, 1932) 116 pp."

== Auxiliary Bishop of Boston ==
On July 11, 1950, Pope Pius XII appointed MacKenzie as titular bishop of Alba and auxiliary bishop of the Boston. He was consecrated on September 14, 1950 at the Cathedral of the Holy Cross in Boston by Archbishop Richard Cushing.

MacKenzie died on August 20, 1969, in Boston. He was buried at Saint Joseph Cemetery in Boston.
