= Santa Colomba de Curueño =

Coordinates: 42°45′N 5°25′W

Santa Colomba de Curueño, Spain
- Coat of arms
- Interactive map of Santa Colomba de Curueño, Spain
- Country: Spain
- Autonomous community: Castile and León
- Province: León
- Municipality: Santa Colomba de Curueño

Area
  - Total: 92 km^{2} (36 sq mi)

Population (2025-01-01)
  - Total: 502
  - Density: 5.5/km^{2} (14/sq mi)
- Time zone: UTC+1 (CET)
  - Summer (DST): UTC+2 (CEST)

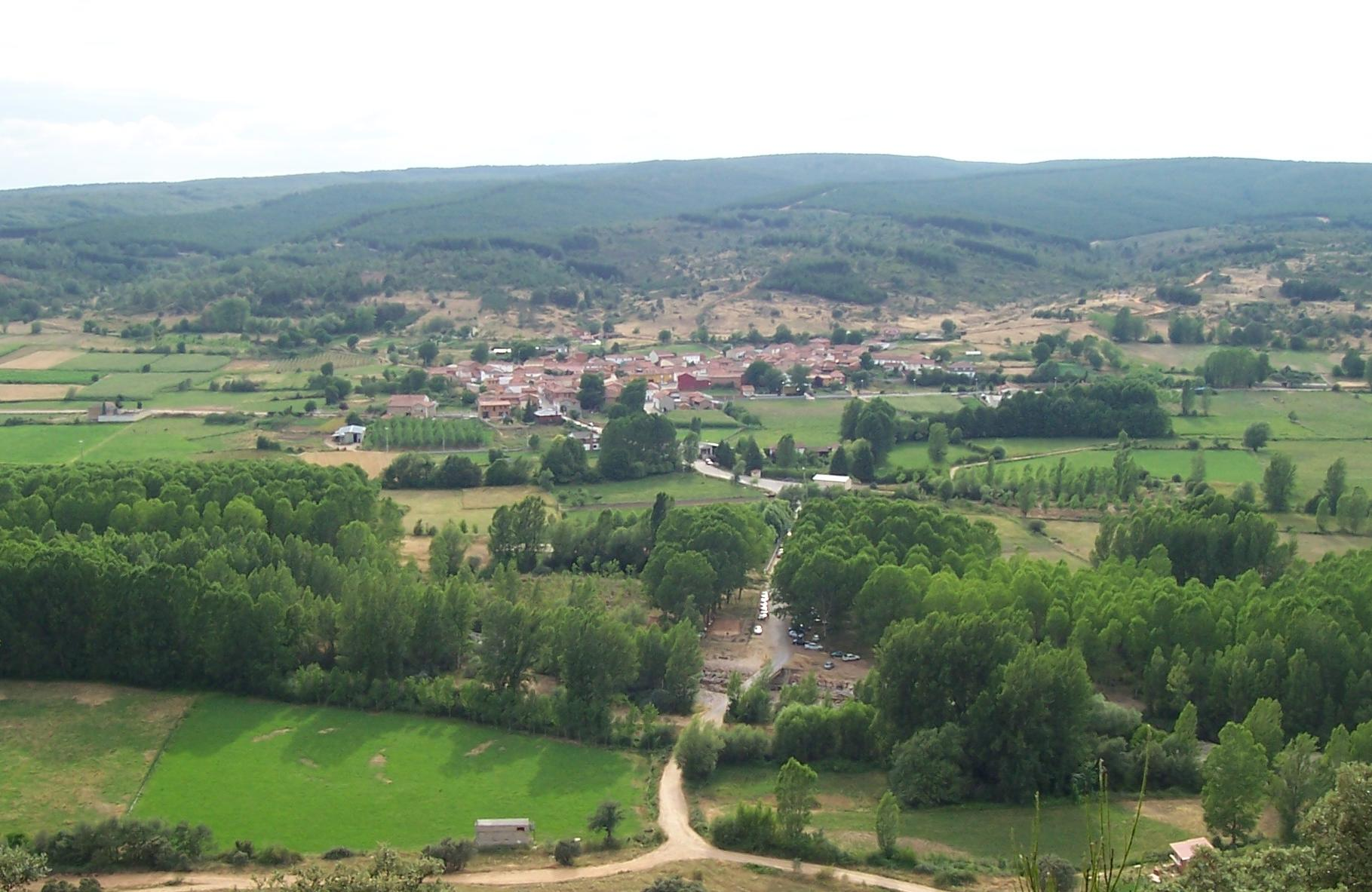
The town of Santa Colomba de Curueño.

Santa Colomba de Curueño (Santa Colomba de Curueñu, in Leonese language) is a municipality located in the province of León, Castile and León, Spain. According to the 2004 census (INE), the municipality has a population of 601 inhabitants.
