= Charles C. Finn =

American poet

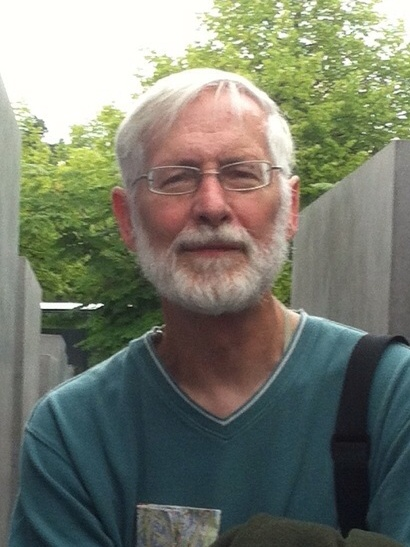
Charles C. Finn in Berlin in 2012.

Charles "Charlie" Carroll Finn (born September 21, 1941) is an American poet most notable for writing "Please Hear What I'm Not Saying" in September 1966.

== Biography ==
Finn grew up in Cincinnati, Ohio, the second of three children. After graduating from St. Xavier High School in 1959, Finn spent ten years in the Society of Jesus before leaving the Jesuits and getting Literature and Psychology degrees from Chicago's Loyola University.

In 1979 Finn relocated to outside Roanoke, Virginia with his wife and practices as a licensed professional counselor. Finn has published over 20 books of his original poetry and history on topics such as the Civil War, Quakerism and Spirituality.
