= Idebessos =

Ancient city in Lycia

Idebessos, Idebessus
- Edebessus, Edebessos
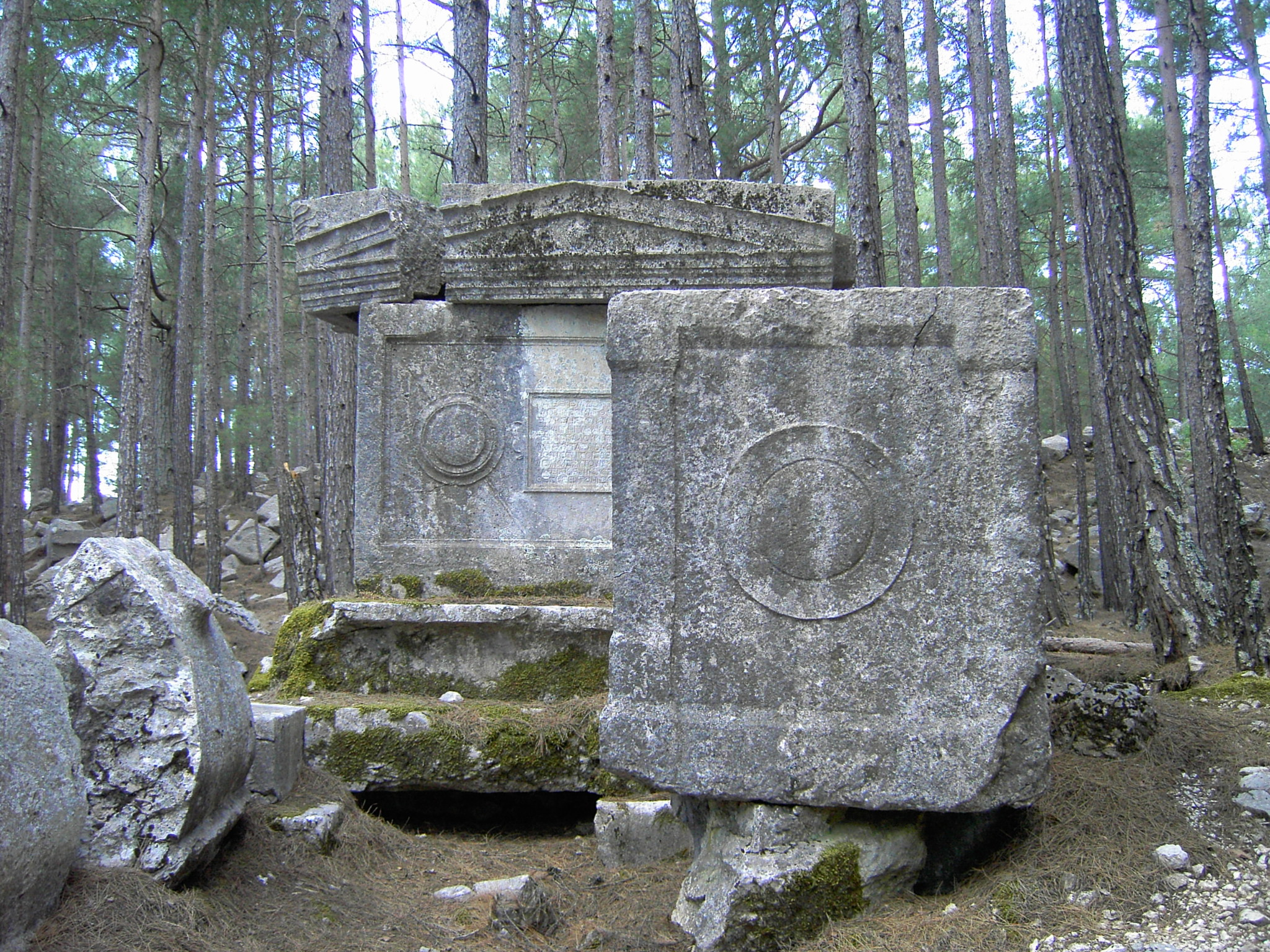
- A tomb of the exedra type in Idebessos/Idebessus

- Location within Turkey
- 36°33′17″N 30°12′08″E
- Type: Settlement
- Location: Kozağacı, Antalya Province, Turkey
- Region: Lycia

Site notes
- Length: 360 m (1,180 ft)
- Width: 160 m (520 ft)
- Area: 5.76 ha (14.2 acres)

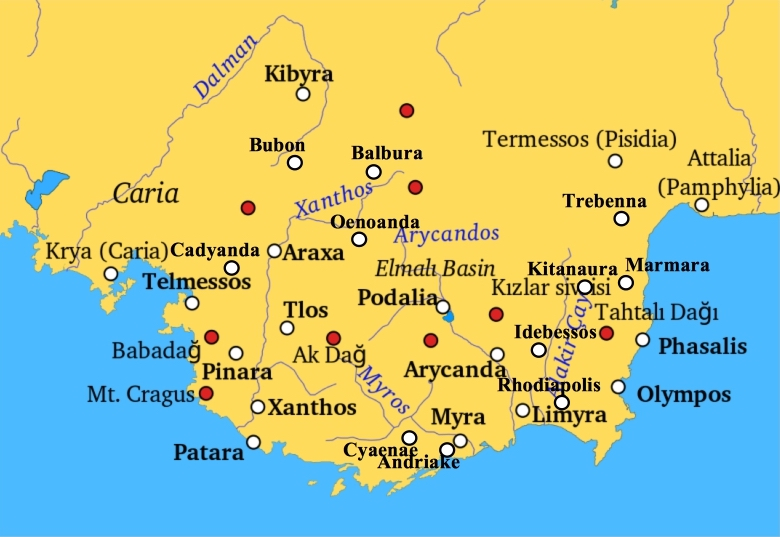
Cities of ancient Lycia

Idebessos or Idebessus, also known as Edebessus or Edebessos (Ancient Greek: Ἐδεβησσός) or (Ancient Greek: Ἐδεβησός), was an ancient city in Lycia. It was located at the foot of the Bey Mountains to the west of the Alakır river valley. Today its ruins are found a short distance to the west of the small village of Kozağacı in the Kumluca district of Antalya Province, Turkey. The site, 21 kilometres north-northwest of Kumluca, is overgrown with forest and hard to reach.

== Geography ==
The city lies at an altitude of 1050 m. Due to the nature of the terrain, the city was built in a north-south orientation and occupies approximately 360 by 160 m. Larger public buildings and the necropolis were built on flatter areas in the west, while dwellings were mostly built on the sloping part of the terrain in the east. The eastern slope is widened by terrace walls at different elevations, which provided narrow corridors with primarily houses.

== History ==
Except for a coin from the Classical period, which has been controversially attributed to the city, there is no evidence of the city's existence before the Hellenistic period. Idebessos was a member of the Lycian League from its foundation in 168 BC. Inscriptions mention that the city was a polis and a member of a sympoliteia with Akalissos and Kormos. The sympoliteia was led by Akalissos and represented by a single vote in the Lycian League during the Roman period.

A Lycian town named Edebessus (Ἐδεβησσός) is mentioned by the Lycian Capito in his Isaurica, an 8-volume history of Isauria. The Synecdemus lists Elebesus (Ἐλεβεσός), corrected to "Edebessus" (Ἐδεβησσός) in Wesseling's 1735 edition, while Parthey's 1866 edition suggests that it may correspond to the Λεβισσός or Λιβυσσός (Lebissus or Libyssus) mentioned in the Notitiae Episcopatuum. A report on archaeological investigations in 2005 also presumed an identity of Idebessus with the bishopric town of Lebissos or Lemissos. However, the list of titular sees (formerly residential) that are recognized by the Catholic Church includes both Idebessus (identified with modern Kozağacı) and Lebessus (identified with modern Kayaköy) and describes each as a suffragan of the metropolitan see of Myra, the capital of the Roman province of Lycia.

The city was still occupied in the Byzantine period, and it is not known when the city was deserted.

== Archaeological investigations ==
T. A. B. Spratt identified the ruins of the city as the remains of Idebessos in 1842. In two days he surveyed the site and copied some inscriptions. Over time numerous other scholars visited the archaeological site for smaller investigations, but it was not until the 2000s that a detailed survey of all the remains was completed.

== Layout ==
A main street entered the city to the west of the acropolis and then ran north. From the south to the north a Greek theater, a bath-gymnasium complex and a church are found along this road. The public center of the settlement is the area between the theater and the baths. A wide flat area between these buildings must have served as the agora.

The necropolis extends uninterrupted along the main street and is most dense in the city's center, which is quite unusual. Normally necropoleis were located along the main roads leading to the city and end outside the settlement. The baths, theater, northern church and the necropolis have been reasonably well preserved, but most of the houses are damaged to a level that it is not possible to determine their layout.

=== Acropolis ===
The acropolis covers an area of 120 by 150 m in the southeast of the settlement, rising approximately 10 m above the city centre. The northern and western sides of the acropolis were protected with walls reinforced with three towers. The eastern and southern sides of the acropolis were naturally protected by steep rock faces and had a terrace wall. A heroon from the Roman period and a Byzantine church from the 5th or 6th century AD were built on the acropolis.

In the Byzantine period the acropolis was transformed to a castrum with stronger fortifications. It encircled the church and was constructed with building material partially reused from the structures of the Roman period. It must have been built in the 7th or 8th century AD, when the region was subject to increasing Arab raids as a consequence of the Arab–Byzantine wars.

=== Other structures ===
The Greek theatre dates to the Hellenistic period. It was built into the northwestern slope of the acropolis hill and has been estimated to seat a maximum of 364 people. The bath-gymnasium complex was most likely built no later than the 2nd century AD and consists of seven separate units and a palaestra. The baths were supplied with water from a stream to the north of the city by a small canal. The northern church is the largest church of the settlement, measuring about 15.30 by 28.15 m and likely built in 5th or 6th century AD. A small triconch church is found south in the city, but is completely ruined. It was possibly built later than the two other churches. The necropolis counts 51 sarcophagi and four exedra-type tombs.
