= Pádraig de Brún =

Irish clergyman and classical scholar

- Born: 13 October 1889; Grangemockler, County Tipperary, Ireland
- Died: 5 June 1960 (aged 70); Dublin, Ireland
- Education: Rockwell College; Holy Cross College; Royal University of Ireland; National University of Ireland; Irish College in Paris; Sorbonne
- Occupations: Catholic Priest, mathematician and classical scholar
- Relatives: Michael Cardinal Browne (brother); Maurice Monsignor Browne (brother); Seán MacEntee (brother-in-law); Máire Mhac an tSaoi (niece)

Pádraig Monsignor de Brún (13 October 1889 – 5 June 1960), also called Patrick Joseph Monsignor Browne, was an Irish Roman Catholic priest, linguist, Classicist, and Celticist. With regard to his contribution to Modern literature in Irish, de Brún, who Louis de Paor termed in 2014 "one of the most distinguished literary figures of his time", was also a writer of Irish poetry in the Irish language and the literary translator of many of the greatest works of the Western canon into Modern Irish. The Monsignor served as President of University College, Galway (UCG), and was known in friendly and informal circles as Paddy Browne.

== Life ==
Monsignor de Brún was born at Grangemockler, County Tipperary, in 1889, the son of a primary school teacher, Maurice Browne. He was educated locally, at Rockwell College, Cashel, and at Holy Cross College, Clonliffe, Dublin (at both he was tutored in mathematics by Éamon de Valera). in 1909 he was awarded a BA from the Royal University of Ireland, he was awarded an M.A. degree by the National University of Ireland, and won a travelling scholarship in mathematics and mathematical physics, enabling him to pursue further studies in Paris. He was ordained as a Catholic priest at the Irish College in Paris in 1913, the same year he earned his D.Sc. in mathematics from the Sorbonne under Emile Picard.

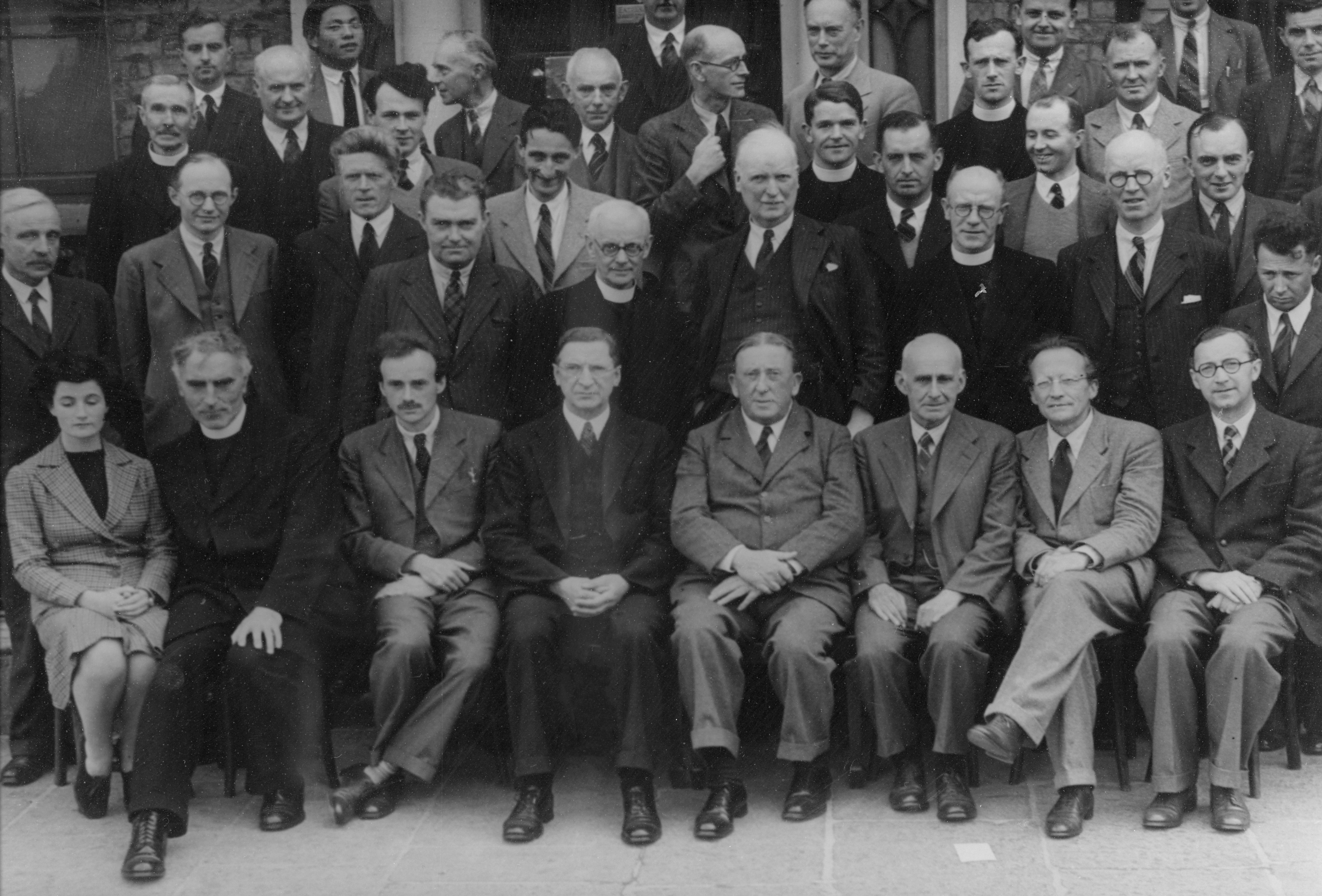
Dr. Pádraig de Brún (as he then was, 2nd from left) at the Dublin Institute for Advanced Studies in 1942

After a period at the University of Göttingen, de Brún was appointed professor of mathematics at St. Patrick's College, Maynooth, in 1914. In April 1945, he was elected by the Senate of the National University of Ireland to succeed John Hynes as President of University College, Galway, an office he held until his retirement in 1959. His friend Thomas MacGreevy referred to de Brún as, "Rector Magnificus", and praised his, "Olympian capacity to appreciate the most exalted works of art and literature, ancient and modern."

The School of Mathematics, Mathematical Physics and Statistics is based in Áras de Brún, a building named in his honour. He subsequently became Chairman of the Arts Council of Ireland, a position he held until his death in 1960. He also served as chairman of the Council of the Dublin Institute for Advanced Studies.

He was close friend of 1916 Easter Rising leader Seán Mac Diarmada and was deeply affected by the latter's execution.

De Brún was a prolific writer of Irish poetry in the Irish language, including the well-known poem "Tháinig Long ó Valparaiso". He further translated into Modern Irish many great works of the Western canon, including Homer's Iliad and Odyssey, Sophocles' Antigone and Oedipus Rex, and Plutarch's Lives, as well as French stage plays by Jean Racine and Dante's The Divine Comedy. With regards to his importance to Modern literature in Irish, de Brún was recently termed, "one of the most distinguished literary figures of his time."

The French Government awarded de Brún the title of Chevalier of the Legion d'Honneur in 1949, and in 1956, the order Al Merito della Repubblica Italiana was conferred on him by the President of Italy. He was created a domestic prelate (a Monsignor) by the Pope in 1950.

De Brún bought land at Dún Chaoin (Dunquin) in the Dingle Peninsula Gaeltacht. In the 1920s, he also built a house there known as Tigh na Cille, where his sister and her children would often visit and stay at length. Through de Brún's literary mentorship of his niece, the future poet Máire Mhac an tSaoi, he has been credited with having an enormous influence upon the future development of Modern literature in Irish.

The Rt. Rev. Pádraig Monsignor de Brún died in Dublin on 5 June 1960.

== Family ==
One of his brothers was His Eminence Michael Cardinal Browne, a member of the Dominican Order who eventually became Master of the Order of Preachers and an ally of Archbishop Marcel Lefebvre, the Traditionalist Catholic prelate. The Browne's sister, recognised Medievalist and Irish bardic poetry scholar Margaret Browne, married Irish War of Independence veteran and Fianna Fáil statesman Seán MacEntee. They had a daughter who became, due to her mother and uncle's mentorship, the highly important and pioneering Irish language Modernist poet and literary scholar Máire Mhac an tSaoi.

== In popular culture ==
The Big Sycamore (1958) is a fictionalised account of the early life of the Browne family, written (under the pen-name Joseph Brady) by his brother, Maurice Monsignor Browne.

== Sources ==
- Obituary, The Irish Times, 6 June 1960
- University College Galway

Academic offices
Preceded by John Hynes	President of University College Galway; 1945–1959	Succeeded by Martin J. Newell
