= Lucille Bernheimer Milner =

American civil libertarian (1888–1975)

- Born: Lucille Bernheimer; June 9, 1888; St. Louis, Missouri
- Died: August 14, 1975 (aged 87); New York, New York
- Education: New York School of Philanthropy, Rand School of Social Science
- Occupation: Social worker

Lucille Bernheimer Milner (born Lucille Bernheimer, June 9, 1888 – August 14, 1975) was a cofounder of the American Civil Liberties Union.

== Biography ==
Milner was born on June 9, 1888, in St. Louis, Missouri. At the age of 16 she moved to Colorado where she was treated for tuberculosis, returning to St. Louis until she moved to Mobile, Alabama to live with relatives. In 1912, she married her first cousin (Reece Bernheimer or Maurice Lowenstein depending on the source). Milner refers to her first husband only as "Reese" in her autobiography. He died the same year.

Milner moved to New York where she attended the New York School of Philanthropy (now the Columbia University School of Social Work), and the Rand School of Social Science. She returned to St. Louis after graduation. There she met Roger Nash Baldwin, who she worked with at the St. Louis, Civic League. She became active in the cause of women's suffrage, joining the Equal Suffrage League of St. Louis and attending the National American Woman Suffrage Association.

Returning to New York, Milner was active in the National Civil Liberties Bureau (NCLB) advocating for the rights of conscientious objectors to military service. After NCLB was dissolved in 1920, she would go on to serve as the executive secretary of the newly formed American Civil Liberties Union (ACLU). The same year she married Joseph Milner with whom she had two children.

Milner had a long association with the ACLU. Her relationship grew strained in the 1930s when the ACLU began removing members of the organization who were known members of the Communist party. Specifically, the ACLU forced the resignation of Harry F. Ward and Elizabeth Gurley Flynn. Milner quit the organization in to protest the ACLU's advocacy for the rights of American fascist groups in the 1940s.

In 1954, she wrote an autobiography entitled The Education of an American Liberal.

She died of a heart attack on August 14, 1975, in New York City.
