= Richard Cushing =

American Catholic cardinal

His Eminence Richard James Cushing
- Cardinal, Archbishop of Boston
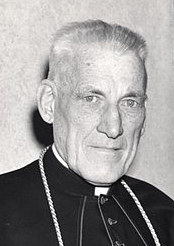
- See: Boston
- Installed: September 25, 1944
- Term ended: September 8, 1970
- Predecessor: William Henry O'Connell
- Successor: Humberto Sousa Medeiros
- Other post: Cardinal-Priest of Santa Susanna
- Previous post: Auxiliary Bishop of Boston (1939–1944)

Orders
- Ordination: May 26, 1921 by William Henry O'Connell
- Consecration: June 29, 1939 by William Henry O'Connell
- Created cardinal: December 15, 1958 by John XXIII
- Rank: Cardinal-Priest

Personal details
- Born: Richard James Cushing; August 24, 1895 Boston, Massachusetts
- Died: November 2, 1970 (aged 75) Boston, Massachusetts
- Motto: Ut Cognoscant Te (That they may know thee)
- Coat of arms: Richard James Cushing's coat of arms

Ordination history of Richard Cushing
History
Episcopal consecration
- Consecrated by: William Henry O'Connell (Boston)
- Date: June 29, 1939
Episcopal succession
Bishops consecrated by Richard Cushing as principal consecrator
- Edward Francis Ryan: January 3, 1945
- Louis Francis Kelleher: June 8, 1945
- John Joseph Wright: June 30, 1947
- Eric Francis MacKenzie: September 14, 1950
- Thomas Francis Markham: September 14, 1950
- Jeremiah Francis Minihan: September 8, 1954
- George Hamilton Pearce: June 29, 1956
- Harold William Henry: May 11, 1957
- Jaime Antônio Schuck: February 24, 1959
- Thomas Joseph Riley: December 21, 1959
- William John McNaughton: August 21, 1961
- Samuel Emmanuel Carter: April 25, 1966
- James Burke, O.P.: May 25, 1967
- Daniel Anthony Cronin: September 12, 1968

Richard James Cushing (August 24, 1895 – November 2, 1970) was an American prelate of the Catholic Church. He served as archbishop of Boston from 1944 to 1970 and was made a cardinal in 1958. Cushing's main role was as fundraiser and builder of new churches, schools, and institutions. Unlike his predecessor, he was on good terms with practically the entire Boston elite, as he softened the traditional confrontation between the Catholic Irish and the Protestant upper-class. He built useful relationships with Jews, Protestants, and institutions outside the usual Catholic community. He helped presidential candidate John F. Kennedy deflect fears of papal interference in American government if a Catholic became president.

Cushing's high energy level allowed him to meet with many people all day, often giving lengthy speeches at night. He was not efficient at business affairs, and when expenses built up he counted on his fundraising skills instead of cost-cutting. Cushing, says Nasaw, was "fun-loving, informal, and outgoing. He looked rather like a tough, handsome, Irish cop and behaved more like a ward politician than a high church cleric." His major weakness in retrospect was overexpansion, adding new institutions that could not be sustained in the long run and had to be cut back by his successors.

== Early life and education ==
Richard Cushing was born in City Point in the South Boston neighborhood of Boston, Massachusetts, on August 24, 1895. The third of five children, he was the son of Patrick and Mary (née Dahill) Cushing. His father came from Glanworth, County Cork, and his mother from Touraneena, County Waterford, both in Ireland. Patrick Cushing arrived in Boston in 1880. He worked as a blacksmith, earning $18 per week in the trolley repair pits of the Boston Elevated Railway, the public transit system.

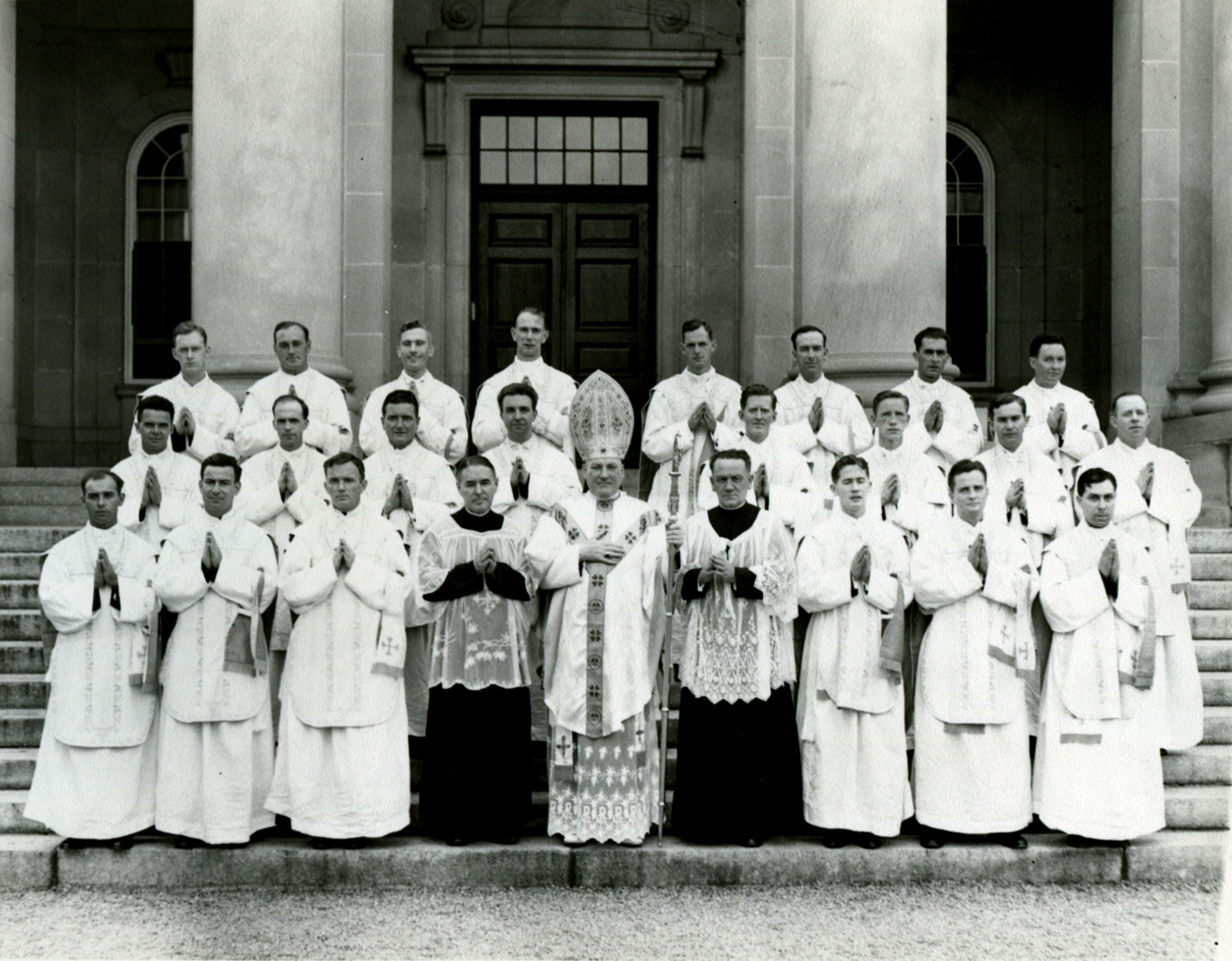
Cardinal Cushing with newly ordained priests (1960)

Cushing received his early education at Perry Public Grammar School in South Boston, as there was no parochial school for boys in Gate of Heaven Parish. A compulsive truant, Cushing dropped out of high school in his freshman year. He subsequently entered Boston College High School, a Jesuit college preparatory school. His cousin, a priest of the Archdiocese of New York, paid Cushing's tuition. He graduated from Boston College High School in 1913, receiving honors for Latin and Greek. Cushing was torn for a time between careers in religion and politics. He originally aspired to be a politician, even earning money by speaking for politicians from the back of wagons. He twice considered joining the Jesuits, but came to the conclusion he "was cut out more for the active life and not the teaching apostolate."

Cushing entered Boston College in 1913 He participated in the Marquette Debating Society and was elected vice-president of his sophomore class. During World War I, the RMS Lusitania was sunk in May 1915 by a German U-boat, killing over 100 Americans. After the sinking, Cushing enlisted in the United States Army. However, due to his asthma, he was medically discharged after a few weeks.

After his rejection by the Army, Cushing finally decided to become a priest. He began his studies for the priesthood at St. John's Seminary in the Brighton section of Boston in September 1915. The archdiocese wanted to send Cushing to Rome to continue his studies at the Pontifical North American College, but the escalation of U-boat activity in the Atlantic Ocean made the trip too dangerous.

== Priesthood ==
On May 26, 1921, Cushing was ordained a priest for the Archdiocese of Boston by Cardinal William Henry O'Connell at the Cathedral of the Holy Cross in Boston. After his ordination, the archdiocese assigned Cushing as a curate at St. Patrick's Parish in the Roxbury neighborhood, where he remained for two months. He was then transferred to St. Benedict's Parish in Somerville, Massachusetts.

In 1922, Cushing appeared unannounced at O'Connell' residence to request an assignment as a missionary. Cushing told O'Connell that he wanted to "take heaven by storm." O'Connell denied his request. Instead, he appointed Cushing as assistant director of the diocesan chapter of the Society for the Propagation of the Faith, an organization dedicated to raising funds for missions. Cushing was promoted to director in 1929. The Vatican elevated Cushing to the rank of monsignor on May 14, 1939.

== Episcopal career ==
=== Auxiliary Bishop of Boston ===
On June 10, 1939, after Auxiliary Bishop Francis Spellman of Boston was named archbishop of New York, Cushing was recommended to the Vatican to replace him. He was appointed as an auxiliary bishop of Boston and titular bishop of Mela by Pope Pius XII. Cushing received his episcopal consecration on June 29, 1939, from O'Connell at the Cathedral of the Holy Cross, with bishops John Bertram Peterson and Thomas Addis Emmet, SJ, serving as co-consecrators. Cushing took as his episcopal motto: Ut Cognoscant Te (Latin: "That they may know thee").

As an auxiliary bishop, Cushing continued to serve as director of the Society for the Propagation of the Faith. He was also named pastor of Sacred Heart Parish in Newton Centre, Massachusetts. Following O'Connell's death in April 1944, Cushing was elected as apostolic administrator of the archdiocese.

=== Archbishop of Boston ===
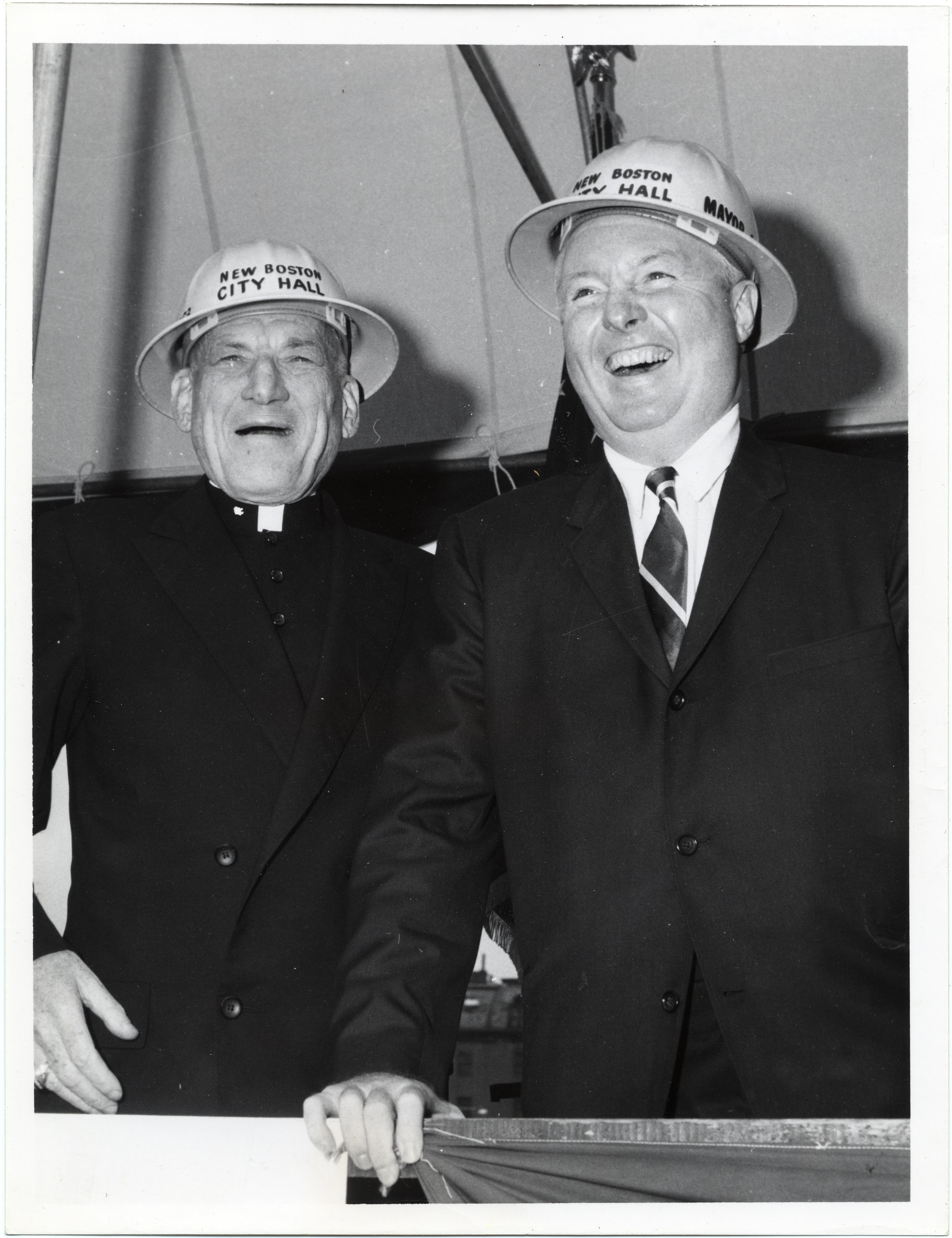
Cardinal Cushing (left) with Boston Mayor John F. Collins at the groundbreaking of Boston City Hall (1963)

Cushing was named the third archbishop of Boston by Pius XII on September 25, 1944, honoring O'Connell's earlier request to the pope that Cushing succeed him.

During his time as archbishop, Cushing oversaw the construction of over 80 chapels and churches in the archdiocese. He saw the need to make it easier for people to worship in different locales. In Boston, he opened the St. Francis Chapel at the Prudential Center for office workers in the Back Bay district and for dock workers the Our Lady of Good Voyage Chapel in South Boston . For travelers, he established Our Lady of the Railways Chapel at South Station in downtown and Our Lady of the Airways Chapel at Logan International Airport in the East Boston district. At the 1969 dedication of the St. Francis Chapel, Cushing told the attendees that he wanted St. Francis to be an "ecumenical chapel. We want people of all faiths to come here and speak to God through their own prayers."

Cushing was a member of the Third Order of St. Francis and the national protector of the Third Order in America. While leading the National Pilgrimage to Lourdes and Rome in 1948, he made a side trip to Assisi, Italy, the birthplace of Saint Francis, Prior to embarking on the trip, he joked that the closest he had ever been to Rome was Castle Island in South Boston. While in France, French Foreign Minister Robert Schuman awarded Cushing the Legion of Honour.

In 1952, Cushing celebrated the first wedding mass broadcast on television. It was held at a special chapel at Station WBZ and was viewed by about 500,000 people in New England.

During Cushing's tenure, Boston would see the excommunication of Reverend Leonard Feeney for repeated refusals to be summoned to Rome. Feeney refused to back down from his position, although it has been reported that he was ultimately reconciled with the Church before his death. Cushing approved the moving of at least two priests into new parishes during the 1960s despite allegations of sexual misconduct.

=== Cardinal ===
Cushing was created cardinal-priest of the Church of Santa Susanna in Rome by Pope John XXIII in the consistory of December 15, 1958. Cushing served as a cardinal elector in the 1963 papal conclave that elected Pope Paul VI.

== Retirement and death ==
Due to advanced illnesses, Cushing's resignation as archbishop of Boston was accepted by Paul VI on September 8, 1970. Remarking on Cushing's retirement, US Senator Ted Kennedy stated:

For three-quarters of a century [Cushing's] life has been a light in a world that cries out for illumination. He will never have to account for his stewardship, for if his goodness is not known to God, no one's ever will be.

On November 2, 1970, All Souls Day, Cushing died of cancer while sleeping at his residence in Brighton at age 75. He was surrounded by his brother and sisters, along with his successor, Archbishop Humberto Medeiros. Cushing was buried in Hanover, Massachusetts, at the Portiuncula Chapel on the grounds of the Cardinal Cushing Centers.

=== Kennedys ===
A close friend of the Kennedy family, Cushing officiated at the marriage of US Senator John F. Kennedy and Jacqueline Lee Bouvier at St. Mary's Church in Newport, Rhode Island, in 1953. During the ceremony, Cushing read a special prayer for the couple from Pius XII. Over the coming years, Cushing baptized many of the Kennedy family children. He delivered the prayer invocation at the 1961 inauguration of Kennedy as president of the United States in Washington.

After Kennedy was assassinated in Dallas, Texas, in November 1963, Cushing officiated at his funeral mass at St. Matthew's Cathedral in Washington. The day before the funeral, he delivered a televised eulogy for Kennedy. Cushing in 1968 defended Jacqueline Kennedy from criticism after she married shipping magnate Aristotle Onassis. As a result, Cushing received a large amount of hate mail and was contradicted by the Vatican.

== Viewpoints ==
=== Interfaith relations ===
Cushing's work contributed to making the Catholic Church acceptable to the general population at the time of Kennedy's candidacy in 1960 for the presidency. Part of this work included reaching out to the non-Catholics of Boston after "the muscular style of involved Catholicism that Cardinal O'Connell brought to bear on issues of his day - religious, social, and political - in Boston and Massachusetts".

After the first meeting between Church and Freemasonry which had been held on April 11, 1969, at the convent of the Divine Master in Ariccia, he was the protagonist of a series of public handshakes between high prelates of the Roman Catholic Church and the heads of Freemasonry.

In 1964, Cushing praised the Protestant evangelist Reverend Billy Graham and encouraged Catholics to attend his crusades.

=== Catholic-Jewish relations ===
From the start of Cushing's tenure as archbishop, he sought closer relations with the Jewish community. The author James Carroll has attributed Cushing's outlook to the marriage between his sister Dolly Cushing and a Jewish man, Dick Pearlstein. According to Carroll, marriages between Jews and Catholics at this time were very uncommon. Cushing made many visits to the couple's house and was on very good terms with Pearlstein.

In November 1948, Cushing became the first Catholic archbishop to address the Union of American Hebrew Congregations at their convention in Boston. He acknowledged that a "staggering" number of Americans held racial and religious prejudices. Cushing attacked communism, fascism and all ideologies that threaten the religious freedom of people.

Cushing was honored by B'nai B'rith as it "Man of the Year" in 1956 for "a lifetime of distinguished service to the cause of human brotherhood under God and in further recognition of great leadership in the fields of education and community relations." He was a close correspondent with Robert E. Segal, executive director of the Jewish Community Relations Council of Boston, who played a key role in improving Jewish-Catholic relations. Cushing also maintained close contacts with Abram L. Sachar, the historian and president of Brandeis University in Waltham, Massachusetts.

=== Communism ===
Cushing strongly condemned Communism. In 1947, the Episcopal clergyman Guy Emery Shipler went with several other ministers to Yugoslavia. As part of their tour, they inspect the cell of imprisoned Archbishop Aloysius Stepinac. After returning to the United States, Shipler said that he saw no proof of religious suppression by the communist regime of President Josip Broz Tito. Cushing condemned this statement, called the group anti-Catholic and accusing them of selling out to Tito.

In an interview in June 1959, during the Cold War between the United States and the Soviet Union, Cushing suggested that American high schools provide courses on communism so that teenagers would learn about its "intrinsic evil." In November of that year, after the Cuban Revolution of 1955 to 1959, Cushing condemned Cuban President Fidel Castro from impounding Catholic revenues in Cuba and suggested that he was a communist. In 1962 Cushing was a member of a fundraising committee organized by the Cuban Families Committee for Liberation of Prisoners of War, which sought to raise money to pay the ransom set by Fidel Castro for the release of those taken captive as a result of the Bay of Pigs Invasion.

=== Nostra aetate ===
At the Second Vatican Council in Rome between 1962 and 1965, Cushing played a vital role in drafting Nostra aetate, the 1965 document that officially exonerated the Jews of killing Christ. His emotional comments during debates over the drafts were echoed in the final version:

We must cast the Declaration on the Jews in a much more positive form, one not so timid, but much more loving ... For the sake of our common heritage we, the children of Abraham according to the spirit, must foster a special reverence and love for the children of Abraham according to the flesh. As children of Adam, they are our kin, as children of Abraham they are Christ's blood relatives. 2. So far as the guilt of Jews in the death of our Savior is concerned, the rejection of the Messiah by His own, is according to Scripture, a mystery—a mystery given us for our instruction, not for our self-exaltation ... We cannot sit in judgement on the onetime leaders of Israel—God alone is their judge. Much less can we burden later generations of Jews with any burden of guilt for the crucifixion of the Lord Jesus, for the death of the Savior of the world, except that universal guilt in which we all have a part ... In clear and unmistakable language, we must deny, therefore, that the Jews are guilty of our Savior's death. .

He was deeply committed to implementing the council's reforms and promoting renewal in the Church.

=== Racism ===
In 1964, Cushing strongly denounced racism, saying that a "racist Christian" was a contradiction. He praised clergy who were participating in the American Civil Rights Movement.

=== War ===
In May 1961, Cushing delivered his Good Friday sermon at the Pentagon in Arlington, Virginia. It was titled "Power - Divine and Human." Speaking during the height of the Cold War, he spoke about how God has great power, but often shows restraint in its use. Nations should do likewise, particularly in the exercise of their military might.

== Miscellaneous ==
- Cushing was a member of the NAACP.
- Cushing founded the Missionary Society of St. James the Apostle in 1958 to "serve the needs of the poorest of the poor in South America".
- Cushing wrote the foreword for the Revised Standard Version Catholic Edition of the Bible, and gave his imprimatur to the Oxford Annotated Bible.

== Legacy ==
=== Named institutions ===
The following institutions were named after Cushing:

- Archbishop Cushing Hall at Boston College in Newton, Massachusetts, housed the Connell School of Nursing. Cushing dedicated it in 1961; it was demolished in 2019.
- Cardinal Cushing Centers in Hanover and Braintree, Massachusetts. In 1947, Cushing founded St. Coletta by the Sea, with sponsorship from the Sisters of St. Francis of Assisi to support developmentally disabled individuals. The organization was renamed after him in 1974.
- Cardinal Cushing College in Brookline, Massachusetts. Founded in 1952, Cushing helped obtain the land for the college. It closed in 1972.
- Cardinal Cushing Library Building at Emmanuel College in Boston
- Cushing Center at Saint Anselm College in Goffstown, New Hampshire was a student union for the college. It was demolished in 2018.
- Cushing House at Boston College in Newton is a residence hall.
- Richard Cardinal Cushing Building at Merrimack Health Methuen Hospital. In 1950, Cushing founded the Bon Secours Hospital. The Cushing Building was named in his honor in 1970.
- Richard Cardinal Cushing Classroom at St. John's Seminary, a theology classroom

=== Other legacies ===
- In 1958, Cushing made a large financial donation to Reverend Oreste Benzi, enabling him to begin construction of Casa Madonna delle Vette, a monastery in Trentino, Italy. As of 2025, it is a hotel operated by the Pope John XXIII Association.
- In 1961 in Santa Cruz (Bolivia), Cushing he left funds for the construction of two schools: The Marista and another that at the beginning was the Cardinal Cushing Institute and then in 1969 the Colegio Cardinal Cushing administered by the religious of Jesus Mary. Cushing held a Eucharistic congress on August 9, 1961, and inaugurated the Christ the Redeemer statue.

== Works ==
In 1959, Cushing published his only book, a biography of Pius XII. It is an almost hagiographic biography, written shortly after the death of the pontiff. Cushing depicted Pius as the "Pope of Peace" who, armed only with the spiritual weapons of his office, triumphed over insidious attacks that seemed about to destroy the center of Christendom.

His other writings included:

- Answering the Call, 1942
- Soldiers of the Cross, 1942
- Native Clergy are the Pillars of the Church, 1943
- The Missions in War and Peace, 1944
- Grey Nuns: An Appeal for Vocations, 1944
- The Battle Against Self, 1945
- The Guide-Posts of the Almighty to Permanent Industrial Peace and Prosperity, 1946
- Restoring all Things in Christ: The Spirit and the Teaching of Pope Pius X, 1946
- Where is Father Hennessey?: Now We Know the Answer, 1946
- The Spiritual Approach to the Atomic Age, 1946
- Notes for the confessors of religious: a collection of excerpts from articles and books on the spiritual direction of sisters prepared for the guidance of ordinary and extraordinary confessors in the Archdiocese of Boston (ad usum privatum), 1946
- The Confraternity of Christian Doctrine, 1947?
- A Novena of Talks on the Our Father, 1947?
- The Third Choice, Americanism: from an address against universal military training, 1948
- The Diamond Jubilee of the Poor Clares in the United States, 1950?
- The Return of the "Other Sheep" to the One Fold of St. Peter, 1957
- A Call to the Laity: Addresses on the Lay Apostolate, 1957
- Meditations for Religious, 1959
- Rendezvous with Revolution 196-
- Questions and Answers on Communism, 1960
- A Seminary for Advanced Vocations, 1960?
- The Purpose of Living, 1960
- The Ecumenical Council and its Hopes, 1960
- The Age of Lay Sanctity, 1960?
- Assorted Prayers 196?
- Spiritual Guideposts, 1960
- Americans Unite!, 1960
- I'm Proud of My Dirty Hands, 1960?
- Moral Values and the American Society: Pastoral Letter, The Holy Season of Lent, 1961 1961
- The Sacraments: Seven Channels of Grace for every State in Life, 1962
- The Mission of the Teacher, 1962
- The Call of the council: Pastoral Letter, 1962
- St. Martin de Porres, 1962
- A Bridge Between East and West, 1963
- Call Me John; A Life of Pope John XXIII, 1963
- Saint Patrick and the Irish, 1963
- Liturgy and Life : First Sunday of Advent, November 1964: Pastoral Letter, 1964
- A Summons to Racial Justice, 1964
- Richard Cardinal Cushing in Prose and Photos, 1965
- Along with Christ, 1965
- "A Quiet Burial" for a Biography, 1965
- The Servant Church, 1966

Articles

- The Church and Philosophy, Proceedings of the American Catholic Philosophical Association, v23 (1949); 9–15
- God's People, Review of Social Economy, v10 n1: 87–89
- The Need for the Study of American Church History, The Catholic Historical Review, v36 n1: 43–46
- Religion in Liberal Arts Education, Christian Education, v30 n1: 13–24

== Episcopal succession ==
Catholic Church titles
Preceded by William Henry O'Connell	Archbishop of Boston; 1944 – 1970	Succeeded by Humberto Sousa Medeiros
