= Acalissus =

Town of ancient Lycia

Coordinates: 36°38′14″N 30°04′20″E

Acalissus or Akalissos (Greek: Ἀκαλισσός or Ἀκαλησσός) was a town of ancient Lycia, an early bishopric, and remains a titular see of the Roman Catholic Church. Coins were minted at Acalissus, some of which are housed at numismatic collections.

Acalissus was situated on the middle course of the river Limyros in the eastern part of the Roman province of Lycia. Stephanus of Byzantium and Hierocles make mention of it. Minor variations in the spelling of its name are found in the records: Ἀκαλισσός, Ἀκαλισός, Ἀκαμισός, Ἀκαλλισσός.

It was for long politically united with Idebessos, its neighbour to the west. The bishopric of Acalissus appears, in a low order of importance, among the suffragans of the metropolitan see of Myra in the Notitia Episcopatuum of Pseudo-Epiphanius, written during the reign of the Byzantine Emperor Heraclius (610–641), and in that of Basil the Armenian, composed between 820 and 842, but is absent in later records. No longer a residential bishopric, Acalissus is today listed by the Catholic Church as a titular see.
