= Jeremiah Francis Minihan =

American Roman Catholic prelate

His Excellency, The Most Reverend Jeremiah Francis Minihan
- Auxiliary Bishop of Boston; Titular Bishop of Paphos
- Church: Catholic Church
- Archdiocese: Boston

Orders
- Ordination: December 21, 1929 by Basilio Pompilj
- Consecration: September 8, 1956 by Richard Cushing

Personal details
- Born: July 21, 1903 Haverhill, Massachusetts, US
- Died: August 14, 1973 (aged 70) Dublin, Ireland
- Education: Georgetown University; Pontifical Urban University
- Motto: Fortitudo et mansuetudo (Strength and meekness)

Jeremiah Francis Minihan (July 21, 1903 – August 14, 1973) was an American prelate of the Roman Catholic Church. He served as an auxiliary bishop of the Archdiocese of Boston from 1954 until his death in 1973.

== Biography ==
=== Early life and education ===
Jeremiah Minihan was born on July 21, 1903, in Haverhill, Massachusetts, one of two sons of Timothy and Nora Agnes (née Duggan) Minihan. His father was from County Cork and his mother from County Kerry, both in Ireland. Jeremiah received his early education at the parochial school of St. James Parish in Haverhill. He then attended Georgetown University in Washington, D.C., graduating in 1925. At Georgetown, he played as a lineman on the Hoyas football team.

Minihan studied at the Pontifical Urban University in Rome, where he earned a Doctor of Theology degree in 1930.

=== Ordination and ministry ===
Minihan was ordained a priest for the Archdiocese of Boston in Rome on December 21, 1929 by Cardinal Basilio Pompilj. Following his return to Massachusetts, the archdiocese assigned Minihan as a curate at St. Paul Parish in Cambridge. He was appointed as assistant chancellor of the archdiocese in 1931 and as secretary to Cardinal William O'Connell in 1933.

The Vatican Minihan was named a monsignor in 1936. In 1943, he was named chancellor of the archdiocese and pastor of St. Catherine Parish in Norwood, Massachusetts He also served as pastor of St. Theresa Parish in Boston, diocesan consultor, synodal judge, and vicar for religious.

=== Auxiliary Bishop of Boston ===
On May 21, 1954, Minihan was appointed as an auxiliary bishop of Boston and titular bishop of Paphos by Pope Pius XII. He received his episcopal consecration at the Cathedral of the Holy Cross in Boston on September 8, 1954. from Cardinal Richard Cushing, with Bishops John Joseph Wright and Vincent Stanislaus Waters serving as co-consecrators. As an auxiliary bishop, he served as regional bishop for the North Pastoral Region of the archdiocese.

== Death and legacy ==
Minihan died on August 14, 1973 at age 70 while vacationing in Dublin, Ireland.

The Jeremiah Minihan Coaches Award is presented by Georgetown University to the student who has made an outstanding contribution to the men's football team.

== Episcopal succession ==
Catholic Church titles
Preceded by –	Auxiliary Bishop of Boston; 1954–1973	Succeeded by –
