= Aghorenath Chattopadhyay =

Indian educationalist (1851–1915)

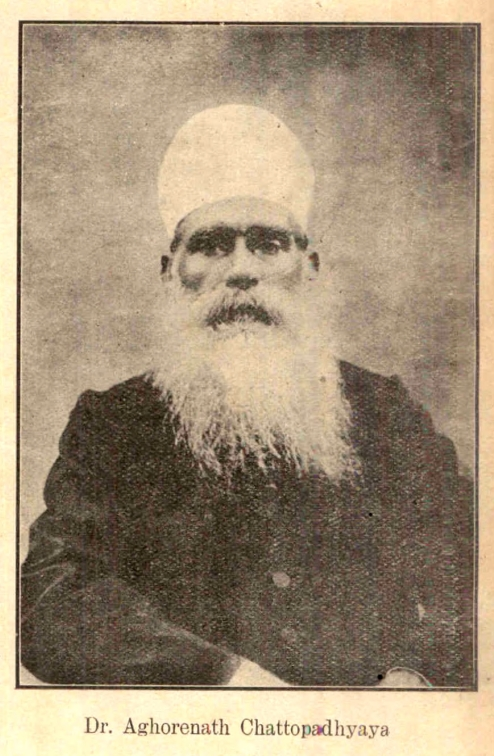
- Born: 31 October 1851; Brahmmangoan, Kanaksar, Bikrampur, Bengal, British India
- Died: 28 January 1915 (aged 63); Calcutta, Bengal, British India
- Spouse: Varada Sundari Devi
- Children: 8, including Sarojini, Virendranath, Harindranath, Suhasini

Aghorenath (also spelt Aghornath) Chattopadhyay (1851–1915) was an Indian educationist and social reformer. The first Indian to secure a D.Sc. (Doctor of Science) degree, he later became the first principal of Nizam College, Hyderabad. The poet and Indian political activist Sarojini Naidu was his eldest daughter.

== Biography ==
=== Early years ===
Aghorenath was born in Bhrahmongaon in Kanaksar Village, Bikrampur (then in Bengal Presidency, now in Bangladesh). After completing his schooling in Dhaka Collegiate School, he spent three and a half years in Presidency College, Kolkata before moving to University of Edinburgh on Gilchrist Scholarship for higher studies. He excelled in his studies and secured the Hope Prize and Baxter Scholarship.

=== Career and Politics ===
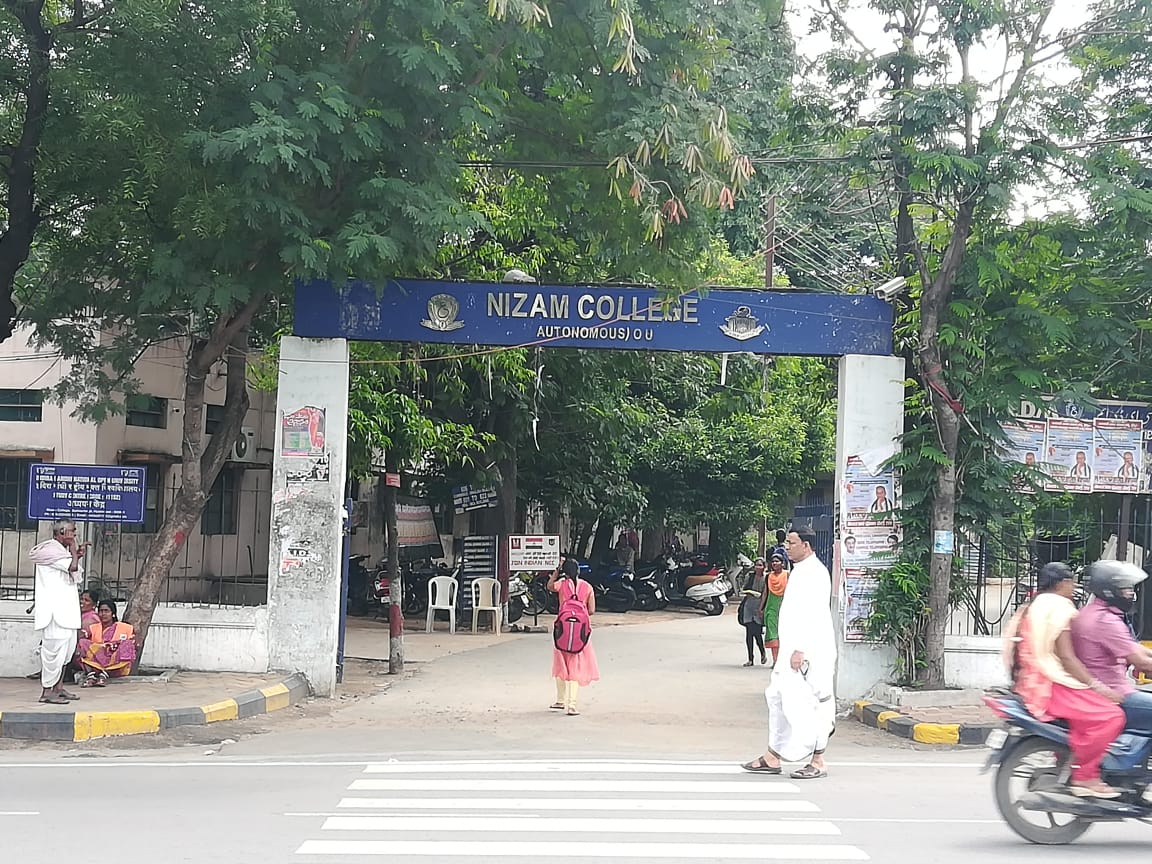
Nizam College, Hyderabad, Telangana

Upon his return to India, he accepted the invitation from Nizam of Hyderabad State to modernise the education system there. He began with an English medium school. With Nizam's support he founded the Hyderabad College with himself its first principal; this later became the Nizam College. Later he initiated efforts to start a College for Women as a part of Osmania University. He was instrumental in implementing the Special Marriage Act, 1872 in the Hyderabad State, which was already in vogue in British India. Aghorenath was a prominent member of the intellectuals' collective of Hyderabad who debated on social political and literary topics. Around this time Aghorenath also got involved in politics.

He had differences of opinion with the Nizam on the Chanda Rail Project and a displeased Nizam suspended him from his job and deported him from Hyderabad on 20 May 1883. However a few years later he was recalled and reinstated. In fact it was the Nizam who later provided a scholarship for Sarojini to pursue her studies in England.

After returning to Hyderabad, Aghorenath continued his political activism and, consequently was forced to retire early and relocate to Kolkata. He and his wife Varada Sundari Devi set up residence at Lovelock Street, Kolkata.

=== Personal life ===
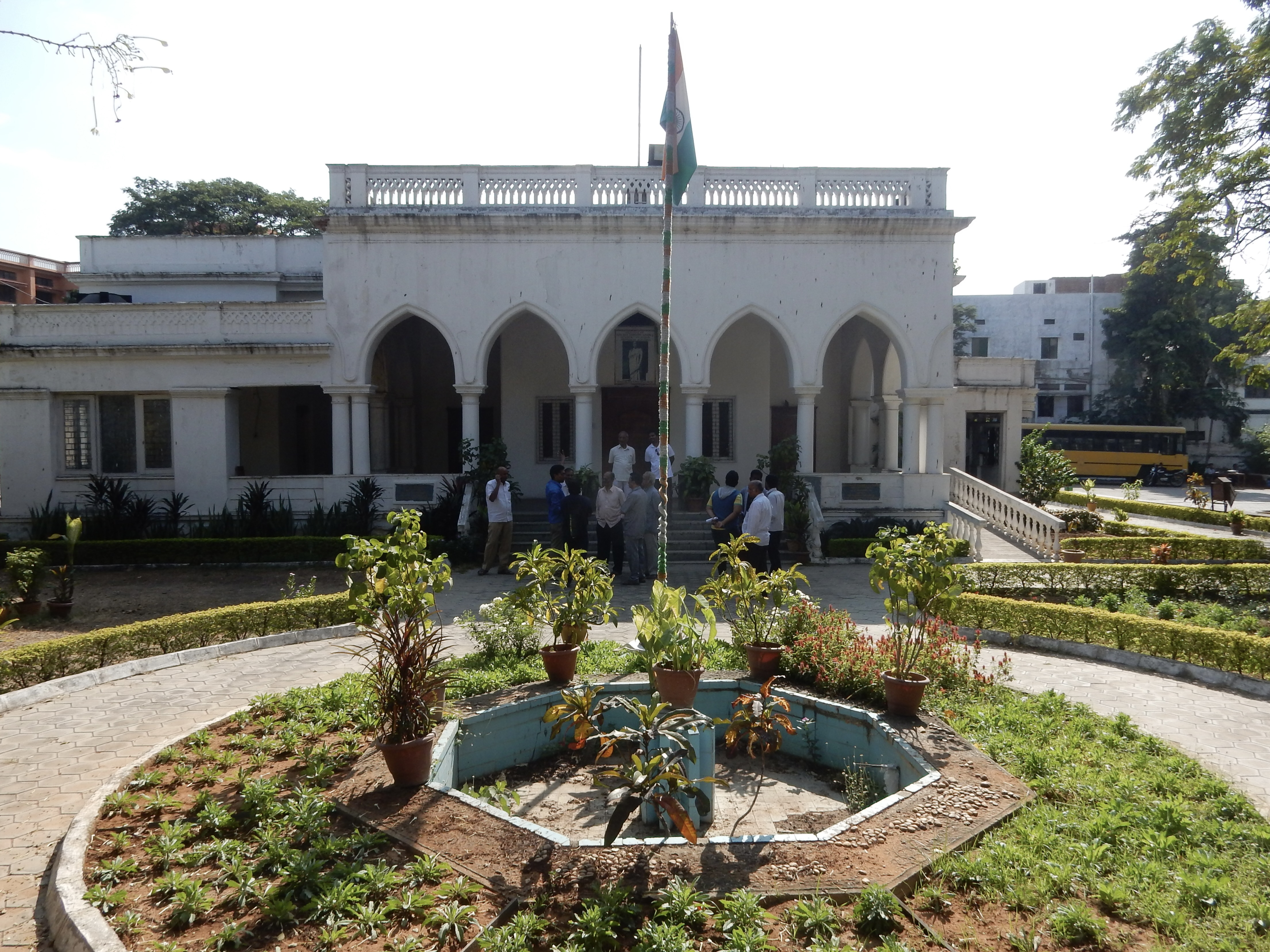
Golden Threshold, Abids, Hyderabad

Aghorenath married Varada Sundari Devi before he left for Edinburgh. During his absence, Sundari was an inmate at the Bharat Ashram, an educational centre run by Keshab Chandra Sen. She accompanied him to Hyderabad in 1878. The couple had 8 children - four daughters and four sons. Sarojini was the eldest. Sarojini described her father as a dreamer and an intellectual with unending curiosity. It was this curiosity that turned him into an alchemist in search of a recipe for gold. After she published her first collection of poems "Golden Threshold", the house where the family stayed in Hyderabad came to be called Golden Threshold. This is currently a museum. Second daughter Mrinalini completed her studies from University of Cambridge and later became the principal of Gangaram Girls' High School, Lahore, which is now known as Lahore College for Women University. Third daughter Sunalini was a Kathak dancer and film actress. Youngest daughter Suhasini was a political activist and first female member of the Indian Communist party. She married A. C. N. Nambiar and they later divorced.

Aghorenath's eldest son Virendranath was a leftist and was in the British Crime register for alleged revolutionary activities. He spent his time in Europe, gathering support for activities against the British. During his stay in Moscow, he fell victim to Stalin's Great Purge and was executed on 2 September 1937. Youngest son Harindranath was an activist, poet and actor. He received the Indian civilian award Padma Bhushan in 1973.

=== Death ===
Aghorenath died at his Lovelock Road residence on 28 January 1915.
