= Padmini Sathianadhan Sengupta =

Indian author, Journalist (1905–1988)

- Born: 1905
- Died: 1988 (aged 82–83)
- Occupations: Author, Journalist and historian

Padmini Sathianadhan Sengupta (1905–1988) was an Indian author, Journalist and historian known for her contributions to Indian literature and historical writings. She authored a biography titled “Makers of Indian Literature”, focusing on the life and achievements of the poet and freedom fighter Sarojini Naidu.

== Early life ==
Padmini Sengupta was born in 1910 in India. She pursued higher education in India, which provided her with a strong foundation in literary and historical studies. The educational environment of the time, coupled with the nationalistic fervor and the Indian independence movement, likely played a role in shaping her perspectives and interests.

== Selected works ==
She authored several books, primarily focusing on Indian history and culture. Some of her works include:

- Makers of Indian Literature - focusing on the life and achievements of the poet and freedom fighter Sarojini Naidu.
- The Story of Karuvaki - A historical novel about Karuvaki, the second wife of the Mauryan Emperor Ashoka.
- Indian Women - Profiles the lives of notable women in Indian history, highlighting their achievements and contributions to society.
- Rebel With a Cause: The Life and Work of Dr. Satyajit Ray - Details the life of the famous Indian filmmaker Satyajit Ray, providing insights into his work and legacy.
