= Harindranath Chattopadhyay =

Indian poet (1898–1990)

- Harindranath Chattopadhyay

Member of Parliament, Lok Sabha
- In office 1952–1957
- Preceded by: First Election
- Succeeded by: Komarraju Atchamamba
- Constituency: Vijayawada

Personal details
- Born: 2 April 1898 Hyderabad, Hyderabad State, British India
- Died: 23 June 1990 (aged 92) Bombay, Maharashtra, India
- Spouses: Kamaladevi Chattopadhyaya (m. 1923–1955); Sundari Rani Chattopadhyaya (m. 1962–1990)
- Children: 2
- Relatives: Sarojini Naidu (sister)

Harindranath Chattopadhyay (2 April 1898 – 23 June 1990) was an Indian English poet, dramatist, actor, musician, and a member of the 1st Lok Sabha from Vijayawada constituency. He was the younger brother of Sarojini Naidu, the second woman President of the Indian National Congress and first Indian woman to hold the position, and Virendranath Chattopadhyay, an international communist revolutionary. The Government of India awarded him the civilian honour of the Padma Bhushan in 1973.

== Life ==
Chattopadhyay, a poet and singer, is famous for poems such as Noon and Shaper Shaped. His father Aghorenath Chattopadhyay earned a Doctorate of Science from the University of Edinburgh, and settled in Hyderabad State, where he founded and acted as head of the Hyderabad College, which later became the Nizam's College in Hyderabad. Harindranath's mother was a poet and used to write poetry in Bengali. His other interests were politics, music, theatre and cinema.

His first book of poems, The Feast of Youth, was published when he was 19 years old, and received praise from Arthur Quiller-Couch and James Henry Cousins. He wrote in English but of topics relating to ancient Indian culture and Vedic ideas.

He was awarded Padma Bhushan in 1973. He married Kamaladevi Chattopadhyaya, a socialist and leader of women, who created the All India Women's Conference, the Indian Cooperative Union, and also was the inspiration for the All India Handicrafts Board, a body which revived many Indian handicrafts (such as pottery and weaving) decimated by the Industrial Revolution in Britain in the 19th century. They had two sons together, one of which died in 2008. Kamaladevi and Harin's divorce was the first legal separation granted by the courts of India. It was amicable.

Harindranath Chattopadhyay often recited his poem Rail Gaadi on All India Radio (Akashavani). The song was memorably sung by Ashok Kumar in the film Aashirwad. He himself wrote the lyrics, composed the music and sang a few songs, notable among which were Surya Ast Ho Gaya and Tarun Arun Se Ranjit Dharani. He penned the first English song in any Hindi film, and it became an all time hit – "My Heart Is Beating" – in Julie, which launched the playback singing career of Preeti Sagar. He also wrote a number of poems for children in Hindi. His poems were appreciated by the Nobel Laureate Rabindranath Tagore.

In 1951 Lok Sabha elections, Harindranath Chattopadhyay won from Vijayawada Lok Sabha constituency in Madras State as an independent candidate, supported by the Communist Party of India. He was a member of the 1st Lok Sabha from 14 April 1952 to 4 April 1957.

His most famous acting role was in the Hindi movie Bawarchi (The Chef), which was made in 1972. It was adapted by Hrishikesh Mukherjee from the Bengali film Galpo Holeo Satti, directed by Tapan Sinha. Chattopadhyay played the role of the strict and regimented patriarch of the house, where his sons, daughters-in-law and grandchildren lived in a joint family and still respected and abided by his rules. He had cameos in three Satyajit Ray films: playing the wizard Barfi in Goopy Gyne Bagha Byne; the human encyclopaedia, Sidhujyatha, in Sonar Kella; and the senior member of the Board of Directors, Sir Baren Roy, in Seemabaddha.

He also acted in the 1984 Mumbai Doordarshan TV Serial Ados Pados. Amol Palekar was the protagonist in this serial.

Chattopadhyay died of cardiac arrest on 23 June 1990 in Bombay.

== Poems ==
The Earthen Goblet is one of Chattopadhyay's poems. The poem is written in a conversational tone. The poet presents a dialogue between the goblet and the narrator. The narrator asks the red goblet to recount its experiences as it is moulded by the potter. When the potter made this goblet, he used all his skills and made the beautiful goblet which was full of impulse. The Potter worked hard with the clay and the clay enjoyed the fragrant companionship of the little flower and the unshapely earth which the potter has taken away.

Fire is one of Chattopadhyay's tragic poems. In this poem a newly born baby asks a question to leaping flames. In fact, the infant's deceased mother had been set on fire and the child asked their question to the flames. The fire already consumed the dead mother and unveiled life in its lonely nakedness. The fire then answers that it is the terrible desire that shaped the infant in his mother's womb.

Beside the Death Bed is an example of his philosophical poetry. In this poem, Chattopadhyay says that death is the highest bidder and life is the lowest, this being his explanation as to why there is strife in life. According to the poem, man is the coffin of life, and life is the cradle of death.

Sorrow is a short poem. The small piece brings attention to the importance of sorrow being from a creator. The poem says a person who has lost his lover realizes deep and intense sorrow. It uses the symbolic image of a dove as the Holy Spirit.

Futurity gives yet another genre of writing explored by Chattopadhyay's poetry. Here, man is presented in unique form. According to the poem, time is the womb of eternity. Each man is compared to a foetus. All birth is yet to be born since man is unfinished and still in the making, and the foetus is awaiting the time to be born.

Shaper Shaped is marked by its stark simplicity. The narrative voice shows how the shaper has been shaped into the objects which he used to shape earlier. A potter shapes the clay and thus can make a beautiful pot. The narrator praises his work of art. At the end of the poem, the narrator kneels at the feet of a supreme power, who is identified at the one who created the potter himself.

== Works ==
=== Poems ===
- The Feast of Youth (1918)
- The Magic Tree (1922)
- Ancient Wings (1923)
- Blood of Stones (1944)
- Spring in Winter (1955)
- Virgin and Vineyards (1967)
- The Lady's Giant Hat
- The Earthen Goblet
- Salute to R-day
- Tati Tati Tota (in Hindi)
- Voyage
- Things I Love (in English)
- Curious Town (in English)
- The Duck (in English)

=== Songs ===
- Surya Ast Ho Gaya
- Tarun Arun Se Ranjit Dharani
- My Heart is Beating (from Julie)

=== Plays ===
- Abu Hassan (1918)
- Five Plays (1937)
- Siddhartha, Man of Peace (1956)

== Filmography ==
Year	Title	Role	Notes
1962	Sahib Bibi Aur Ghulam	Gharhi Babu	
1963	Tere Ghar Ke Samne	Seth Karam Chand	
1963	The Householder	Mr. Chaddha	
1964	Sanjh Aur Savera	Mama, Radha's uncle	
1965	Teen Devian	Mr. Pinto	
1965	Shreeman Funtoosh	Mr. Verma	
	Bhoot Bangla	Doctor	
1966	Pyar Mohabbat	Thakur Shamsher Singh	
1966	Pinjre Ke Panchhi	Father of Miss India 1965	
1967	Raaz	Baba	
1967	Raat Aur Din	Dr. Dey	
1967	Naunihal	Deranged male in Bombay	
1968	Abhilasha	Albert D'Souza	
1968	Aashirwad	Baiju 'Dholakia'	
1969	Goopy Gyne Bagha Byne	The Magician (Barfi)	Bengali film
1971	Seemabaddha	Sir Baren Roy	Bengali film
1972	Bawarchi	Shiv Nath Sharma (Daduji)	
1973	Agni Rekha	Baba	
1974	Gupt Gyan	Professor #1	
1974	Sonar Kella	Sidhu Jyatha (Uncle Sidhu)	Bengali film
1974	Raja Shiv Chhatrapati		
1974	Aashiana		
1976	Mehbooba	Rita's father	
1976	Mera Jiwan	Doctor in village	
1977	Chala Murari Hero Banne	Harindranath Chattopadhyay	
1978	Ankhiyon Ke Jharokhon Se	Mr. Rodriques	
1981	Ghungroo Ki Awaaz	Nawab Jung Bahadur	
1982	Chalti Ka Naam Zindagi	Mastermind behind spooking everyone	
1984	Hořký podzim s vůní manga	Rádz's grandfather	
1985	Phir Aayee Barsat	Hiren Chacha	
1988	Maalamaal	Shri Mangat Ram	(final film role)
