= Nightingale of India =

Nightingale of India is a nickname and may refer to:

- Sarojini Naidu (1879–1949), political activist and poet
- Lata Mangeshkar (1929–2022), playback singer and occasional music composer
- K. S. Chithra (born 1963), playback singer, known as the "Nightingale of South India"
- S. Janaki (1938–2026), playback singer and occasional music composer, known as the "Nightingale of India" or "Nightingale of South India"
