= Kamaladevi Chattopadhyay =

Indian freedom fighter (1903–1988)

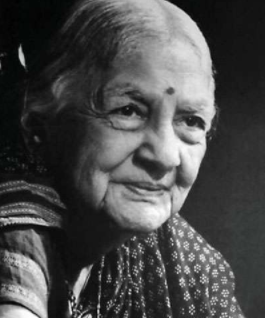
- Born: 3 April 1903; Mangalore, Madras Presidency (in present-day Karnataka), British India
- Died: 29 October 1988 (aged 85); Mumbai, Maharashtra, India
- Education: Queen Mary's College, Bedford College (London)
- Spouses: Krishna Rao (m. 1917–1919) Harindranath Chattopadhyay (m. 1923–1955)
- Children: 1
- Awards: Ramon Magsaysay Award (1966); Padma Bhushan (1955); Sangeet Natak Akademi Fellowship (1974); Padma Vibhushan (1987)

Kamaladevi Chattopadhyay (3 April 1903 – 29 October 1988) was an Indian social reformer. She worked for the promotion of Indian handicrafts, handlooms, and theatre in independent India to uplift the socio-economic standard of Indian women. She was the first woman in India to contest elections from Madras Constituency, but lost.

She headed the National School of Drama and Sangeet Natak Akademi. In 1974, she was awarded the Sangeet Natak Akademi Fellowship, the highest honour conferred by the Sangeet Natak Academy, India's National Academy of Music, Dance & Drama. The Government of India bestowed on her Padma Bhushan and Padma Vibhushan in 1955 and 1987, respectively. She is known as Hatkargha Maa for her work in the handloom sector.

== Biography ==
=== Early life ===
Born in a Saraswat Brahmin family on 3 April 1903 in Mangaluru, Karnataka, Kamaladevi was the fourth and youngest daughter of her parents. Her father, Ananthayya Dhareshwar, was the District Collector of Mangalore, and her mother, Girijabai, from whom she inherited an independent streak, belonged to a land-owning Chitrapur Saraswat Brahmin family from coastal Karnataka. Kamaladevi's paternal grandmother was well-versed in the ancient Indian epics and puranas, and Girijabai was also well-educated, although mostly home-tutored. Together, their presence in the household gave Kamaladevi a firm grounding and provided benchmarks to respect for her intellect as well as her voice, something that she came to be known for in the future.

Kamaladevi was an exceptional student and also exhibited qualities of determination and courage from an early age. Her parents befriended many prominent freedom fighters and intellectuals such as Mahadev Govind Ranade, Gopal Krishna Gokhale, and women leaders like Ramabai Ranade and Annie Besant. This made young Kamaladevi an early enthusiast of the swadeshi nationalist movement.

She studied about the ancient Sanskrit drama tradition of Kerala - Kutiyattam, from its greatest Guru and authority of Abhinaya, Nātyāchārya Padma Shri Māni Mādhava Chākyār by staying at the Guru's home at Killikkurussimangalam.

=== First marriage and widowhood ===
She was married in 1917 at the age of 14, but was widowed two years later.

=== 1920s ===
==== Marriage to Harindranath ====
Meanwhile, studying in Queen Mary's College in Chennai, she came to know Suhasini Chattopadhyay, a fellow student and the younger sister of Sarojini Naidu, who later introduced Kamaladevi to their talented brother, Harindranath Chattopadhyay (née Harin), by then a well-known poet-playwright-actor. It was their mutual interest in the arts that brought them together.

Finally, when she was twenty years old, Kamaladevi married Harin, much to the opposition of the orthodox society of the time, which was still heavily against widow marriage. L Harin and Kamaladevi stayed together to pursue common dreams, which wouldn't have been possible otherwise, and in spite of many difficulties, they were able to work together to produce plays and skits. The couple had a son, Ramakrishna Chattopadhyay, known as Rama, born in 1923. and they got divorced in 1933.

Later, she also acted in a few films, in an era when acting was considered unsuitable for women from respectable families. In her first stint, she acted in two silent films, including the first silent film of Kannada film industry, Vasantsena (1930), based on the famous play by Shudraka, also starring Enakshi Rama Rao, and directed by pioneering director Mohan Bhavnani. In her second stint in films, she acted in a 1943 Hindi film, Tansen, also starring K. L. Saigal and Khursheed, followed by Shankar Parvati (1943), and Dhanna Bhagat (1945).

==== Move to London ====
Shortly after their marriage, Harin left for London, on his first trip abroad, and a few months later Kamaladevi joined him, where she joined Bedford College, University of London, and later she received a diploma in Sociology.

==== Call of the freedom movement ====
While still in London, Kamaladevi came to know of Mahatma Gandhi's Non-Cooperation Movement in 1923, and she promptly returned to India to join the Seva Dal, a Gandhian organisation set up to promote social upliftment. Soon she was placed in charge of the women's section of the Dal, where she got involved in recruiting, training and organising girls and women of all ages women across India to become voluntary workers, 'sevikas'.

In 1926, she met the suffragette Margaret E. Cousins, the founder of All India Women's Conference (AIWC), who inspired her to run for the Madras Provincial Legislative Assembly. Thus, she became the first woman to run for a legislative seat in India. Though she could campaign for only a few days, she lost by a small margin of 55 votes.

==== The All-India Women's Conference ====
In the following year, she became a founding member of the All-India Women's Conference (AIWC) and was its first Organising Secretary. In the following years, AIWC grew to become a national organisation of repute, with branches and voluntary programs run throughout the nation, and work steadfastly for legislative reforms. During her tenure, she travelled extensively to many European nations and was inspired to initiate several social reform and community welfare programs, and set up educational institutions run for and by women. It contributed to the formation of Lady Irwin College for Home Sciences in New Delhi.

=== 1930s ===
Later she was a part of the seven-member lead team, announced by Mahatma Gandhi, in the famous Salt Satyagraha (1930), to prepare Salt at the Bombay beachfront; the only other woman volunteer in the team was Avantikabai Gokhale. Later in a startling move, Kamaladevi went up to a nearby Mumbai High Court and asked a magistrate present there whether he would be interested in buying the "Freedom Salt" she had just prepared.

On 26 January 1930, she gained widespread media attention when, in a scuffle, she clung to the Indian tricolour to protect it.

=== 1940s ===
When World War II broke out, Kamaladevi was in England, and she immediately began a world tour to represent India's situation to other countries and drum up support for Independence after the war.

While on this tour, she journeyed across the southern United States. In 1941, she boarded a segregated train. In Louisiana, a conductor tried to remove her from a car reserved for white passengers. Upon realising that she was not a Black American, the conductor reportedly grew confused about how he should proceed and asked her where she was from. To her first answer, "New York," he pressed to learn "which land [she hailed] from," to which she reportedly responded: "It makes no difference. I am a colored woman obviously, and it is unnecessary for you to disturb me for I have no intention of moving from here." The conductor left her sitting in that train car.

After returning from England, Kamaladevi and Harindranath worked towards establishing a theatre group. In this endeavour, they were joined by G. Venkatachellum. Some short plays were based on the lives of Maharashtrian saints such as Tukaram, Jayadev, Eknath, Saku Bai and Pundalik and were performed in Bombay, Madras (Chennai), Pune, Bangalore to packed halls. They also staged plays based on social themes - 'Returned from Abroad', ' New Toy Cart', 'Black Ship'. Kamaladevi performed in these plays and in 1944 she set up the Indian National Theatre (INT) in Bombay (now Mumbai). Its most popularly known production was Nehru's "Discovery of India" produced by Shanti Bardhan.

==== Post-independence work ====
Independence of India brought Partition in its wake, and she plunged into rehabilitation of the refugees. Her first task was to set up the Indian Cooperative Union to help with rehabilitation, and through the Union she made plans for a township on cooperative lines. At length Jawahar Lal Nehru reluctantly gave her permission on the condition that she did not ask for state assistance, and so after much struggle, the township of Faridabad was set up, on the outskirts of Delhi, rehabilitating over 50,000 refugees from the Northwest Frontier. She worked tirelessly in helping the refugees to establish new homes and new professions; for this they were trained in new skills. She also helped set up health facilities in the new town.

Thus began the second phase of her life's work in rehabilitation of people as well as their lost crafts. She was considered single-handedly responsible for the great revival of Indian handicrafts and handloom in the post-independence era, and is considered her greatest legacy to modern India.

=== 1950s and beyond ===
Around this time, she became concerned about the possibility that the introduction of Western methods of factory-based (machinery) mass production in India as part of Nehru's vision for India's development would affect traditional artisans, especially women in the unorganised sectors. She set up a series of crafts museums to hold and archive India's indigenous arts and crafts that served as a storehouse for indigenous know-how. This included the National Crafts Museum in Delhi.

She promoted arts and crafts, and instituted the National Awards for Master Craftsmen, and she set up Central Cottage Industries Emporia throughout the nation.

In 1964, she started the Natya Institute of Kathak and Choreography (NIKC), Bangalore, under the aegis of Bharatiya Natya Sangh, affiliated to UNESCO. Its present director is dancer Maya Rao.

Chattopadhyay was a woman ahead of her time; she was instrumental in setting up the All India Handicrafts Board, and was also its first chairperson. She helped to establish the Delhi Craft Council, the Crafts Council of India and the World Crafts Council (WCC). She was the first president of the WCC's Asia Pacific Region.

Chattopadhyay chaired the National School of Drama and later headed the Sangeet Natak Akademi, and was also a member of UNESCO. Her autobiography, Inner Recesses and Outer Spaces: Memoir was published in 1986. She died on 29 October 1988 in Bombay, aged 85.

== Awards and recognition ==
The Government of India conferred on her the Padma Bhushan in 1955, and the Padma Vibhushan in 1987, which are among the most revered civilian awards of the Republic of India. She was awarded the Ramon Magsaysay Award in 1966 for Community Leadership. In 1974, she was awarded the Sangeet Natak Akademi Fellowship, Ratna Sadasya, in recognition of her lifetime's work. The Fellowship is the highest award of Sangeet Natak Akademi, India's National Academy of Music, Dance and Drama.

UNESCO honoured her with an award in 1977 for her contribution towards the promotion of handicrafts. Shantiniketan honoured her with the Desikottama, its highest award. In 1988, she was conferred with the Charles Eames Award (instituted by NID Ahmedabad)

On 3 April 2018, on what would have been her 115th birthday, Google honoured her with a Doodle on their homepage.

== Books by Kamaladevi Chattopadhyay ==
- The Awakening of Indian women, Everyman's Press, 1939.
- Japan-its weakness and strength, Padma Publications 1943.
- Uncle Sam's empire, Padma publications Ltd, 1944.
- In war-torn China, Padma Publications, 1944.
- Towards a National theatre, (All India Women's Conference, Cultural Section. Cultural books), Aundh Pub. Trust, 1945.
- America,: The land of superlatives, Phoenix Publications, 1946.
- At the Cross Roads, National Information and Publications, 1947.
- Socialism and Society, Chetana, 1950.
- Tribalism in India, Brill Academic Pub, 1978, ISBN 0706906527.
- Handicrafts of India, Indian Council for Cultural Relations & New Age International Pub. Ltd., New Delhi, India, 1995. ISBN 99936-12-78-2.
- Indian Women's Battle for Freedom. South Asia Books, 1983. ISBN 0-8364-0948-5.
- Indian Carpets and Floor Coverings, All India Handicrafts Board, 1974.
- Indian embroidery, Wiley Eastern, 1977.
- India's Craft Tradition, Publications Division, Ministry of I & B, Govt. of India, 2000. ISBN 81-230-0774-4.
- Indian Handicrafts, Allied Publishers Pvt. Ltd, Bombay India, 1963.
- Traditions of Indian Folk Dance.
- The Glory of Indian Handicrafts, New Delhi, India: Clarion Books, 1985.
- Inner Recesses, Outer Spaces: Memoirs, 1986. ISBN 81-7013-038-7.

== Books on Kamaladevi Chattopadhyay ==
- Sakuntala Narasimhan, Kamaladevi Chattopadhyay. New Dawn Books, 1999. ISBN 81-207-2120-9.
- S.R. Bakshi, Kamaladevi Chattopadhyaya : Role for Women's Welfare, Om, 2000, ISBN 81-86867-34-1.
- Reena Nanda, Kamaladevi Chattopadhyaya: A Biography (Modern Indian Greats), Oxford University Press, USA, 2002, ISBN 0-19-565364-5.
- Jamila Brij Bhushan, Kamaladevi Chattopadhyaya – Portrait of a Rebel, Abhinav Pub, 2003. ISBN 81-7017-033-8.
- M.V. Narayana Rao (Ed.), Kamaladevi Chattopadhyay: A True Karmayogi. The Crafts Council of Karnataka: Bangalore. 2003
- Malvika Singh, The Iconic Women of Modern India – Freeing the Spirit. Penguin, 2006, ISBN 0-14-310082-3.
- Jasleen Dhamija, Kamaladevi Chattopadhyay, National Book Trust, 2007. ISBN 8123748825
- Indra Gupta , India's 50 Most Illustrious Women. ISBN 81-88086-19-3.
