= The Golden Threshold =

Anthology of poems

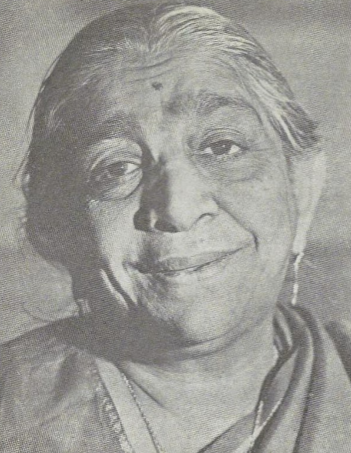
Author, Sarojini Naidu

The Golden Threshold is an anthology of poems written by the Indian political activist and poet Sarojini Naidu. The text was published in 1905 when Naidu was only 26 years old. The selection of poems within The Golden Threshold were inspired by her own life and are written in English diction. The poems present a variety of themes, including among others romance, nature and spirituality. Naidu utilizes them to express orientalism, cosmopolitan nationalism, and Indian feminization. She meticulously chose her words to shed light on significant issues that resided within her culture, paving the way for her political career.

Shortly after providing a voice for silenced women through her poetry, Naidu entered the political realm. In 1914, Gandhi and Naidu gathered for the very first time in London to discuss protests against British enactment that would tax Indian people and force them to carry passes. The reunion would lead them to the establishment of their friendship. Her relationship with Gandhi influenced the approach she would take in her political life as she worked very closely with him. In 1925 Naidu became the first woman President of the Indian National Congress.

== Contents ==
=== Folk songs ===
- Palanquin-Bearers
- Wandering Singers
- Indian Weavers
- Coromandel Fishers
- The Snake Charmer
- Corn Grinders
- The Village Song
- In Praise of Henna
- Harvest Hymn
- Indian Love-Song
- Cradle-Song
- Suttee

=== Songs for music ===
- Song of a Dream
- Humayun to Zobeida
- Autumn Song
- Alabaster
- Ecstasy
- To my Fairy Fancies

=== Poems ===
- Ode to the H.H. the Nizam of Hyderabad
- Leili
- In the Forest
- Past and Future
- Life
- The Poet's Love-Song
- To the God of Pain
- The Song of Princess Zeb-un-nissa
- Indian Dancers
- My Dead Dream
- Damayanti to Nala in the Hour of Exile
- The Queen's Rival
- The Poet to Death
- The Indian Gypsy
- To my Children
- The Pardah Nashin
- To Youth
- Nightfall in the City of Hyderabad
- Street Cries
- To India
- The Royal Tombs of Golconda
- To a Buddah seated on a Lotus

== Literary devices ==
=== Poetical ideologies ===
Naidu's The Golden Threshold “explicitly situates against the ideology that poetic concerns are private ones”. Naidu's lyric is not of private telling as her work is far less personal but rather on board with public concerns. Her public recitation of her books poetry “evinces a communal function, ”painting herself as a "poet of the people". Her refusal of the private poetic ideology serves her poetry's relevance between the literary form between individualism and communitarianism. Rather than keeping her poetry separate from the spheres of personal and political issues, Naidu took on poetry as her form of activism. She "intentionally blurred the established boundaries between political rhetoric and lyric poetry". Naidu's poetry served as her outlet to simultaneously showcase the pride she had in her culture and promote cosmopolitan nationalism, using her personal experiences to then speak on broader political issues.

=== Literary identifications ===
In The Golden Threshold, Naidu positions herself "as a colonial subject caught in the pull of competing identifications". Naidu attempts to reinstate her identity "as an Indian-English poet working within English literary traditions". while still being able to claim herself “as an Indian poet of an Indian nation writing for the Indian ‘people'".

=== Poetic form ===
Naidu uses poetic form in conjunction with her means of political ideologies to create an “abstract measure of the nation”. Naidu's poetic form aims to build the nation and showcase the work her community has done respectively.

== Ties to decadence and orientalism ==
=== Sensuality regarding decadence ===
==== Critique of Naidu's use of the senses ====
Many critics, such as Symons, view Sarojini Naidu's poetry as decadent through “agony of sensation.” The idea of “agony of sensation” refers to Naidu's unique and unconventional style of writing driven by her “pain or pleasure [that] transported her,” allowing her to encapsulate strong emotions through contrasting objects such as anger to “a flower’s cup” often romanticizing negative emotions.) “Symmons also seems to suggest that these objects Naidu writes about never “seemed of importance” to “others,” essentially claiming her emphasis on certain subjects was possibly misplaced. This interpretation often labels the work as overly sensual or discredits its descriptive power because of interpretations such as Symons claiming women are “overly sensitive.” This essentially creates a misogynistic and problematic atmosphere because it allows women of color to be scrutinized for implementing powerful descriptive diction in their poetry and writing it off as the author being “easily excitable”. Many then also question if Naidu's poetry was intentionally an act of “self-orientalisation” simply because her poetry was written in a different cultural context or background. The common conclusion to this question revolves around the idea that Symons encouraged Naidu to incorporate aspects of orientalism into her writing to make her writing intriguing and unknown to a Western audience.

=== Decadent aesthetic through rasa ===
==== What is rasa? ====
Rasa is an Indian aesthetic theory that focuses on “the emotional response to a work of art”. Although Naidu's poems are written in English, her stylistic choices are “deeply embedded in Indian aesthetics and cultural tradition,” which plays a significant role in why her poems are often misinterpreted and overly romanticized by Western culture, thus Symons. Hoene claims that Naidu essentially is tied to orientalism because of her Indian traditionalist style of writing while her ties to decadence stem from her ability to evoke sensuality through perception regarding the essence and beauty of describing Indian culture.

=== Decadent aspects and origins for inspiration ===
Naidu draws inspiration from her roots in Hyderabad (her home city), often discussing its beauty and mystical qualities. She emphasizes the senses through her life experience, which she describes as “dramatic” and full of “fiery beauty”. She depicts the sensuality of “colour, music, perfume” and “vivid human faces” she has experienced in Hyderabad. The sensuality she describes in her poetry is then translated and recognized by Western culture as decadence because of its indulgence and romanticization of the physical.

== Naidu as a nationalist author ==
Naidu's work as an author prior to her nationalist and political work constructs the discrepancies in the critiques of The Golden Threshold work by English critics. The “flattering” reviews made by Arthur Symons and Eunice Tiejens emphasized the representation of the orient as presented in The Golden Threshold in Naidu's prosec.

The New Republic's review of The Golden Threshold highlighted lack of orientalism despite Nadiu being a Hindu woman. M.K. Naik elaborated upon the inadequate representation of the orient and Naidu's language hybridity as an Indian and English writer.

Naidu's poetic voice was influenced by her colonialism, racism, and the critical reading of her work as related to her feminism. In 1986 Naidu's writing was noticed by Edumund Gossse, who constructed a program that orientalized and influenced Naidu's technical writing skills to make them more appealing to English critics.

The Golden Threshold illustrates Naidu's work as a nationalist in poems such as; “Eastern Dancers” and “Nightfall in the City of Hyderabad”, that exemplify the orient through Naidu's interpretation and commemorate Indian tradition, as Naidu was influenced by folk traditions. The poem “To India” nuances nationalism and patriotism, though the hybridity of her language as a poet. While the Decadence of Naidu's work is related to her collaboration with Symons and his acquaintances.

In 1915, Bombay, Naidu supported home rule at the Indian National Congress, encouraging unity to India's diverse populations contenting for self-government, and Indian unity. Naidu's work after the publishing of The Golden Threshold indicates more clearly her political action and advocacy for India's unity.

Critics analyze Naidu through her limitations in her stance as a feminist, within the political context.

== Naidu as a translingual subject ==
The fact that The Golden Threshold is written in English is an example of how Naidu uses the language to challenge Western colonial ideology rather than as a tool of assimilation. According to Dr. Ana Parejo Vadillo, Naidu was "conscious of the fact that the English language was a colonial instrument". Early in her literary career, she had translated Persian poetry for English-speaking readers and published poetry with Persian titles in English magazines. She took inspiration from decadent women poets such as Nur-Jahan and Zeb-Un-Nissa while writing poems to be included in The Golden Threshold. Poems in the collection such as “The Song of Princess Zeb-Un-Nissa In Praise Of Her Own Beauty” exemplify both Naidu's inspiration from these poets and her refusal to reinvent herself as an Orientalist subject for English audiences. In Vadillo's reading of “The Song of Princess Zeb-Un-Nissa,” Naidu refuses to lift her veil to the suitor as a representation of how Naidu likewise refuses to unveil herself to the audience who "want[s] to recognize her as an authentic Indian (and not an English) poet". Additionally, Padillo argues that the English title of the collection itself is a symbol, representing a translingual imagining of the world as it evokes a borderless liminal space. By doing so, Naidu is able to affirm Decadence as an Indian literary movement.

== The Golden Threshold and Naidu’s work as an Indian nationalist and politician ==
Evaluations of The Golden Threshold fail to recognize Naidu's request to not untangle her poetry and politics, her stance in the public and private sector, and her work as a cosmopolitan and nationalists. The circulation of her poems and herself as a writer were aimed to address and challenge the separation of her spheres as she intended to use her poetry to intentionally blur the boundaries between political rhetoric and lyric poetry.
