= Golden Threshold =

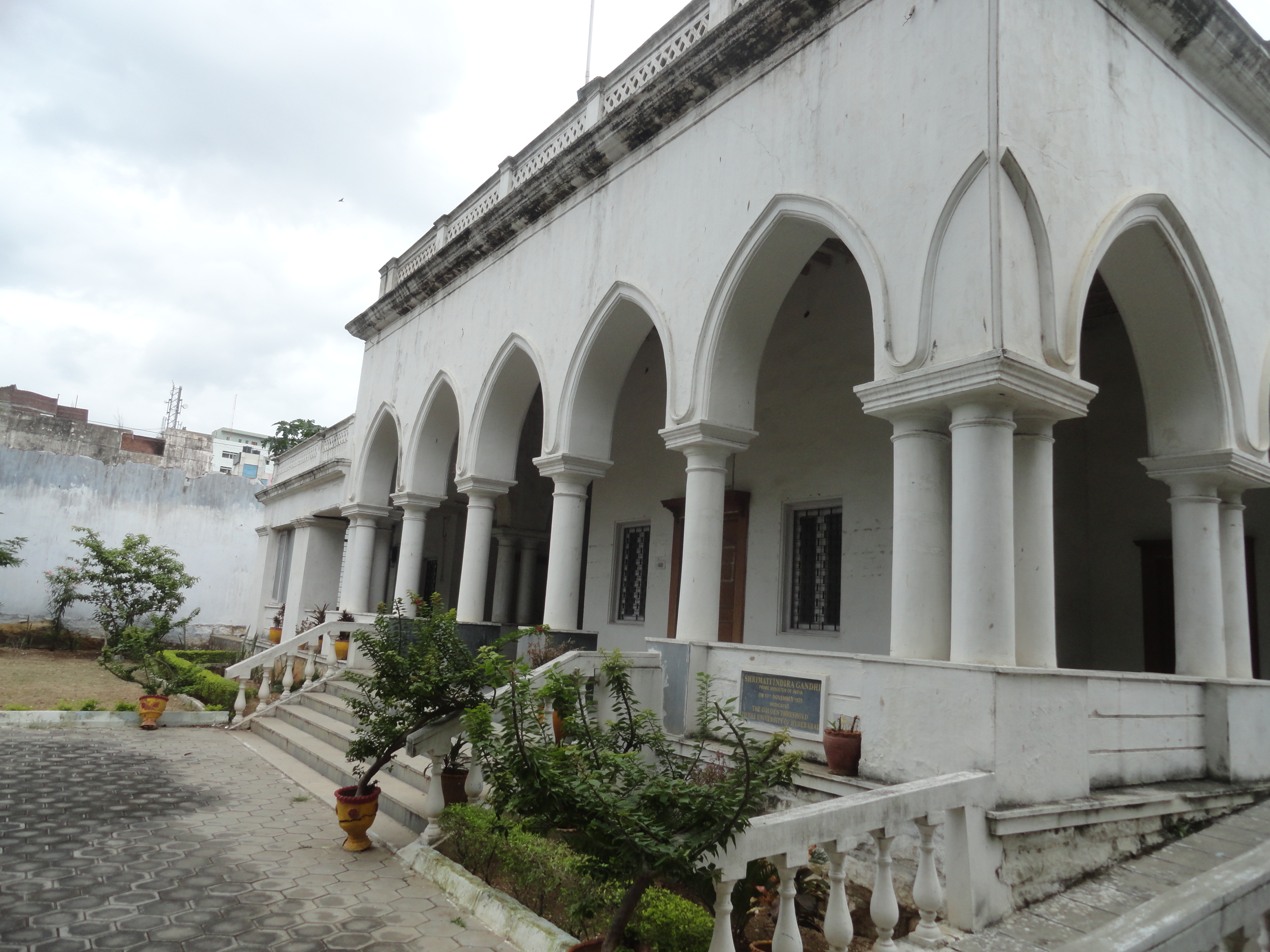
- View of the Golden Threshold in 2013
- Interactive map of the Golden Threshold area

General information
- Architectural style: Indo-European
- Location: Nampally Station Road, Abids, Hyderabad, India
- Coordinates: 17°23′17.82″N 78°28′26.95″E
- Owner: University of Hyderabad

The Golden Threshold is an off-campus annexe of University of Hyderabad. It is named after the renowned Indian poet and political leader Sarojini Naidu's eponymous first collection of poems. It is located near Nampally Station Road, in the Abids neighbourhood of Hyderabad.

The building was the residence of Sarojini Naidu's father Aghorenath Chattopadhyay, the first Principal of Hyderabad College, now Nizam College. During the Chattopadhyay family's residence, it was the centre of many reformist ideas in Hyderabad, in areas ranging from marriage, education, women's empowerment, literature and nationalism. Specifically, the reformist ideas included more power for women in a time where politics in India, especially regional politics, was dominated by men. It also included ideas for involvement of women in the arts field. There were also many restrictions on marriage during this time period that persist to this day, such as inter-religion and inter-caste marriages. These ideas were progressive for the era, but brought a change in urban India over time.

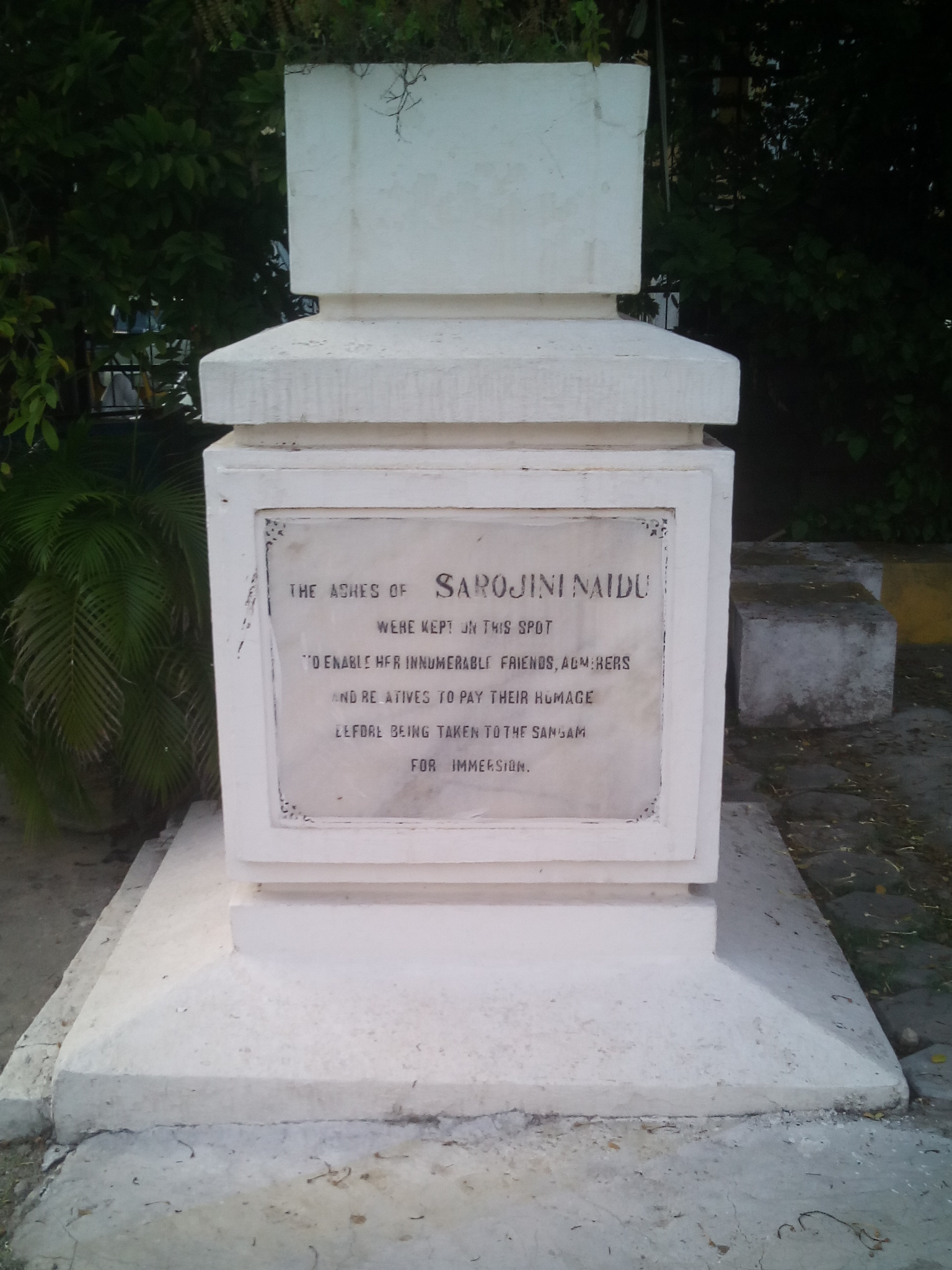
The ashes of Sarojini Naidu kept at Golden Threshold, Hyderabad before immersion

Golden Threshold was named after Sarojini Naidu's very first collection of poetry published in 1905. It now houses Sarojini Naidu School of Arts & Communication of University of Hyderabad. The University of Hyderabad has plans to restore the dilapidated structure and transform Golden Threshold into a museum-cum-cultural centre.

== History ==
=== University of Hyderabad (1975-present) ===
In 1974, Padmaja Naidu had donated it to the government to be used for educational purposes. In 1975, Prime Minister Indira Gandhi dedicated the Golden Threshold to its current owner, the University of Hyderabad.

The social sciences and humanities programmes were run at the Golden Threshold. These were moved to the main campus in 1988. The Sarojini Naidu School of Arts and Communication ran at the premises till 2003.

Till recently Golden Threshold was listed as a protected heritage building under the Regulation 13 of the HMDA Act. As the Telangana Heritage Law does not incorporate the HMDA regulation, the Golden Threshold was stripped of its ‘protected’ tag. The building today is in a dilapidated condition.
