= The Bird of Time (poetry) =

The Bird of Time is a poetry collection book by Indian poet Sarojini Naidu in 1912. The book consists of four chapters, which contain 47 poems in total. It is Naidu's second book and most strongly nationalist book of poems, published from both London and New York City. Inspired by Edmund Gosse work Naidu's work is steeped in the Romantic tradition while entirely conscious of the political and social strife of India.

In 2022, a plaque containing the poem "The Hussain Saagar", from the collection, was erected at Tank Bund Road. "In the Bazaars of Hyderabad" is another poem from The Bird of Time.

== Contents ==
Songs of Love and Death

- The Bird of Time
- Dirge: In sorrow of her bereavement
- An Indian Love Song
- In Remembrance: Violet Clarke
- Love and Death
- The Dance of Love
- A Love Song from the North
- At Twilight: On the way to Golconda
- Alone
- A Rajput Love Song
- A Persian Love Song
- To Love

Songs of the Spring time

- Spring
- A Song in Spring
- The Joy of the Springtime
- Vasant Panchami: Lilavati's Lament at the Feast of Spring
- In a Time of Flowers
- In Praise of Gulmohur Blossoms
- Nasturtiums
- Golden Cassia
- Champak Blossoms
- Ecstasy

Indian Folk-Songs (To Indian Tunes)

- Village Song
- Slumber Song for Sunalini
Songs of my City:

- In a Latticed Balcony
- In the Bazaars of Hyderabad

- Bangle-sellers
- The Festival of Serpents
- Song of Radha the Milkmaid
- Spinning Song
- Hymn to Indra, Lord of Rain

Songs of Life

- Death and Life
- The Hussain Saagar
- The Faery Isle of Janjira
- The Soul's Prayer
- Transience
- The Old Woman
- In the Night
- At Dawn
- An Anthem of Love
- Solitude
- A Challenge to Fate
- The Call to Evening Prayer
- In Salutation to the Eternal Peace
- Medley: A Kashmeri Song
- Farewell
- Guerdon

== See also ==
- Indian English literature
