= The Village Song =

Poem written by Sarojini Naidu

- by Sarojini Naidu
- Country: India
- Language: English and Hindustani
- Publication date: 1912

"The Village Song" is a poem by Sarojini Naidu about the mindset of two generations, represented by an old woman and her daughter.
