= In the Bazaars of Hyderabad =

1912 poem by Sarojini Naidu

In The Bazaars of Hyderabad
- by Sarojini Naidu
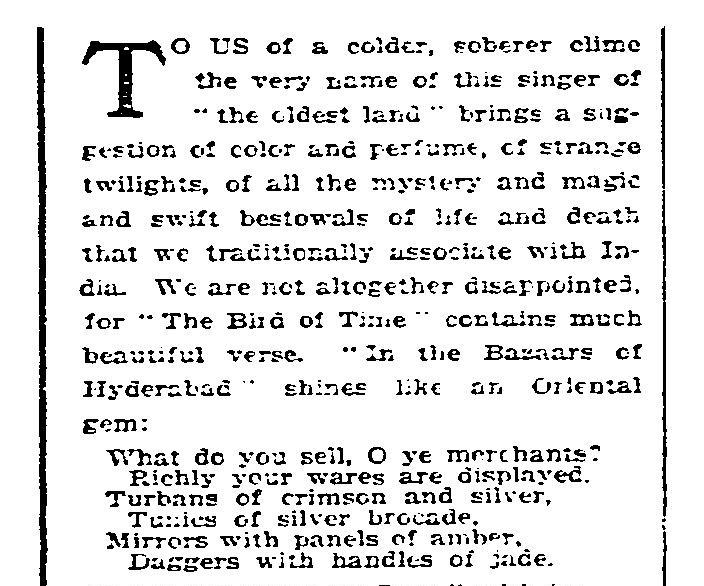
- The first paragraph of the poem was published in The New York Times on 27 April 1913. The reviewer credited the poem as an "Oriental gem".
- Country: India
- Language: English
- Subject(s): Romanticism; Lyric poetry
- Genre: Rhetorical
- Meter: Trochee
- Rhyme scheme: ABCBCB
- Publisher: Heinemann, London; John Lane, New York
- Publication date: c. 1912
- Media type: Book
- Lines: 30

"In The Bazaars of Hyderabad" is a poem by Indian Romanticism and Lyric poet Sarojini Naidu (1879–1949). The work was composed and published in her anthology The Bird of Time (1912)—which included "Bangle-sellers" and "The Bird of Time", it is Naidu's second publication and most strongly nationalist book of poems, published from both London and New York City. While studying in England from 1895 to 1898 Naidu ameliorate her poetic expertise under the guidance of her teachers Sir Edmund William Gosse and Arthur Symons. Post Swadeshi Movement (1905) her work began to focus on Indian life and culture. Although actively involved in the Indian independence movement which left her little time to devote to poetry, she composed "In The Bazaars of Hyderabad" from her childhood reminiscence.

The poem is written in five stanzas, Naidu uses imagery and alliteration, with traditional end rhymes, as well as the poem manifests distinct characteristic of Hyderabad's social etiquette, mannerism, lifestyle of aristocracy and the society. In the poem, the Bazaars are just not only meant for buying and selling, but it is also a focal-point for people from different backgrounds having multifarious interests. In this poem, Naidu describes the beauty of traditional Hyderabadi bazaars. She presented the lively picturesque scenes of merchants, vendors, peddlers, goldsmiths, fruit men, and flower girls selling their goods, all of whom answer the questions of purchasers who buy their articles after meticulous chaffering. The poem also describes the musical instruments being used by the musicians and magicians in the bazaar.

The poem is included in academics of Indian education boards and some universities in Europe taught the poem in the English literature syllabus.

== Background ==
The culture of Hyderabad is distinct, with a mix of traditional and modern influences. The goods sold by the Bazaar vendors cater to the needs of every segment of society. Sarojini Naidu generally provides a panoramic and picturesque view of a Bazaar's colors, sounds, and sights in Hyderabad. She has also used vibrant rhymes to describe the magnificence of the bazaars and the products sold in the bazaars.

According to the scholar Natesan Sharda Iyer who authored "Musings on Indian Writing in English: Poetry"—(2005); in this poem "Sarojini Naidu had transformed Hyderabad into a romantic land of Walter de la Mare's Tartary and Arabia.

Agonized by the partition of Bengal in 1905 and influenced by the call of Gopal Krishna Gokhale's socio-political reforms, Naidu joined the Indian independence movement where she was introduced to Mahatma Gandhi, Rabindranath Tagore, Pandit Jawaharlal Nehru, C.P. Ramaswami Iyer and Muhammad Ali Jinnah. Naidu shifted her focus by writing with a vision of national integration and to promote the Swadeshi Movement.

== Poem ==
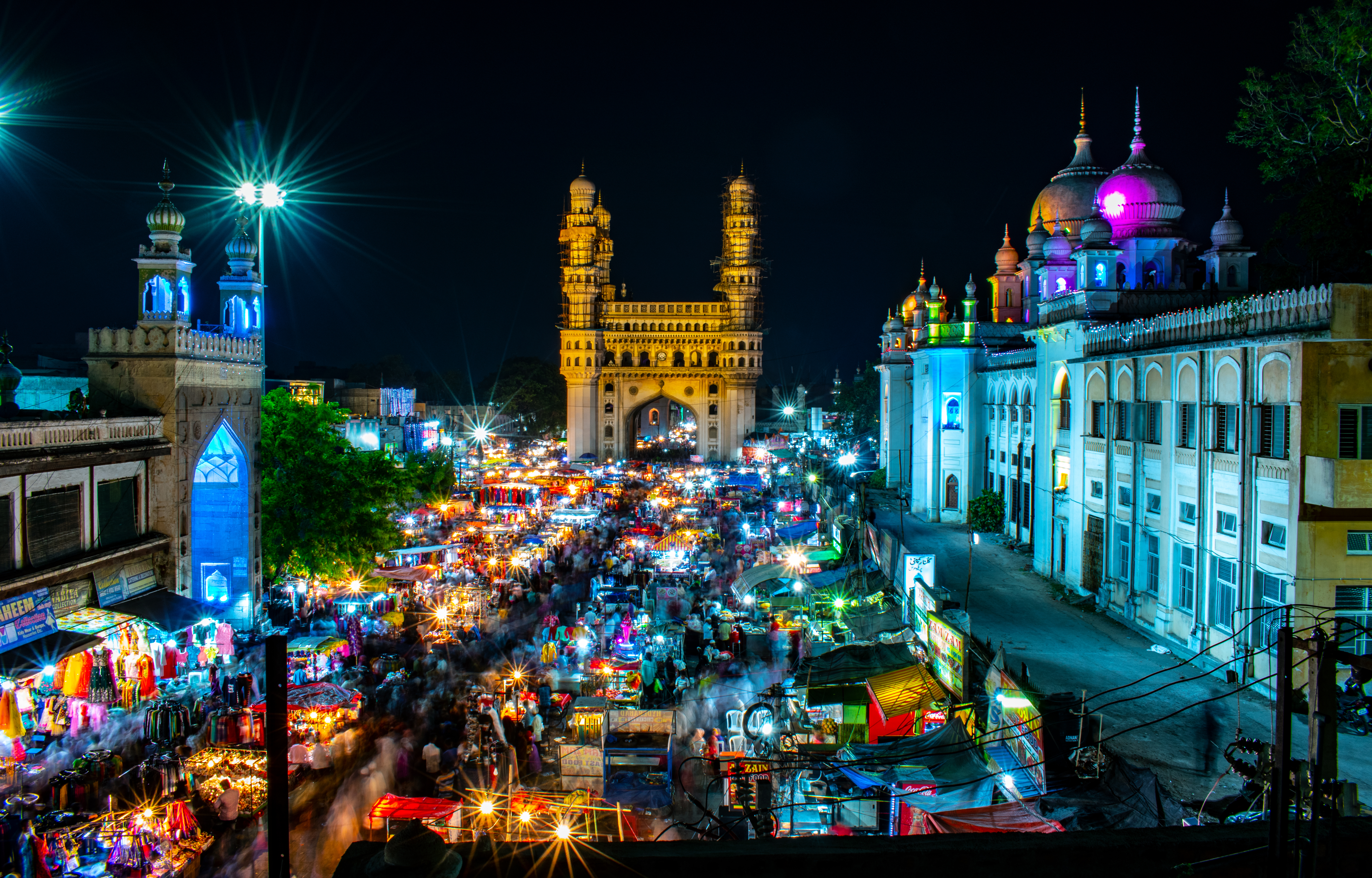
A view of Bazaar, near Charminar.

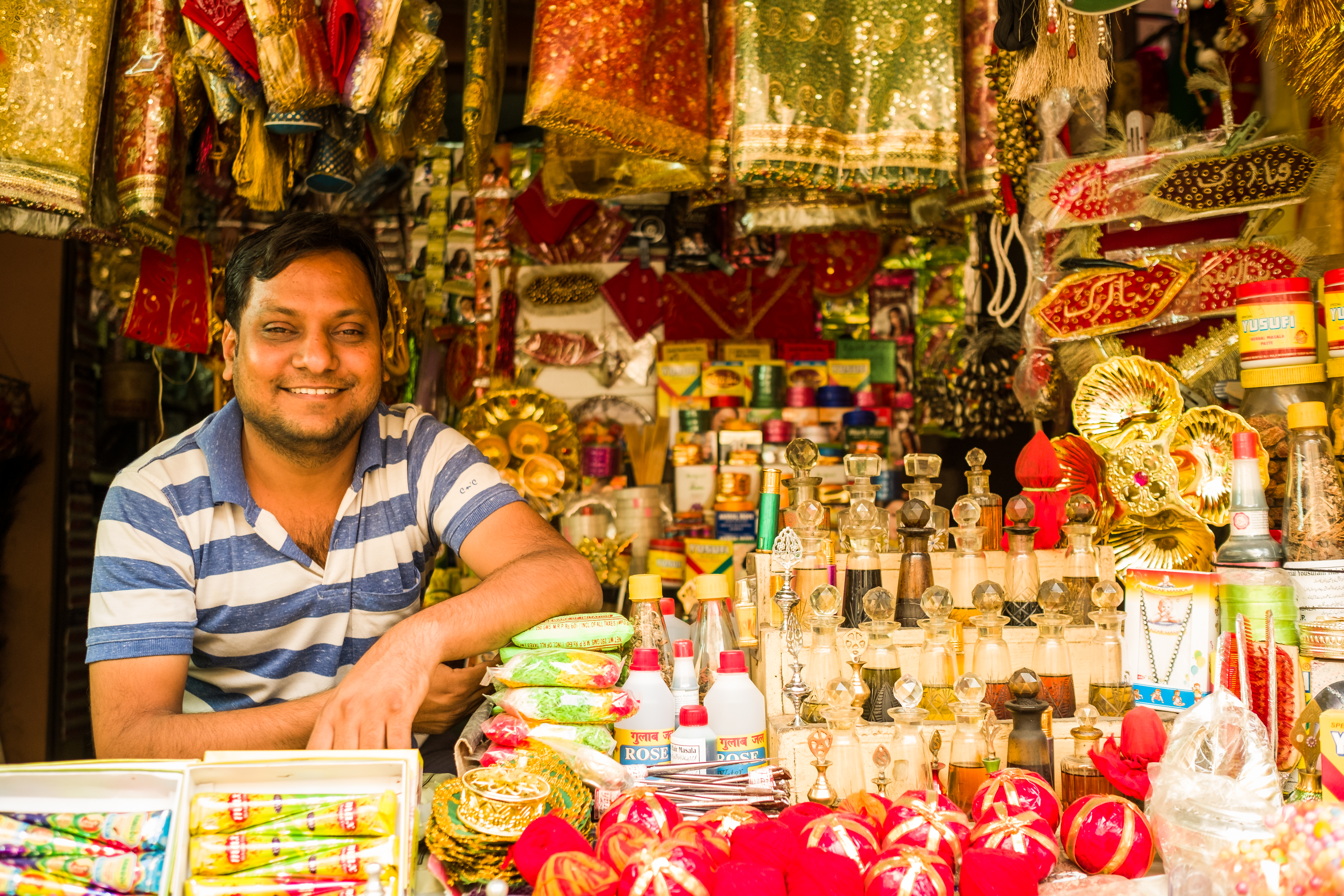
A perfume—attar seller at perals market.

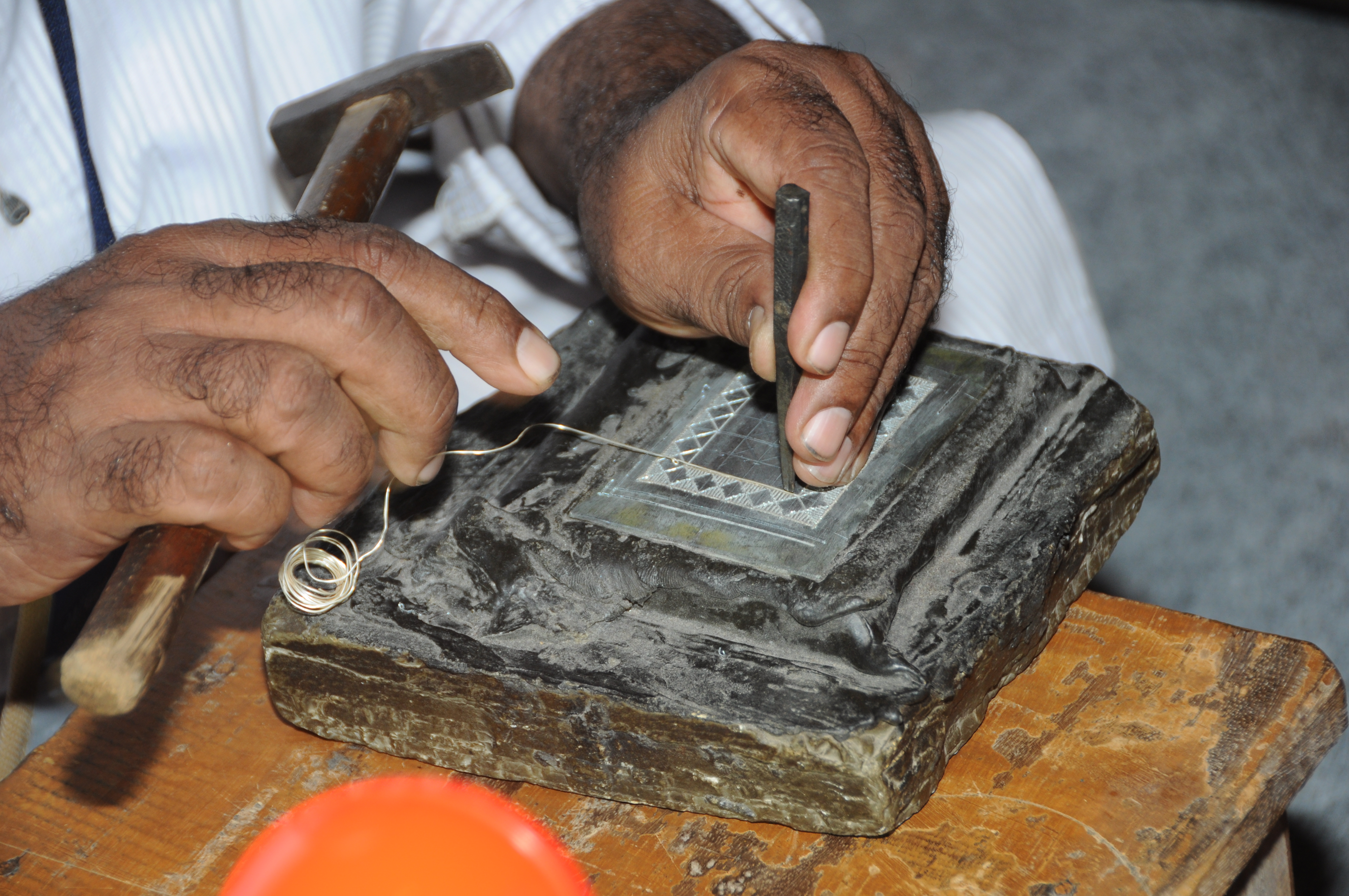
A goldsmith at Laad Bazaar.

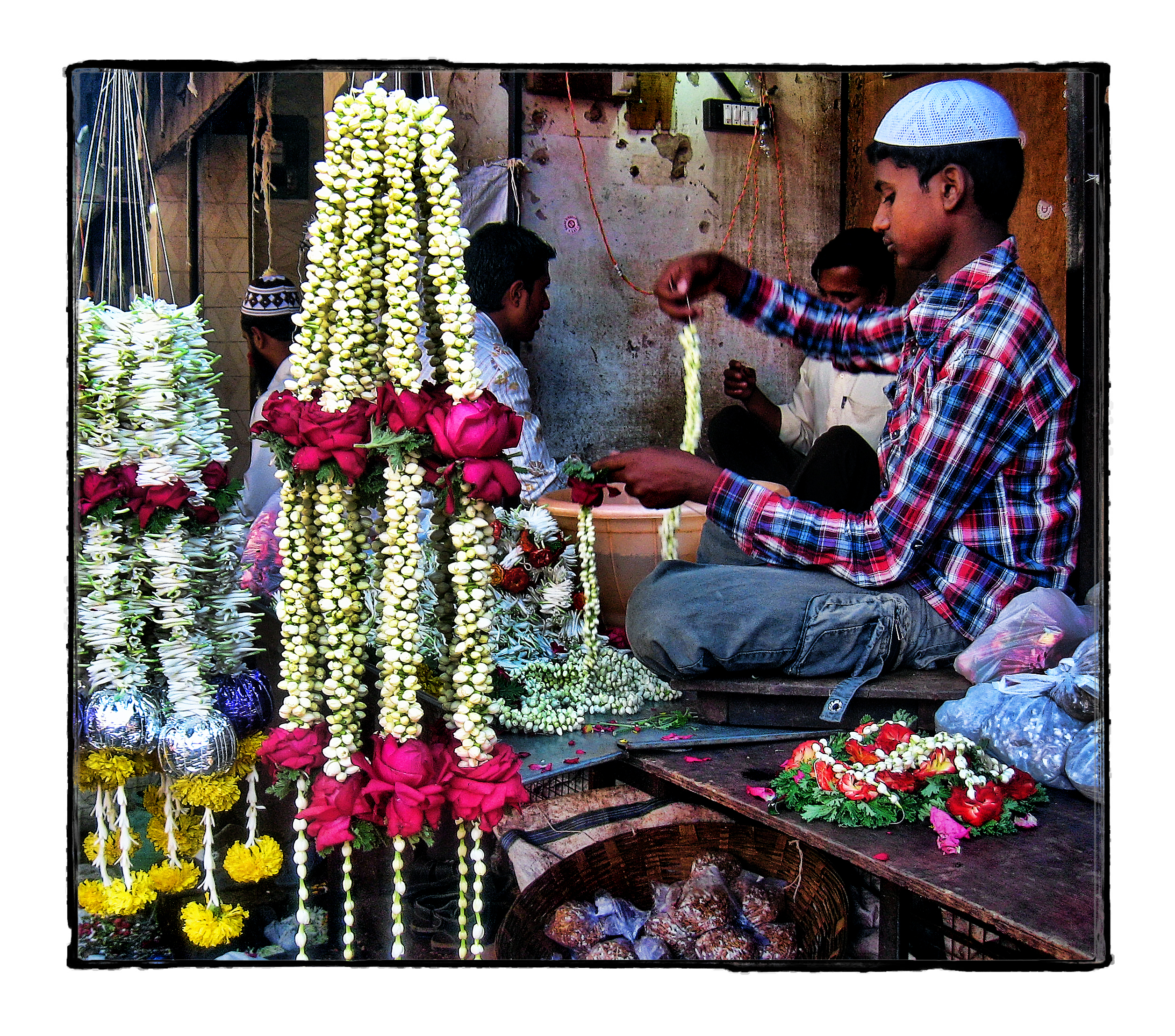
A Flower vendor at Moazzam Jahi Bazaar.

In The Bazaars of Hyderabad

What do you sell, O ye merchants?
Richly your wares are displayed.
Turbans of crimson and silver,
Tunics of purple brocade,
Mirrors with panels of amber,
Daggers with handles of jade.

What do you weigh, O ye vendors?
Saffron, lentil, and rice.
What do you grind, O ye maidens?
Sandalwood, henna, and spice.
What do you call, O ye pedlars?
Chessmen and ivory dice.

What do you make, O ye goldsmiths?
Wristlet and anklet and ring,
Bells for the feet of blue pigeons,
Frail as a dragon - fly's wing,
Girdles of gold for the dancers,
Scabbards of gold for the kings.

What do you cry, O ye Fruit merchants?
Citron, pomegranate and plum.
What do you play, O ye musicians?
Sitar, Sarangi and drum.
What do you chant, O ye magicians?
Spells for the aeons to come.

What do you weave, O ye flower-girls?
With tassels of azure and red?
Crowns for the brow of a bridegroom,
Chaplets to garland his bed,
Sheets of white blossoms new-garnered
To perfume the sleep of the dead.

--Sarojini Naidu--

== Structure ==
=== Style ===
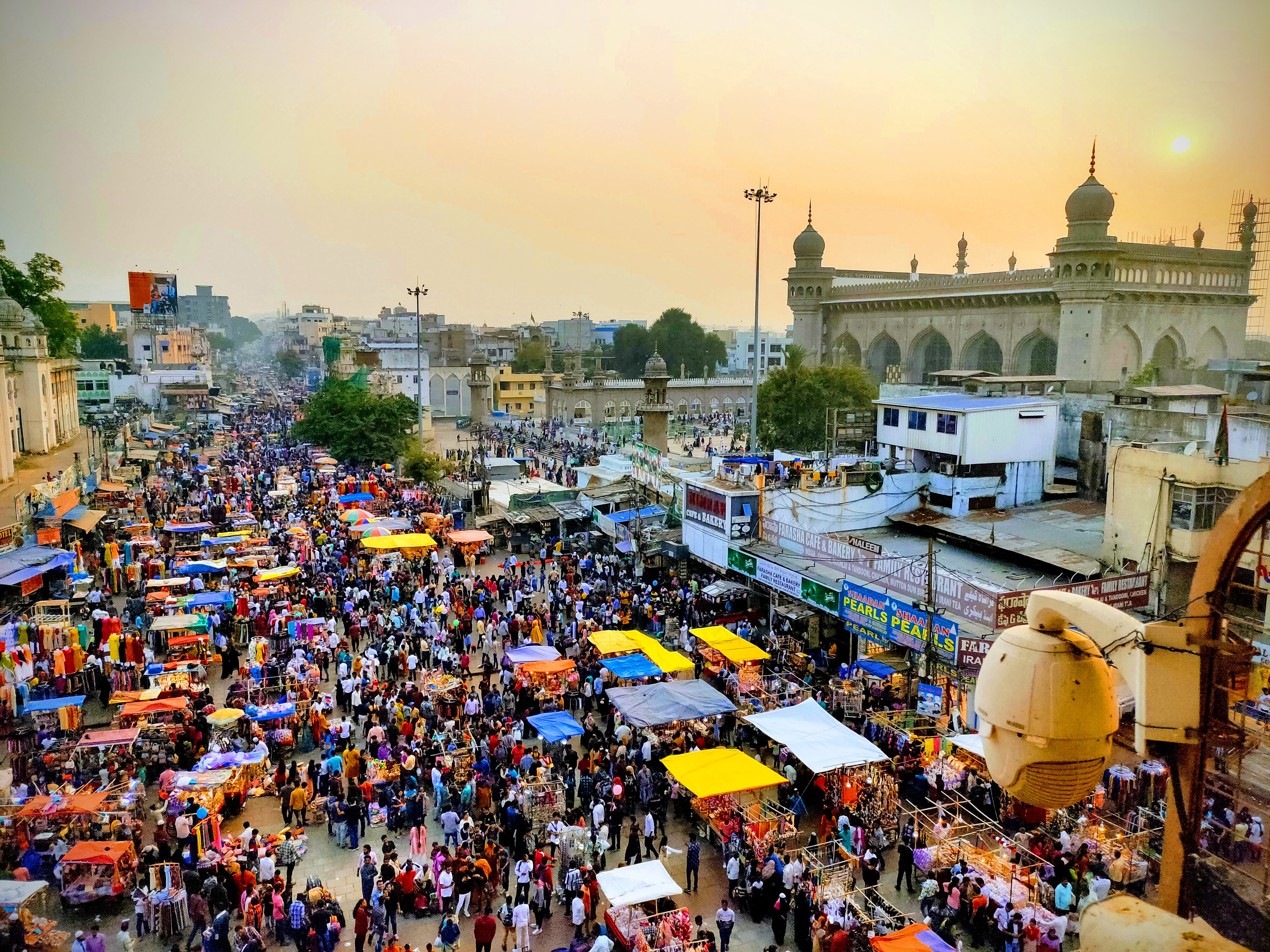
A scene of Bazaar outside of Makkah Masjid, Hyderabad.

In the poem "In the Bazaars of Hyderabad" the poet describes the usual occupations as seen in the bazaars; The poem is set in the form of conversation between the buyers and the vendors. Every stanza of poem contains a question about day-to-day merchandise available in the bazaar. Naidu presents the scenes of local musicians performing there compositions played with traditional instruments and the magicians creating an atmosphere of ecstasy, the various fruits being sold by the fruit-men, the weighing of saffron, lentils, and rice by the vendors, and other depictions of various commodities which are sold in the bazaar. Naidu had used vibrant rhymes to describes the merchandising and nobility of the bazaar.

=== Poetic devices ===
The poem contains five stanzas of six lines each. Every line of the poem contains a rhythm and a beat, and the sequence of the phrases "What do you" and "O ye" marks the rhyme scheme of the poem. It follows a unique rhyme scheme in which the second, fourth, and sixth lines in each stanza rhyme. The third and fifth lines also rhyme. Whereas the last stanza is a slight exception though. The poet often repeats these phrases, to create a musical effect, to emphasize a point, and lend unity to the poem. The conversation between the vendor and the buyer is set in a form of question and answer. To present the pictorial scene of the bazaar, Naidu uses poetic-imagery—(a vibrant sense of touch, sound, smell, sight, and taste), as well as alliteration and traditional end rhyme. The general scheme is ABCBCB.

=== Summary ===
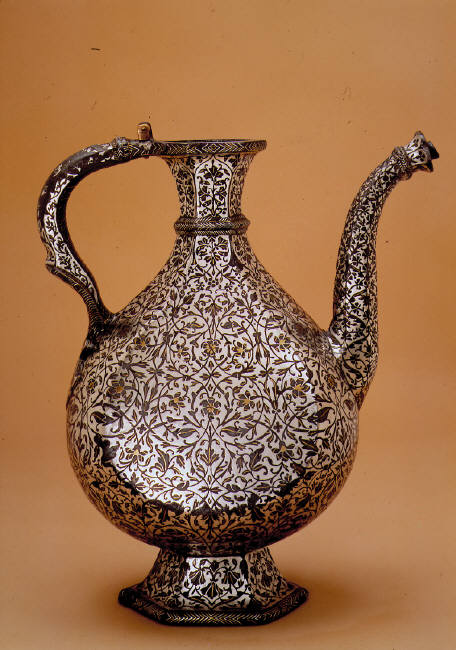
A Bidriware of the 18th century, displayed at Victoria and Albert Museum

The first stanza in the poem begins with the poet questioning the merchants in the bazaar about what they are selling, to which the merchants answered that they are selling crimson, silver-colored turbans, mirrors with panels of amber, and daggers with handles made of jade.

In the second stanza, the poet moves to another stall and asked the same question to the vendor about what they are weighing to sell. Saffron, lentils, and rice replied to the vendors. The poet asks the same question to maidens about what they are grinding and she gets a reply that they are grinding henna, sandalwood, and spices. At the end of the stanza, the poet questions the peddlers about what they are selling and they reply with dice and chessmen made from ivory.

The poet moves to a jewelry shop in the third stanza and asks the goldsmith what ornaments they manufacture. They reply; with necklaces, bracelets, anklets, and rings, and continued to say that, they also make bells for blue pigeons that are tied to their feet. The bells are as delicate as a dragonfly's wing. Simultaneously they make gold girdles for dancers and scabbards for the kings to keep their swords.

In the fourth stanza, the poet visits a fruit shop. There she inquires about what they are selling. They reply that they sell lemon, pomegranate, and plum. Then the musicians were asked what they play and they say sitar, sarangi, and drums. The poet even comes across magicians and asks them what they are chanting and they say that they are chanting magical spells to charm a thousand ages to come.

The final stanza is about the flower girls who are asked what they are weaving with strands of colorful flowers. The flower girls answer that they are making garlands for the bride and groom to be decorated during the wedding night. Alternately they also weave sheets of white flowers that are placed on graves for fragrance purposes. It is a beautiful last line as it ends (although not ominous) on the note of death, rather like life itself.

== Themes ==
Folklore is one of the central subjects in the poetry of Naidu. In The Bazaars of Hyderabad is associated with one such subject, the charm and enthusiasm of a traditional bazaar in the city of Hyderabad is introduced in this poem. Naidu had described the Bazaar with merchants and vendors selling a diverse range of merchandise. The poet stops over at the galleries arranged by the merchants, traders, hawkers, goldsmiths, fruit sellers, peddlers, magicians, musicians, and flower girls. The poet describes the formal experience of conversation between the seller and the buyer, here the poet questions the vendors about there merchandise and who in turn politely enunciate their goods. Emotional moods are stirred by the poet when Naidu makes the readers feel that the bazaar life also witnesses both sorrows and joys. Wedding and festival occasions bring joy in the Bazaar's life when people buy jewelry, garlands, fruits, and children crowd near the magicians. The sorrow and sadness are witnessed when common public kitchens are arranged when the nobles or soldiers die and when flower girls are seen weaving masses of white flowers to adorn the graves of the dead people, to which Naidu said, "perfume the sleep of the dead".

Another theme in the poem is the Swadeshi movement, reminding fellow Indians about the rich Indian traditions. Thus, Naidu tries to evoke the curiosity of Indians by presenting the scenes of a bazaar where traditional Indian products are merchandised for all forms of livelihood, affliction, and revelry.

== Popular culture ==
The poem has been included in the syllabuses of Indian Secondary schools, the Indian Civil Services Examination and in some of the universities of Europe. Some schools in India organise a skit base play based on the poem to make their people understand the shopping experience in the bazaars, including the Hyderabadi biryani, the traditional ingredients used in the Hyderabadi cuisines, and the jewellery and clothing. Based on the poem, a play titled "Love's Labour" was conducted in Madurai by the students of Sri Meenakshi college for women. The play was different from regular stage plays as it contained model sets of bazaars similar to Hyderabad. The play was organised to promote the literary work of women.

== Critical reception ==
Critical and scholarly praise has been unanimous in declaring "In the Bazaars of Hyderabad" one of the perfect poems of the English language in India, becoming one of Naidu's most popular poems that had brought her international acclamation.

The New York Times reviewed the poem in the edition of 27 April 1913 and wrote, "To us of a colder, soberer clime the very name of this singer of "the oldest land" brings a suggestion of color and perfume, of strange twilight's, of all the mystery and magic and swift bestowals of life and death that we traditionally associate with India. We are not altogether happy as well as sad, for "The time to rue and the time of sewing" contains many beautiful verses. "In the Bazaars of Hyderabad" shines like an oriental gem".

== See also ==
- Indian Poetry
- Indian English literature
