= National Cooperative Union of India =

Rural development organisation in India

- Abbreviation: NCUI
- Formation: 1929
- Founder: Lallubhai Samaldas
- Founded at: Chennai
- Formerly called: All India Cooperative Institutes Association (1929); Indian Cooperative Union (1951)

The National Cooperative Union of India (NCUI), is an umbrella organisation representing the cooperative movement in India. It was established in 1929 at Madras, now Chennai, as the All India Cooperative Institutes Association and its first president was Lallubhai Samaldas. In 1951 it was reorganised as the Indian Cooperative Union (ICU) by the merger of the Indian Provincial Cooperative Banks' Association with the All India Cooperative Institutes Association. In 1961 it was renamed the NCUI. (Note: Jasleen Dhamija describes an organisation called the Indian Cooperative Union formed in Delhi in 1949 by Kamaladevi Chattopadhyay.)
