= Special Marriage Act, 1872 =

The Special Marriage Act, 1872 is a law currently in force in Bangladesh that allows interfaith marriages between the country's citizens and foreign nationals residing in Bangladesh. The Act enables any Muslim, Hindu, Buddhist, Jew, Jain, Parsi, Christian, Sikh or atheist individual to marry someone of any of the aforementioned faiths or belief systems. The religious affiliation of the parties does not need to be the same.

The Act is primarily used for marriages between persons of different religions or for those who are irreligious or have renounced their religion. It was originally enacted in British India and remained in force until the Special Marriage Act, 1954 was introduced in India. The 1872 Act continues to be in force in present-day Bangladesh and Pakistan.

Under the Act, both polygamy and conversion of religion for the purpose of marriage are considered offenses. Marriage registration under this Act is not permitted if the parties are closely related by blood, such as having a common ancestor (e.g., great-grandfather) or closer.

Divorce under this law is governed by the Divorce Act, 1869, and inheritance is governed by the Succession Act, 1925.

Notably, any adherent of the Hindu, Buddhist, Sikh, or Jain faith who marries under this Act is deemed to have severed ties with their undivided family. However, they do not lose inheritance rights. If the individual is not the sole surviving child of their father, they may lose the right to adopt another person.

One or more Marriage Registrars appointed by the Government of Bangladesh are authorized to register marriages under this Act. However, in practice, such registrations are conducted only at the office in Patuatuli, Old Dhaka.
