= Jasleen Dhamija =

Indian art historian (1933–2023)

Jasleen Dhamija (1933 – 4 March 2023) was an Indian textile art historian, crafts expert and United Nations worker. Based in Delhi, she was best known for her pioneering research on the handloom and handicraft industry, especially history of textiles and costumes. She was professor of living cultural traditions at the University of Minnesota. Over the years, during her career as a textile revivalist and scholar, she authored several books on textiles, including Sacred Textiles of India (2014).

== Background ==
Dhamija was born in 1933, and grew up in Abbottabad, in the North Western Frontier Province, before her family migrated to Delhi in 1940, where they lived in Khyber Pass locality of Civil Lines, Delhi. She graduated from Miranda House, University of Delhi.

Dhamija died on 4 March 2023.

== Career ==
Dhamija started her career in 1954, with culture and craft revivalist Kamaladevi Chattopadhyay in the Government of India, and started working on craft revival, community development and women's employment. In the 1960s, she worked with the Handicrafts Board of India, next she started working with artisans directly in rural area, this in time lead to her work with the UN developing self-help programmes for women in war-torn Balkan countries.

Over the years, she curated several textile and crafts exhibitions. Besides several books, on crafts and textile, she also wrote two cookbooks, including Joy of Vegetarian Cooking (2000). In 2007, she published a biography of Kamaladevi Chattopadhyay and her role in the revival of the arts and crafts in modern India.

She was part of the faculty at the National Institute of Fashion Technology, New Delhi, where she taught History of Indian Textiles and costumes.

== Works ==
- P.N. Mago; Jasleen Dhamija (1970). Himachal Heritage. Tata Press.
- Jasleen Dhamija (1976). Role of Institutional Support on the Rural Non-farm Sector. Employment and Rural Development Division, World Bank.
- Jasleen Dhamija (1979). Living Tradition of Iran's Crafts. Vikas. ISBN 978-0-7069-0728-5.
- Jasleen Dhamija; Carnegie Corporation of New York; Ford Foundation (1981). Women and handicrafts: myth and reality. SEEDS.
- Jasleen Dhamija (1983). Income-generating Activities for Rural Women in Developing Countries : an Overview. International Labour Office.
- Jasleen Dhamija (1985). Crafts of Gujarat. Mapin. ISBN 9780295962481.
- Jasleen Dhamija; Jyotindra Jain (1989). Handwoven fabrics of India. Mapin Pub. ISBN 9780944142264.
- Jasleen Dhamija (1994). Indian Folk Arts and Crafts. National Book Trust.
- Jasleen Dhamija (1995). The Woven Silks of India. Marg Publications. ISBN 978-81-85026-28-2.
- Jasleen Dhamija (2000). The Joy of Vegetarian Cooking. Penguin Books. ISBN 978-0-14-028749-3.
- Jasleen Dhamija (2002). Woven magic: the affinity between Indian and Indonesian textiles. Dian Rakyat. ISBN 9789795235675.
- Jasleen Dhamija (2003). Cooking for All Seasons. Penguin Books India. ISBN 978-0-14-302809-3.
- Jasleen Dhamija (2003). Handicrafts of India: Our Cultural Tradition. National Book Trust, India. ISBN 978-81-237-3974-8.
- Jasleen Dhamija (2004). Asian embroidery. Abhinav Publications. ISBN 81-7017-450-3.
- Jasleen Dhamija (2007). Kamaladevi Chattopadhyay. National Book Trust. ISBN 978-81-237-4882-5.
- Joanne B. Eicher; Jasleen Dhamija (2010). Berg Encyclopedia of World Dress and Fashion: South Asia and Southeast Asia. Berg. ISBN 978-1-84788-393-3.
- Jasleen Dhamija (2014). Sacred Textiles of India. Marg Publications. ISBN 978-93-83243-01-3.
