= Suhasini Chattopadhyay =

Indian politician

- Born: 1902
- Died: 26 November 1973 (aged 70–71)
- Political party: Communist Party of India
- Spouse: A. C. N. Nambiar (m. 1920, divorced)

Suhasini Chattopadhyay (also known as Suhasini Nambiar; 1902 – 26 November 1973) was an Indian communist leader.

== Biography ==
Chattopadhyay was one of eight children of Aghore Nath Chattopadhyay and Barada Sundari Debi. She was the sister of Indian National Congress President Sarojini Naidu.

In 1920 she married journalist A. C. N. Nambiar in Madras when she was 17. They separated soon due to Nambiar's affair with his secretary, Eva Geissler. After she finished her studies at Oxford both of them moved to Berlin.

Influenced by her brother Virendranath Chattopadhyay she became a communist. She then attended Eastern University in Moscow. She returned to India with the British communist Lester Hutchinson in 1928.

In 1938 she married R.M. Jambhekar, a trade union activist and founder of ISCUS. They had met in Moscow. After American journalist Edgar Snow came to India in 1931 he wrote in his article, "The Revolt of India's Women", that she was the most beautiful woman he had ever seen.

She joined the Communist Party of India in 1929 as its first woman member.

She died in 1973 in Bombay.
