= Sarojini Naidu =

Indian political activist and poet (1879–1949)

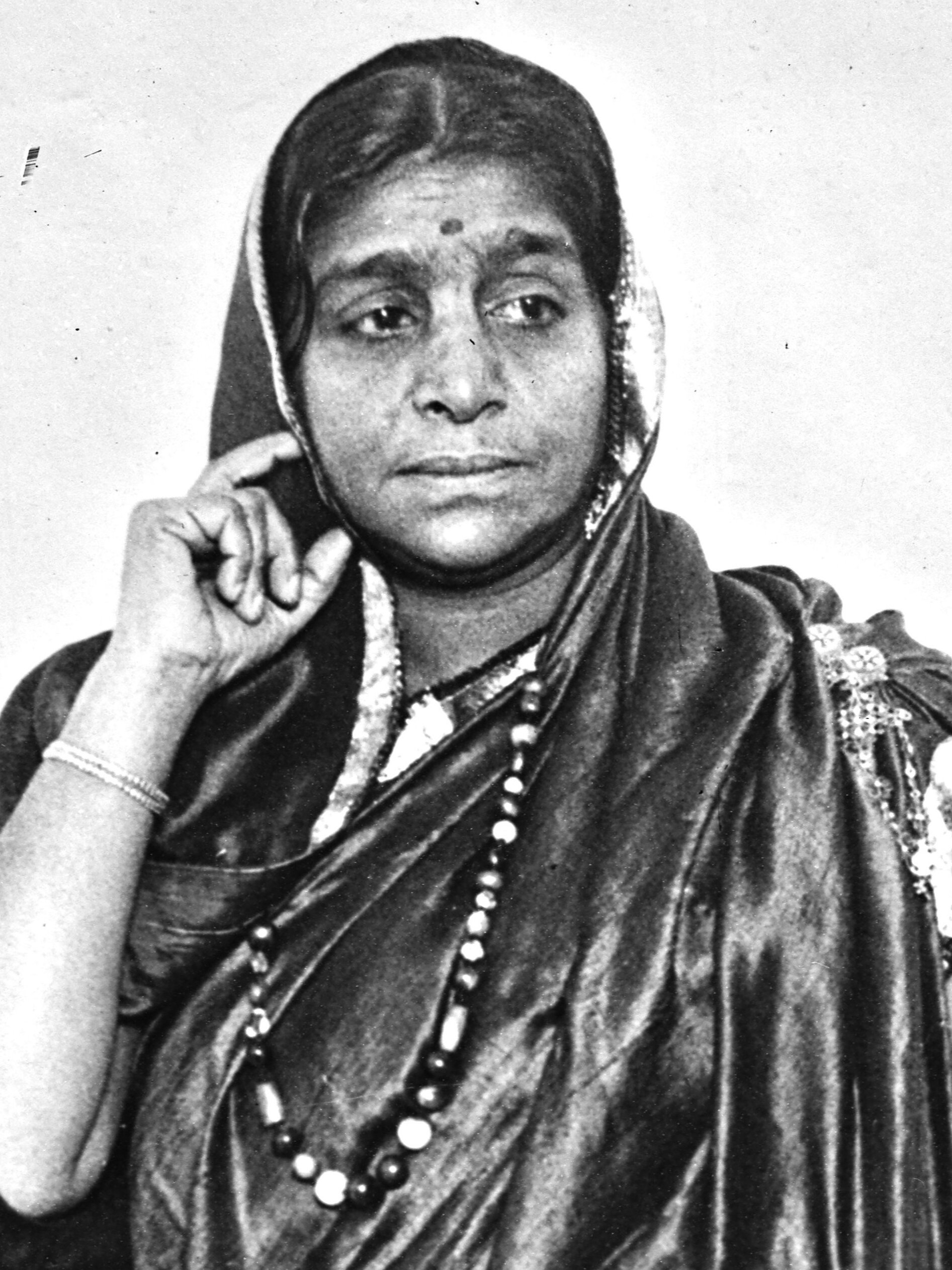
- Naidu in 1928

1st Governor of the United Provinces
- In office 15 August 1947 – 2 March 1949
- Preceded by: Position established
- Succeeded by: Hormasji Peroshaw Mody

44th President of the Indian National Congress
- In office 1925–1926
- Preceded by: Mahatma Gandhi
- Succeeded by: S. Srinivasa Iyengar

Personal details
- Born: Sarojini Chattopadhyay; 13 February 1879 Hyderabad, Hyderabad State, British Raj (present-day Telangana, India)
- Died: 2 March 1949 (aged 70) Lucknow, United Provinces, India (present-day Uttar Pradesh, India)
- Party: Indian National Congress
- Spouse: Govindarajulu Naidu (m. 1898)
- Children: 5, including Padmaja
- Relatives: Virendranath (brother); Harindranath (brother); Suhasini (sister)
- Education: King's College, London; Girton College, Cambridge
- Occupation: Political activist, Poet
- Nicknames: "Nightingale of India"; "Bhārata Kōkiḷā"; "Bulbul-e-Hind"; "Prāchya Jagatara Kōkiḷā"
- Writing career
- Language: English
- Genre: Lyric poetry
- Subject: Indian nationalism
- Notable works: The Golden Threshold; "In the Bazaars of Hyderabad"

Signature
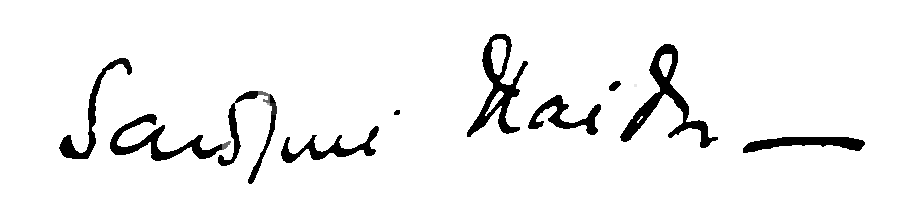

Sarojini Naidu (née Chattopadhyay; Bengali pronunciation: [ʃɔrod͡ʒini]; 13 February 1879 – 2 March 1949) was an Indian political activist and poet who served as the first Governor of United Provinces, after India's independence. She played an important role in the Indian independence movement against the British Raj. She was the first Indian woman to be president of the Indian National Congress and appointed governor of a state.

Born in a Bengali family in Hyderabad, Naidu was educated in Madras, London and Cambridge. Following her time in Britain, where she worked as a suffragist, she was drawn to the Congress party's struggle for India's independence. She became a part of the national movement and became a follower of Mahatma Gandhi and the idea of swaraj (self-rule). She was appointed Congress president in 1925 and, when India achieved its independence, became the Governor of the United Provinces in 1947.

Naidu's literary work as a poet earned her the nickname the "Nightingale of India" by Gandhi because of the colour, imagery, and lyrical quality of her poetry. Her oeuvre includes both children's poems and others written on more serious themes including patriotism and tragedy. Published in 1912, "In the Bazaars of Hyderabad" remains one of her most popular poems.

== Personal life ==
Sarojini Naidu was born in Hyderabad on 13 February 1879 to Aghorenath Chattopadhyay. Her father was from Brahmangaon, Bikrampur, Bengal (now in Munshiganj, Bangladesh). Her father was a Bengali Brahmin and the principal of Nizam College. He held a doctorate of Science from Edinburgh University. Her mother, Barada Sundari Devi, wrote poetry in Bengali.

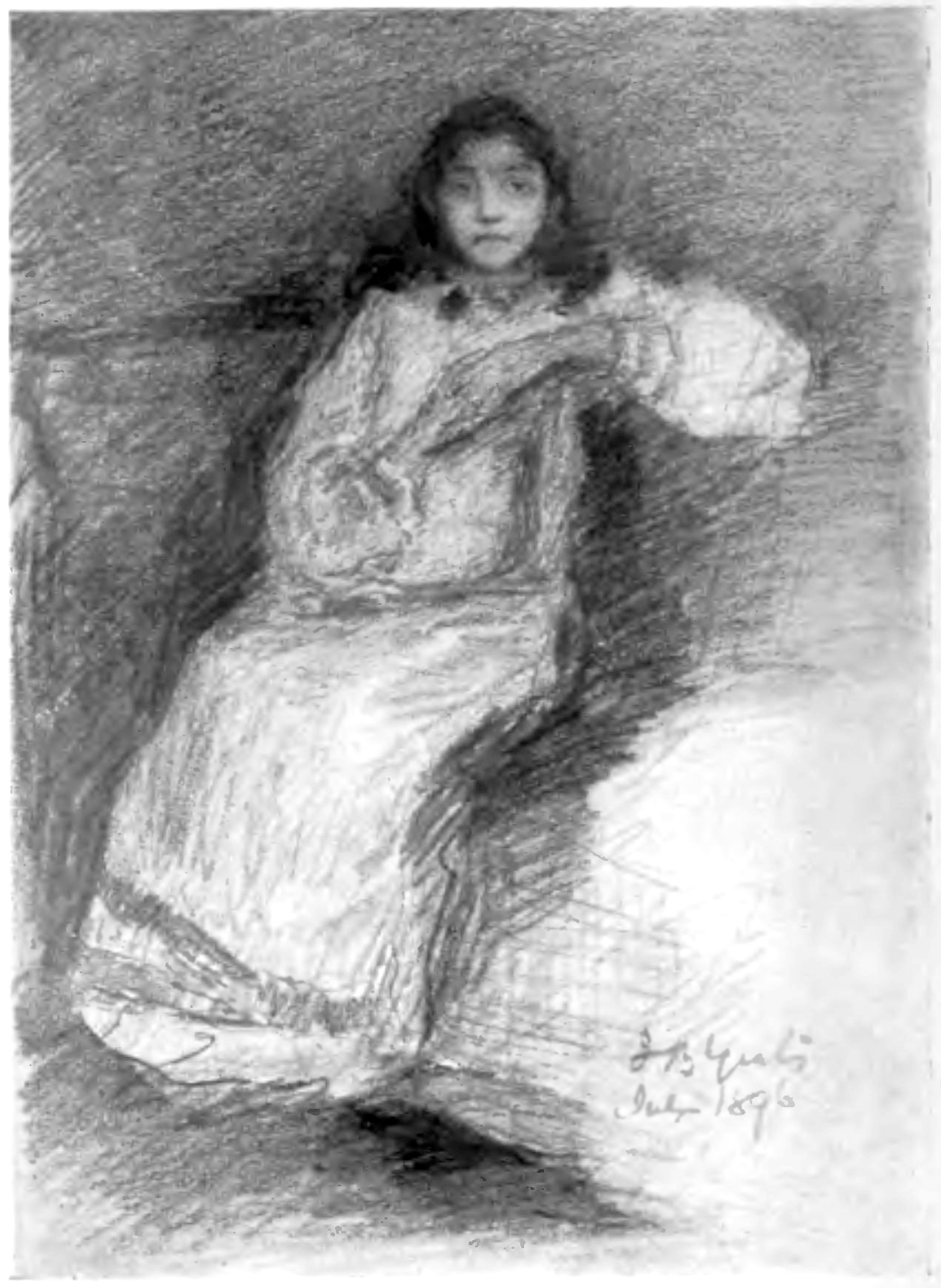
Drawing of Naidu by John Butler Yeats, 1896, from the frontispiece of The Golden Threshold (1905)

She was the eldest of the eight siblings. Her brother Virendranath Chattopadhyay was a revolutionary, and another brother Harindranath was a poet, a dramatist, and an actor. Her sisters, Sunalini and Mrinalini, were actresses in silent films. Another sister, Suhasini, was an Indian communist leader. Their family was well-regarded in Hyderabad.

=== Education ===
Sarojini Naidu passed her matriculation examination to qualify for university study, earning the highest rank, in 1891, when she was twelve. From 1895 to 1898 she studied in England, at King's College, London and then Girton College, Cambridge, with a scholarship from the Nizam of Hyderabad. In England, she met artists from the Aesthetic and Decadent movements.

=== Marriage ===
Chattopadhyay returned to Hyderabad in 1898. That same year, she married Govindaraju Naidu (who hailed from Machilipatnam, Andhra Pradesh), a doctor whom she met during her stay in England, in an inter-caste marriage which has been called "groundbreaking and scandalous". Both their families approved their marriage, which was long and harmonious. They had five children. Their daughter Padmaja also joined the Quit India Movement, and she held several governmental positions in independent India.

== Political career ==
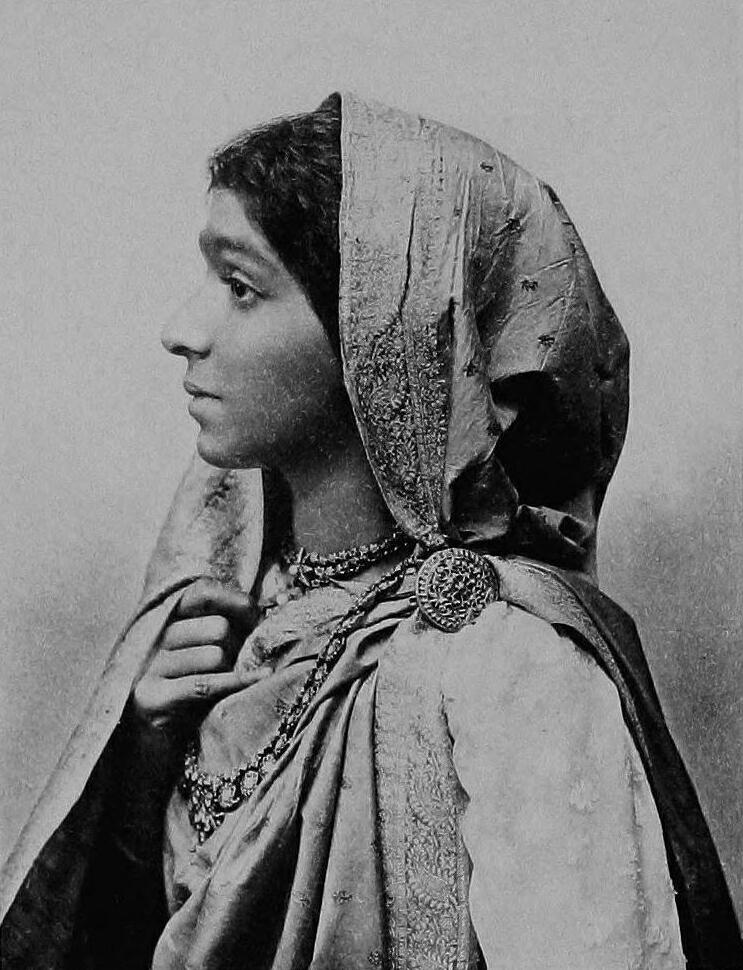
Naidu in 1912

=== Early oratory ===
Beginning in 1904, Naidu became an increasingly popular orator, promoting Indian independence and women's rights, especially women's education. Her oratory often framed arguments following the five-part rhetorical structures of Nyaya reasoning. She addressed the Indian National Congress and the Indian Social Conference in Calcutta in 1906. Her social work for flood relief earned her the Kaisar-i-Hind Medal in 1911, which she later returned in protest over the April 1919 Jallianwala Bagh massacre. She met Muthulakshmi Reddy in 1909, and in 1914 she met Mahatma Gandhi, whom she credited with inspiring a new commitment to political action. She was the first Indian woman President of the Indian National Congress and first Indian woman to preside over the INC conference.

With Reddy, she helped established the Women's Indian Association in 1917. Later that year, Naidu accompanied her colleague Annie Besant, who was the president of Home Rule League and Women's Indian Association, to advocate universal suffrage in front of the Joint Select Committee in London, United Kingdom.She also supported the Lucknow Pact, a joint Hindu–Muslim demand for British political reform, at the Madras Special Provincial Council. As a public speaker, Naidu's oratory was known for its personality and its incorporation of her poetry.

=== Women's movement ===
Naidu utilized her poetry and oratory skills to promote women's rights alongside the nationalist movement. In 1902, Naidu entered the world of politics after being urged by Gopal Krishna Gokhale, an important leader of the nationalist movement. In 1906, Naidu spoke to the Social Council of Calcutta in order to advocate for the education of Indian women. In her speech, Naidu stressed that the success of the whole movement relied upon the "woman question". Naidu claimed that the true "nation-builders" were women, not men, and that without women's active cooperation, the nationalist movement would be in vain. Naidu's speech argued that India's nationalism depended on women's rights, and that the liberation of India could not be separated from the liberation of women. The women's movement developed parallel to the independence movement for this reason.

In 1917, Naidu sponsored the establishment of the Women's Indian Association, which finally provided a platform for women to discuss their complaints and demand their rights. That same year, Naidu served as a spokesperson for a delegation of women that met with Edwin Montagu, the Secretary of State for India, and Lord Chelmsford, the Viceroy of India, in order to discuss reforms. The delegation expressed women's support for the introduction of self-government in India and demanded that the people of India should be given the right to vote, of which women must be included. The delegation was followed up with public meetings and political conferences supporting the demands, making it a huge success.

In 1918, Naidu moved a resolution on women's franchise to the Eighteenth Session of the Bombay Provincial Conference and to the special session of Congress held in Bombay. The purpose of the resolution was to have on record that the Conference was in support of the enfranchisement of women in order to demonstrate to Montagu that the men of India were not opposed to women's rights. In her speech at the Conference, Naidu emphasized "the influence of women in bringing about political and spiritual unity" in ancient India. She argued that women had always played an important role in political life in India and that rather than going against tradition, women's franchise would simply be giving back what was theirs all along.

In her speech at the Bombay Special Congress, Naidu claimed that the "right of franchise is a human right and not a monopoly of one sex only." She demanded the men of India to reflect on their humanity and restore the rights that belonged to women. Throughout the speech, Naidu attempted to alleviate worries by reassuring that women were only asking for the right to vote, not for any special privileges that would interfere with men. In fact, Naidu proposed that women would lay the foundation of nationalism, making women's franchise a necessity for the nation. Despite the increasing support of women's suffrage in India, which was backed by the Indian National Congress, the Muslim League, and others, the Southborough Franchise Committee, a British committee, decided against granting franchise to women.

The Montagu-Chelmsford Reforms had a shocking revelation: although the women's delegation appeared successful at the time, the reforms made no mention of women and had completely ignored their demands. In 1919, Naidu, as representative of the WIA, went to plead for the franchise of women before a Joint-Select Committee of Parliament in London. She presented a memorandum to the committee and provided evidence that the women of India were ready for the right to vote. The resulting Government of India Act 1919, however, did not enfranchise Indian women, instead leaving the decision to provincial councils. Between 1921 and 1930, the provincial councils approved of women's franchise but with limitations. The number of women actually eligible to vote was very small.

In the 1920s, Naidu began to focus more on the nationalist movement as a means of achieving both women's rights and political independence. Naidu became the first Indian female president of the Indian National Congress in 1925, demonstrating how influential she was as a political voice. By this period, Indian women were starting to get more involved in the movement. Female leaders began to organize nationwide strikes and nonviolent resistance across the country. In 1930, Naidu wrote a pamphlet that would be handed out to women with the goal of bringing them into the political struggle. The pamphlet stated that until recently, women had remained spectators, but now they had to get involved and play an active role. To Naidu, it was women's duty to help in the fight against Britain. In this way, Naidu asserted women's role as an agent of political change and effectively linked women to the struggle for independence from British rule.

=== Nonviolent resistance ===
Naidu formed close ties with Gandhi, Gopal Krishna Gokhale, Rabindranath Tagore and Sarala Devi Chaudhurani. After 1917, she joined Gandhi's satyagraha movement of nonviolent resistance against British rule. Naidu went to London in 1919 as a part of the All India Home Rule League as a part of her continued efforts to advocate for independence from British rule. The next year, she participated in the non-cooperation movement in India.

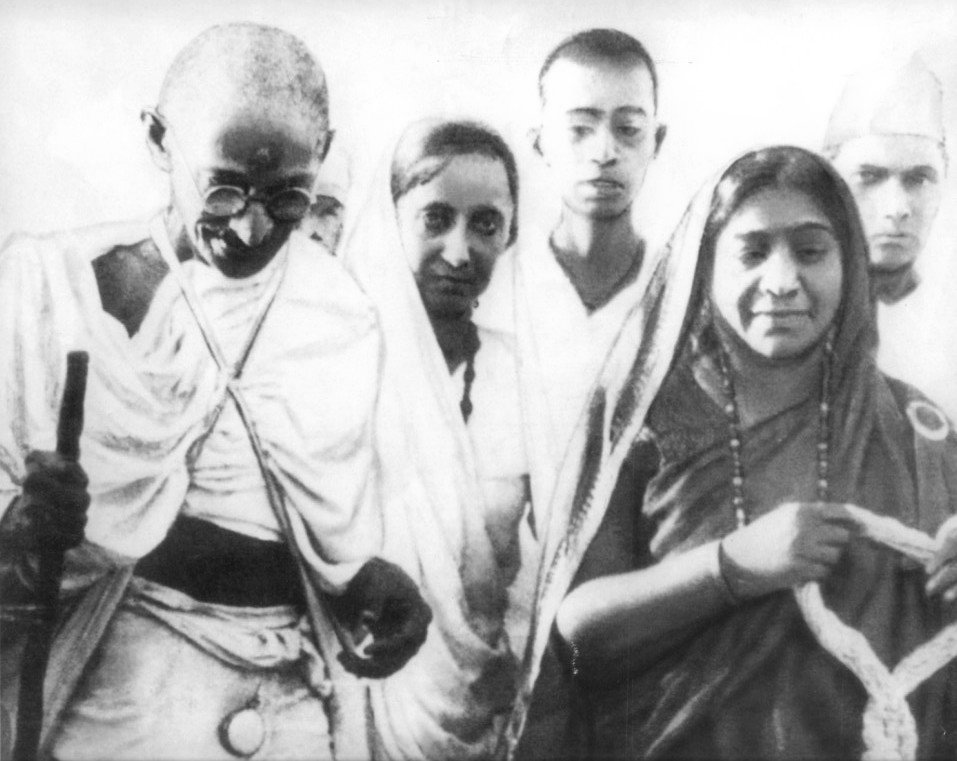
Naidu with Mahatma Gandhi during Salt Satyagraha, 1930

In 1924, Naidu represented the Indian National Congress at the East African Indian National Congress. In 1925, Naidu was the first Indian female president of the Indian National Congress. In 1927, Naidu was a founding member of the All India Women's Conference. In 1928, she travelled in the United States to promote nonviolent resistance. Naidu also presided over East African and Indian Congress' 1929 session in South Africa.

In 1930, Gandhi initially did not want to permit women to join the Salt March, because it would be physically demanding with a high risk of arrest. Naidu and other female activists, including Kamaladevi Chattopadhyay and Khurshed Naoroji, persuaded him otherwise, and joined the march. When Gandhi was arrested on 6 April 1930, he appointed Naidu as the new leader of the campaign.

The Indian National Congress decided to stay away from the First Round Table Conference that took place in London owing to the arrests. In 1931, however, Naidu and other leaders of the Congress Party participated in the Second Round Table Conference headed by Viceroy Lord Irwin in the wake of the Gandhi-Irwin pact. Naidu was jailed by the British in 1932.

The British jailed Naidu again in 1942 for her participation in the Quit India Movement. She was imprisoned for 21 months.

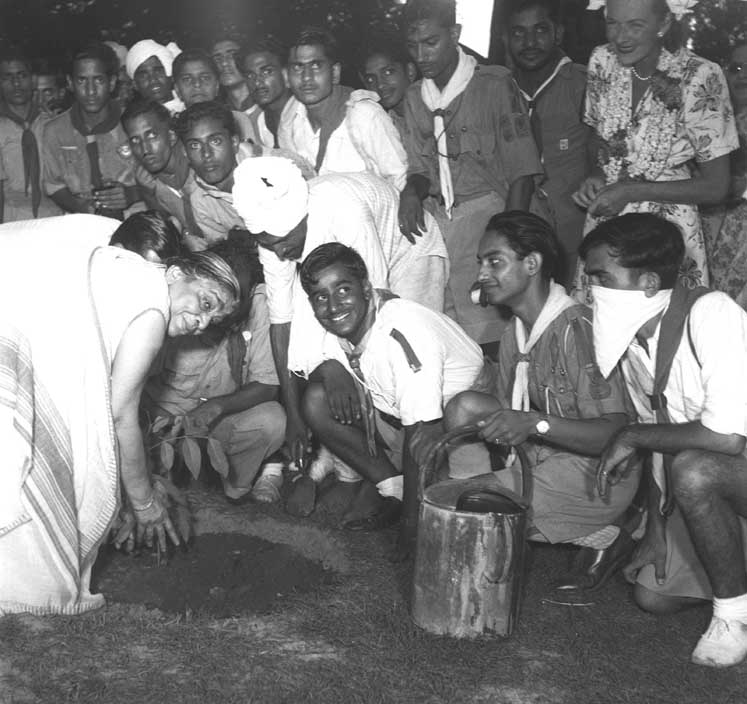
Naidu plants a tree in Mehrauli, Delhi, 1947

She was elected to the Constituent Assembly of India to represent the state of Bihar, however died before the Constitution was finalized and put to vote. She gave her only speech at the Constituent Assembly on 11 December 1946.

=== Governor of United Provinces ===
Following India's independence from the British rule in 1947, Naidu was appointed the governor of the United Provinces (present-day Uttar Pradesh), making her India's first woman governor. She remained in office until her death in March 1949 (aged 70).

== Writing career ==
Naidu began writing at the age of 12. Her play, Maher Muneer, written in Persian, impressed the Nizam of Kingdom of Hyderabad.

Naidu's poetry was written in English and usually took the form of lyric poetry in the tradition of British Romanticism, which she was sometimes challenged to reconcile with her Indian nationalist politics. She was known for her vivid use of rich sensory images in her writing, and for her lush depictions of India. She was well-regarded as a poet, considered the "Indian Yeats".

Her first book of poems was published in London in 1905, titled "The Golden Threshold". The publication was suggested by Edmund Gosse, and bore an introduction by Arthur Symons. It also included a sketch of Naidu as a teenager, in a ruffled white dress, drawn by John Butler Yeats. Her second and most strongly nationalist book of poems, The Bird of Time, was published in 1912. It was published in both London and New York, and includes "In the Bazaars of Hyderabad". The last book of new poems published in her lifetime, The Broken Wing (1917). It includes the poem "The Gift of India", which exhorted the Indian people to remember the sacrifices of the Indian Army during World War I, which she had previously recited to the Hyderabad Ladies' War Relief Association in 1915. It also includes "Awake!", dedicated to Muhammad Ali Jinnah, which she read as the conclusion to a 1915 speech to the Indian National Congress to urge unified Indian action. A collection of all her published poems was printed in New York in 1928. After her death, Naidu's unpublished poems were collected in The Feather of the Dawn (1961), edited by her daughter Padmaja Naidu.

Naidu's speeches were first collected and published in January 1918 as The Speeches and Writings of Sarojini Naidu, a popular publication which led to an expanded reprint in 1919 and again in 1925.

=== Works ===
- 1905: The Golden Threshold, London: William Heineman
- 1915: The Bird of Time: Songs of Life, Death & the Spring, London: William Heineman and New York: John Lane Company
- 1917: The Broken Wing: Songs of Love, Death and Destiny
- 1919: "The Song of the Palanquin Bearers", lyrics by Naidu and music by Martin Shaw, London: Curwen
- 1920: The Speeches and Writings of Sarojini Naidu, Madras: G.A. Natesan & Co.
- 1922: Editor, Muhammad Ali Jinnah, An Ambassador of Unity: His Speeches & Writings 1912–1917, with a biographical "Pen Portrait" of Jinnah by Naidu, Madras: Ganesh & Co.
- 1928: The Sceptred Flute: Songs of India, New York: Dodd, Mead, & Co.
- 1961: The Feather of the Dawn, edited by Padmaja Naidu, Bombay: Asia Publishing House

== Death ==
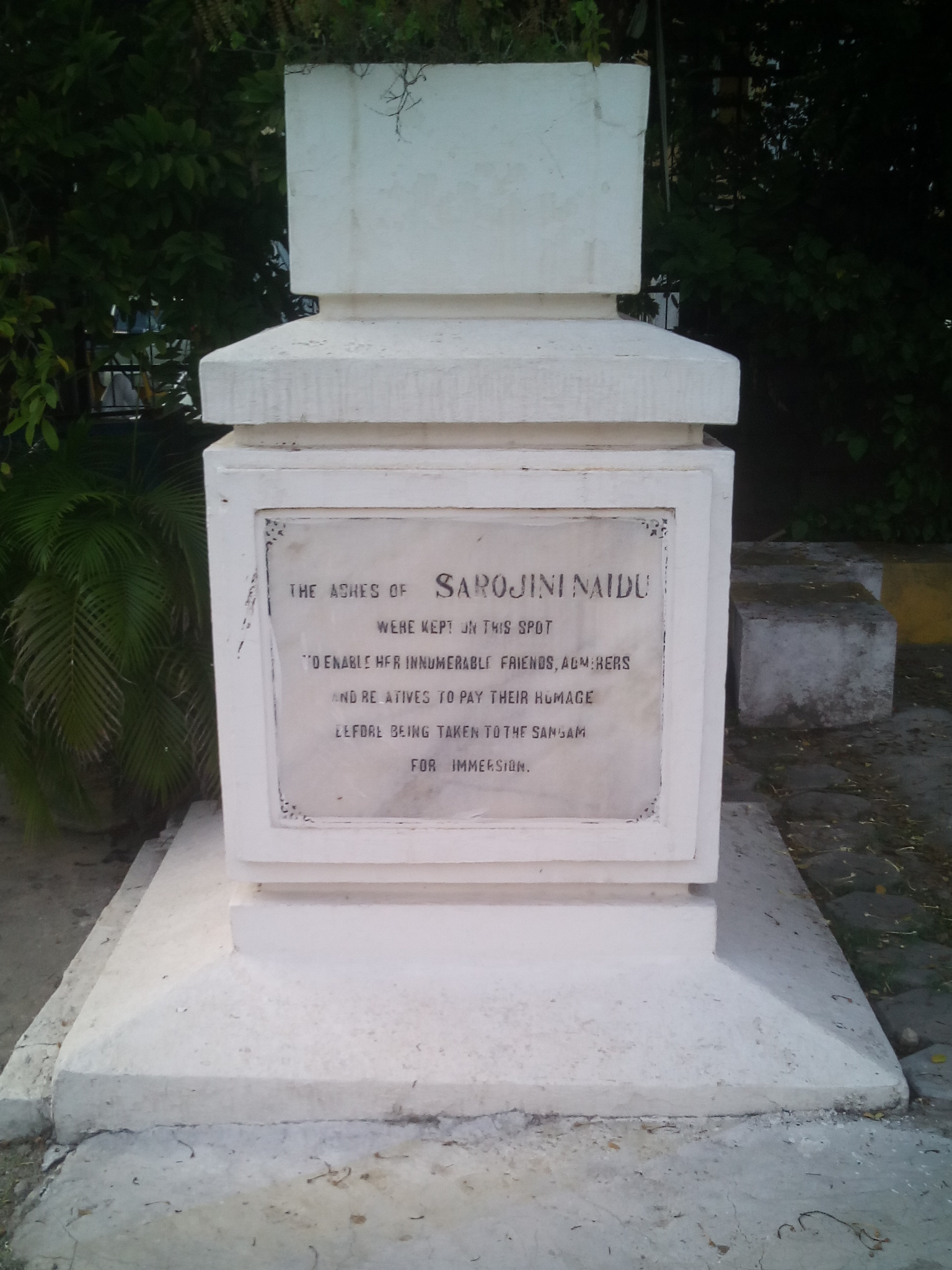
The ashes of Naidu kept at Golden Threshold, Hyderabad before immersion

Naidu died of cardiac arrest at 3:30 p.m. (IST) on 2 March 1949 at the Government House in Lucknow. Upon her return from New Delhi on 15 February, she was advised to rest by her doctors, and all official engagements were canceled. Her health deteriorated substantially and bloodletting was performed on the night of 1 March after she complained of severe [headache]. She collapsed following a fit of cough. Naidu was said to have asked the nurse attending to her to sing to her at about 10:40 p.m. (IST) which put her to sleep. She subsequently died, and her last rites were performed at the Gomati River.

== Legacy ==
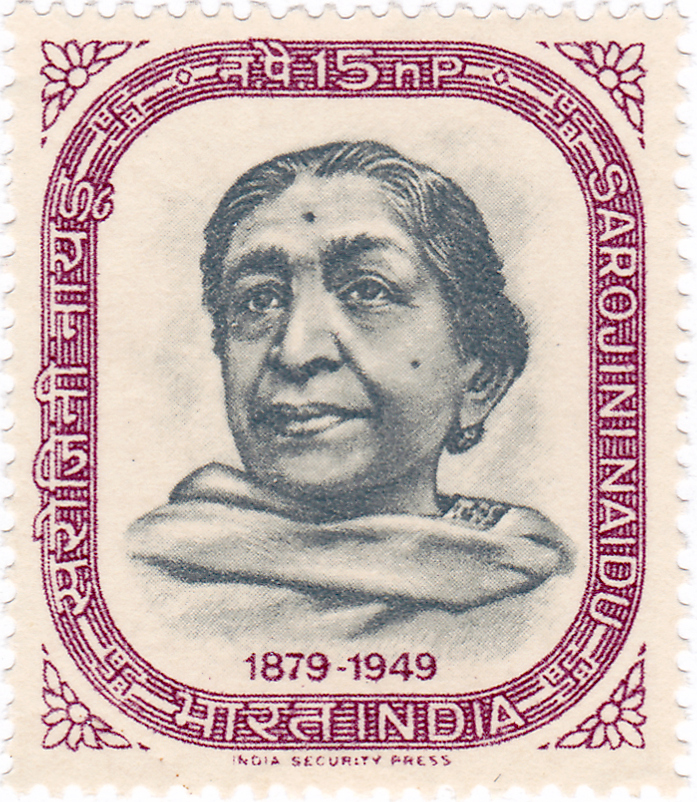
Sarojini Naidu 1964 stamp of India

Naidu is known as "one of India's feminist luminaries". Naidu's birthday, 13 February, is celebrated as Women's Day to recognise powerful voices of women in India's history.

Composer Helen Searles Westbrook (1889–1967) set Naidu's text to music in her song "Invincible." In 2021-2022, Indian-American composer Shruthi Rajasekar created a large musical work called Sarojini on Naidu's life and the Independence movement, using text from Naidu's poetry and speeches.

As a poet, Naidu was known as the "Nightingale of India". Edmund Gosse called her "the most accomplished living poet in India" in 1919.

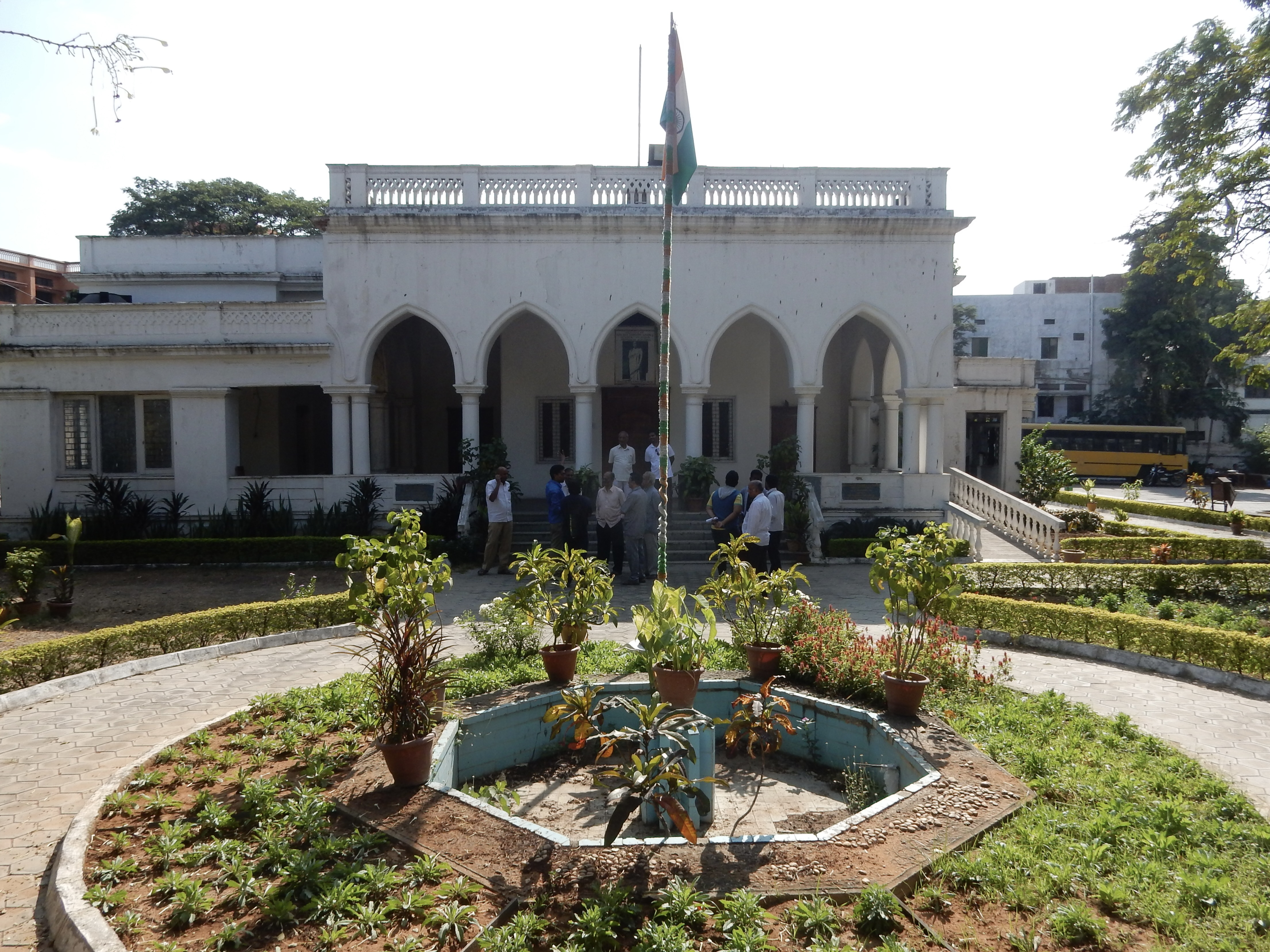
Golden Threshold in 2015

Naidu is memorialized in the Golden Threshold, an off-campus annex of University of Hyderabad named for her first collection of poetry. Golden Threshold now houses the Sarojini Naidu School of Arts & Communication in the University of Hyderabad. Also, Sarojini Devi Eye Hospital in Hyderabad is named after her.

Asteroid 5647 Sarojininaidu, discovered by Eleanor Helin at Palomar Observatory in 1990, was named in her memory. The official naming citation was published by the Minor Planet Center on 27 August 2019 (M.P.C. 115893).

In 2014, Google India commemorated Naidu's 135th birth anniversary with a Google Doodle.

=== Works about Naidu ===
The first biography of Naidu, Sarojini Naidu: a Biography by Padmini Sengupta, was published in 1966. A biography for children, Sarojini Naidu: The Nightingale and The Freedom Fighter, was published by Hachette in 2014.

In 1975, the Government of India Films Division produced a twenty-minute documentary about Naidu's life, "Sarojini Naidu – The Nightingale of India", directed by Bhagwan Das Garga.

In 2020, a biopic was announced, titled Sarojini, to be directed by Akash Nayak and Dhiraj Mishra, and starring Dipika Chikhlia as Naidu.

== See also ==
- Indian English literature
- Indian literature
- Indian poetry
- Indian poetry in English
- List of Indian poets
- List of Indian writers
