= 2000 in public domain =

When a work's copyright expires, it enters the public domain. The following is a list of works that entered the public domain in 2000. Since laws vary globally, the copyright status of some works are not uniform.

== Entered the public domain in countries with life + 70 years ==
With the exception of Belarus (Life + 50 years) and Spain (Life + 80 years for creators that died before 1987), a work enters the public domain in Europe 70 years after the creator's death, if it was published during the creator's lifetime. The list is sorted alphabetically and includes a notable work of the creator that entered the public domain on January 1, 2000.

| Names | Country | Birth | Death | Occupation | Notable work |
|---|---|---|---|---|---|
| Anna Bowman Dodd | United States | 21 January 1858 | January 1929 | novelist, dystopian fiction writer, short story writer, travel writer, political writer | The Republic of the Future, Falaise : the town of the conqueror, In and out of three Normandy inns, The new woman in Turkey : how ancient rights and modern dress protect and improve the lot of Turkish women, Talleyrand : the training of a statesman, 1754-1838 |
| Leonard Cline | United States | 11 May 1893 | c. 15 January 1929 | novelist, horror fiction writer, poet, short story writer, journalist, and translator | The Dark Chamber, God Head, Listen, Moon!, The Lady of Frozen Death and Other Weird Tales |
| Hans Prutz | Germany | 20 May 1843 | 29 January 1929 | historian, medievalist | Kaiser Friedrich I., Quellenbeiträge zur Geschichte der Kreuzzüge, Kulturgeschichte der Kreuzzüge, Staatengeschichte des Abendlandes Im Mittelalter, Entwickelung und Untergang des Tempelherrenordens |
| Charlotte Carmichael Stopes | United Kingdom | 5 February 1840 | 6 February 1929 | Shakespearean scholar, women's rights activist | British Freewomen: Their Historical Privilege, The Bacon/Shakespeare Question, Shakespeare's Family, Shakespeare's Warwickshire Contemporaries, Burbage and Shakespeare's Stage, The Sphere of 'Man' in Relation to that of 'Woman' in the Constitution, The Life of Henry, Third Earl of Southampton |
| Auguste Groner | Austria | 16 April 1850 | 7 March 1929 | writer of detective fiction, juvenile fiction, and historical fiction | The Case of the Pocket Diary Found in the Snow, The Golden Bullet, How I Was Murdered, Why she extinguished the light, The Pharaoh's Bracelet, The Secret of the Hermitage |
| Grace Rhys | Ireland | 12 July 1865 | 15 March 1929 | novelist, historical fiction writer, essayist | Mary Dominic, The Charming of Estercel, The Wooing of Sheila, Five Beads on a String |
| Katharine Lee Bates | United States | 12 August 1859 | 28 March 1929 | social reformer, poet, lyricist, textbook writer, diarist | America the Beautiful, Goody Santa Claus on a Sleigh Ride, Yellow Clover: A Book of Remembrance, The English Religious Drama, The Story of Chaucer's Canterbury Pilgrims, An Autobiography, in Brief, of Katharine Lee Bates |
| Santeri Nuorteva | Soviet Union | 29 June 1881 | 31 March 1929 | journalist, magazine editor, politician | claimed writer of the forged Sisson Documents, English translator of Letter to American Workers by Vladimir Lenin, editor of the daily newspaper Toveri(The Comrade) and the monthly magazine Säkeniä (The Spark) |
| Flora Annie Steel | United Kingdom | 2 April 1847 | 12 April 1929 | novelist, short story writer, education reformer, popular historian | On the Face of the Waters, The Complete Indian Housekeeper and Cook, English Fairy Tales, From the Five Rivers, Tales of the Punjab, India through the ages; a popular and picturesque history of Hindustan, Mistress of Men |
| John Morris-Jones | United Kingdom | 17 October 1864 | 16 April 1929 | grammarian, academic, poet, and translator | Welsh Orthography, A Welsh Grammar, Historical and Comparative: phonology and accidence, editor of the manuscript collection The Elucidarium and other tracts in Welsh from Llyvyr agkyr Llandewivrevi A.D. 1346 |
| Lucy Clifford | United Kingdom | 2 August 1846 | 21 April 1929 | novelist, horror fiction writer, playwright and journalist | The New Mother, Mrs. Keith's Crime, Love Letters of a Worldly Woman, A Flash of Summer: The Story of a Simple Woman's Life, A Long Duel: A Serious Comedy, A Woman Alone |
| Mary E. Mann | United Kingdom | 14 August 1848 | 19 May 1929 | novelist, short story writer, playwright | Tales of Dulditch, The Patten Experiment, Little Brother, The Victim, Confessions of a Coward and Coquette. Being the record of a short period of her life as told by herself., There was once a Prince, Out in Life's Rain, The memories of Ronald Love |
| Bliss Carman | Canada | 15 April 1861 | 8 June 1929 | poet, one of the Confederation Poets | Sappho: One Hundred Lyrics, Songs From Vagabondia, A Seamark: A Threnody for Robert Louis Stevenson, Ballads of Lost Haven: A Book Of The Sea, By The Aurelian Wall: And Other Elegies, Pipes Of Pan: From the Book of Myths, The Rough Rider: And Other Poems, The Dead Faun |
| Vedam Venkataraya Sastry | India | 21 December 1853 | 18 June 1929 | dramatist, poet, literary critic, translator, and dictionary editor | Usha Parinayam, chief editor of the dictionary Suryaraya Andhra Nighantuvu |
| Ellen Thorneycroft Fowler | United Kingdom | 9 April 1860 | 22 June 1929 | writer of romances and children's literature, poet | Verses Grave and Gay, Concerning Isabel Carnaby, Fuel of Fire, Place and Power, Kate of Kate Hall, Miss Fallowfield's Fortune, Her Ladyship's Conscience |
| Georges Courteline | France | 25 June 1858 | 25 June 1929 | dramatist, novelist, satirist, literary reviewer | Les Gaités de l'escadron, Les Femmes d'amis, Ombres Parisiennes, Hortense, couche-toi!, Godefroy |
| Edward Carpenter | United Kingdom | 29 August 1844 | 28 June 1929 | philosopher, utopian socialist, poet, travel writer, activist and advocate for gay rights, sexual liberation, prison reform, vegetarianism, and the Christ myth theory | Civilisation: Its Cause and Cure, Simplification of Life, Towards Democracy, From Adam's Peak to Elephanta: Sketches in Ceylon and India, Pagan and Christian Creeds, Moses: A Drama in Five Acts, Homogenic Love and Its Place in a Free Society |
| Hugo von Hofmannsthal | Austria | 1 January 1874 | 15 July 1929 | novelist, librettist, poet, dramatist, essayist, and screenwriter. A member of the Modernist literary group Young Vienna | Jedermann, The Lord Chandos Letter, the screenplay for the film Der Rosenkavalier (1926), the libretti for the operas Elektra, Der Rosenkavalier, Ariadne auf Naxos, Die Frau ohne Schatten, Die ägyptische Helena, and Arabella (1933) |
| José de Castro | Portugal | 7 April 1868 | 31 July 1929 | lawyer, journalist, politician, prime minister of Portugal in 1915 | redactor of the newspaper O Districto da Guarda, founder of the republican newspaper O Povo Português |
| Mary MacLane | United States | 1 May 1881 | c. 6 August 1929 | memoirist, screenwriter | The Story of Mary MacLane, My Friend Annabel Lee, I, Mary Maclane: A Diary of Human Days, the screenplay for her autobiographical film Men Who Have Made Love to Me (1918) |
| Rainis | Latvia | 11 September 1865 | 11 September 1929 | playwright, translator, poet, and politician | Uguns un nakts (Fire and Night), Indulis un Ārija (Indulis and Ārija), Iļja Muromietis (Ilya Muromets), Rīgas ragana (The Witch of Riga), Zelta Zirgs (The Golden Horse) |
| Francis Darwin | United Kingdom | 16 August 1848 | 19 September 1929 | botanist, literary editor | The Power of Movement in Plants, an expanded second edition of Insectivorous Plants, The Practical Physiology of Plants, Elements of Botany, Rustic Sounds and Other Studies in Literature and Natural History |
| Arno Holz | Germany | 26 April 1863 | October 1929 | Naturalist poet, dramatist | Phantasus, Buch der Zeit (book of time), Papa Hamlet, Die Familie Selicke, Change in Dramatic Time |
| Max Lehmann | Germany | 19 May 1845 | 8 October 1929 | historian, specialist in military history | Das Aufgebot zur Heerfahrt Ottos II nach Italien (Otto II's military expedition in Italy), Der Krieg von 1870 bis zur Einschliessung von Metz (The War of 1870 up to the encirclement of Metz), Friedrich der Grosse und der Ursprung des siebenjärigen Krieges (Frederick the Great and the origin of the Seven Years' War), Die Erhebung von 1813 (The uprising of 1813) |
| Alexandru Davila | Romania | 12 February 1862 | 19 October 1929 | dramatist, memoirist, diplomat, public administrator, and police inspector | Vlaicu Vodă, Din torsul zilelor |
| Olav Aukrust | Norway | 21 January 1883 | 3 November 1929 | Romantic poet, teacher | Himmelvarden |
| Harry Crosby | United States | 4 June 1898 | 10 December 1929 | poet, diarist, and publisher. A member of the Lost Generation of expatriate writers, and co-founder of the publishing company Black Sun Press | Sonnets for Caresse, Red Skeletons, Chariot of the Sun, Shadows of the Sun, Transit of Venus, Mad Queen, Sleeping Together, Aphrodite in Flight: Being Some Observations on the Aerodynamics of Love, Collected Poems of Harry Crosby, War Letters |
| Ella M. S. Marble | United States | 10 August 1850 | 1929 | physician, journalist, newspaper editor, educator, and public lecturer | primarily known for writing works on physical culture for women and "healthful" dress |
| Dallas Lore Sharp | United States | 1870 | 1929 | academic, assistant librarian, nature writer, ornithologist | Wildlife Near Home, A Watcher in the Woods, Ways of the Woods, In American Fields and Forests, Where Rolls the Oregon, The Hills of Hingham, Highlands and Hollows, The Magical Chance, Romances frrm the Old Testament, Christ and His Time |
| Evelyn Whitaker | United Kingdom | 1844 | 1929 | children's writer, novelist, short story writer | Miss Toosey's Mission, Laddie, Tip Cat, Our Little Ann, For the Fourth Time of Asking, Lassie, Peter's Adventure, The Tidy Wood. A Tale |

== Entered the public domain in countries with life + 50 years ==
In most countries of Africa and Asia, as well as Belarus, Bolivia, Canada, New Zealand, Egypt and Uruguay; a work enters the public domain 50 years after the creator's death.

| Names | Country | Birth | Death | Occupation | Notable work |
|---|---|---|---|---|---|
| Mary L. Langworthy | United States | 31 March 1872 | 15 January 1949 | dramatic coach, pageant writer, librettist and lecturer | the libretto for the opera Elijah, the pageants The Hall and the Forga, Plantation Memories, Independence Day, As the Child Learns, The Soul of Man |
| William Price Drury | United Kingdom | 8 November 1861 | 21 January 1949 | novelist, playwright, and memoirist | The Flag Lieutenant, a naval comedy in four acts, The Tadpole of an Archangel, The Dead Marines, The Petrified Eye and Other Stories Originally Told to the Marines, Bearers of the Burden Being Stories of Land and Sea, The Peradventures of Private Pagett, The Admiral Speaks, Calamity Jane, RN, The Porter of Hell: A Drama of 1914, In Many Parts: The Memoirs of a Marine, The Flag Lieutenant in China |
| N. D. Cocea | Romania | 29 November 1880 | 1 February 1949 | writer of erotic literature, novelist, satirist, polemicist, journalist, and political activist | Poet-Poetă, Vinul de viață lungă, Fecior de slugă, Pentr-un petec de negreață, Nea Nae |
| Axel Munthe | Sweden | 31 October 1857 | 11 February 1949 | physician, psychiatrist, and autobiographer | The Story of San Michele, Memories and Vagaries, Letters From A Mourning City |
| Sarojini Naidu | India | 13 February 1879 | 2 March 1949 | poet, playwright, political activist for the Indian independence movement, politician | In the Bazaars of Hyderabad, The Bird of Time, The Golden Threshold, Maher Muneer, The Broken Wing, The Feather of the Dawn, The Speeches and Writings of Sarojini Naidu |
| Maurice Maeterlinck | Belgium | 29 August 1862 | 6 May 1949 | playwright, poet, and essayist | Princess Maleine, Intruder, The Blind, Pelléas and Mélisande, The Treasure of the Humble, The Blue Bird |
| Klaus Mann | Germany | 18 November 1906 | 21 May 1949 | novelist, and essayist. Representative of Exilliteratur | Escape to Life, Mephisto, The Turning Point, The Pious Dance, Adventure Book of a Youth, Rundherum |
| Sigrid Undset | Norway | 20 May 1882 | 10 June 1949 | novelist, writer of historical fiction | Kristin Lavransdatter, Jenny, Vaaren, The Master of Hestviken, Fru Marta Oulie |
| Oton Župančič | Slovenia | 23 January 1878 | 11 June 1949 | Modernist poet, playwright, stage director, and translator | Čaša opojnosti (The Goblet of Inebriation), Pesem mladine (The Song of Youth), Duma, Kovaška (The Blacksmith's Song), Žebljarska (The Nail Maker's Song), Noč za verne duše (A Night for Faithful Souls), Veronika Deseniška (Veronika of Desenice) |
| Russell Doubleday | United States | 26 May 1872 | 14 June 1949 | writer, editor and publisher | A Gunner Aboard the Yankee, Cattle Ranch to College, Stories of Inventors, Photography is Fun, Tree Neighbors |
| Elsa Bernstein | Austria | 27 October 1866 | 2 July 1949 | dramatist, salonist, actress, memoirist | Königskinder, Das Leben als Drama. Erinnerungen an Theresienstadt, Wir Drei(We Three), Dämmerung (Twilight) |
| Hermann Grab | Czechoslovakia | 6 May 1903 | 2 August 1949 | novelist, short story writer, music critic, musician, and music teacher | Der Stadtpark (Town Park), Hochzeit in Brooklyn (Marriage in Brooklyn) |
| E. H. Young | United Kingdom | 21 March 1880 | 8 August 1949 | novelist, children's writer, mountaineer, and school librarian | Miss Mole, Moor Fires, The Vicar's Daughter, Jenny Wren, The Curate's Wife, Chatterton Square, River Holiday |
| Margaret Mitchell | United States | 8 November 1900 | 16 August 1949 | novelist, historical fiction writer, journalist | Gone with the Wind, Lost Laysen, Ropa Carmagin, The Big Four, The Knight and the Lady, The Arrow Brave and the Deer Maiden, The Greaser, The Little Pioneers, When We Were Shipwrecked |
| Herbert Eulenberg | Germany | 25 January 1876 | 4 September 1949 | playwright, poet, publisher, and essayist | Letter of a Father of our Times, Münchhausen. Ein deutsches Schauspiel, Kassandra. Ein Drama, Ikarus und Daedalus, Das Ende der Marienburg. Ein Akt aus der Geschichte, Anna Boleyn, Die Prä-Raphaeliten |
| Lucien Descaves | France | 16 March 1861 | 6 September 1949 | novelist | Le Calvaire de Héloïse Pajadou (Héloïse Pajadou's Calvary) |
| Will Cuppy | United States | 23 August 1884 | 19 September 1949 | humorist, satirist, literary critic, and columnist | Maroon Tales, How to be a Hermit, How to Tell Your Friends from the Apes, How to Become Extinct, The Decline and Fall of Practically Everybody, The Great Bustard and Other People |
| George Shiels | Ireland | 24 June 1881 | 19 September 1949 | dramatist, short story writer, and poet | The Rugged Path, The Passing Day, The New Gossoon, Bedmates, Moodie in Manitoba, Insurance Money, The Retrievers, The Jailbird, Quin's Secret |
| Jorge Cáceres | Chile | 18 April 1923 | 21 September 1949 | poet, painter, and dancer | Bound for the Great Polar Pyramid, René or celestial mechanics, Monument to the Birds, The frac incubator |
| Jacques Copeau | France | 4 February 1879 | 20 October 1949 | dramatist, theatre director and producer, actor, and theatre reviewer | Brouillard du matin (Morning Fog), Un essai de rénovation Dramatique: le théâtre du Vieux-Colombier (Essay on Dramatic Renewal: The Théâtre du Vieux-Colombier, Le Veuf (The Widower), Le Miracle du pain doré (The Miracle of the Golden Bread), Le Petit Pauvre (The Poor Little One) |
| T. Rowland Hughes | United Kingdom | 17 April 1903 | 24 October 1949 | novelist. dramatist, poet, broadcaster, and scriptwriter for radio shows | William Jones, Chwalfa, Storïau Mawr y Byd (Great Stories of the World), Y Ffordd (The Way), Yr Ogof (The Cave, O Law i Law (From Hand to Hand) |
| Yaroslav Halan | Ukraine | 27 July 1902 | 24 October 1949 | playwright, publicist, journalist, war correspondent in World War II, and anticlerical propagandist | Unforgettable Days, Don Quixote from Ettenheim, 99%, Front on Air, In the service of Satan, Father of Darkness and His Henchmen, The Vatican Idols Thirst for Blood, Twilight of the Alien Gods, The Vatican Without Mask, I Spit on the Pope |
| Rex Beach | United States | 1 September 1877 | 7 December 1949 | adventure fiction writer, novelist, playwright, Olympic water polo player, and gold prospector during the Klondike Gold Rush | The Spoilers, The Silver Horde, Going Some, The Ne'er-Do-Well, Rainbow's End, Laughing Bill Hyde, The Winds of Chance, Too Fat to Fight, Flowing Gold, Son of the Gods |
| Harriet Ford | United States | 1863 | 12 December 1949 | actress, playwright, and poet | Back from the Dead, The Argyle Case, The Fourth Estate, The Greatest Thing in the World, A Gentleman of France, The Little Brother of the Rich, The Dummy, The Wrong Number, Where Julia rules; a comedy in four acts |
| Hervey Allen | United States | 8 December 1889 | 28 December 1949 | historical fiction writer, memoirist, biographer, poet, and educator | Anthony Adverse, Ballads of the Border, Toward the Flame, Wampum and Old Gold, Israfel |

== Entering the public domain in the United States ==
In the United States, the copyright status of works extends for the life of the author or artists, plus 70 years. If the work is owned by a corporation, then the copyright extends 95 years.

Due to the passing of the Copyright Term Extension Act (Sonny Bono Copyright Term Extension Act) in 1998, no new works would enter the public domain in this jurisdiction until 2019.

== See also ==
- 1899 in literature, 1929 in literature and 1949 in literature for deaths of writers
- Public Domain Day
- Creative Commons
