= Murse World =

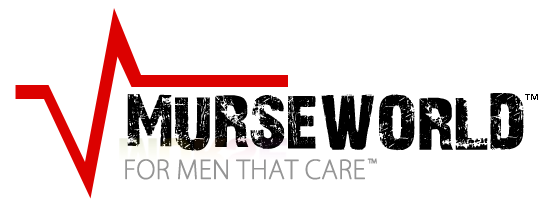
- Type: Private
- Industry: Retail
- Founded: West Hollywood, CA (2011)
- Founder: Alex Mayzels and Scott Topiol
- Headquarters: New Jersey, U.S.
- Area served: United States
- Products: Scrubs
- Website: www.murseworld.com

Murse World is an American online retailer of medical scrubs and accessories, like stethoscopes, designed for male nurses. The company was founded in 2011 by Scott Topiol and Alex Mayzels, in New Jersey.

== History ==
Murse World was founded in December 2011 by Alex Mayzels and Scott Topiol, a Registered Nurse (RN). To date, the company is the only scrubs store that caters exclusively to men in nursing and other healthcare professions. The company was founded as an alternative to traditional uniform retailers who primarily focused on women's products. Prior to Murse World's launch, men were typically faced with small selections or expected to wear unisex clothing. The company's founders believe that the scrubs industry has largely ignored the growth of nursing as a men's profession and that the products they sell will help make the job more appealing.

== Partnership with AAMN ==
Murse World announced the formation of a strategic partnership with The American Assembly for Men in Nursing (AAMN) on October 4, 2012. The purpose of this partnership was to help promote nursing as a career option for men and to raise awareness of the needs of men in nursing within the medical uniform industry.

In 2013, Murse World launched an annual student nurse scholarship through the AAMN Foundation. This scholarship provides financial support to male undergraduate students seeking licensure as a Registered Nurse.

In December 2018, Murse World announced a renewed partnership with AAMN in effort to further assist men in nursing.

== 2013 Rose Parade Nurses' Float ==
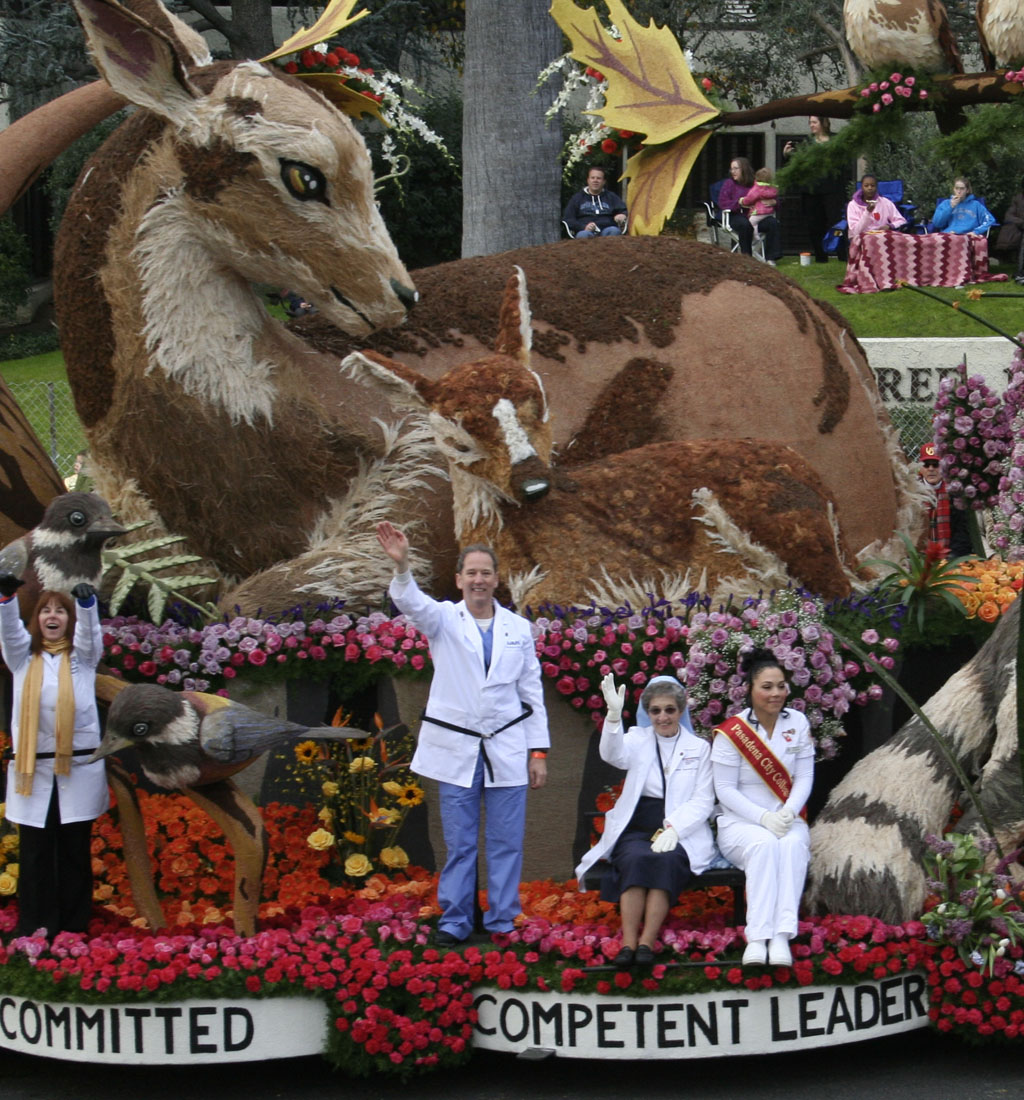
Murse World scrubs at the 2013 Rose Parade

On January 1, 2013, the first float honoring nurses appeared in 124th annual Rose Parade. The float was inspired by the election of Registered Nurse Sally Bixby as the parade's president. The float's 10 riders were each chosen to represent diversity in nursing. Among the riders was Bob Patterson of AAMN. Patterson was the only male nurse to ride the float and represented nursing as a men's profession. The scrubs and lab coat worn by Patterson during the parade were customized and donated by Murse World in support of the historic event.
