= B. M. Croker =

Irish novelist (1847-1920)

Bithia Mary Croker
- Born: 28 May 1847; Warrenpoint, County Down, Northern Ireland
- Died: 20 October 1920 (aged 73); London, England
- Occupation: Writer
- Spouse: John Croker (m. 1871; died 1911)
- Children: Eileen Whitaker MBE
- Parents: William Sheppard; Bithia Mary Watson
- Writing career
- Genres: Romance; adventure; ghost stories
- Notable works: Proper Pride; Pretty Miss Neville; Diana Barrington; Mr Jervis

Bithia Mary Croker (née Sheppard, 28 May 1847 – 20 October 1920) was an Irish novelist most known for her works concerning life and society in British India. She also wrote ghost stories.

== Life ==
Croker was born in 1847 in Warrenpoint, County Down, Northern Ireland. Her birth year was not publicly known for a long time, which is why later years are also stated sometimes. She was the only daughter of Rev. William Sheppard, the Anglican Church of Ireland rector of Kilgefin, County Roscommon, who was an ex-barrister, and Bithia Mary Sheppard. Her younger brother William Harry Cope Sheppard went on to become president of the Dublin rugby union club Wanderers F. C. Her father died in 1855 after a protracted illness, when Bithia was eight years old. She spent parts of her childhood in Roscommon and was educated at Rock Ferry, Cheshire and in Tours, France. She became famous as a horsewoman with the Kildare Hunt.

In 1871, she married John Stokes Croker, an officer in the Royal Scots Fusiliers and later the Royal Munster Fusiliers, in Rathangan, County Kildare, and they lived there for some time in Oakley House. Soon after, Croker followed her husband to Madras and then to Bengal. Exclusive of trips home, she lived in India for 14 years between 1872 and 1892. Her only child, Gertrude Eileen Celeste Croker, was born in Bangalore in December 1872 and baptized in Madras in January 1873. Eileen was later also educated at Rock Ferry, married Albert Edward Whitaker and was appointed MBE. Croker spent some time in the hill station of Wellington now in Tamil Nadu, where she wrote many of her works, having begun to do so as a distraction during the hot season. After her husband's retirement with the rank of lieutenant-colonel in 1892, the couple moved to Lordello House in Shankill (not Bray, County Wicklow, as often stated) south of Dublin, then to London, and finally to Folkestone, Kent, where her husband died in 1911. Croker remained immensely interested in reading, travel and theatre. She died at 30 Dorset Square, London, on 20 October 1920 and was buried in Folkestone.

== Writing ==
Croker's prolific literary career spanned 38 years, from 1882 when she was 35 years old, until her death in London in 1920. Her last novel, The House of Rest, was published posthumously in 1921. She wrote 42 novels and 7 volumes of short stories.

Her first novel, Proper Pride (1882), was written secretly in Secunderabad in 1880, then read aloud to other women. After she had sent the original manuscript to an editor and hadn't heard back for many months, she thought it was lost, rewrote it from memory and eventually had it published anonymously in the UK. Thought to be by a man, it received good reviews and had been reprinted 12 times by 1896. William Ewart Gladstone was observed reading it in the House of Commons. The book, according to a present-day account, "shows open sympathy with the male viewpoint and metes out punishing treatment to its spirited, horse-riding heroine, whose distrustful pride separates her from her devoted husband."

Croker's work has been praised in general for "a sensitive ear for speech, for idiom and the diction of different classes, which she reproduces in lively and entertaining dialogue." Tension often derives from threats to conventional order in society. Her second novel, Pretty Miss Neville (1883), credited to her as B. M. Croker, was as popular as the first. The burden of social convention for a woman in India unwilling to marry the man for whom she has been sent out is explored in The Cat's Paw (1902), and that of a man who sinks socially in The Company's Servant (1907). Her Village Tales and Jungle Tragedies (1895) reflect a parallel interest in Indian rural life. Altogether 17 of the novels were set in India, one in Burma, and seven in Ireland. One of her novels set in Ireland, Terence (1899), was adapted for the stage and ran for two years in the United States.

There are intimations of Gothic fiction in some of Croker's work. Her 1905 story The Little Brass God, for example, involves a statue of Kali, described as a "goddess of destruction", who brings various misfortunes on the Anglo-Indians who possess it. The curse is dispelled when the statue is stolen from them and dropped down a well.

It has been claimed that her 1917 novel The Road to Mandalay, set in Burma, was the uncredited basis for the 1926 American silent film of the same name directed by Tod Browning, of which only a 35 min version has been restored. However, the similarities between the two works are less than striking and possibly coincidental.

Several of Croker's novels appeared in German, Czech, French, Spanish, Hungarian, Swedish and Norwegian translations. She was the most published author in the popular German low-budget edition Engelhorns allgemeine Romanbibliothek (Engelhorn's general novel library, 1884–1930), with 31 of her novels and story collections published in German translations, ahead of German Richard Voss (25) and French Georges Ohnet (21).

Croker had a wide literary acquaintance in London. Her novel Angel (1901) was dedicated to another novelist whose work centres on India: Alice Perrin. The author and academic Douglas Sladen went so far as to call her, with her "valued friends" Perrin and Flora Annie Steel, "three who have long divided the Indian Empire with Rudyard Kipling as a realm of fiction. Each in her own department is supreme."

A volume of her ghost stories was edited by Richard Dalby at the turn of the millennium. Her story To Let (c. 1893) was included in The Oxford Book of Victorian Ghost Stories.

== Bibliography ==
=== Novels ===
- Proper Pride: A Novel (London: Tinsley Brothers, 1882, 3 vol.) ISBN 978-1333220228
- Pretty Miss Neville (London: Tinsley Brothers, 1883, 3 vol.) ISBN 978-1020289781
- Some One Else (London: Sampson Low, 1885, 3 vol.) ISBN 9781770912540
- A Bird of Passage (London: Sampson Low, 1886, 3 vol.) ISBN 9780267204373
- Diana Barrington: A Romance of Central India (London: Ward and Downey, 1888, 3 vol.) ISBN 978-1240883219
- Two Masters: A Novel (London: F V White, 1890, 3 vol.) ISBN 9783337996178
- Interference: A Novel (London: F V White, 1891, 3 vol.) ISBN 9781250243621
- A Family Likeness: A Sketch in the Himalayas (London: Chatto and Windus, 1892, 3 vol.) ISBN 9781358663383
- A Third Person: A Novel (London: F V White, 1893, 2 vol.) ISBN 9780243980765
- Mr Jervis (London: Chatto and Windus, 1894, 3 vol.) ISBN 9780483751026
- Married or Single? (London: Chatto and Windus, 1895, 3 vol.) ISBN 9780803271920
- The Real Lady Hilda: A Sketch (London: Chatto and Windus, 1896, 1 vol.) ISBN 9783368926151
- Beyond the Pale (London: Chatto and Windus, 1897, 1 vol.) ISBN 9781502801708
- Miss Balmaine's Past (London: Chatto and Windus, 1898, 1 vol.) ISBN 9780332852911
- Peggy of the Bartons (London: Methuen, 1898, 1 vol.) ISBN 9780483896734
- Infatuation (London: Chatto & Windus, 1899) ISBN 9781356025459
- Terence (London: Chatto and Windus, 1899, 1 vol.) ISBN 9780526042005
- Angel: A Sketch in Indian Ink (London: Methuen, 1901, 1 vol.) ISBN 9780332979441
- The Cat's Paw (London: Chatto & Windus, 1902) ISBN 9781342239457
- Johanna (London: Methuen & Co., 1903) ISBN 9781022790667
- The Happy Valley (London: Methuen & Co., 1904) ISBN 978-1346382227
- Her Own People (London: Hurst & Blackett, 1905) ISBN 9780364901366
- A Nine Days' Wonder (London: Methuen & Co., 1905) ISBN 9780243251117
- The Youngest Miss Mowbray (London: Hurst & Blackett, 1906) ISBN 978-0855941499
- The Company's Servant: A Romance of Southern India (London: Hurst & Blackett, 1907) ISBN 9780483762862
- The Spanish Necklace (London: Chatto & Windus, 1907) ISBN 9780259376873
- Katherine the Arrogant (London: Methuen & Co., 1909) ISBN 9781494161590
- Babes in the Wood (London: Methuen & Co., 1910) ISBN 9780385549073
- Fame (London: Mills and Boon, 1910)
- A Rolling Stone (London: F. V. White & Co., 1911) ISBN 9780332045764
- The Serpent's Tooth (London: Hutchinson & Co., 1912) ISBN 9781359457721
- In Old Madras (London: Hutchinson & Co., 1913) ISBN 9788171679379
- Lismoyle (London: Hutchinson & Co., 1914 ISBN 9781434467294
- Quicksands (London: Cassell and Company, 1915) ISBN 9783368930677
- Given in Marriage (London: Hutchinson & Co., 1916) ISBN 9781341150791
- The Road to Mandalay. A Tale of Burma (London: Cassell & Co., 1917) ISBN 9781016133753
- A Rash Experiment (London: Hutchinson & Co., 1917)
- Bridget (London: Hutchinson & Co., 1918)
- The Pagoda Tree (London: Cassell & Co., 1919)
- Blue China (London: Hutchinson & Co., 1919)
- The Chaperon (London: Cassell & Co., 1920)
- The House of Rest (London: Cassell & Co., 1921)

=== Short story collections ===
- To Let, etc. (London: Chatto and Windus, 1893) ISBN 978-1279768051
- Village Tales and Jungle Tragedies, etc. (London: Chatto and Windus, 1895) ISBN 9781241210045
  - reprinted as Jungle Tales (London: Chatto and Windus, 1913) ISBN 9783988830487
- In the Kingdom of Kerry and Other Stories (London: Chatto and Windus, 1896) ISBN 9780259313069
- Jason and Other Stories (London: Chatto and Windus, 1899)
- A State Secret and Other Stories (London: Methuen, 1901) ISBN 9780243179879
- The Old Cantonment, with Other Stories of India and Elsewhere (London: Methuen & Co., 1905)
- Odds and Ends (London: Hutchinson & Co., 1919) ISBN 9781601122728
- The Dread of Night. Supernatural Encounters from the British Raj. Stories by Bithia Mary Croker and Alice Perrin (India: Speaking Tiger, 2023) ISBN 978-9354475665

== Analysis ==
An in-depth and detailed study of her novels, with special reference to her depiction of India, has been carried out by Dr Shashidhar G. Vaidya, under the supervision of Dr B. S. Naikar, former professor and chairman, Department of Studies in English, at Karnatak University.

A discussion of the cultural context of Croker's fiction, together with close readings of several of her novels and stories, can be found in John Wilson Foster, Irish Novels 1890–1940: New Bearings in Culture and Fiction (Oxford, UK: OUP, 2008). Some present-day scholars have seen in Croker's work examples of a "conjoining of gender and colonialism".
