= Unisex =

Things that are suitable for any gender

Unisex is an adjective indicating something is not sex-specific, i.e. is suitable for any type of sex. The term can also mean sex blindness or gender neutral.

The term 'unisex' was coined in the 1960s and was used fairly informally. The combining prefix uni- is from Latin unus, meaning one or single. However, 'unisex' seems to have been influenced by words such as united and universal, in which uni- takes the related sense shared. Unisex then means shared by sexes.

== Examples ==
Hair stylists and beauty salons that serve all genders are often referred to as unisex. This is also typical of other services and products that traditionally separated by sex, such as clothing shops or beauty products had traditionally separated.

Public toilets are commonly sex segregated, but if that is not the case, they are referred to as unisex public toilets.

Unisex clothing includes garments like T-shirts; versions of other garments may be tailored for the different fits depending on one's sex, such as jeans.

The sharing of a pool or recreational facility by swimmers and others of various sexes is commonly referred to as mixed bathing. When a school admits students of various sexes, it may be called coeducational or a mixed-sex school.

== Unisex gender-neutral style ==
Unisex fashion first appeared in the 1960s. People of all ages were copying the style of popular musicians or pop culture. The uniforms in Star Trek were androgynous, neither feminine nor masculine. At the time, "unisex" primarily meant girls and women had more masculine clothing, while having men's clothing be feminine was not prevalent.

=== Historical development ===
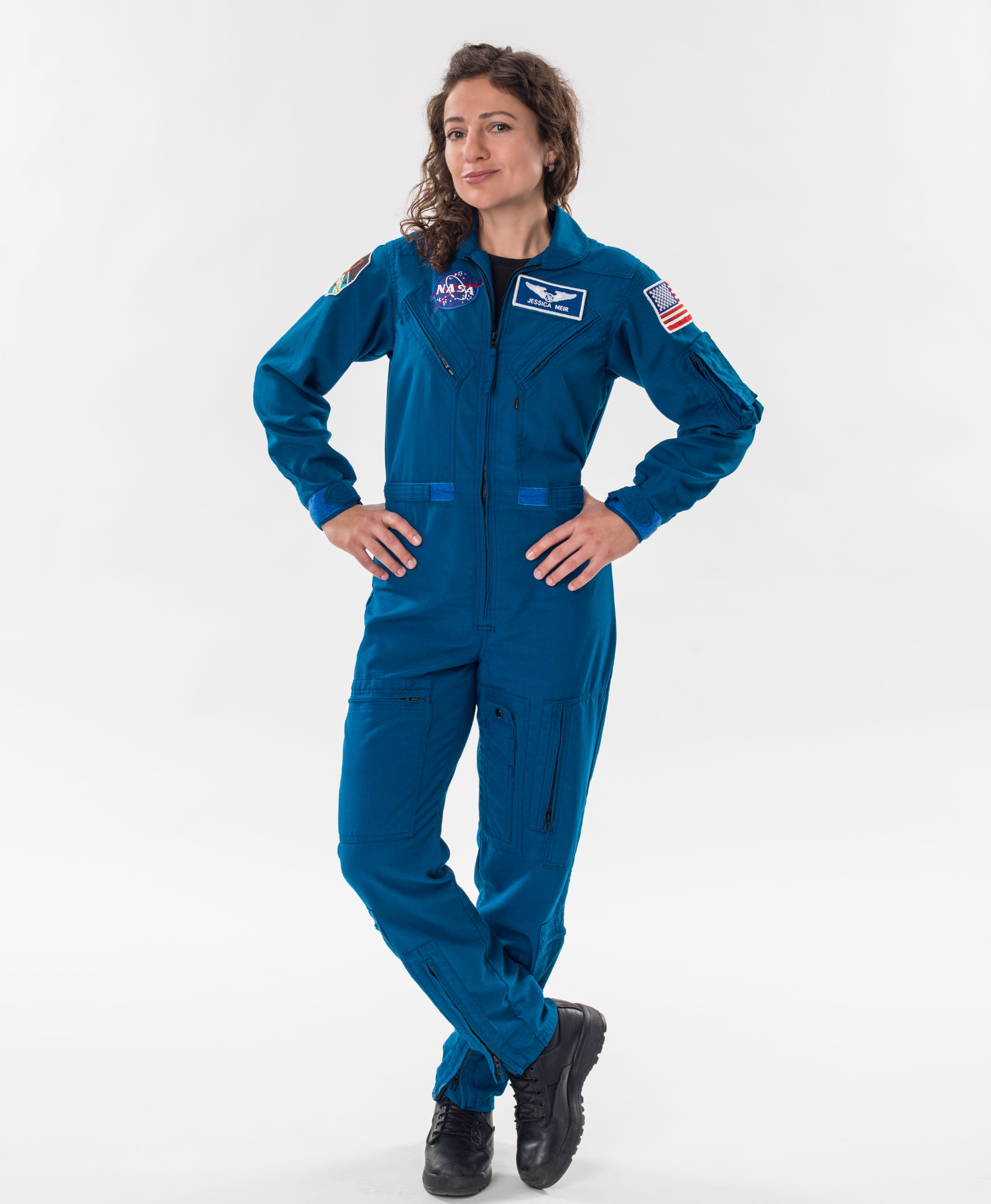
A woman wearing a jumpsuit; modernized "tuta"

In 1968, there was a unisex movement that ended as briefly as it came up. The theme of "Space Age" with simple graphic patterns and synthetic fabrics were prominent as the trend started on Paris runways. Pierre Cardin, Andre Courreges, and Paco Rabanne were the brains behind designing the "Space Age" theme for clothing. These clothes had no gender associations in history.

At the beginning of the Industrial Revolution, the removal of femininity led to women's clothing becoming more comfortable, and men's clothing becoming more homogeneous. An example of this is the Tuta, a universal one-piece suit created in 1919 that anybody could wear regardless of gender.

=== Concept of unisex ===
During 1968, children dealt with the wave of the trend where girls wore pants, boys had long hair, and everyone wore ponchos. This trend ended quickly as the word "unisex" turned into jargon. It was not until the 1980s that the neutrality of children's clothing sorted out to be healthier. Unisex clothing that attempted to reduce gender difference had turned to become the main reason behind it.

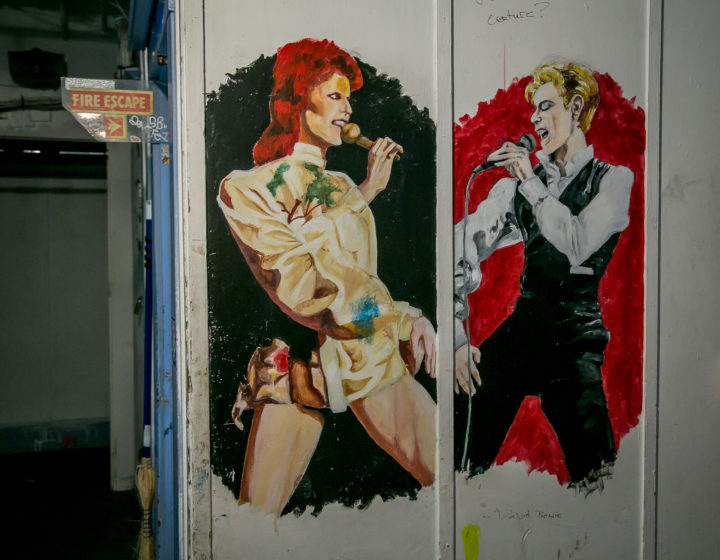
A mural of David Bowie's looks during different eras in his career

Sexlessness is also a form of expression for the concept of gender ambiguity. One example is English singer David Bowie who introduced the style of glam rock into the world with his signature look. Bowie’s signature looks respectively include:

- A spikey mullet
- A chic jumpsuit to highlight his frame
- Accentuating fur, feathers, and leather

=== Cosmetics and grooming ===
Unisex fashion is a style of wearing clothing that does not factor in gender. Any and every clothing is technically unisex by that logic. Unisex is more of a culture in that people typically follow the social standards set by their gender. Clothing is also assigned a gender based on social constructs around femininity and masculinity, which can be seen in how they are marketed.

=== Social constructs around unisex ===
One example of social constructs around clothing is how cosmetics such as heels, dresses, and jewels are associated with femininity. Jewelry, generally associated with femininity, is now commonly worn by men in the present. Removing the gender from an item can be rather difficult; it would be the same scale as changing history. Unisex clothing changes this.

Gender labels hugely affect gender differentiation (i.e., white tank tops, fitting rooms, other gender-specific items and spaces). An attached gender label or shopping section would draw in particular groups. A unisex label would remove this bias and "allow" anyone from any gender to purchase the respective cosmetic.

Barbershops were the first to be affected by the wave of unisex fashion trending in the 1970s: the opening of unisex salons. Today, unisex salons compete with barbershops for services such as male grooming, manicures, antiaging treatments, and "manscaping" (also known as body hair removal).

== Unisex clothing and school uniform policies ==
=== Unisex apparel ===
Unisex apparel became popular and in the 21st century is a more common concept than before, challenging the traditional gender-based clothing dress codes. Scholars note that garments that are traditionally associated with men have become more commonly worn by women, while clothing that is traditionally associated with women is less commonly adopted by men. These trends may reflect broader societal norms about gender, which may affect what is seen as acceptable attire for individuals based on their perceived or assigned gender. Unisex apparel is primarily a merge of men's and women's fashion, which is often described as concentrating on the individual's freedom and comfort. Scholars have noted that most of the credit for unisex apparel adoption goes to celebrities and fashion brands through social media platforms. The media images of unisex designs in online retail has contributed to shifting social norms around traditional clothing and has been discussed in relation to gender identity and expression.

=== School uniform policies ===
School uniform standards typically separate clothing requirements based on students' assigned sex at birth. Some examples that schools usually offer are trousers for boys and skirts for girls. Research examined how these uniform policies affect students whose gender identity or expression does not align with their uniform categories. For example, an Australian study reported that students with gender nonconforming identities have experienced discomfort in their school environment.

=== Impact on physical activity ===
School uniform policies have also been studied in relation to student physical activity. A national study of over one-million students from 135 counties investigated associations between school uniform requirements and gender differences in meeting recommended physical activity guidelines. In some high-income countries, uniform policy regions may have the effect that the gap between male and female students in physical activity is significant. However, these differences may result from different factors in the design of clothing, such as skirts or formal attire that may limit movement or the perception of whether that particular activity is more "suitable" for a certain gender. The study suggests that uniform policies may have an impact on the activity patterns, though results may vary.

=== Gender-inclusive and unisex uniform policy ===
Gender-inclusive or unisex uniform policies allow students to select clothing options without the distinctions based on the assigned sex or gender identity. Such policies have been proposed to provide all students with fair and equitable options that support comfort and participation while accommodating diverse gender identities. These can include shorts, skirts, and trousers for all students.

A study that was conducted in India’s educational institutions looked at the impact of implementing gender-neutral clothing policies on students aged 16–20. The study found that the participants surveyed prioritized comfort and supported inclusive attire options, with ninety-one percent of students who were surveyed agreeing with the idea of gender-neutral clothing. The findings may be pointing towards gender-neutral clothing policy that may support the perceptions of fairness and reduce gender-based limitations. The researchers suggest that gender-neutral clothing policies can influence both social and psychological aspects of the school environment, which may provide students with more flexible clothing choices and potentially support their health.

== See also ==
- Androgyny
- Mixed-sex education
- Mixed bathing
- Unisex name
- Unisex public toilet
- Gender role
- Gender mainstreaming
- Unisex salon
