= Roger Poidatz =

French writer

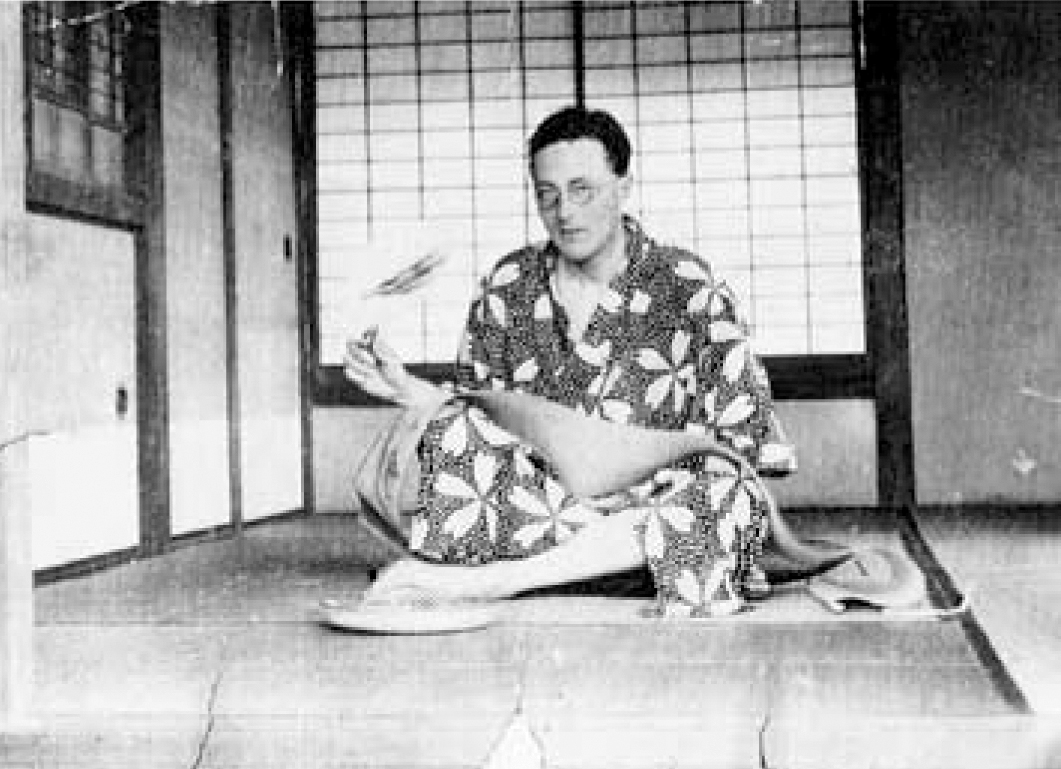
Roger Poidatz au Japon

Roger Poidatz (1894 – 14 August 1976) was a French writer best known by his pseudonym, Thomas Raucat.

Roger Poidatz was born in Paris and graduated from the Paris École Polytechnique, subsequently becoming a pilot in the French Air Force during World War I, flying reconnaissance aircraft. After the war, he was sent to Japan (a WWI ally) to assist in the education of local pilots.

His mission completed, Poidatz returned to Europe via China and India. During the return voyage, he revised and finished his first novel, L'honorable partie de campagne (1924, translated into English by Leonard Cline as "The Honorable Picnic"), a stylised travelogue account of his experiences and observations in Japan. Poidatz signed the book "Thomas Raucat", a French phonetical approximation of the Japanese phrase Tomarō ka ("Shall I stay overnight?").

L'honorable partie de campagne met with critical and commercial success, but Poidatz would publish only one more book, a collection of short stories that originally appeared in various French magazines published in 1927 as De Shang-Haï à Canton ("From Shanghai to Canton") and re-issued in an enlarged edition in 1928 as Loin des blondes ("Far from the Blondes").

Two of Raucat's Loin des blondes short stories were translated into Dutch by Dutch writer J. Slauerhoff and published in magazines in 1929; they were subsequently published as Twee verhalen ("Two Stories") in 1974.

== Works ==
- L'honorable partie de campagne (1924, latest reprint 2004) ISBN 2-07-077089-3
- De Shang-Haï à Canton (1927, re-issued in 1928 as Loin des blondes)

== Sources ==
- Biographical notice in Le Livre de Poche edition of L'honorable partie de campagne
- Wikipedia article on J. Slauerhoff
