= Unisex clothing =

Clothing that is suitable for both men and women

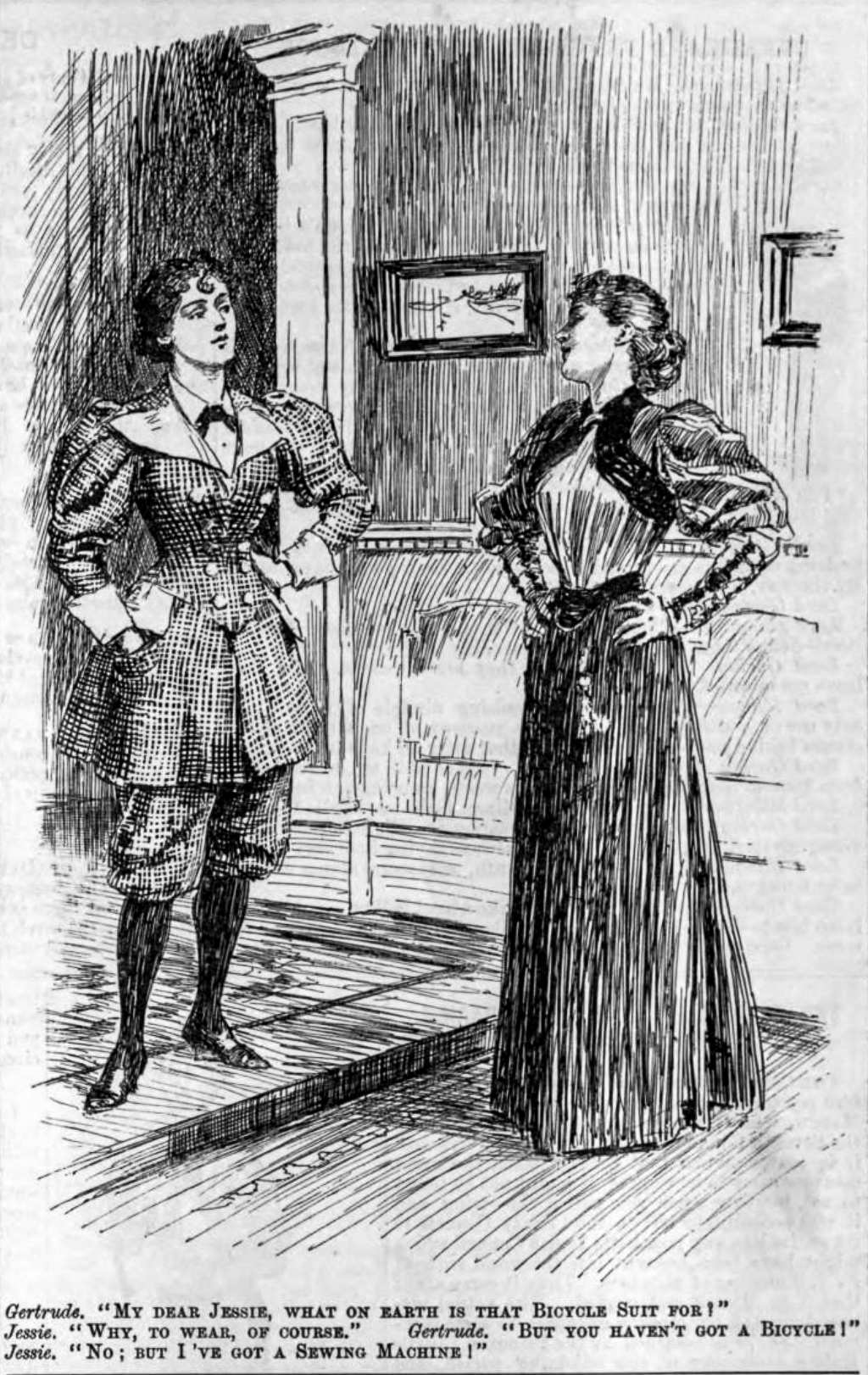
"The Bicycle Suit", caricature from Punch magazine (1895)

Unisex clothing is best described as clothing designed to be suitable for both sexes in order to make men and women look similar. The term unisex was first used in 1968 in Life, an American magazine that ran weekly from 1883 to 1972. The development of unisex clothing spans from early milestones like Victorian dress reform, bicycling bloomers, and the 1960s unisex trend to modern everyday staples like shirts and pants. This evolution also includes contemporary retail and museum initiatives, such as Selfridges' Agender pop-up and the Museum at FIT's His & Hers exhibition, as well as breakthroughs in haute couture like Rad Hourani's first unisex couture collection.

== History ==
Although the first use of "unisex" as a term dates from the 1960s, it can be argued that "unisex clothing" its first appearance dates from the late nineteenth century, as part of the "Victorian dress reform". Many scholars argue that nineteenth century fashionable clothing, which originated in France, reflected the dominance of traditional feminine roles. John Berger his famous statement 'men act, women appear' can be useful to further discuss the appearance of "unisex clothing". Berger claims that, in Western European cultures, the role of men is considered active and that of women is considered passive or, to put it differently, men observe women and women are observed by men. This asymmetry in the relationship between men and women was visualized in dress in the nineteenth century: women were more and more prescribed to fashionable clothing, clothing that disabled them from being active due to, for example, crinoline dresses that were very heavy, whereas men had the ability to be active due to their sober and simple clothing.

An attempt to develop alternative feminine roles by the use of alternative clothing behavior started in England and the United States. For example, members of the women's movement deplored the use of corsets and sets of ponderous garments and centred their proposals of dress reform on the adoption of trousers. However, they were unable to win the support of many women outside of their own group due to the basic premise of nineteenth-century ideology concerning women's roles in which "the belief in fixed gender identities and enormous differences – physical, psychological, and intellectual – between men and women" was at the centre. One example of this was the organized "Symposium on Dress" in which three designs, that included either a divided skirt or trousers, were presented. These dress reform proposals were, at that time, very controversial and seen as too radical by the middle-class women, therefore, leaning more towards alienation than involvement of this potential group of supporters of the women's rights movement.

A more fruitful account of the recognition of non-conformist costume or dress of that time lies in the history of "alternative dress". The alternative dress style can be described as a "set of signs, borrowed from male clothing, that appeared sometimes singly, sometimes in combination with one another, but always associated with items of female clothing." This alternative dress is a form of non-verbal communication and is different from the "Victorian dress reform" (as mentioned above), being a form of verbal communication. Bicycling, for example, was a late nineteenth-century sport that was not identified as a male activity. Women, therefore, were able to wear divided skirts and knee-length bloomers without having difficulties considering gender roles because this "alternative dress" did not intend to undermine patriarchy. After a while, this and many other alternative dress examples, such as uniforms, became more effective in conveying a message than that of dress reformers, because alternative dress had more "followers" in everyday life. The bicycle, therefore, can be seen as 'one of the symbols of emancipation' that has changed the attitude towards women's sports apparel.

In the 1887 novella The Republic of the Future, American writer Anna Bowman Dodd depicted a future New York in which "men and women dress alike". A conservative, Dodd regarded that as a negative development, one of the features making the future she described into a dystopia

Eventually, the 1960s can be considered the decade in which "unisex" and "unisex clothing" became widely spread. The "unisex" trend arose in response to the youth revolution and the hippie movement of the 1960s and the women's liberation movement of the early 1970s. However, this trend can be considered a more recent form of the aforementioned fashionable clothing, because it confirms a traditional feminine role subservient to the masculine role given the fact that "unisex clothing", mostly, represents women wearing (altered) men's clothing.

== Contemporary wear ==
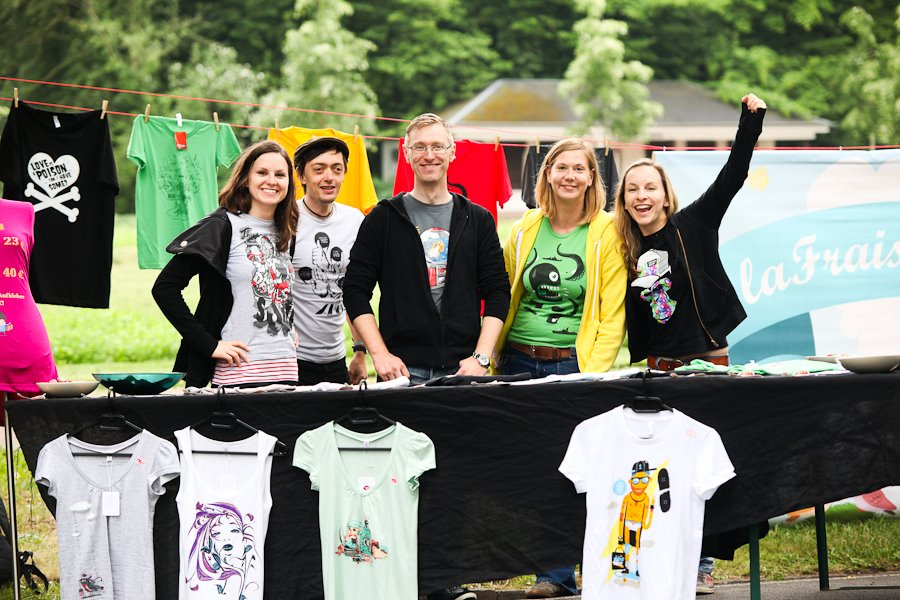
People wearing T-shirts, which are considered unisex in modern culture.

Today, a common mode of unisex clothing may be an outfit made up of a shirt, pants, or both, as these articles are considered appropriate for either gender in western society. Both men and women wear shirts and pants on a regular basis in the western world and it has become quite a fashion favourite despite feminine style clothing maintaining a secure place in female fashion.

While many contemporary designers push against traditional gender norms, the fashion industry still largely divides collections into menswear and womenswear. The Museum at FIT's 2010–2011 exhibition His & Hers closed with pieces from labels like Burberry Prorsum, a label that creatively blurs the line between masculine and feminine dress.

In March 2015, the London department store Selfridges launched a gender-neutral shopping space spanning three floors of its Oxford Street flagship and extending onto its website. However, the initiative was only a temporary pop-up, which The Atlantic noted functioned more effectively as a marketing tool than as a true retail revolution.

== Haute Couture ==
Unisex clothing made its first entry in haute couture with Canadian designer Rad Hourani. Hourani's collection is the first one that is unisex by design.

== See also ==
- Androgyny in fashion
- Gender mainstreaming
- Gender role
- Unisex name
