= Alice Perrin =

British novelist

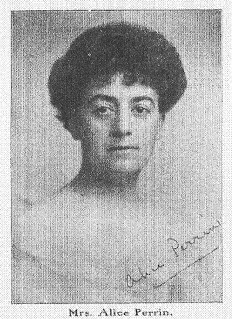
- in 1906
- Born: Alice Robinson; 15 July 1867; Mussoorie, North-Western Provinces, British Raj
- Died: 13 February 1934 (aged 66); Vaud, Switzerland
- Occupation: Writer
- Known for: Novels and ghost stories
- Spouse: Charles Perrin
- Children: 1

Alice Perrin or Alice Robinson (15 July 1867 – 13 February 1934) was a British novelist who wrote about the British in colonial India. She became successful after the publication of her short ghost story collection East of Suez.

== Life ==
Perrin was born in the hill station of Mussoorie in Anglo-India in 1867. Her parents were Bertha and her second husband John Innes Robinson. Her father would become a Major General in the Bengal Cavalry. and her great grandfather, Sir George Robinson, 1st Baronet had been a director of the East India Company. She was sent to England where she went to school and when she returned she married an engineer named Charles Perrin on 26 May 1886 in Dehra. Once married and after the birth of their only child she took to writing to relieve the boredom of life in India for a British woman. She published a short story titled Caulfield's Crime in the 1892 Belgravia Annual.

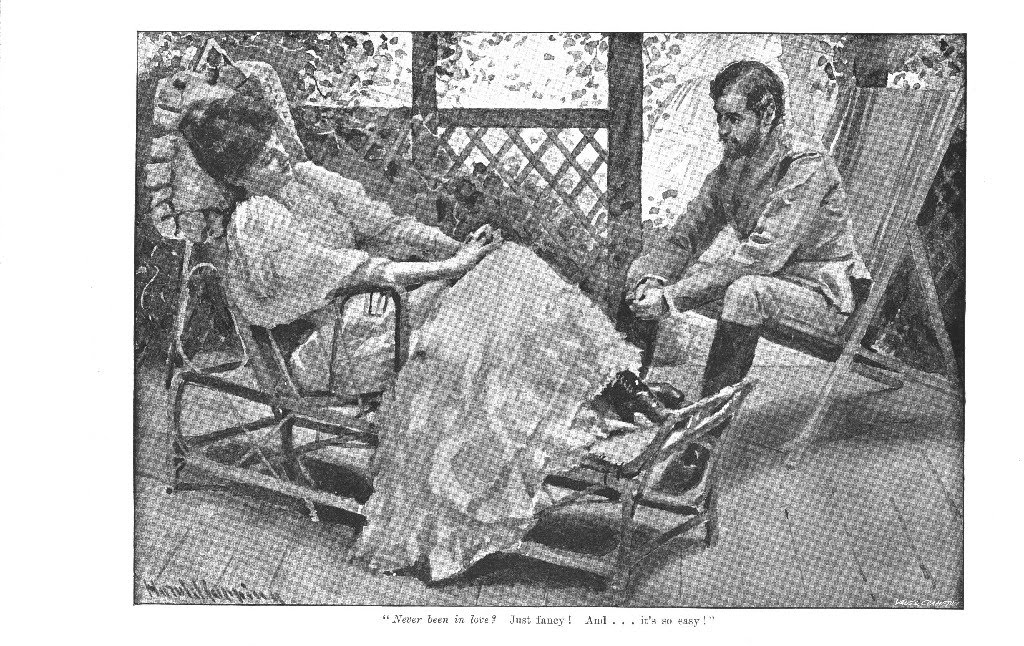
"Never Been in Love" illustration by Harold Copping for "Beynon of the Irrigation Department" (Windsor Magazine in 1896)

Her debut books were Into Temptation and Late in Life which were both two volume novels and published in 1894 and 1896. She would eventually publish seventeen novels.

Her writing became popular after the first of her collections of short ghost stories was published. East of Suez sold well and her writing was compared to Rudyard Kipling where in places Punch considered her writing better.

Perrin wrote about the missionaries in India and she was not enthusiastic about them. The History of British India considers three books significant on missionaries to India. These were The Old Missionary by William Wilson Hunter, The Hosts of the Lord (1900) by Flora Annie Steel and Perrin's 1909 book Idolatry.

Perrin and her husband moved to Switzerland in 1925 and three years later her only child died in London. She died in Vaud in 1934.

== Selected works ==
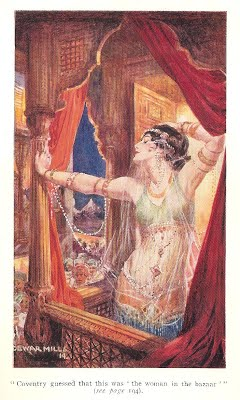
Woman in bazaar - illustrated by J Dewar Mills in 1914

- Into Temptation (1894)
- Late in Life (1896)
- East of Suez (1901) - anthology of short stories
- The Spell of the Jungle (1902)
- Idolatory (1909)
- The Anglo-Indians (1912)
- The Happy Hunting Ground (1914)
- Woman in Bazaar (1914)
- Star of India (1919)
- Government House (1925)
- Rough Passages (1926), collection of 10 short stories
