= William Jones (novel) =

1944 novel by T. Rowland Hughes

- 1945 edition
- Author: T. Rowland Hughes
- Translator: Richard Ruck (Gwasg Aberystwyth edition, 1953)
- Language: Welsh
- Genre: Novel
- Publisher: Gwasg Aberystwyth
- Publication date: 1944
- Publication place: Wales
- Media type: Print (Hardback & Paperback)
- Pages: 268 pages

William Jones is a novel by T. Rowland Hughes, written in 1944. It tells of the story of a quarryman in Gwynedd who decides to leave his community to look for work in the coal mines of South Wales. It describes the tough lives of the quarrymen at the beginning of the twentieth century.

A quote from the book, ”Cadw dy blydi chips!” (Welsh for "Keep your bloody chips!"), is the first time that a swear word appeared in modern Welsh literature.
