= Chwalfa =

1967 edition (publ. Gwasg Aberystwyth)

Chwalfa is a Welsh language novel written by T. Rowland Hughes in 1946.

The novel chronicles the history of the Ifans family in the imaginary quarry town of Llechfaen. However, the story is based on the real events in Bethesda, Gwynedd, at the time of the 'Great Strike' at Penrhyn Quarry between 1900 and 1903.

== Adaptions ==
Chwalfa has been adapted for the stage and screen. In 2016, it was produced by Theatr Genedlaethol Cymru.

In the early 1960s, the BBC produced a television adaption of the novel.
