= T. Rowland Hughes =

Welsh novelist, dramatist and poet

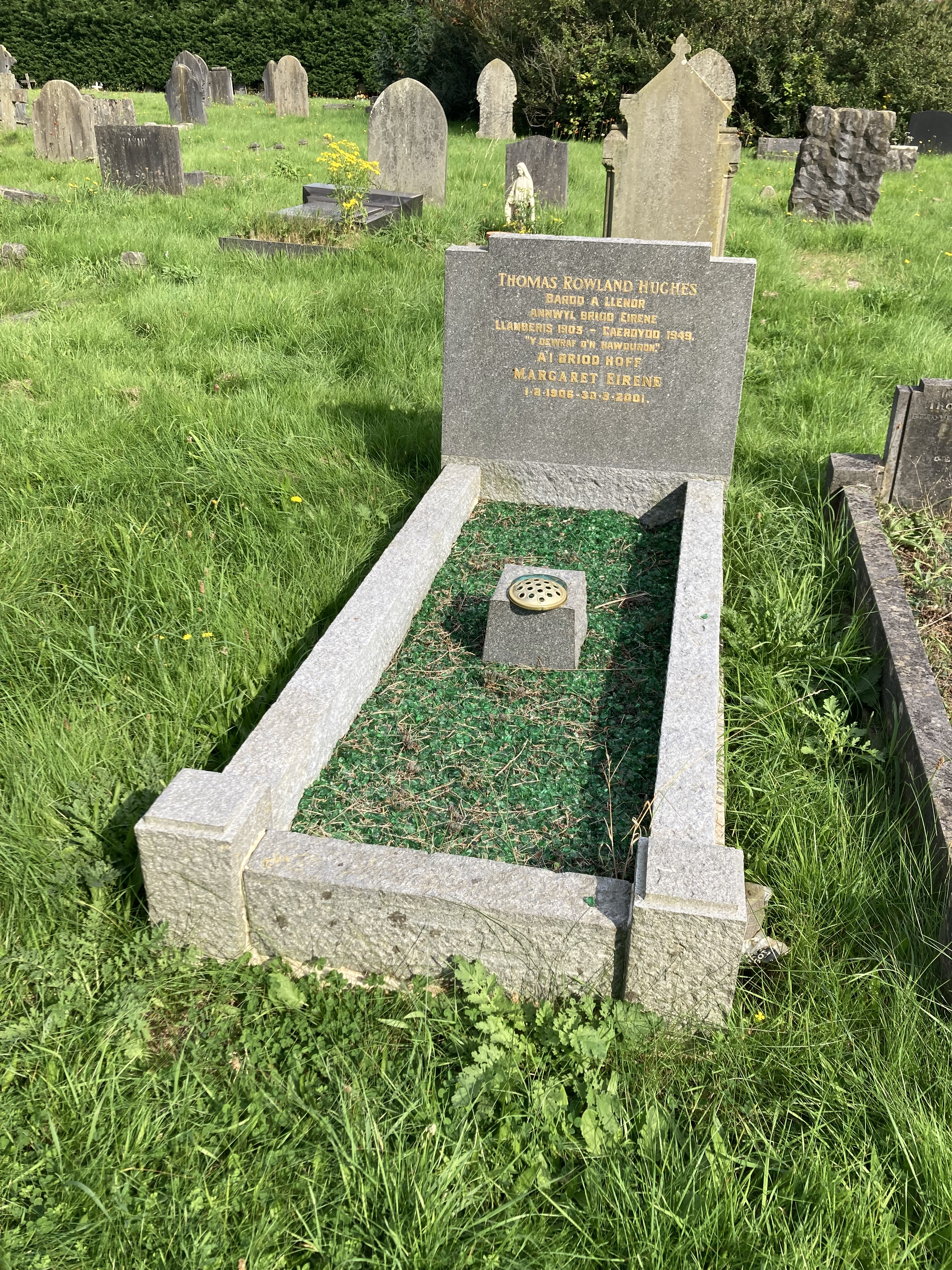
Grave of T. Rowland Hughes, Cathays Cemetery, Cardiff

Thomas Rowland Hughes (often referred to as T. Rowland Hughes) (17 April 1903 – 24 October 1949), was a Welsh novelist, broadcaster, dramatist and poet. He was the son of a quarryman from Llanberis, Caernarfonshire (Gwynedd today), in north Wales. He is primarily renowned in the present day for his novels about characters living and working in the slate quarries of north Wales, but in his day he was just as well known as a poet and broadcaster. William Jones and Chwalfa are his most famous novels.

== His life ==
Hughes was born on 17 April 1903, in Llanberis, Caernarfonshire, the son of May and William Hughes. He was educated at Dolbadarn primary school, Ysgol Brynrefail, and the University College, Bangor, where he graduated in 1925 with first class honours in English and Welsh. In 1928, he was awarded a scholarship by the University of Wales to study at Jesus College, Oxford, leading to a B.Litt. degree in 1931 on The London Magazine from 1820 to 1829.

He was a teacher at the county school for boys in Aberdare from 1926 to 1928. He was lecturer in English and Welsh at Coleg Harlech, 1930–1933. In the summer of 1934 he was appointed Principal of the Mary Ward Settlement, London.

From 1935 to 1945, Hughes was a producer of feature programmes for the BBC in Cardiff. In this time, he produced and/or wrote some 300 radio programmes on the BBC. He produced, and often co-scripted with, a number of Welsh writers, including Jack Jones, Kate Roberts, Saunders Lewis, Eiluned Lewis, Eynon Evans, J. O. Francis, Richard Llewellyn, Gwyn Jones, Emlyn Williams and Philip Burton. Of these, his principal collaborators, in both production and writing, were Jack Jones and Philip Burton, who succeeded him at the BBC in 1945. Hughes's outstanding productions are considered to be The Proud Valley (1940), the radio premiere of the Paul Robeson film; How Green Was My Valley (1942); and Welsh Lidice (1943). After just five years in the job, he was described by The Guardian as one of the best producers working in British radio.

Hughes won the Chair at the National Eisteddfod on two occasions, in 1937 for his ode 'Y Ffin' ('The Boundary'), and again in 1940 for 'Pererinion' ('Pilgrims').

He married Eirene Williams in 1933. Not long after, he was diagnosed with multiple sclerosis, and it was at this time that he began to write his most well-known works.

== Bibliography ==
=== Poetry ===
- "Tydi a roddaist" ('Thou Who Gavest', set to music by Arwel Hughes in 1938).

Lyrics in Welsh

Tydi a roddaist liw i'r wawr
A lliw i'r machlud mwyn,
Tydi a luniaist gerdd a sawr
A'r gwanwyn yn y llwyn,
O cadw ni rhag colli'r hud
Sydd heddiw'n crwydro drwy'r holl fyd.

Tydi a luniaist gân i'r nant
A si i'r goedwig werdd,
Tydi a roist i'r awel dant
Ac i'r ehedydd gerdd,
O cadw ni rhag dyfod dydd
Na yrr ein calon gân yn rhydd.

Tydi a glywaist lithriad traed
Ar ffordd Galfari gynt,
Tydi a welaist ddafnau gwaed
Y gŵr ar ddieithr hynt.
O cadw ni rhag dyfod oes
Heb goron ddrain, na chur, na chroes.

- Cân neu ddwy ("A Song or Two", 1948)

=== Novels ===
- O Law i Law ('From Hand to Hand', 1943)
- William Jones (1944)
- Yr Ogof ('The Cave', 1945)
- Chwalfa ('Upheaval', 1946)
- Y Cychwyn ('The Beginning', 1947)

=== Plays ===
- Y Ffordd ('The Way', 1945)

=== For children ===
- Storïau Mawr y Byd ('Great Stories of the World', 1936)

== Criticism and memoirs ==
- Memoir by Edward Rees (1968)
- John Rowlands, T. Rowland Hughes (Writers of Wales series, Cardiff, 1975)
- Philip Burton (1969) Early Doors: My Life and the Theatre, Dial Press, chapters 3 and 5.
- D. N. Thomas, (2020) Under Milk Wood: A Play for Ears. Some reflections on T. Rowland Hughes, Philip Burton and Dylan Thomas, in the New Welsh Review, May, and published online at https://sites.google.com/site/dylanthomasandnewquay/under-milk-wood-a-play-for-ears
