= Flora Annie Steel =

English writer on India (1847–1929)

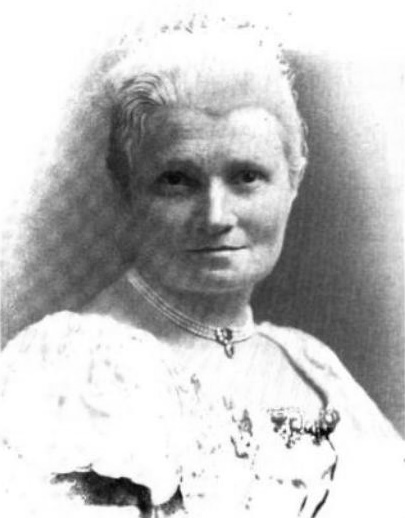
- Flora Annie Steel, c. 1903
- Born: 2 April 1847; Sudbury, Middlesex, England
- Died: 12 April 1929 (aged 82); Minchinhampton, Gloucestershire, England
- Occupation: Writer
- Writing career
- Period: 19th century
- Genres: History, Fiction, Children's Literature

Flora Annie Steel (2 April 1847 – 12 April 1929) was a writer who lived in British India for 22 years. She was noted especially for books set in the Indian subcontinent or connected with it. Her novel On the Face of the Waters (1896) describes incidents in the Indian Mutiny.

== Personal life ==
She was born Flora Annie Webster at Sudbury Priory, Sudbury, Middlesex, the third child of George Webster. Her mother, Isabella MacCallum, was an heiress. In 1867 she married Henry William Steel, a member of the Indian Civil Service, and they lived in India until 1889, chiefly in the Punjab, with which most of her books are connected. She grew deeply interested in native Indian life and began to urge educational reforms on the government of India. Mrs Steel herself became an Inspectress of Government and Aided Schools in the Punjab and also worked with John Lockwood Kipling, Rudyard Kipling's father, fostering Indian cooking. When her husband's health was weak, Flora Annie Steel took over some of his responsibilities.

She died at her daughter's house in Minchinhampton, Gloucestershire on 12 April 1929. Her biographers include Violet Powell and Daya Patwardhan.

== Writing ==
Flora was interested in relating to all classes of Indian society. The birth of her daughter gave her a chance to interact with local women and learn their language. She encouraged the production of local handicrafts and collected folk-tales, a collection of which she published in 1894.

Her interest in schools and the education of women gave her insight into native life and character. A year before leaving India, she co-authored and published The Complete Indian Housekeeper and Cook, which gave detailed directions to European women on all aspects of household management in India.

In 1889 the family moved back to Britain, and she continued her writing there. Some of her best work, according to the 1911 Encyclopædia Britannica, is contained in two collections of her short stories, From the Five Rivers and Tales of the Punjab.

She also wrote a popular history of India. John F. Riddick describes Steel's The Hosts of the Lord as one of the "three significant works" produced by Anglo-Indian writers on Indian missionaries, along with The Old Missionary (1895) by William Wilson Hunter and Idolatry (1909) by Alice Perrin. Among her other literary associates in India was Bithia Mary Croker.

== Bibliography ==
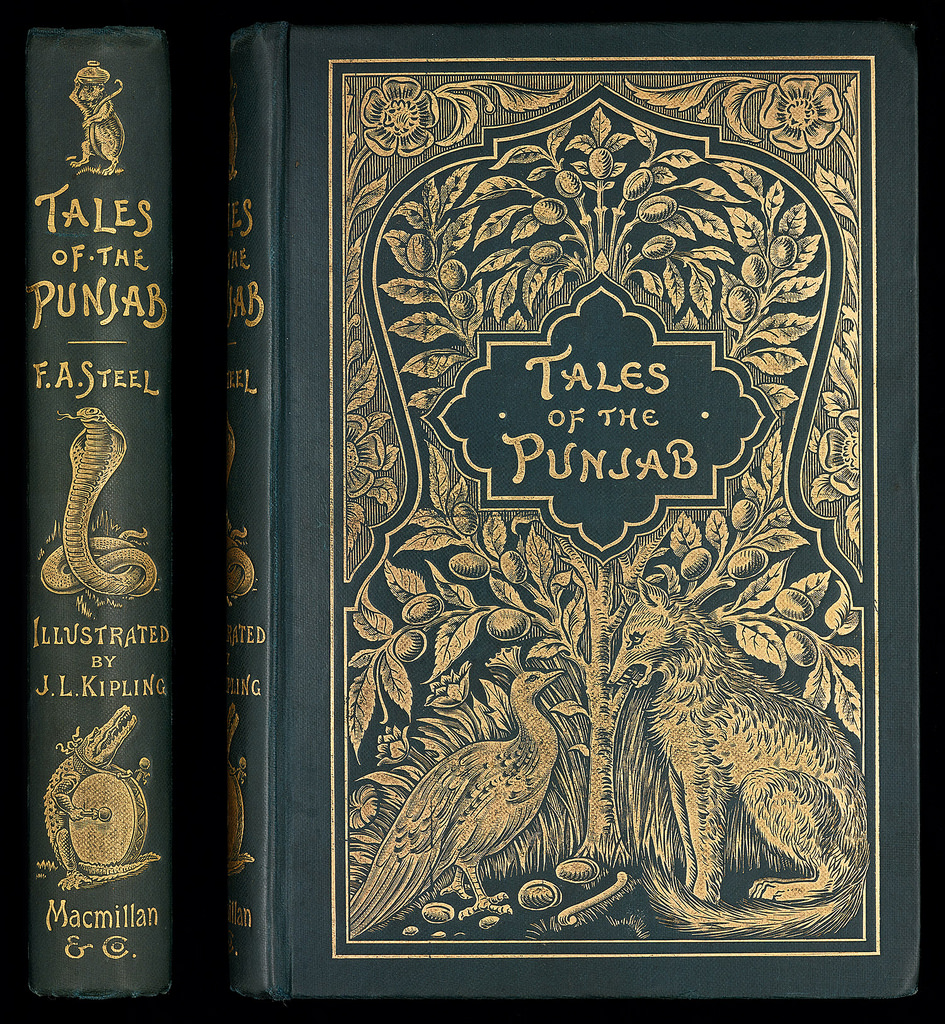
Tales of the Punjab (1894), illustrated by John Lockwood Kipling

- Wide Awake Stories (1884)
- From the Five Rivers (1893)
- Miss Stuart's Legacy (1893)
- Tales of the Punjab (1894)
- The Flower of Forgiveness (1894)
- The Potter's Thumb (1894)
- Red Rowans (1895)
- On the Face of the Waters (1896)
- In the Permanent Way, and Other Stories (1897)
- In the Tideway (1897)
- The Complete Indian Housekeeper and Cook (1888)
- The Hosts of the Lord (1900)
- Voices in the Night (1900)
- In the Guardianship of God (1903)
- A Book of Mortals (1905)
- India (1905)
- A Sovereign Remedy (1906)
- A Prince of Dreamers (1908)
- India through the ages; a popular and picturesque history of Hindustan (1908)
- King-Errant (1912)
- The Adventures of Akbar (1913)
- The Mercy of the Lord (1914)
- Marmaduke (1917)
- Mistress of Men (1918)
- English Fairy Tales (1918)
- A Tale of Indian Heroes (1923)
- "Lâl"
- A Cookery Book
- Late Tales
- The Curse of Eve
- The Gift of the Gods
- The Law of the Threshold
- The Woman Question
- The Garden Of Fidelity: Being The Autobiography Of Flora Annie Steel 1847–1929
