= On the Face of the Waters =

1896 novel by Flora Annie Steel

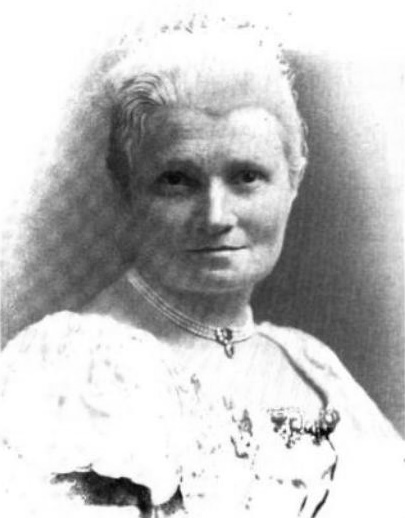
- Author: Flora Annie Steel
- Language: English
- Publisher: London : Heinemann
- Publication date: 1896
- Publication place: United Kingdom
- Media type: Print

On the Face of the Waters is a novel by English author Flora Annie Steel. It was first published in 1897 when it was hailed by critics as one of the best novels dealing with the Indian Rebellion of 1857. It is divided into five books of six chapters each (except Book II which has seven).

The novel is based heavily on research that Flora Annie Steel conducted in India, to the extent that Steel often provided the accurate hour, date, and weather of important historical events that interweave through the plot and characters of the novel. She was able to secure access from government officials to previously confidential records about the Indian Rebellion. She wrote in her autobiography that it was like “digging for gold, uncertain each instant if some priceless treasure would not turn up. And there was a breathless haste, an inevitable hurry about it, almost as if the spirit of the times had been caught and prisoned in the papers”.

== Plot introduction ==
On the Face of the Waters unfolds during the Indian Rebellion of 1857. The narrative shifts among three different points of view: the royal family of Delhi, the native Indian soldiers and their allies, and the English army that takes Delhi. The male protagonist, Jim Douglas, a former soldier, has been living with a former dancing girl Zora who he had "saved" months before and is now pregnant by him. Zora though soon dies, and Douglas is recruited to be a British spy.

The female protagonist, Kate Erlton, at the beginning of the novel, is living the normal life of a colonial wife of her husband Major Erlton. When the rebellion erupts, she is forced to confront the dangerous reality of being isolated in the middle of major colonial rebellion. She finds out that her husband has been having a public affair with Alice Gissing. And when rebels attack the house Kate is visiting, Jim Douglas rescues her, though Alice Gissing is murdered while attempting to rescue an English child. When Douglas can't safely return Kate to friendly territory, he moves her to the heart of the hostile city, setting up a fake household with her as they pose as a Muslim Afghani family. While there, Kate is left to spend most of her time alone on the rooftop, away from eyes while Jim goes out daily to scout the city while posing as a trader.

While being stuck behind the house's walls, Kate befriends Tara, her Indian maidservant, and adopts Indian customs and learns Hindustani. Major Erlton, still with the army, is mortally wounded in battle. As the rebellion ends, Kate finds out of her husband's death, and is allowed to start a new life with Jim.
