= The Dark Chamber =

The Dark Chamber is a 1927 horror novel by American writer Leonard Cline.

The novel concerns Oscar Fitzalan and his interactions with Richard Pride who, trying to remember his past life, goes beyond his own memory and sinks into the gulfs of "primal memory."

== Plot ==
The narrator, Oscar Fitzalan, a composer, is hired by Richard Pride to assist him at his estate and study at Mordance Hall. Here, he meets Hough, Pride's secretary; Miriam, Pride's wife; the Prides' daughter Janet; and their dog Tod, a German hound. They are later joined by Ramón Del Prado, one of Pride's employees. Also in the household are two black servants, old Mamie and her fourteen-year-old daughter Sally.

Pride brings Fitzalan to play music in order to awaken his memories. However, the household is devastated: Janet, Oscar's first love interest, elopes with Del Prado, and Pride's secretary, Hough, commits suicide. The dog becomes extremely aggressive. Pride's wife, Miriam, commits suicide as well.

In the end, Pride is reduced to a dirty and ruinous state from the memory therapy, and he finally leaves the house, letting the winds destroy his files regarding the recovered memories. He goes off into the night and there, when his daughter returns and elopes with the narrator, he is found dead, along with his dog in the woods - both having killed each other.

== Critical reception ==
The Dark Chamber was praised by H.P. Lovecraft as a masterpiece of weird literature in his essay Supernatural Horror in Literature. Clark Ashton Smith, in a February 1949 letter to August Derleth, praised The Dark Chamber, saying "it depicts with singular power the retrogression of a human being." It was also listed by horror critic R.S. Hadji in his list of "unjustly neglected" horror fiction, and described by Neil Barron as "an intriguing story, prefiguring Paddy Chayefsky's ALTERED STATES (1978)". Reviewing The Dark Chamber for Weird Tales, Scott Connors described Cline's treatment of his theme as "powerful" and stated that the "sheer pleasure of Cline’s style" was a reason to read the book. By contrast, E. F. Bleiler's view of the book was negative: "H. P. Lovecraft regarded the novel highly, but I must confess that I found it almost unreadable because of its lack of focus and very turgid writing."

== Influence ==
Lovecraft passed his copy of The Dark Chamber to several of his fellow writers, including Clark Ashton Smith, Donald Wandrei, Frank Belknap Long, and Henry S. Whitehead. All of these writers later wrote fiction about hereditary memory that were influenced by the novel.
