= The Complete Indian Housekeeper and Cook =

1888 book

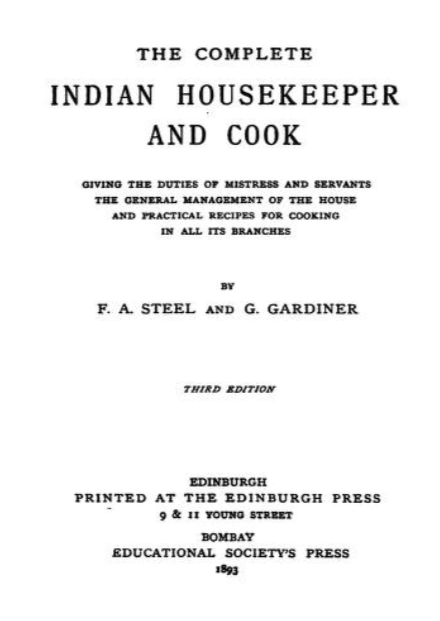
- Title page for The Complete Indian Housekeeper and Cook (1893, Third edition)
- Author: Flora Annie Steel and Grace Gardiner
- Language: English
- Subject: Housekeeping
- Genre: Manual
- Publisher: various
- Publication date: 1888
- Publication place: British India
- Pages: 300

The Complete Indian Housekeeper and Cook is a book on housekeeping during the British Raj. Flora Annie Steel and Grace Gardiner, each the wife of a British civil servant in India, published the first edition of the book in 1888 after having lived in India for some years. They revised and reprinted the book several times.

The book is significant in modern times as a historical record of daily home living among the British in India. Though it focuses on domestic tasks, it reveals much about British attitudes to India in the late nineteenth century. Steel and Gardiner's mission was to uphold Victorian standards in Indian kitchens, and in their advice for memsahibs explain how to "make hold" over their Indian servants.

== Editions ==
There are no known extant copies of the 1888 original first edition. The earliest version identifies is the 1890 version which bears an introductory note that it was published after a previous first edition. Heinemann Publishing published the fourth edition in 1898 and kept that edition in print until 1921.

== Public Response ==
One reviewer considered how the authors of the text were representatives of women in memsaab roles.

One reviewer noted that the book describes British authority in the way that they ruled.

Another reviewer described how the book gives insight to British national identity.

There are other reviews.
