= Leonard Cline =

American novelist

Leonard Lanson Cline (11 May 1893-15/16 January 1929) was an American novelist, poet, short story writer, and journalist.

== Biography ==
Born in the United States in Bay City, Michigan, he attended the University of Michigan, was married in 1913, published his first book of poetry, Poems, in 1914 and worked for The Detroit News from 1916 until 1922. In 1922 he began a job with the newspaper Baltimore Sun.

His writings were published in a variety of magazines: The New Republic, The American Mercury, The Smart Set, The Nation and Scribner's Magazine. His journalist work was published in The Baltimore Sun, the New York World, the Chicago Daily News, the New York Herald Tribune, and St. Louis Post-Dispatch.

Viking Press published his first novel, God Head, in 1925. It deals with the Kalevala legends in a modern society. The critic Laurence Stallings wrote: "It is the most tempestuous novel of many seasons. It would be eminently fair to believe that Leonard Cline could write rings around a half dozen of our ten best novelists."

In 1926 he published the humorous novel Listen, Moon!, which deals with a professor assuming the role of a pirate along the Chesapeake Bay. Time's reviewer wrote of it, "the commonplace has suddenly, with sublime and innocent vulgarity, comic pedantry, unflagging ebullience, gone stark, raving romantic.... The contrasting humor and whimsy of [Cline’s] new novel is as astonishing as it is joyous."

In 1927 he published The Dark Chamber, arguably his most famous work. The novel was described by H.P. Lovecraft in his Supernatural Horror in Literature as "extremely high in artistic stature". A review proclaimed, "he has opened a squamous dungeon of the mind and explored it with the erudite perversity of a cheerier, juicier Poe. Like all horror stories it is belittled by its own theatricality yet it remains an amazingly worded orgy of the more unspeakable human propensities."

He also published stories in pulp magazines using the pseudonym "Alan Forsyth". (Six of these stories are collected in The Lady of Frozen Death and Other Weird Tales, published in 1992).

Cline was also a translator, translating Thomas Raucat's The Honourable Picnic from the French. His translation of Ramón del Valle-Inclán's La Lampara Maravillosa (The Lamp of Marvels), a book of spiritual exercises, remains unpublished.

In 1927, during a drunken quarrel, Cline shot his friend Wilfred Irwin, who died of his wounds several hours later. Cline was tried and sentenced to a year in prison for manslaughter. He was released after eight months for good behavior. Henry Luce gave Cline a job at Time when he got out of prison. On the evening of 15 January 1929, Cline hosted a party at his New York City apartment to celebrate the sale of a scenario for a play. Cline complained to friends at the party about having chest pains. He was found dead of heart failure in his apartment five days later, not having been seen alive since the night of the party.
