= The Republic of the Future =

1887 novel by Anna Bowman Dodd

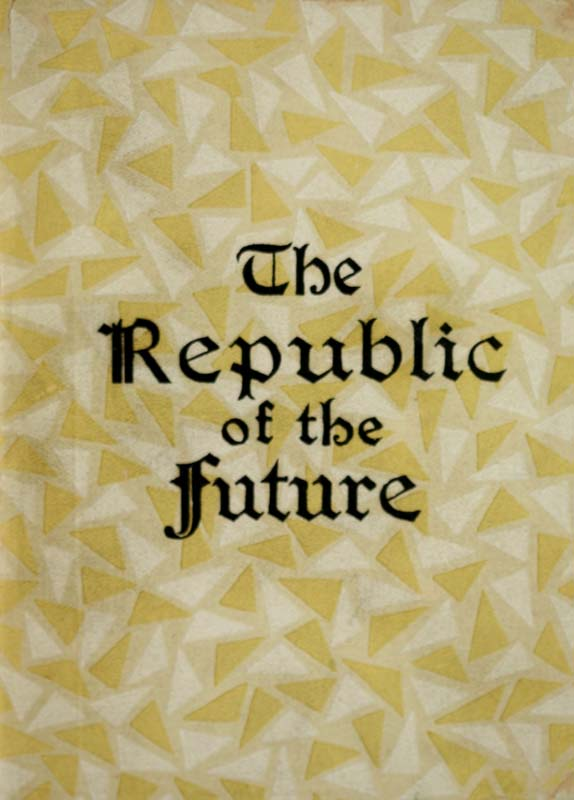
- Author: Anna Bowman Dodd
- Original title: The Republic of the Future: or, Socialism a Reality
- Language: English
- Genre: Dystopia; Science fiction
- Publisher: Cassell & Co.
- Publication date: 1887
- Publication place: United States
- Media type: Print (Hardcover)
- Pages: 88
- LC Class: HX811 1887 .D6
- Text: The Republic of the Future at Project Gutenberg

The Republic of the Future: or, Socialism a Reality is a novella by the American writer Anna Bowman Dodd, first published in 1887. The book is a dystopia written in response to the utopian literature that was a dramatic and noteworthy feature of the second half of the nineteenth century.

== Dystopias ==
The utopian literature of Dodd's generation consisted both of famous works and others now largely forgotten, like Laurence Gronlund's popular The Cooperative Commonwealth (1884). Dodd's book was one element in a conservative reaction to this literature. Other examples of this reactive dystopian response are William Harben's The Land of the Changing Sun (1894) and Charles J. Bayne's The Fall of Utopia (1900).

Coincidentally, Dodd's book was published a year before the appearance of Edward Bellamy's famous Looking Backward (1888), the great best-seller in its genre (which in turn provoked a spate of dystopian responses).

== Story and significance ==
Dodd casts her fiction in the form of an epistolary novel: Wolfgang, a Swedish aristocrat, writes letters home to his friend Hannevig while visiting New York Socialist City in the year 2050. In Dodd's fiction, Sweden retains a capitalist economy, so that Wolfgang can contrast the new utopian socialist regime in New York with the more familiar forms at home.

Dodd takes satirical aim at various liberal developments of her era, including the first stirrings of the animal rights movement (the ASPCA had been founded in New York in 1866). Dodd has her hero journey from Sweden to New York via a sub-oceanic transport system (operated by the Pneumatic Tube Electric Company). As he goes, Wolfgang notes that aquatic life has resisted

the persistent and unwearying exertions of the numerous Societies for the Prevention of Cruelty among Cetacea and Crustacea... of all the vertebrate or invertebrate animals, the fish is the least amenable to reformatory discipline.

Dodd's primary targets, however, are the innovations that utopians of her age most strongly advocated, socialism, feminism, and technological progress. Dodd paints a picture of a future New York as a dreary conformist society, in which the inhabitants live in identical homes and men and women dress alike. Though people work only two hours per day, they live tedious, vacuous lives. Travel is forbidden, and mediocrity is enforced by law: "All scholars, authors, artists and scientists who were found on examination to be more gifted than the average, were exiled." Children are raised in day care centers; romantic love has died out. Dodd's New Yorkers of 2050 "have the look of people who have come to the end of things and who have failed to find it amusing."

Since she is an anti-utopian writer, Dodd does not concentrate on the technological wonders anticipated and predicted by many utopian authors; but she does give her future New Yorkers automatic elevators and bedmaking devices and similar conveniences. Technology can make things worse instead of better: traditional food has been replaced by nutrition pills.

In Dodd's vision of the future, a socialist revolution occurred around 1900; the center of the city was destroyed with explosives, and rebuilt to socialist standards. Thinker and writer Henry George is enshrined in a Temple of Liberators.

== Author ==
Anna Bowman Dodd, née Blake (1855–1929), was a native of New York City, the daughter of a merchant. She wrote a number of other works in her career, including a biography of Tallyrand and books on travel.

== See also ==
- Arqtiq
- Caesar's Column
- Mizora
- New Amazonia
- The Scarlet Empire
- Unveiling a Parallel
