= Anna Bowman Dodd =

American writer (1858–1929)

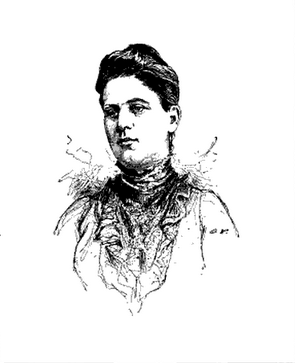
- Photo in The Illustrated American, 1891
- Born: Anna Bowman Blake; January 21, 1858; Brooklyn, New York, U.S.
- Died: January 1929 (aged 70–71); Paris
- Occupation: Author
- Spouse: Edward Williams Dodd
- Writing career
- Language: English
- Notable work: The Republic of the Future

Anna Bowman Dodd (née, Blake; January 21, 1858 - January 1929) was an American author from New York. Her first book was Cathedral Days (Boston, 1887), and her second The Republic of the Future (New York, 1887), was also successful. She published novels, such as Glorinda (Boston, 1888), as well as a book on Normandy, In and Out of Three Normandy Inns (New York, 1892). She wrote short stories, essays and a series of articles on church music. After Dodd wrote a paper on the Concord School of Philosophy for Appleton's Magazine, English journals copied it, a French translation was reprinted in Émile Littré's Revue Philosophique, and the author found her services in growing demand. She was engaged by Harper's Magazine in 1881 to furnish an exhaustive article on the political leaders of France, which she prepared for by going to France, in order to study the subject more closely. The paper's editor, Henry Mills Alden, pronounced it as 'the most brilliant article of the kind we have had in ten years'. Before returning to the U.S., she visited Rome and prepared a description of the carnival for Harper's.

== Early life and education ==
Anna Bowman Blake was born in Brooklyn, New York, January 21, 1858 (1855 is also recorded). Her father was Stephen M. Blake, a New York merchant. Dodd was of English ancestry, established in the U.S. long before the American Revolution. As a child, she traveled with her parents and studied abroad where she quickly learned to speak French and Italian fluently. The travel and study laid the foundation for the education she received after returning home to New York, where she also spent some time being introduced to society.

== Career ==
Dodd began her literary career providing articles for newspapers and magazines, chiefly the New York Evening Post, Appleton's, Harper's, and Lippincott's.

An early piece was a translation of one of Théophile Gautier's works, which was published in the New York Evening Post. The originality of the subject chosen, and the ability she demonstrated with the translation, commanded the editor's attention, and Dodd was subsequently assigned a commission to supply certain articles and editorials to the paper. Among the many she contributed was the first biographical sketch of George Eliot published in the U.S. Encouraged by the reception her articles received, Dodd wrote numerous short stories and essays for diverse publications, and published in the magazine edited by Josiah Gilbert Holland a number of papers on church music.

It was these that first brought her to the serious notice of Holland, who assigned her to visit and criticize, with humor, the then lately-established Concord School of Philosophy. Through her research, Dodd became seriously interested in the movement, and the result was an article so sympathetic to the philosophers and their mission, that it was promptly rejected by Holland, and as promptly accepted by a rival. She had written more wisely than she knew, and not only the English but the French reviews also copied the article. Harper's entrusted Dodd with a new task. They employed her to furnish them an exhaustive article on the political leaders of France. Carrying the necessary letters of introduction, she made her second visit to Paris, prepared to meet and study the political leaders of the new republic. Her fame as the author of the essay on the Concord School had preceded her. Men were prepared to meet a gray-haired, iron-faced doctress of philosophy; and were surprised by the young American they met instead. She turned in an excellent article, said to have been pronounced by Henry Mills Alden, the editor, as 'the most brilliant article of the kind we have had in ten years'.

Traveling to Rome with the sculptor, William Henry Rinehart, she gave Harper's a description of the famous carnival, elaborately illustrated by the artist. After her marriage to Edward Williams Dodd, of Boston, she became engaged in art criticism, and for two years she provided pieces for The Art Journal.

== Literary reception ==
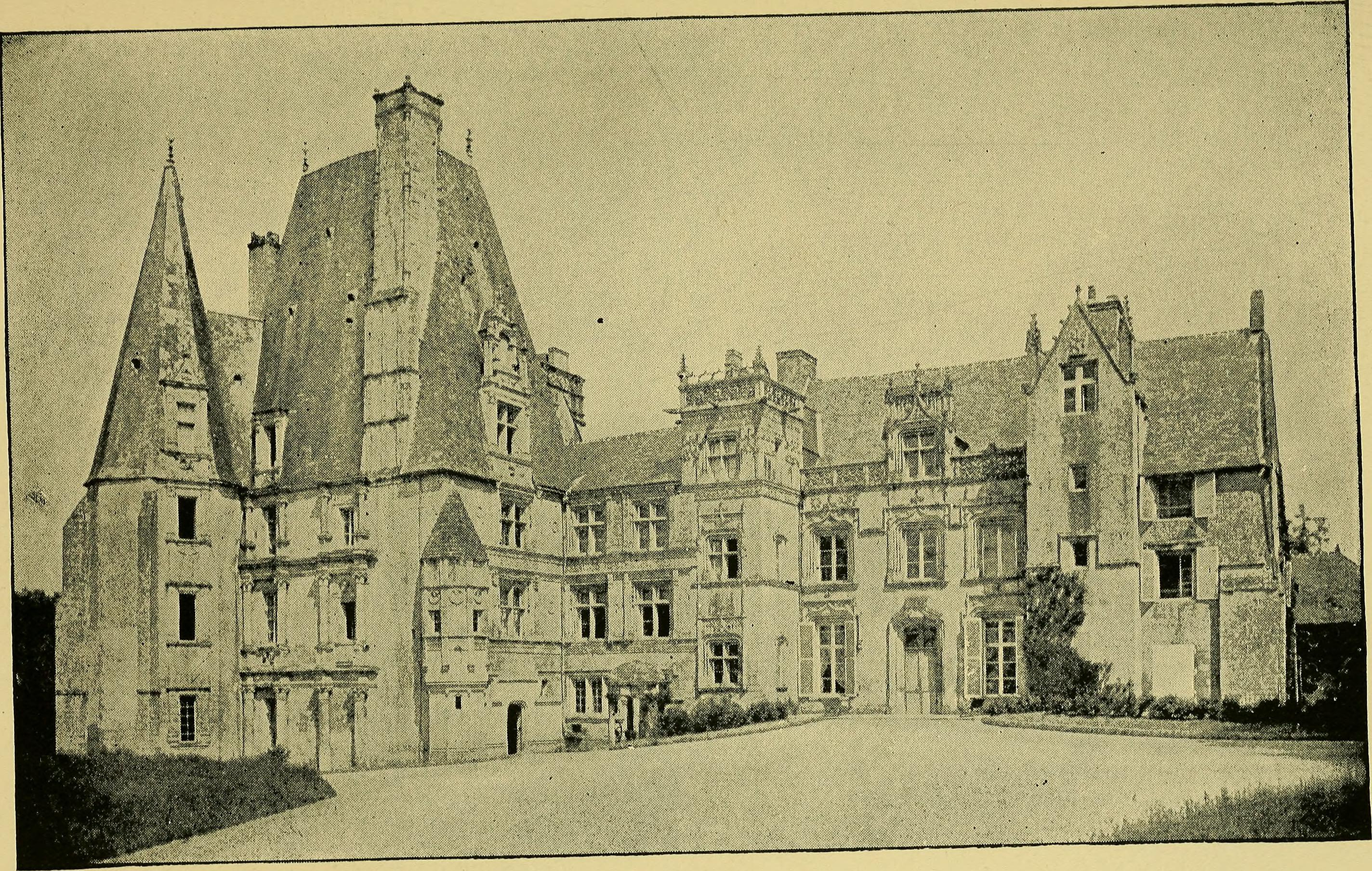
In and out of three Normandy inns (1910)

In and out of three Normandy inns is a historically accurate record of a tour along the Normandy coast, including a section which was comparatively unknown at the time. It is a narrative of the experiences and observations of Dodd and a friend during a summer spent in the towns and villages of Normandy. She was interested in everything, from the kitchens to the churches, from cooking to religion. The things that interested her the most were the people; and she succeeded in penetrating into their inner life and in portraying it with touches of humor and reflections. She made friends with many of them and identified herself with their concerns. As a picture of the country and its people, her book was considered entertaining. She offered an appreciation of the French character and temperament, and a broad, tolerant view of social and moral questions as features of her comments. The book included 46 illustrations by Charles Stanley Reinhart and other artists, on Japan paper.

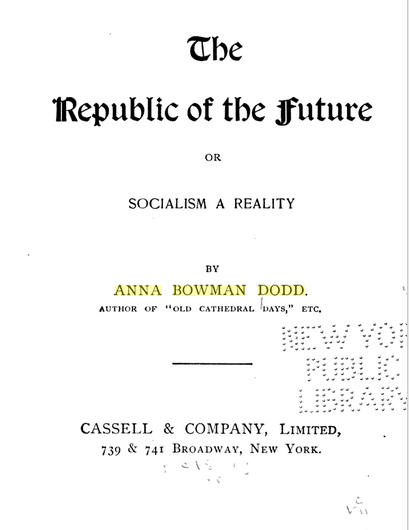
The Republic of the Future, Or, Socialism a Reality

Cathedral Days, a story of a season spent in the English cathedral towns, enjoyed success, as did the second book, The Republic of the Future (New York : Cassell & Co.). It was apparent that Edward Bellamy drew much of the inspiration for his utopian prophecy from The Republic. In The Republic, Dodd attempted the prophetic role, and presented a view of life at the middle of the 21st century, when the theories of Henry George would become completely realized. She wrote that death would save us from the problem of justice, liberty, equality, and fraternity. She described a nation of intellectual mediocrity where it was a crime to excel in anything, and where aristocracy and learning are detested and feared. The book's universe was based on a rigid equality, one house being precisely like every other house; where everyone's clothes were the same; where women were on the same footing as men; where there was no home life; where the children were reared in a government "kindergarten" without a parental love or care; where even food was prescribed by a state official, and in the shape of pellets sent whirling into the socialist's alimentary canal through a government "culinary duct"; where the people were pining away from mental and physical inactivity; where there was no God, no religion, no object in life worth living for, but there was a centralized government.

== Personal life ==
Dodd lived in New York. She died January 1929 in Paris.

== Selected works ==
- 1901, American husband in paris
- 1888, Cathedral days. a tour through southern england ... illustrated, etc
- 1885, Edmund C. Stedman in New York and at Kelp Rock
- 1900, Falaise : the town of the conqueror
- 1888, Glorinda : A Story
- 1915, Heroic France
- 1910, In and out of a French country-house
- 1892, In and out of three Normandy inns
- 1903, In the palaces of the sultan
- 19-?, The new woman in Turkey : how ancient rights and modern dress protect and improve the lot of Turkish women
- 1896, On the broads
- 1908, On the knees of the gods
- 1887, The Republic of the Future
- 1894, Struthers : and the comedy of the masked musicians
- 1927, Talleyrand : the training of a statesman, 1754-1838
- 1920, Up the seine to the battlefields

== Gallery ==
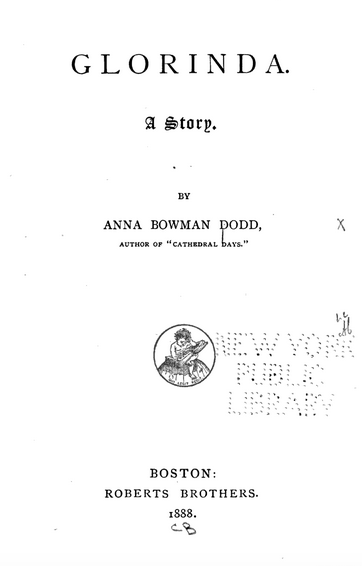
"Glorinda: A Story"

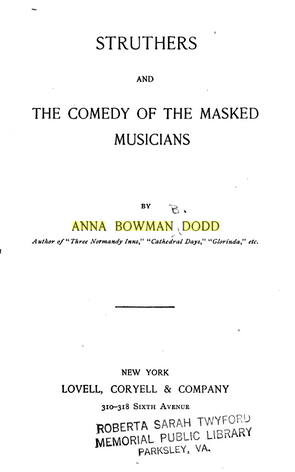
"Struthers: And The Comedy of the Masked Musicians"

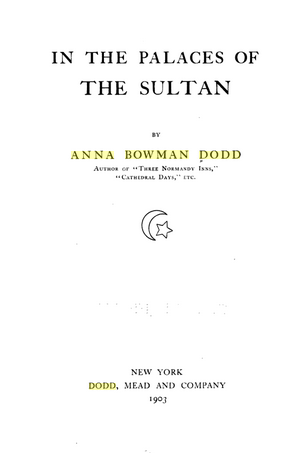
"In the Palaces of the Sultan"

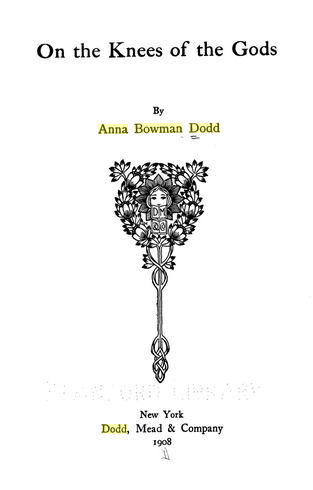
"On the Knees of the Gods"
